= German bombing of Britain, 1914–1918 =

World War I air campaign

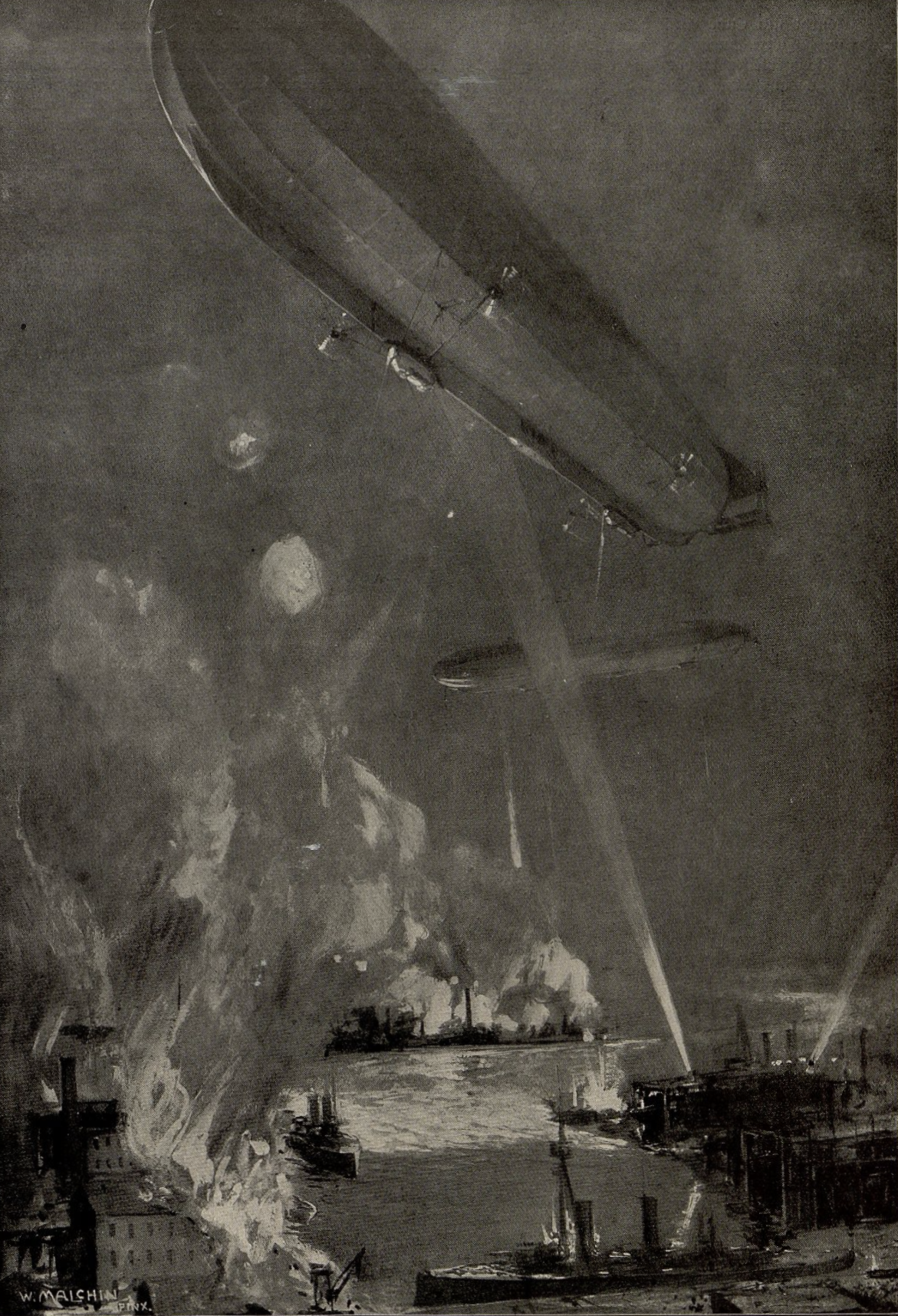
German airships attack Elswick, Newcastle-upon-Tyne, June 1915 (illustration by W. Malchin)

The German Empire conducted a strategic bombing campaign against the United Kingdom throughout the First World War. After some initial attacks by seaplanes, the main campaign began in January 1915 with airships. Until the Armistice of 11 November 1918, the Marine-Fliegerabteilung (Navy Aviation Department) and Die Fliegertruppen des deutschen Kaiserreiches (Imperial German Flying Corps) mounted over fifty bombing raids. The raids were generally referred to in Britain as Zeppelin raids but Schütte-Lanz airships were also used. In the autumn of 1916 the Flying Corps abandoned airship raids in favour of bomber aircraft, although the Navy persisted with airships until the end of the war. Although London was the main focus for the raids, many other towns were hit, either as secondary targets or as the result of navigation errors. In all, more than 1,400 people were killed in the raids with almost 3,500 people injured and causing damage amounting to nearly £3 million, for the loss of thirty airships and sixty-two large aeroplanes.

== Technology of the German Zeppelin ==
The zeppelin was first created in the early 20th century, Germany was one of the main countries developing airships. Count Ferdinand von Zeppelin built his first airship, the LZ1, in July 1900. The first airships where actually made of aluminum frames, but in 1914 Zeppelin switched to the material Duralumin. It was lighter than aluminum, but still strong which made it a better material when building airships. Zeppelin later hired Ludwig Durr as his chief engineer in which he designed the supports for future Zeppelin airships.

== 1914 ==
=== Early German long-range bombing ===
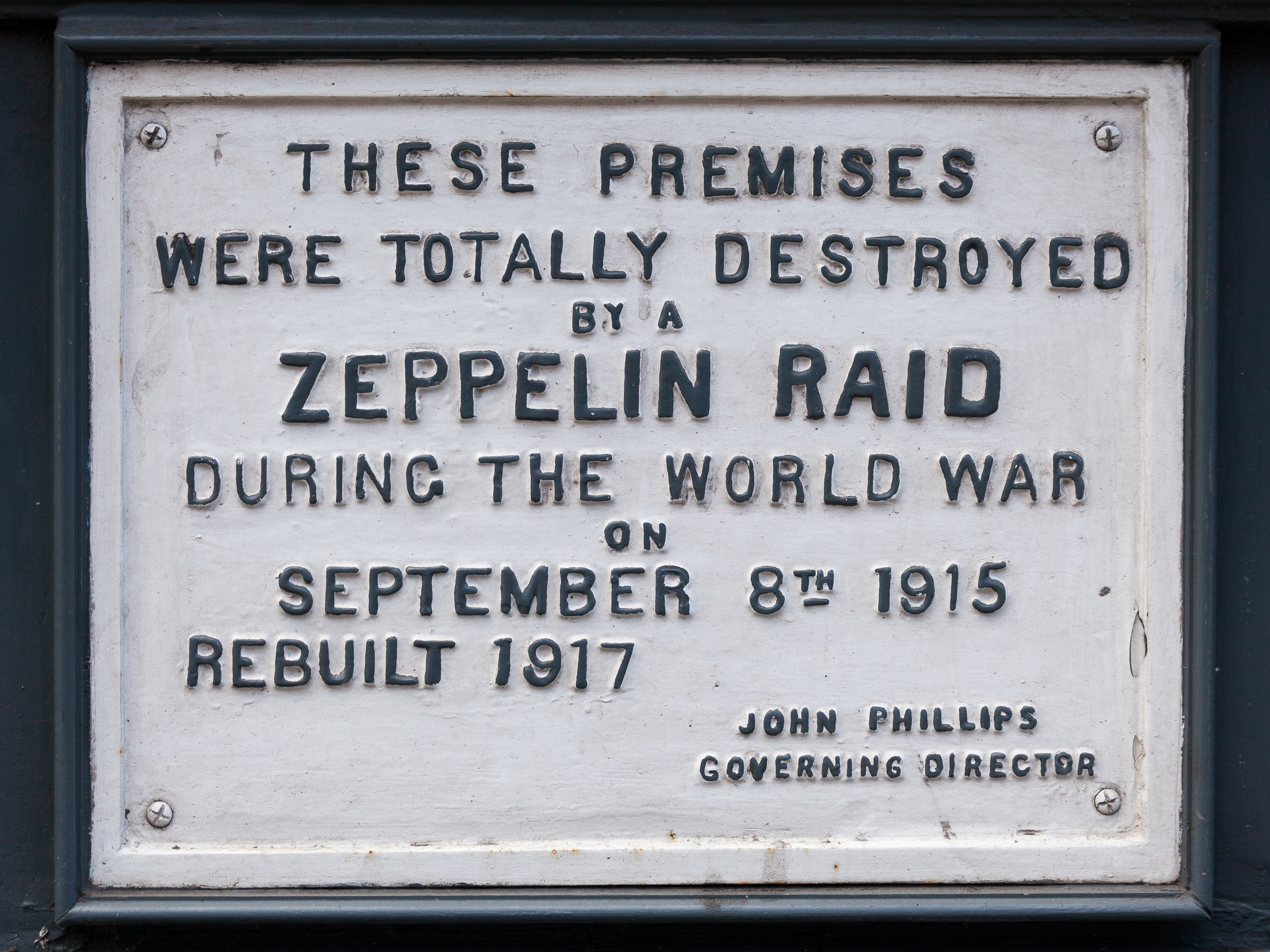
A plaque (61 Farringdon Road, London) commemorating a First World War Zeppelin raid on London

On 6 August 1914, the German Army Zeppelin Z VI bombed the Belgian city of Liège, killing nine civilians. Ten more died in a night attack on Antwerp on 25 August and 2 September. In the first month of the war, Germany formed the Brieftauben Abteilung Ostende ("Ostend Carrier Pigeon Detachment"), a cover name for an elite air unit, commanded by Major Wilhelm Siegert, to be used for the bombing of the Channel Ports, when new long-range aircraft became available. During the opening months of the war, a German pilot flying a Taube regularly dropped bombs on Paris. The first raid consisted of five small bombs and a note demanding the immediate surrender of Paris and the French nation. Before the stabilisation of the Western Front, German aircraft made a number of raids on Paris, slightly damaging Notre Dame Cathedral. The first bombing raids on England were nuisance raids carried out against Channel ports. By mid October 1914 Londoners were already fearing a Zeppelin raid and all lights were hidden at night. German press reports mention a raid carried out on 27 October but there is no British record of an incident on this date.

=== First attack on Britain ===
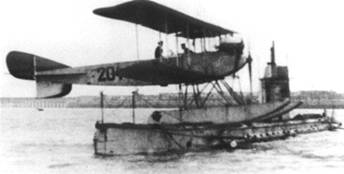
Example of a FF29 floatplane, seen atop the German submarine U-12

The first raid that was undoubtedly made on Britain was on 21 December; the weather was dull with a slight wind from the south and rain showers. At 1:00 p.m. the Friedrichshafen FF.29 seaplane no. 203 from I. Seeflieger-Abteilung, carrying four 4.4 lb (2 kg) bombs, flown by Flugzeugführer Leutnant Stephan von Proudzynski and his observer (Beobachter) Fähnrich zur See Ludwig von Frankenberg und Proschlitz, dropped two bombs into the sea near the Admiralty Pier in Dover. On 24 December the weather was cloudy, slightly misty with a north-easterly breeze. Proudzynski and Fankenberg in FF.29 no. 204, appeared high over Dover. Tommy Terson looked up from his garden in Leyburne Road as he was picking Brussels sprouts for his Christmas dinner and an object in the sky rushed past, his garden exploded and knocked him down, causing him superficial injuries. As he got up he saw a crater 10 by 4 ft (3.0 by 1.2 m) where his sprouts had been. The windows of the houses near the explosion had been broken and a neighbour, James Banks, up a ladder collecting holly, had been thrown to the ground. The aircraft dropped a bomb near Dover Castle, which broke some glass. A British pilot took off but failed to find the aircraft.

Christmas Day was fine with a light breeze from the south-south-west. At 12:35 p.m. Proudzynski and Fankenberg reappeared in FF.29 no. 203 over Sheerness at 7,000 ft (2,100 m) and were fired on by anti-aircraft guns as they flew up the Thames, pursued by three aircraft that had taken off from bases at Eastchurch and the Isle of Grain. A Vickers F.B.4 (Gunbus no. 664) of 7 Squadron Royal Flying Corps (RFC), flown by Second-Lieutenant Montagu Chidson and the gunner, Corporal Martin, overtook the raider near Erith and attacked over Purfleet. Both aircraft were engaged with 22 rounds by anti-aircraft guns and took evasive action. The Vickers machine gun carried by the F.B.4 jammed and Martin resorted to a carbine, loaded with nine rounds of incendiary ammunition, reserved for attacks on airships. Martin hit the FF.29 three times around the cockpits. The German pilot dived away; the British aircraft suffered an engine failure and glided down to land at Eastchurch. On the return journey the German pilot dropped two bombs harmlessly at Cliffe station and flew out to sea.

The British press began to use the term "baby killers" after the raid on Scarborough, Hartlepool and Whitby in December 1914, a naval bombardment, but it was later used in connection with airship raids as civilian deaths increased. The government used this phrase to their advantage to encourage young men to enlist, before the draft became mandatory.

== 1915 ==
=== German plans ===
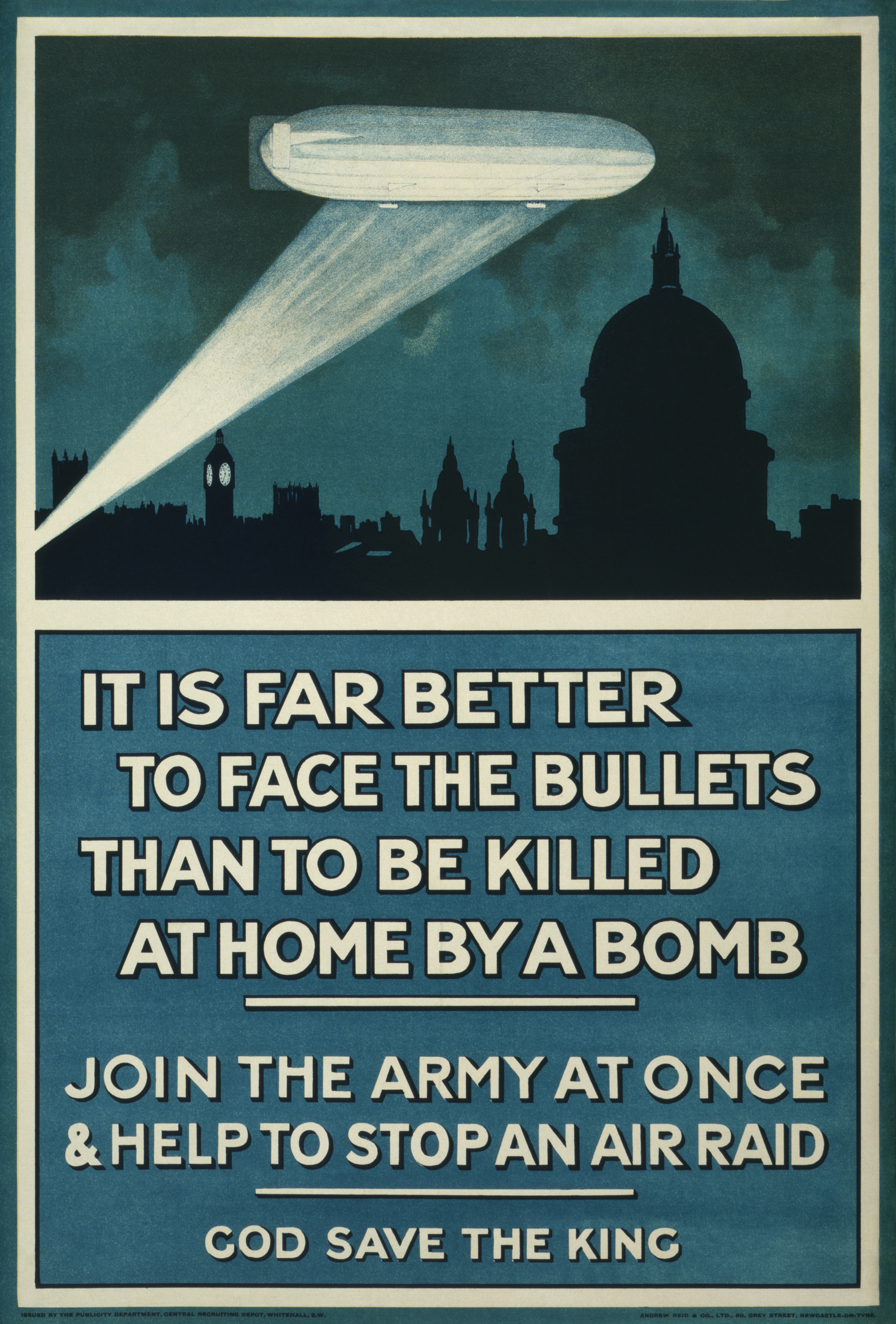
British recruiting poster from 1915

Proposals to bomb Britain were first made by Paul Behncke, deputy chief of the German Naval Staff, in August 1914. The proposals were backed by Alfred von Tirpitz, who wrote that,

The measure of the success will lie not only in the injury which will be caused to the enemy but also in the significant effect it will have in diminishing the enemy's determination to prosecute the war.

=== New year raids ===
The campaign was approved by the Kaiser on 7 January 1915, who at first forbade attacks on London, fearing that his relatives in the British royal family might be injured. Following a failed attempt on 13 January 1915, which was abandoned because of the weather, the first successful attempt took place on the night of 19/20 January 1915. Two Zeppelins were to attack targets near the Humber estuary but were diverted south by strong winds and dropped their bombs on Great Yarmouth, Sheringham, King's Lynn and the surrounding Norfolk villages. Two British aircraft took off but failed to find the airships; four people were killed and 16 injured. Monetary damage was estimated at £7,740 (equivalent to £860,700 in 2024).

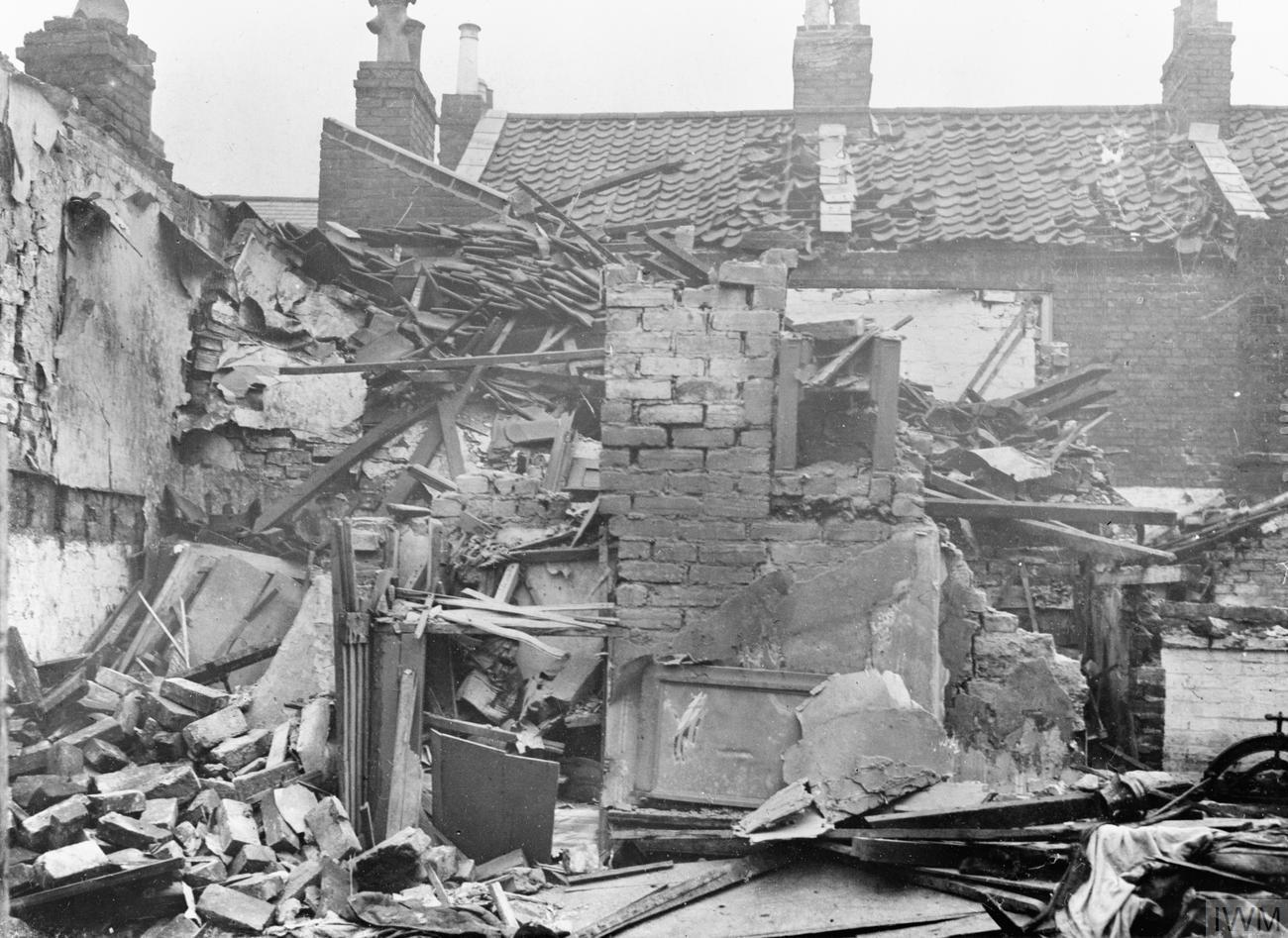
Destroyed property in King's Lynn, Norfolk, following the raid on 19 January 1915

The raid prompted alarmist stories about German agents using car headlights to guide Zeppelins to their targets. The first Navy attempts to bomb London, made by L8, failed due to poor weather. (Note: Zeppelin production numbers were in a sequence from LZ1 to LZ112 for airships built during the war. The Navy used the prefix L for their Zeppelins and the Army Z, later amended to LZ and not always consistent with the production number used by the Zeppelin firm. Schütte-Lanz airships were always SL, from SL1 to SL22.) The first attempt was made on 26 February but was abortive due to headwinds. A second attempt ended when the airship flew below the cloud base to check its position and found itself over Belgian army positions near Ostend. The Zeppelin was riddled by small-arms fire and landed near Tienen, where it was destroyed by high winds. A four-airship raid by the Army on 17 March ran into fog and was abandoned, one airship bombing Calais and being damaged on landing. On 20 March the three remaining Army airships set off to bomb Paris and one was lost on the return journey. Two Navy raids failed due to bad weather on 14 and 15 April, and it was decided to delay further attempts until the more capable P-class Zeppelins were in service.

The Army received the first P-class Zeppelin, LZ38 (Hauptmann Erich Linnarz), that raided Ipswich on 29/30 April and Southend on 9/10 May. An Imperial Order dated 12 February authorised the bombing of the London docks, which was interpreted by the German General Staff as permission to bomb targets east of Charing Cross. This interpretation was formally accepted by the Kaiser on 5 May 1915. LZ 38 also attacked Dover and Ramsgate on 16/17 May, where, over Dover at 2:25 a.m., it was illuminated by searchlights, the first such event in the war. Anti-aircraft fire induced Linnarz to dump his bombs on Oxney, to no effect. Flight Sub-Lieutenant Redford Mulock, a Canadian member of the Royal Naval Air Service (RNAS), flew an Avro carrying two incendiary bombs and two hand-grenades from Westgate-on-Sea and caught up with LZ 38 as it bombed. Linnarz ordered the Zeppelin to climb rapidly before Mulock could attack and turned north, floating above the Goodwin Sands, where engine-trouble forced him to turn for home. Mulock followed the Zeppelin, climbing steadily to 7,000 ft (2,100 m), as far as the West-Hinder lightship but could not catch up.

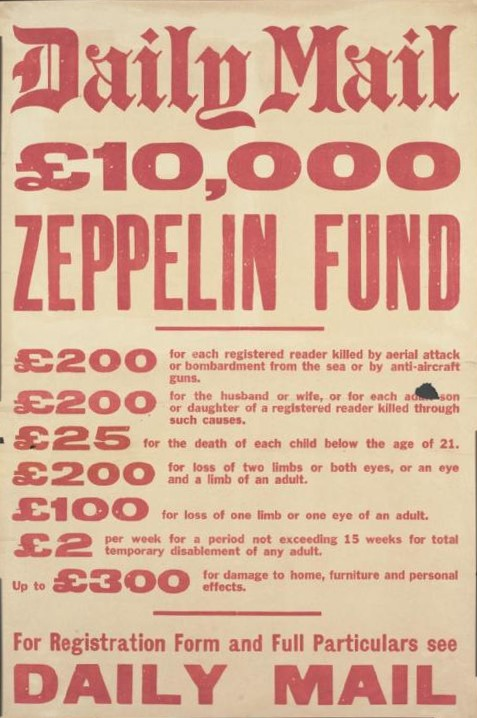
Advertisement by the Daily Mail for its Zeppelin fund

LZ38 attacked Southend again on 26/27 May, dropping seventy bombs, killing three people and wounding three, with no damage to buildings. Five aircraft rose to intercept and failed to find the airship, two being damaged on landing. These four raids killed six people and injured six, causing property damage estimated at £16,898. RNAS aircraft had twice tried to intercept LZ 38 but it out-climbed the aircraft or was already at too great an altitude for the aircraft to intercept; the B.E.2 had a rate of climb of about 500 ft/min (150 m/min).

On the night of 30/31 May, Linnarz commanded LZ38 on the first London raid; LZ37 was also to be part of the raid but was damaged early on and returned to Namur. Flying from Evere LZ38 crossed the English coast near Margate at 9:42 p.m. before turning west over Southend. London police were warned of a raid around 11:00 p.m.; a few minutes later small incendiaries began to fall. These devices, weighing 25 lb (11 kg), were filled with thermite and the exterior was wrapped in tarred rope. About 120 bombs were dropped on a line from Stoke Newington south to Stepney and then north toward Leytonstone. Seven people were killed and 35 injured; 41 fires were started, burning out seven properties and the damage was assessed at £18,596.

Aware of the difficulties that the Germans were experiencing in navigation, the government issued a D notice prohibiting the press from reporting anything about attacks not mentioned in official statements. Earlier press reports had contained detailed information about where bombs had fallen. Fifteen sorties were flown against the raiders, only one of which managed to make visual contact with an airship. No ground-based guns fired and no searchlights found the airship; one British pilot was killed on landing.

The naval airships also tried to raid London; on 4 June strong winds led the commander of L10 to misjudge his position and bomb Gravesend. L9 was also blown off course by the weather on the night of 6/7 June, attacking Hull instead of London and causing considerable damage. On the same night a raid by three Army Zeppelins also failed because of the weather; as the airships returned to Evere they ran into RNAS aircraft flying from Veurne in Belgium. LZ38 was destroyed on the ground and LZ37 was intercepted in the air by Reginald Warneford in a Morane Parasol, who dropped six 9 kg (20 lb) Hales bombs on the Zeppelin, setting it on fire. LZ37 crashed into the convent school of Sint-Amandsberg; two nuns and all but one of the Zeppelin's crew died. Warneford was awarded the Victoria Cross for his achievement and Zeppelins were withdrawn from their bases in Belgium.

The Home Counties (1889–1965) 1 Buckinghamshire, 2 Hertfordshire, 3 Essex, 4. Berkshire, 5 Middlesex (now part of Greater London), 6 Surrey, 7 Kent and 8 Sussex; County of London shown in yellow

After an ineffective attack by L10 on Tyneside on 15/16 June the short summer nights discouraged further raids for some months and the remaining Army Zeppelins were reassigned to the Eastern and Balkan fronts. The Navy resumed raids on Britain in August. On 9/10 August, four Zeppelins were directed against London; none reached its target and L12 was damaged by ground fire near Dover and came down in the sea off Zeebrugge. Despite eight attacks by RNAS aircraft, the airship was towed into Ostend where it was dismantled. The four-Zeppelin raid was repeated on 12/13 August; again only one airship, L10, made landfall, dropping its bombs on Harwich.

A third four-Zeppelin raid tried to reach London on 17/18 August but two turned back with mechanical problems, one bombed Ashford, Kent in the belief it was Woolwich and L10 became the first Navy airship to reach London. L10 was beset by navigational errors, mistaking the reservoirs of the Lea Valley for the Thames and bombing Walthamstow and Leytonstone. Ten people were killed, 48 injured and property damage was estimated at £30,750. Anti-aircraft guns were fired at L10 and a few aircraft took off in pursuit but the Zeppelin suffered no damage. L10 was destroyed a little over two weeks later when it was struck by lightning, caught fire off Cuxhaven and was lost with all hands.

Two Army Zeppelins bombed London on 7/8 September, SL2 dropped bombs on the Isle of Dogs, Deptford, Greenwich and Woolwich, and LZ74 was forced to drop weight on its approach and scattered 39 bombs over Cheshunt, before heading on to London and dropping bombs on Bermondsey, Rotherhithe and New Cross. Eighteen people were killed and 28 injured; property damage totalled £9,616. Fog and mist prevented British aircraft taking off but anti-aircraft guns fired at LZ74 with no effect. Although these raids had no significant military impact, the psychological effect was considerable. The Navy attempted to follow up the Army's success the following night. Three Zeppelins were directed against London and L9 (Kapitänleutnant Loew) against the benzol plant at the Skinningrove ironworks. L9 arrived at the coast at Port Mulgrave, between Whitby and Kettleness at about 9:15 p.m. and dropped six bombs with no result. The Zeppelin reached the ironworks at 9:35 p.m. and dropped nine HE and 12 incendiary bombs, achieving a hit with an incendiary on the benzol building, which failed to penetrate inside. A HE bomb fell within 10 ft (3.0 m) and cut the water and electricity supply but the 45,000 imp gal (200,000 L; 54,000 US gal) was not affected. Another bomb hit a store of TNT but failed to explode. L9 crossed the coast on its homeward journey at Sandsend at 9:45 p.m. three RNAS pilots from Redcar had taken off but failed to make contact.

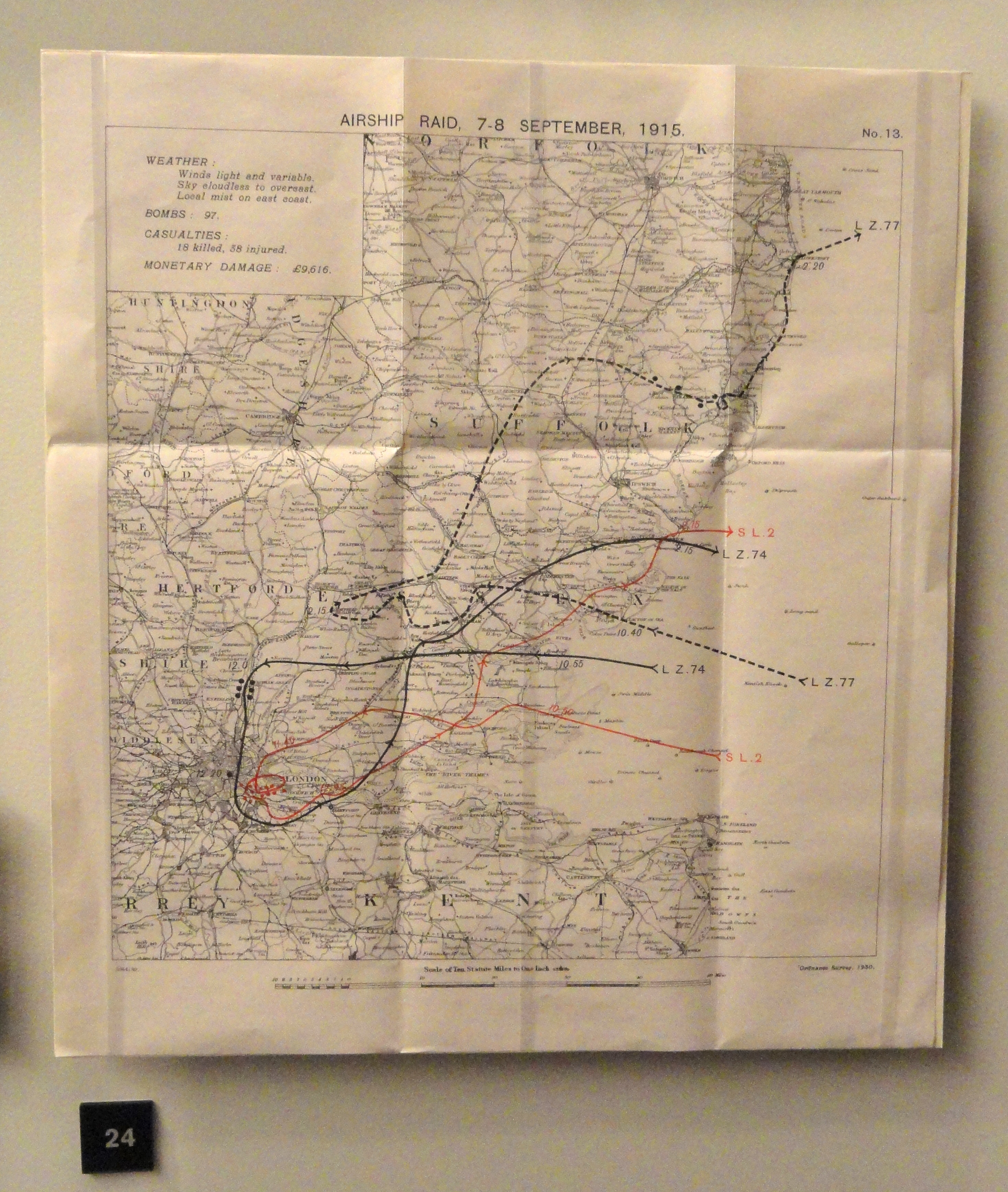
British map plotting the raid of 7/8 September

L11 had turned back early with engine trouble; L13 (Kapitänleutnant Heinrich Mathy) and L14 (Kapitänleutnant der Reserve Böcker) flew across the North Sea together. Two armed trawlers were waiting off the Haisboro' light vessel and caught L14 at low altitude. One of the trawlers fired eight rounds from its QF 1-pounder 'pom-pom' which led Böcker into a steep climb, under the impression that he had been engaged by light cruisers and turned north. Soon afterwards, L13 also encountered a trawler, which opened fire. L14 reached England at Cromer then suffered engine-trouble, apparently bombing Norwich but hitting Bylaugh, East Dereham and Scarning; four men were killed at East Dereham and seven people were injured for no material damage. L13 made landfall at The Wash and flew straight to London in clear skies, bombing Golders Green at 10:40 p.m. At Euston, L13 began to bomb again; the bomb-load included a 660 lb (300 kg) device, the largest yet carried; which exploded on Bartholomew Close near Smithfield Market, destroying several houses and killing two men.

More bombs fell on the textile warehouses north of St Paul's Cathedral, causing a fire which, despite the attendance of 22 fire engines, caused over half a million pounds damage. Mathy then turned east, dropping his remaining bombs on Liverpool Street station, fifteen HE and 55 incendiaries being dropped. The Zeppelin, at 9,000 ft (2,700 m), was repeatedly caught by searchlights and all 26 anti-aircraft guns in London opened fire, inducing Mathy to zig-zag and ascend to 11,000 ft (3,400 m). Every shell exploded too low and the falling shell splinters caused alarm and damage on the ground. Three RNAS pilots took off from Yarmouth but had already landed by the time that L13 headed out to sea. Flight Sub-Lieutenant G. W. Hilliard landed at Bacton and was killed when the bombs on board exploded; Flight Lieutenant J. M. R. Cripps came down with engine-failure and jumped clear of his aircraft just before it touched down, suffering no injuries; the aeroplane being hardly damaged. The raid killed 22 people and injured 87; the monetary damage of £534,287 was over one sixth of the total damage inflicted by bombing raids during the war. (Note: The army airship LZ77 was heard between 8:40 and 10:40 p.m. off Dunwich and off Dover, bombs exploding near the Galloper Lightship being thought to have been dropped by it.)

==== Theatreland Raid ====
After three more raids were scattered by the weather a five-Zeppelin raid which became known as the Theatreland Raid was launched by the Navy on 13 October. Arriving over the Norfolk coast around 6:30 p.m., the Zeppelins encountered nearer London the new London Air Defence Area defences installed since the September raid by Admiral Sir Percy Scott, which included new 3-inch guns at Barnes Common, King's Cross and Dollis Hill. The new gun sites proved ineffective, although the airship commanders commented on the improved defences of the city. A 13-pounder gun near Broxbourne was put out of action by three bombs dropped from L15, which continued to London and began bombing over Charing Cross, the first bombs striking the Lyceum Theatre and the corner of Exeter and Wellington Streets, killing 17 people and injuring 20. More bombs were dropped on Holborn, as the airship neared Moorgate it was engaged by a new French 75 mm anti-gun mounted on a lorry and manned by naval ratings from disbanded armoured car squadrons sited at the Honourable Artillery Company grounds in Finsbury.

L15 quickly jettisoned ballast, dropped only three more bombs (one landing on Aldgate High Street, causing much damage) before departing, having suffered engine damage from the shells. L13 bombed around Guildford and near Woolwich later on. L14 dropped bombs on Otterpool Army Camp near Folkestone, killing 14 soldiers, injuring 12 and later bombed Tonbridge and East Croydon. L16 and L11 had gone even further off course; L16 dropped up to 50 bombs on Hertford and L11 scattered a few bombs over Norfolk before heading home. In total, 71 people were killed and 128 were injured. This was the last raid of 1915, as bad weather coincided with the new moon in November and December 1915 and continued into January 1916.

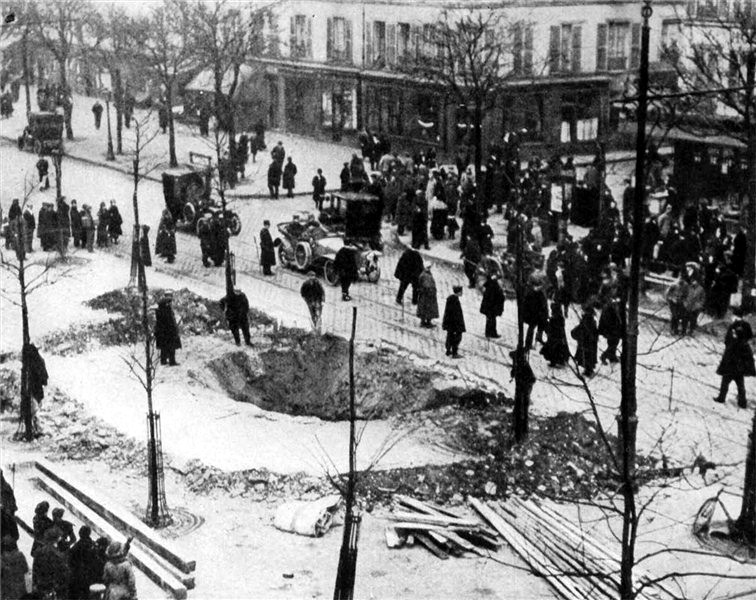
Crater of a Zeppelin bomb in Paris

In December 1915, more P-class Zeppelins and the first of the new Q-class airships were delivered. The Q-class was larger than the P-class, lengthened to 585 ft (178 m), adding two gasbags, improving the ceiling and bomb-load. Better defensive measures of the British made raids more hazardous and several airships were destroyed. By mid-1916, there were 271 anti-aircraft guns and 258 searchlights in England. New types of Zeppelin with improved ceilings restored the German technical advantage but led to further flying and navigation problems; oxygen was needed to fly at high altitude, the extreme cold led to crew fatigue and more faults. German meteorologists did not appreciate the differing wind conditions likely to be met at high altitude. Defence against Zeppelins was haphazard and divided between the RNAS and the RFC, the Navy engaging enemy airships approaching the coast and the RFC responsible once the Zeppelins were over land. The War Office believed that the Zeppelins used a layer of inert gas to protect themselves from incendiary bullets and discouraged the use of such ammunition in favour of bombs. Trials of incendiary bullets in mid-1915 at Gosport and Upavon were unimpressive and the explosive Pomeroy bullet attracted little official interest. Experiments undertaken in 1916 by the RFC at the School of Musketry, Hythe using a mixture of explosive and incendiary rounds were promising and 500,000 Pomeroy bullets were ordered; a mixture of Pomeroy, Brock and Buckingham bullets brought the defending aircraft their first victories.

== 1916 ==
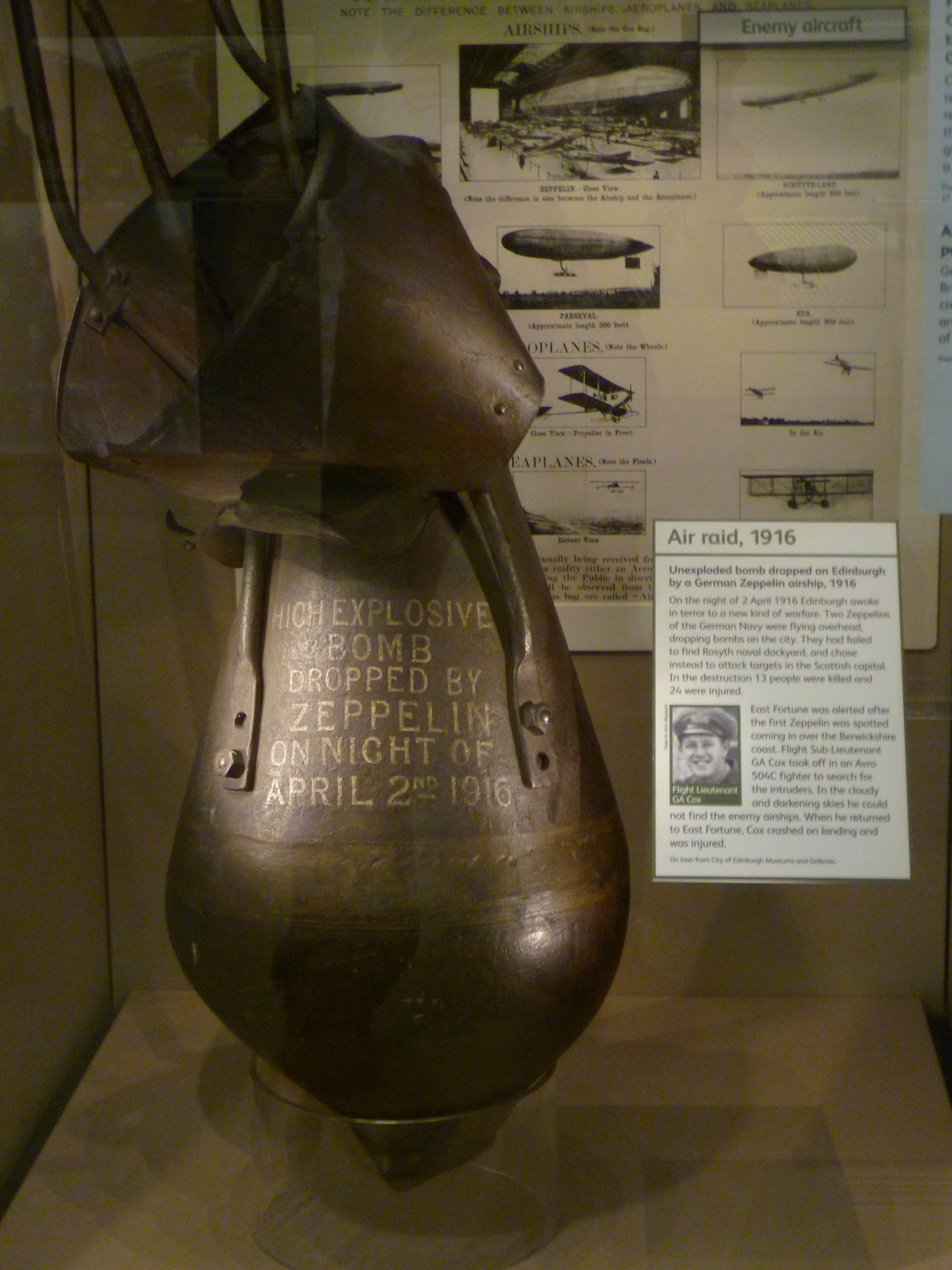
Zeppelin bomb dropped on Edinburgh, displayed at the National Museum of Flight

The first raid of 1916 was carried out by the German Navy. Nine Zeppelins were sent to Liverpool on the night of 31 January/1 February. Poor weather, difficulty in navigating and mechanical problems scattered the aircraft across the Black Country, bombing Tipton, Wednesbury and Walsall; 61 people were reported killed and 101 injured. Fifteen of the fatalities occurred in the town of Tipton. L21 (Kapitänleutnant der Reserve Max Dietrich), caused the majority of the damage. Despite the ground fog, 22 aircraft took off to find the Zeppelins but none succeeded. Six aircraft were damaged beyond repair and two pilots were killed in landing accidents.

L19 (Kapitänleutnant Odo Loewe) was last seen low off the West Frisian Islands and fired on with small-arms by Dutch troops. No airships could take off due to high winds, several aircraft from Borkum found nothing and two failed to return. At dusk on 1 February a Zeppelin, apparently in difficulties, was reported off Cromer. Harwich Force sent several light cruisers and destroyers but found nothing. Captain Martin, of the Grimsby trawler King Stephen, returned to port on 3 February and reported that at 7:00 a.m. on 2 February he had seen L19 on the water, sinking, about 120 mi (190 km) east of the Spurn lightship. Loewe appealed for rescue but the trawler skipper refused, despite offers of money, fearful of his crew of eight being overpowered by the Germans; a search was conducted but nothing was found. (Note: Several months afterwards, a bottle washed up near Marstrand in Norway with a final report by Loewe. The report described L19 on the water at longitude 3° east. Three engines had broken down and headwinds slowed the return journey. Off the Netherlands rifle-fire had been encountered and three engines failed at the same time. "Now, about one o'clock in the afternoon, our last hour is approaching. Loewe.")

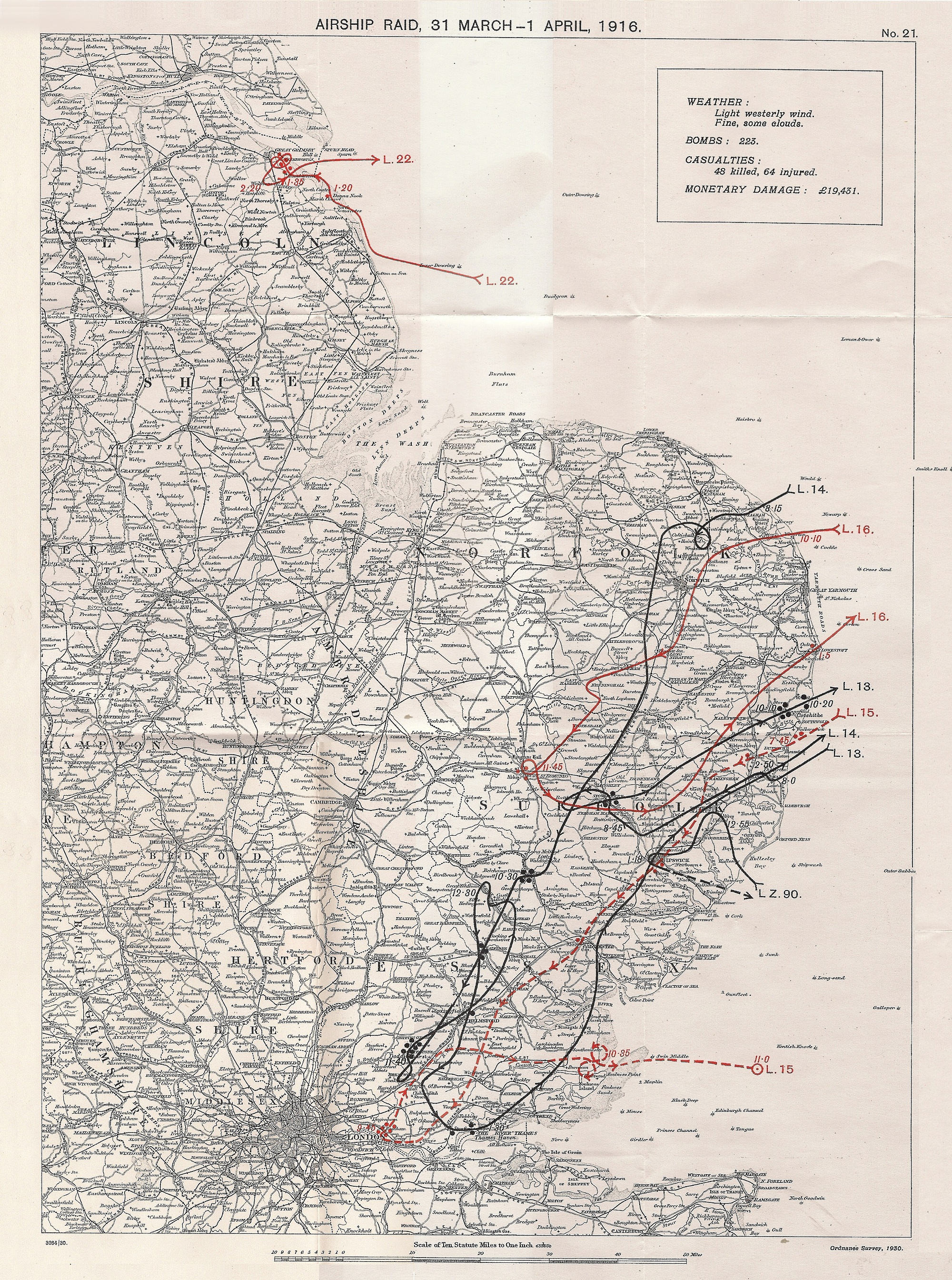
Ordnance Survey map of Airship raid 31 March/1 April 1916 on England

Ten home defence squadrons were organised by February 1916, with the defence of London assigned to 19 Squadron at Sutton's Farm and Hainault Farm (renamed 39 (Home Defence) Squadron in April 1916, which was also allocated North Weald Bassett airfield in August 1916). The number of aircraft varied and in February there were only eight squadrons at less than half-strength; by June the number of squadrons had been cut to six and only 39 Squadron was at full strength and equipped with the B.E.2c aircraft, outclassed on the Western Front but providing a stable gun platform suitable for night fighting. Raids were postponed due to a spell of poor weather and by the withdrawal of the majority of Navy Zeppelins to resolve their chronic mechanical unreliability. Three Zeppelins set off to bomb Rosyth on 5/6 March but were forced by high winds to divert to Hull, killing 18 people, injuring 52 and causing £25,005 damage.

On 19 March, a Gotha UWD 120 and 4 Friedrichshafen FF.33 seaplanes took off from Zeebrugge at 12:00 p.m. and bombed Dover, hitting Langton Fort, Dover Castle, Shoulder of Mutton battery and "a large number of sheds and barracks" with thirty-two 11 lb (5 kg) bombs at 2:40 p.m. After finishing its bombing run, the UWD turned and made an S-course for Zeebrugge, being the first aircraft to reach Dover and return at 4:30 p.m. A Caudron G.4 and several Sopwith Baby aircraft tried to intercept the remaining FF.33s but failed.

On the night of 30 March/1 April seven Navy and three Army Zeppelins set off to bomb eastern England and London; most turned back with mechanical trouble or because of the weather. L15 was intercepted by Claude Ridley, who was unable to do more than fire a few rounds at extreme range; the Zeppelin was damaged by anti-aircraft fire over Purfleet before being attacked by Alfred Brandon using Ranken darts. It came down in the sea near Margate, all but one of the crew surviving. Most of the 48 people killed in the raid were victims of a bomb which fell on an Army billet in Cleethorpes. The following night two Navy Zeppelins, diverted from London by the weather, bombed targets in the north of England, killing 22 people and injuring 130.

On the night of 2/3 April, a six-airship raid was made by Army and Navy airships, the naval ships against the naval base at Rosyth and the Forth Bridge on the east coast of Scotland, the Army Zeppelins attacking London. None of the airships bombed their intended targets; 13 people were killed, 24 injured and much of the £77,113 damage was caused by the destruction of a warehouse in Leith full of whisky. A two-Zeppelin raid the following night failed to bomb London in inclement weather and caused no casualties or damage; another against the north of England on the night of 5/6 April had little effect. One of the three raiders turned back with mechanical problems; the ironworks at Skinningrove and a colliery near Bishop Auckland were bombed with casualties of one dead and nine injured.

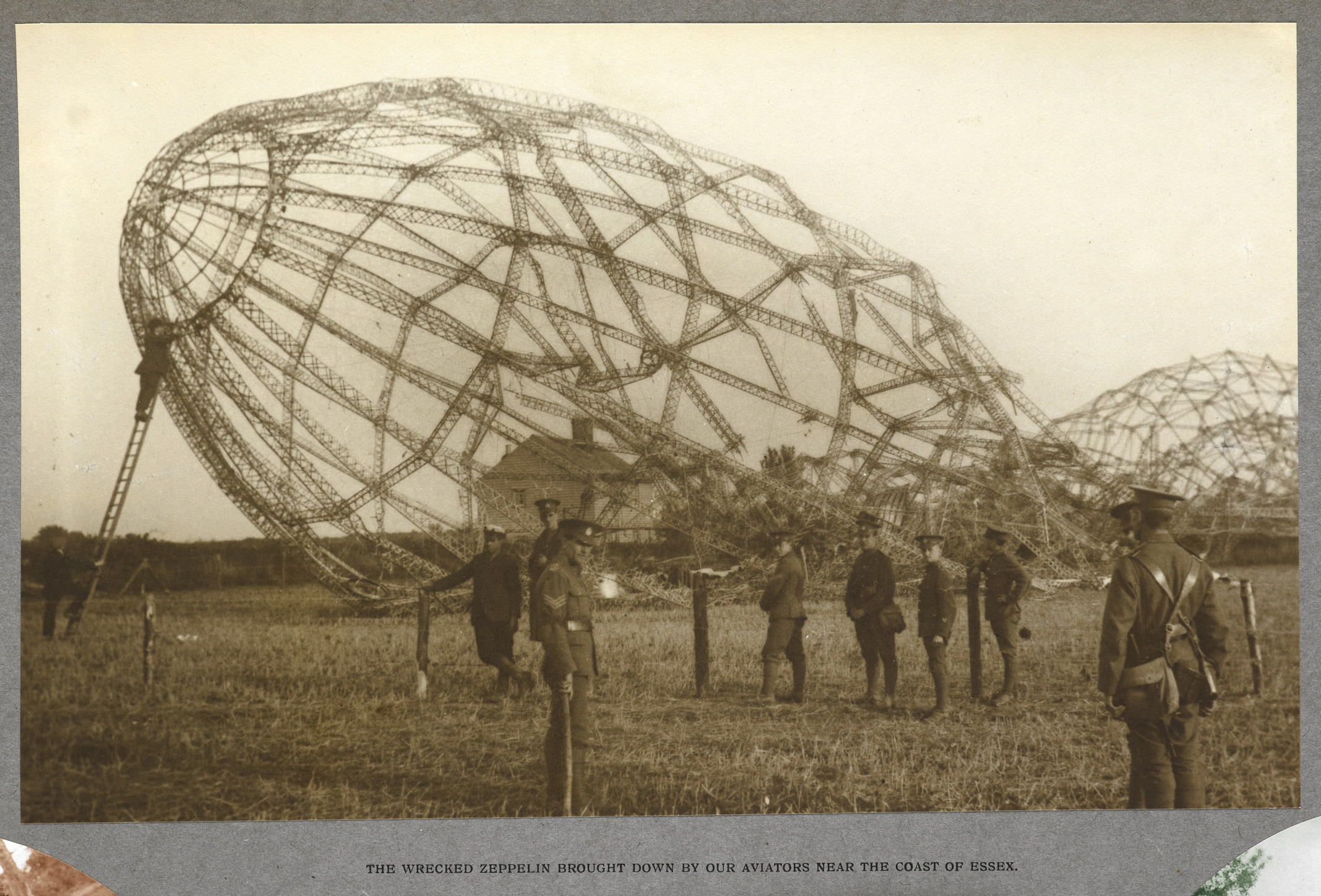
The wreckage of LZ76 (L 33)

On 28/29 July the first raid to include L31, one of the new R-class Zeppelins, took place. These were 660 ft (200 m) long, with a capacity of 2,000,000 cu ft (55,000 m^{3}), powered by six engines, capable of operating at 13,000 ft (4,000 m) and could carry up to 4 long tons (4.1 t) of bombs. The ten Zeppelins achieved very little; four turned back early and the rest wandered over a fog-shrouded landscape before giving up. Adverse weather dispersed raids on 30/31 July and 2/3 August. On 8/9 August, two Zeppelins were part of a nine-airship raid on Hull. The sixth successful London raid was on 24/25 August, when 13 Navy Zeppelins set out and L31 reached London; flying above low clouds, 36 bombs were dropped in ten minutes on West Ferry Road, Deptford Dry Dock, the station at Norway Street and homes in Greenwich, Eltham and Plumstead. Nine people were killed, 40 injured and £130,203 of damage was caused. L31 suffered no damage in the attack but several weeks of repair work were needed following a hard landing.

On 2/3 September, twelve Navy airships and four from the Army attacked England. Rain and snowstorms scattered the airships while they were over the North Sea. None of the Navy airships reached London and only the Army ship LZ98 and the new SL11 achieved their objective. SL11 came in over Foulness to attack the capital from the north-west. It dropped a few bombs over London Colney and South Mimms before it was picked up by a searchlight over Hornsey at about 1:50 a.m. and subjected to an intense but ineffective barrage. It was lost in cloud over Wood Green but caught by the searchlights at Waltham Abbey as it bombed Ponders End. At around 2:15 a.m. one of the three aircraft in the sky that night came into range, a B.E.2c piloted by Lieutenant William Leefe Robinson, flying from Suttons Farm. Robinson fired a drum of ammunition from his Lewis gun on each of three passes. As Robinson emptied the third drum, the airship began to burn from the stern and was quickly enveloped by flames. SL11 fell to the ground near Cuffley, witnessed by the crews of four of the Navy Zeppelins; there were no survivors. For bringing down the first rigid airship on British soil and the first 'night fighter' victory, Leefe Robinson received the Victoria Cross. The pieces of SL11 were gathered up and sold by the Red Cross to raise money for wounded soldiers. (Note: SL11 was described officially and in the press as Zeppelin L21 (the Army title of LZ61). The discrepancy persisted for decades, even though it is clear that the authorities knew that it was SL11. In 1984, Ray Rimell suggested that the reason for this confusion was a calculation by the British authorities that the shooting down of a hated and feared Zeppelin "baby killer" would make better propaganda with the public than the destruction of an almost unknown Schütte-Lanz type.)

The loss of SL11 ended the Army interest in raids on Britain. The Navy persisted and a 12-Zeppelin raid was launched on 23/24 September. Eight older airships bombed targets in the Midlands and the North-east, while four M-class Zeppelins (L30, L31, L32 and L33) attacked London. L30 did not cross the coast, dropping its bombs at sea. L31, approaching London from the south, dropped a few bombs on Kenley and Mitcham and was then illuminated by searchlights. Forty-one bombs were dropped in rapid succession over Streatham, killing seven people and wounding 27. More bombs were dropped on Brixton before crossing the river and dropping 10 bombs on Leyton, killing another eight people and injuring 30; L31 turned for home. Also coming in from the south was L32, delayed by engine problems. It dropped a few bombs on Sevenoaks and Swanley before crossing Purfleet at about 1:00 a.m. The Zeppelin then came under anti-aircraft fire as it dropped bombs on Aveley and South Ockendon. At 1:10 a.m., a B.E.2c piloted by 2nd Lieutenant Frederick Sowrey engaged L32. He fired three drums of incendiary ammunition and started a fire which quickly spread. The Zeppelin narrowly missed Billericay High Street, coming down at Snail's Hall Farm off Green Farm Lane, Great Burstead at 1:30 a.m. All 22 men of the crew were killed, with some, including the commander Oberleutnant-zur-See Werner Peterson, choosing to jump rather than burn to death. Witnesses said Paterson was still clutching the ship's log when he hit the ground. The crew of L32 were buried at Great Burstead Church on 27 September 1916.

L33 dropped a few incendiaries over Upminster before losing its way and making several turns, heading over London and dropping bombs on Bromley around midnight. As the bombs began to explode, the Zeppelin was hit by an anti-aircraft shell fired from the guns at either Beckton, Wanstead, or Victoria Park despite being at 13,000 ft (4,000 m). Dropping bombs now to shed weight, a large number fell on homes in Botolph Road and Bow Road. As the airship headed towards Chelmsford it continued to lose height, coming under fire at Kelvedon Hatch and briefly exchanging fire with a B.E.2c. Despite the efforts of the crew, L33 was forced to the ground at around 1:15 a.m. in a field close to New Hall Cottages, Little Wigborough. The airship was set alight and the crew headed south before being arrested by police at Peldon. Inspection of the wreckage provided the British with much information about the construction of Zeppelins, which was used in the design of the British R33-class airships. One 250 hp (190 kW) engine recovered from the wreck was substituted for two (of four) 180 hp (130 kW) engines on a Vickers-built machine, the hitherto underpowered R9.

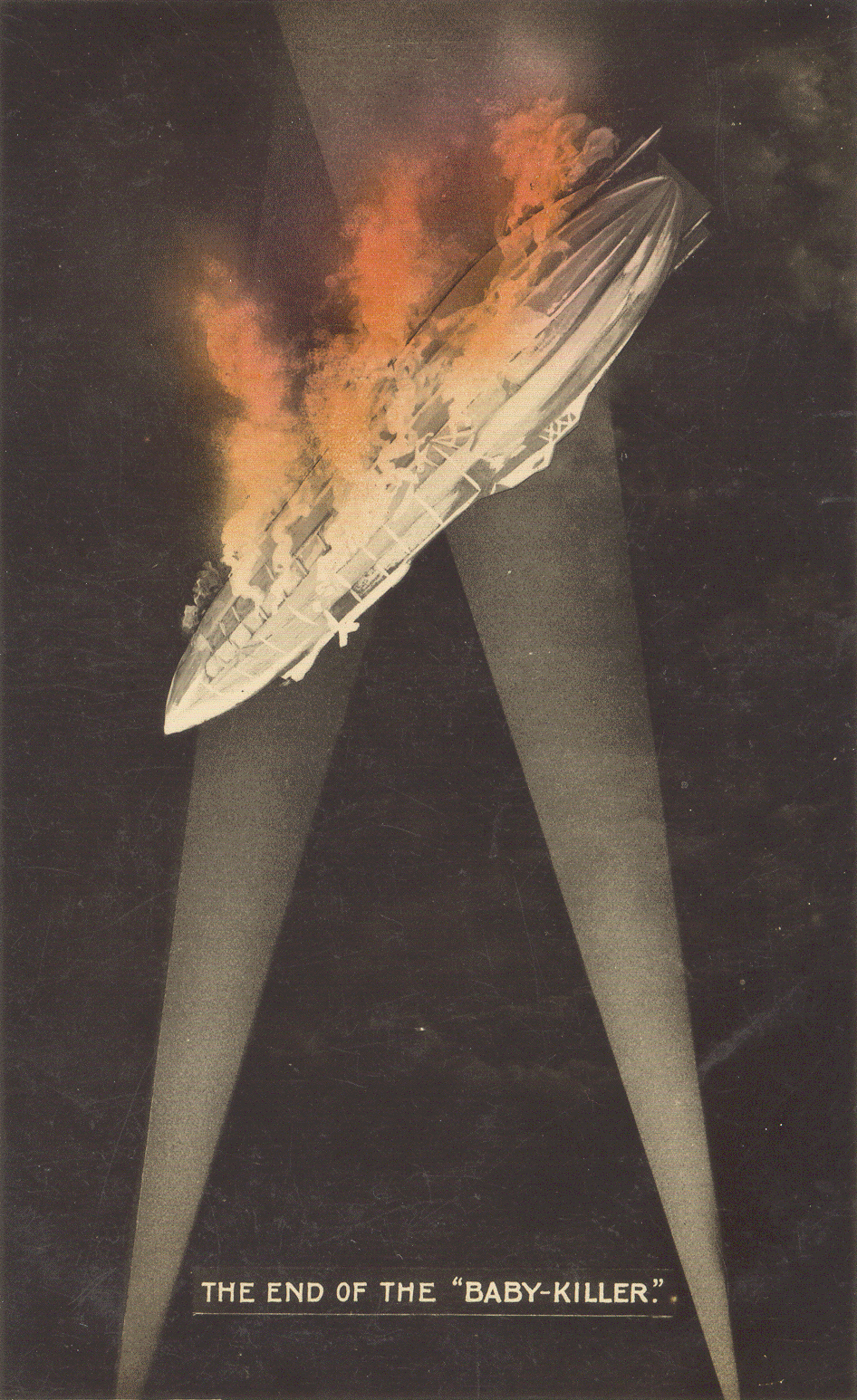
British propaganda postcard, entitled "The End of the 'Baby-Killer'"

The next raid came on 1 October 1916. Eleven Zeppelins were launched at targets in the Midlands and at London. Only L31 (Heinrich Mathy on his 15th raid, reaching London) overcame the weather. Approaching from Suffolk, L31 was picked up by the searchlights at Kelvedon Hatch around 9:45 p.m; turning away, the airship detoured over Harlow, Stevenage and Hatfield. As the airship neared Cheshunt at about 11:20 p.m. it was quickly picked up by six searchlights. Three aircraft of 39 Squadron were in the air and closed in. A B.E.2c piloted by 2nd Lieutenant Wulstan Tempest engaged the Zeppelin at around 11:50 p.m.; three bursts were sufficient to set fire to L31 and it crashed near Potters Bar with all 19 crew killed, Mathy jumping to his death. His body was found near the wreckage, embedded about 4 in (100 mm) in the ground. Tempest had dived out of the way of the stricken airship and crashed on landing, though without injury, possibly suffering from anoxia.

A raid on 27/28 November by L13, L14, L16, L21, L22, L24, L30, L34 (Kapitänleutnant Max Dietrich), L35 and L36 avoided London and the south of England, attacking targets in the Midlands and Tyneside. Halfway across the North Sea, L30 turned back with engine-trouble. The other airships crossed the sea in two groups, the first of five airships arriving between Scarborough and the Humber estuary and the other four heading for the Tyne. The bombing was largely ineffective, killed four people, injured 37 and caused £12,482 damage. L34 was shot down in flames off the coast at Hartlepool by 2nd Lieutenant Ian Pyott of 36 Squadron flying a B.E.2c. L21 was shot down by three aircraft near Yarmouth; Flt Sub-Lieutenant Edward Pulling was credited with the victory and awarded a Distinguished Service Order (DSO), the other pilots receiving the Distinguished Service Cross (DFC). The following day a LVG CIV made the first German aeroplane raid on London; hoping to hit the Admiralty, six 22 lb (10 kg) bombs were dropped between Victoria station and the Brompton Road.

There were no further raids in 1916 but the Navy lost three more airships on 28 December. SL12 came back damaged, made a bad landing and was destroyed overnight at Ahlhorn by strong winds. At Tønder ground crews handling L24 suffered an equipment failure and the ship crashed into a shed, bursting into flames and setting off L17, both being destroyed. German losses during 1916 led to attempts to make airships less vulnerable by increasing their ceiling. Zeppelins were lightened, principally by removing an engine, which increased their ceiling to over 16,000 ft (4,900 m) and new types with a lightened hull framework were developed. In late 1916, Germany had begun to plan Operation Turk's Cross (Unternehmen Türkenkreuz) a daylight bombing offensive against Britain using aeroplanes. Kampfgeschwader der Obersten Heeresleitung 3 (Kagohl 3), nicknamed the England Geschwader (England Squadron), was formed, consisting of six Kampfstaffeln (Kastas) commanded by Hauptmann Ernst Brandenburg.

== 1917 ==
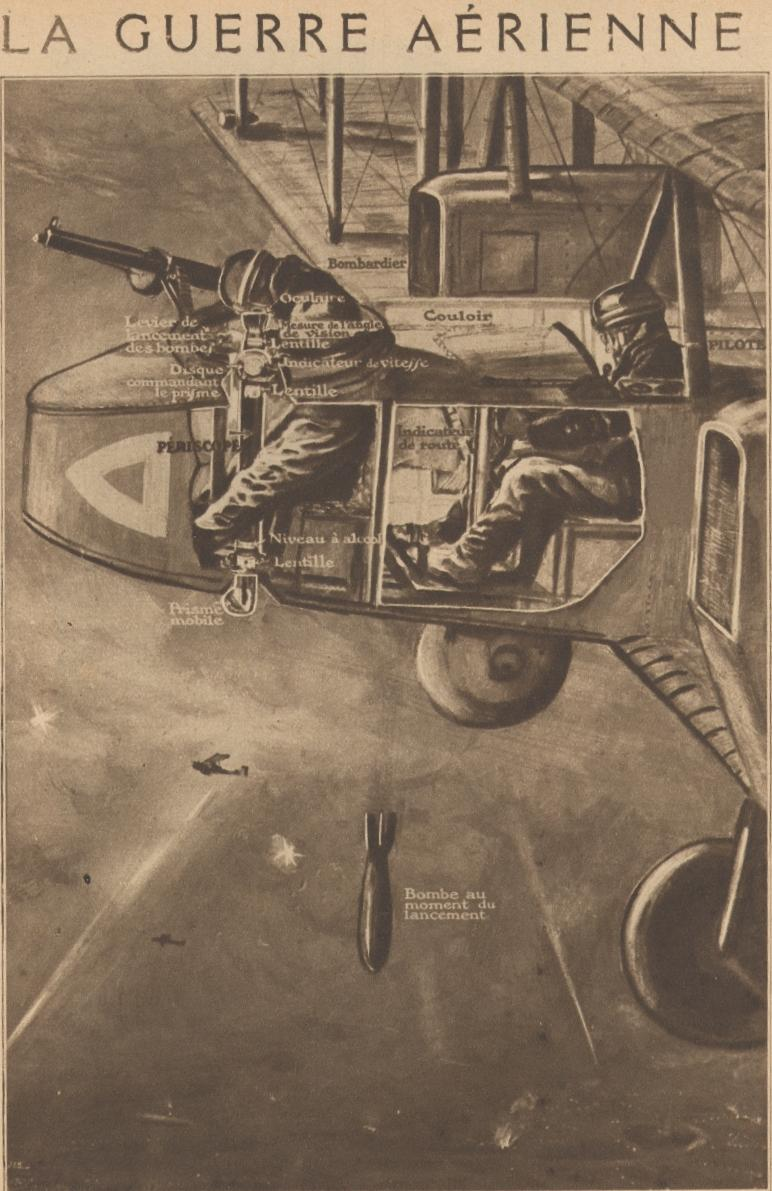
Contemporary illustration of a Gotha crew in action

Kagohl 3 was based temporarily at Ghistelles, which was too close to the Western Front and British aircraft, before moving 40 mi (64 km) back into German-occupied Belgium. Staffeln 13 and 14 to Sint-Denijs-Westrem 4.3 mi (7 km) south-west of Ghent and Staffeln 15 and 16 to Gontrode east of the town. When more Gothas were supplied Staffeln 17 and 18 moved to Mariakerke to the north-west of Ghent. Ghistelles continued as the main diversion airfield and the four bases were levelled to reduce damage to the Gotha undercarriages.

The first raid of 1917 took place on the night of 16/17 March. Five high-flying Zeppelins encountered very strong winds and none reached their targets. On the return flight, L39 (army name LZ86 Type R), commanded by Kapitänleutnant Koch, suffered an engine failure, was blown over French-held territory and brought down in flames near Compiègne by ground fire. The crew was killed and this was a serious blow to the army air effort because they had accumulated twenty months' experience in L24, SL3 and LZ86. On 23/24 May, six Zeppelins set out to bomb London but were frustrated by high winds and thick cloud. A few bombs were dropped on Suffolk, killing one person and causing damage valued at £599. German bombing over England on the nights of 13 June, carried out by Gotha Bombers and airships, among which was the L45, was met with anger by the British population. The raid caused 527 casualties, including 104 deaths, a number of which were children. The striking of a children's school in the raid and the death of a number of students prompted a plaque to be laid with a poem,

Those tiny school babes, our little ones.
Had ceased their task and were listening with bated breath,
For the blotting out of the glorious sun
By the broken thunder of the German Death.

=== Operation Turk's Cross ===
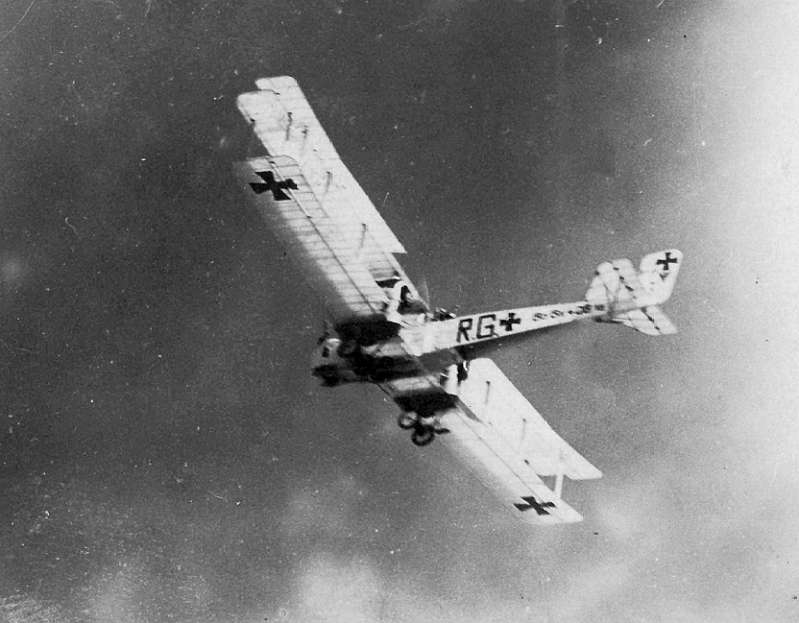
Gotha G.IV in flight

Kagohl 3 received the first Gotha G.IV aircraft in March and after a period of working up, the squadron had 18 Gothas in three flights (Staffeln). Operation Turk's Cross (Unternehmen Türkenkreuz) began at 2:00 p.m. on 25 May. Over Belgium the sky was mostly clear and no more than a quarter clouded. There was a light south-westerly wind, no more than 15 mph (24 km/h) at 2,000 ft (610 m), rising to 20 mph (32 km/h) at 9,000 ft (2,700 m). Over south-eastern England, the air was clear, with patches of mist and cloud, Essex being noticeably overcast. South of the Thames, the cloud was broken and the air was clear over south-east Kent. Kagohl 3 dispatched 12 Gothas to bomb London but two Gothas were forced to turn back over the North Sea due to mechanical difficulties. Ten bombers were sighted by the crew of the Tongue lightship at 4:45 p.m., making landfall at about 5:00 p.m. Cloud over London caused the Gothas to divert to secondary targets at the Channel port of Folkestone and the nearby Shorncliffe Army Camp.

At Shorncliff and Cheriton, 17 Canadian soldiers were killed and 93 wounded. At Folkestone a soldier and fifteen men, 31 women and 25 children were killed, eight soldiers, 23 men, 48 women and twelve children were wounded, most of the casualties occurring in Tontine Street, which was full of shoppers; 95 people were killed and 195 injured. As the formation flew out to sea under anti-aircraft gun fire, they were pursued by 33 RFC and 37 RNAS aircraft. Nine RFC aircraft took off from Detling, Bekesbourne and Throwley before 5:40 p.m. and saw the Gothas but their B.E.12s could not climb above 14,000 ft (4,300 m). A ferry pilot taking an aircraft from Lympne to France reached 14,500 ft (4,400 m) and attacked a Gotha at point-blank range but his gun failed to fire; by the time he cleared the stoppage the Gothas were out of range. Flight Lieutenant Leslie RNAS, took off from Dover at 6:20 p.m., caught up with the formation between Dover and Gravelines and attacked a Gotha at 12,000 ft (3,700 m), fired 150 rounds from 150–50 ft (46–15 m) seeing tracer enter the fuselage of the Gotha and black smoke pour from an engine. Leslie was engaged by another Gotha and went into a spin, losing contact with the formation. Nine RNAS Sopwith Pups from Dunkirk engaged the bombers near the Belgian coast. A captured German airman later said that a Gotha had been shot down off the Belgian coast, one crashed in Belgium and one landed damaged at St Denis Westrem. (Note: German records noted the deaths of Flugzeugführer Leutnant der Reserve Han-Hennig Parschau, beobachter Oberleutnant der Reserve Kurt Paul Kleeman and bordschütze Unteroffizier Alfred Dickhaut of Kagohl 3.)

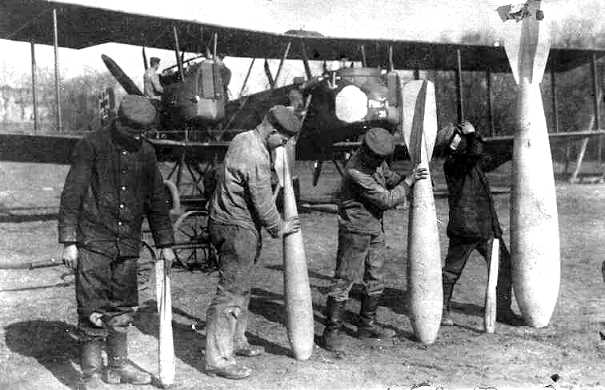
Types of German bomb

An attack on 5 June was diverted to Sheerness in Kent due to a poor weather forecast but a third raid on 13 June, taking off at 10:00 a.m., was the first daylight raid on London. As there had been little planning, early attempts to intercept the Gothas were ineffective. In England, 92 aircraft took to the air but few were able to climb high enough to engage the bombers. A Bristol F.2 Fighter of 35 (Training) Squadron flown by Captain John Cole-Hamilton with Captain C. H. C. Keevil as the observer, attacked three Gothas over Ilford but Keevil was hit by return-fire and killed instantly. British anti-aircraft guns near the coast managed to hit the aircraft of Captain T. Grant of 39 Squadron, who made a forced-landing at Rochford. As the Gothas flew on the crews could see aircraft taking off from airfields as they approached, the air peppered with smoke from anti-aircraft fire. Beyond Southend, the formation was approached by a Sopwith Triplane (114 mph (183 km/h), time to 10,000 ft (3,000 m), ten minutes) which fired at too great a distance to have an effect. Near Ostend, a British formation was spotted and one fighter made a head-on attack on a Gotha which was then attacked by a Sopwith Camel from the rear, hitting the aircraft with gunfire before the combined fire of several Gothas drove off the British fighters.

The raid caused 162 deaths and 432 injuries. Among the dead were 18 children, killed by a bomb falling on the Upper North Street School primary school in Poplar. The reason for the relatively large numbers of casualties seems to have been public ignorance as to the threat posed by aerial bombardment in daylight. Lieutenant Charles Chabot, a RFC pilot on leave, recorded that: "Raids hadn't become a very serious thing and everybody crowded out into the street to watch. They didn't take cover or dodge". This was the deadliest air raid of the war and no Gothas were lost. News of the raid was received enthusiastically in Germany and Brandenburg was summoned to Berlin to be awarded the Pour le Mérite, Germany's highest military honour. On taking off for the return journey, his aircraft had an engine failure; Brandenburg was severely injured and his pilot, Oberleutnant Freiherr von Trotha, was killed. (Note: In 1938, Air Commodore Lionel Charlton described the raid as "the beginning of a new epoch in the history of warfare".)

On the night of 16/17 June, an attempted raid by six Zeppelins met with some success; two airships were unable to leave their shed due to high winds and two more turned back with engine problems. Of the two that reached England, L42 hit a naval ammunition store in Ramsgate, while L48, the first U-class Zeppelin, was intercepted near Harwich and attacked by a DH.2 flown by Captain Robert Saundby, a F.E. 2b flown by Lt F. D. Holder and Sgt S. Ashby, and a B.E.12 flown by Pierce Watkins. The Zeppelin came down in flames near Theberton in Suffolk; Watkins was credited with the victory.

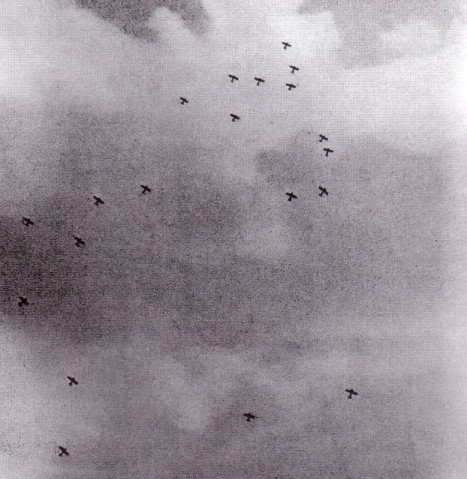
THe Gotha raid of 7 July 1917, seen from the ground.

A further Gotha raid of 22 aircraft was made on 7 July, resulting in 57 deaths and 193 injuries on the ground. One hundred sorties were flown against the formation, resulting in one Gotha shot down and three damaged for two fighters shot down. Felixstowe and Harwich were bombed on 22 July and Southend and Shoeburyness on 12 August, with the loss of one Gotha, four others crashing on landing. On 18 August, the largest raid of the war was attempted, despite a warning of unfavourable weather. Twenty-eight aircraft took off and soon encountered the predicted high winds; after nearly two hours in the air they had made so little progress that Zeebrugge was still in sight. After a further hour the English coast came into view, revealing that the Gothas were around 40 mi (64 km) off course. With barely enough fuel left to return to Belgium, the flight commander called off the attack. The high wind caused two aircraft to come down in the North Sea and others ran out of fuel and were lost making forced landings, two coming down in neutral Holland. On 22 August, 15 aircraft set out to attack Margate and Dover. Five turned back over the North Sea and the rest were met by heavy anti-aircraft fire and fighter aircraft over the Isle of Thanet. Two Gothas were shot down almost immediately and a third was shot down over Dover.

=== Night bombing ===
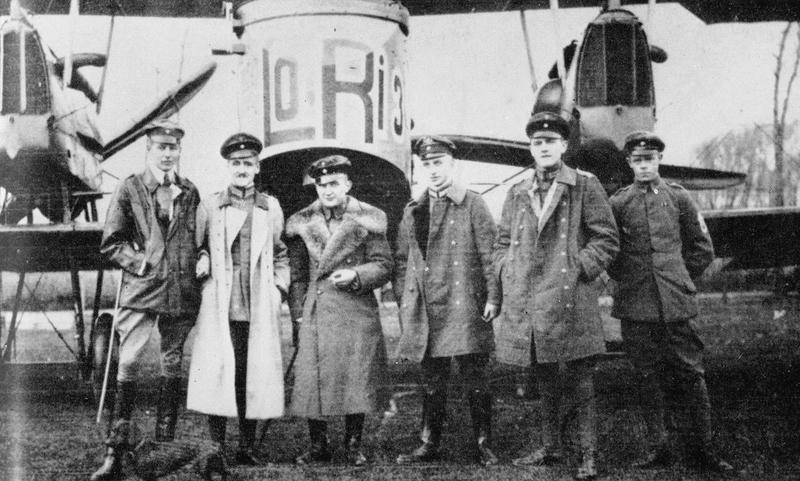
Members of Kagohl 3 in front of a Gotha, 1917

The improved British air defences forced Kagohl 3 to turn to night bombing, at first intended to be temporary until re-equipped with improved aircraft but the Gotha G V turned out to be a disappointment, no better than the G IV. The G V and later Gotha models, even the G VII, built to reach an altitude of 20,000–23,000 ft (6,000–7,000 m), were never delivered in sufficient numbers to make a return to day bombing feasible. Night raids provided a measure of protection from interceptors and anti-aircraft fire but they greatly complicated navigation and landing. Many damaged aircraft limped back to their airfields only to be lost in landing accidents.

The first night attack was an experimental raid by five Gothas on 3/4 September against Chatham. The weather was fine with patchy cloud and the wind was less than 10 mph (16 km/h) at 2,000 ft (610 m) and 20 mph (32 km/h) at 10,000 ft (3,000 m). At 10:35 p.m. they made landfall at Westgate in Kent heading south-east. As the aircraft flew over the Isle of Thanet they dropped two 26 lb (12 kg) bombs which fell on a farm. Five more bombs fell in fields and gardens at St Peter's, damaging several windowpanes. One aircraft flew out to sea at 10:45 p.m. and the other joined four aircraft flying up the Thames estuary. A 26 lb (12 kg) bomb from the formation fell on Chatham at 11:10 p.m. and another fell harmlessly in mud at the Rochester gasworks. A 110 lb (50 kg) bomb fell near the RNAS barracks in the town and two hit the drill hall, being used for accommodation for several hundred men. The explosions killed 130 sailors and wounded another 88, the tower clock stopping at 11:12 p.m. Another 26 lb (12 kg) bomb fell next to the barracks causing minor damage and two 110 lb (50 kg) bombs fell onto open ground in the docks, then three more 26 lb (12 kg) bombs fell, one exploding on the roof of a school causing much damage. The second 26 lb (12 kg) bomb broke some windowpanes and the third fell near the Sally Port, wounding five people, one mortally. More bombs were dropped to little effect on Gillingham and several window panes broken in Luton. A woman was killed and two wounded by a 110 lb (50 kg) bomb but all the other bombs dropped sufficed only to injure a boy and damage some property. South of Chatham two more 26 lb (12 kg) bombs were dropped to no effect. None of the local anti-aircraft guns engaged the bombers which were invisible in the dark. The bombing of the RNAS barracks caused the worst death toll of the war.

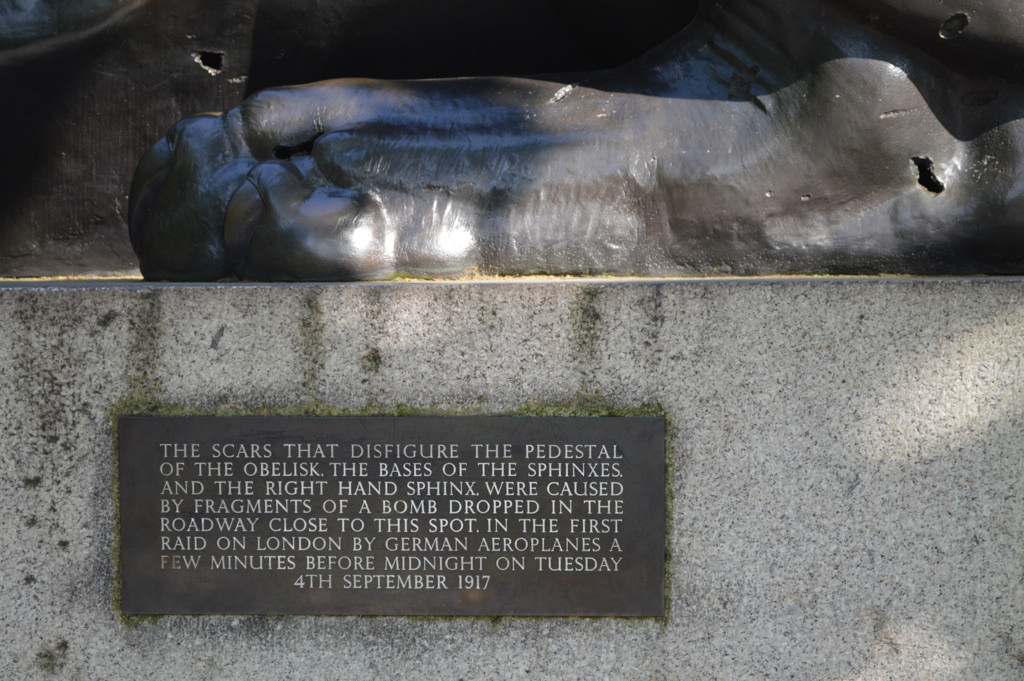
A plaque on one of the sphinxes flanking Cleopatra's Needle, commemorating the first night raid on London by aeroplanes on 4 September 1917; a passing tram was also destroyed.

Encouraged by the lack of night defences, a raid on London was carried out the following night. Of the eleven aircraft which set out, nine reached England and five got as far as London; 18 British defensive sorties were flown but none made contact. The defensive flights were significant in that the aircraft used included Sopwith Camels, proving that it was practical to fly the type at night. One Gotha failed to return, probably shot down by anti-aircraft fire from Fort Borstal near Rochester. Six raids followed at the end of September. These included the first raids on England by the enormous Riesenflugzeuge of Riesenflugzeug-Abteilung (Rfa) 501. On 24 September 16 Gothas set off and 13 reached England, most bombing Dover and other targets in Kent, with only five reaching London. This coincided with an unsuccessful Zeppelin attack on the Midlands. The following night 15 Gothas set out, with similar results, only three aircraft reaching London. One of the bombers came down in the North Sea, probably the victim of a Sopwith 1½ Strutter flown by Douglas Bell and George Williams of 78 Squadron. On 28 September 25 Gothas and two Riesenflugzeuge took off but most turned back due to adverse weather. Three people were wounded and £129 damage was caused, for the cost of three Gothas lost and six damaged on landing.

The following night seven Gothas and three Riesenflugzeuge took off, killing 40 people and injuring 87 for the loss of one aircraft. By this time the population of London was thoroughly alarmed, with up to 300,000 people seeking shelter in Underground stations and others leaving London to sleep in whatever accommodation was available, some in fields. On 30 September 11 Gothas set off to raid London and on 1 October 18 took off, eleven reaching England. Over 14,000 rounds were fired by British anti-aircraft guns without scoring a hit. By now shells were in short supply and many of the guns had fired so many rounds that their barrels were worn out. The Government reallocated new 3 in (76 mm) guns from arming merchant ships against submarines, to the defence of London. The barrage was also proving hazardous to those on the ground, in that week eight people had been killed and another 67 injured by falling fragments.

=== 'Silent' Zeppelin raid on London ===
The last attack by Zeppelins on London took place on the night of 19 October 1917. It had been over 12 months since the last Zeppelin raid, during which time the ceiling of German airships had been improved to a height that existing aeroplanes could not reach. Their undersides had also been coated with a special non-reflective black paint, rendering them almost invisible to searchlights. Up to eleven Zeppelins including LZ85, approached London from the north, with a few bombs falling north of Watford being reported from around 9:00 p.m. The wind was freshening from the north-west. The commander of the Western sub-section of the London Air Defence Area, Lt-Col. Alfred Rawlinson (holder of Royal Aero Club Aviator's Licence No. 3 and brother of Sir Henry Rawlinson), surmised that the airships were likely to switch off their engines; carried silently on the wind over central London, they would drop their bombs undetected.

Rawlinson ordered all the searchlights in the London area to be switched off, since they would 'give the game away'. A bomb was dropped at around 11:30 p.m. on the heart of the West End, destroying the premises of Swan & Edgar in Piccadilly Circus but the ground defences remained silent. Another bomb fell on Grove Park, Lewisham a few minutes later but the deception worked; London avoided up to 200 bombs. None of the Zeppelins made it back to their base in German Jutland. Blown by the increasing gale, one was brought down by French anti-aircraft guns at 7:00 a.m. on 18 October near the German frontier at Luneville, another was forced to land at 9:20 a.m. near Bourbonne-les-Bains in western France by pursuing aeroplanes, two came down and were destroyed by fire near Gap, France in the Hautes-Alpes département in south-west France at 2:00 p.m. Three more were carried out to sea and were lost over the Mediterranean with all hands when their fuel ran out.

=== Further Gotha raids ===
The RNAS and RFC carried out bombing raids on German bomber airfields at St Denis-Westrem and Gontrode, forcing the squadrons to relocate to Mariakerke and Oostakker, with the staff headquarters moving to Ghent. The next raid against England was carried out on 29 October, when three aircraft set out, two diverting to Calais because of the weather and the third dropping its bombs on the Essex coast. The following night a big raid was mounted, the bomb load including large numbers of a new 10 lb (4.5 kg) incendiary bomb. Twenty-two Gothas took off, of which over half released their bombs on Kent, with little effect other than the destruction of a gasometer in Ramsgate. Bombs were dropped on the eastern suburbs of London but many of the incendiaries failed to ignite and five aircraft crashed when attempting to land.

Poor weather prevented raids in November and the Gotha crews occupied themselves with training flights. To lessen the chance of a raid meeting adverse weather, in December the Germans began to send out a radio-equipped Rumpler C.IV to make weather observations off the English coast. The weather cleared on 5 December, when 19 Gothas and two Riesenflugzeuge attacked in waves. Casualties caused by the raid were light but over £100,000 of damage was caused, mostly in London. Two Gothas were brought down by anti-aircraft fire and one with engine trouble, attempted a landing at Rochford aerodrome, struck a tree on approach and crashed. The second aircraft came down near Canterbury and in both cases all the crew survived but a third aircraft and crew was reported missing.

== 1918 ==
The Englandgeschwader (England Squadron) had an inauspicious new year when, on 17 January, two crews were killed while testing their aircraft. On 25 January, a raid was cancelled because of fog but on 28 January, during the full moon period, 13 Gothas and two Riesenflugzeuge (Giants) took off into a clear sky but a thick mist began to spread. Six of the Gothas turned back before reaching England and the rest made landfall at about 8:00 p.m. Over a hundred British night-fighter sorties were flown, resulting in one Gotha being shot down after being subjected to a co-ordinated attack by two Camels from 40 Squadron RFC, flown by Second Lieutenants Charles (Sandy) Banks and George Hackwill, the first victory for night-fighters against a heavier-than-air bomber over Britain; both pilots were awarded the DFC. Both fighters carried a new gun sight invented by Lieutenant H. B. Neame of the Technical Directorate. The apparatus was an illuminated ring sight with the ring size set for the 77 ft (23 m) wingspan of a Gotha to fill it at 100 yd (91 m), the best range for opening fire. The Giant had a wingspan twice that of a Gotha, unknown to British pilots, which may have induced them to open fire when well out of range.

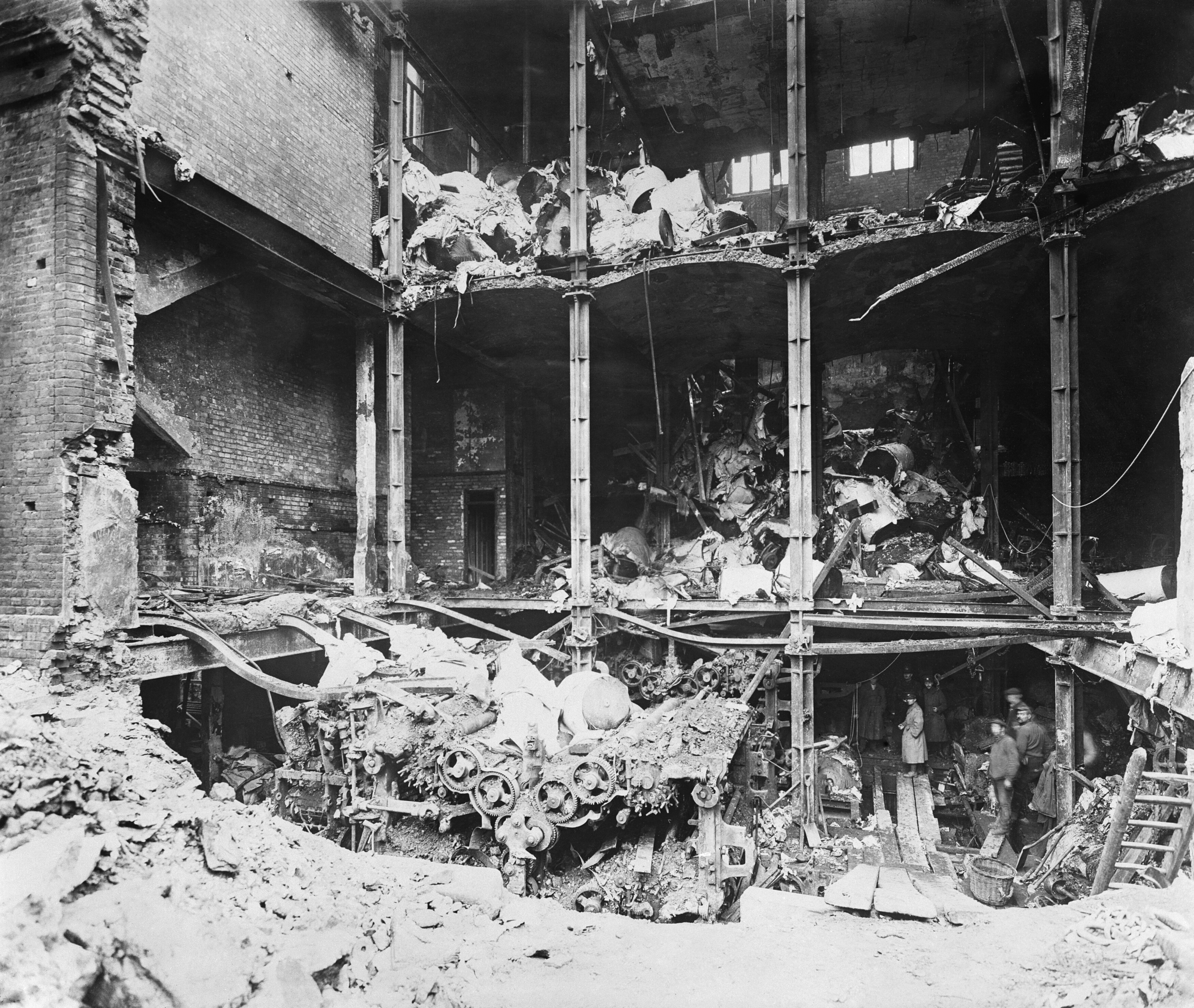
The Odhams print works which was hit while being used as an air raid shelter; 38 people were killed and 85 injured.

The bombing killed 67 people and injured 166; the casualties included 14 dead and 14 injured in stampedes when people queuing for admission to shelters were alarmed by maroons, set off to warn of a raid but mistaken for exploding bombs; another 11 people were injured by shell splinters from exploded anti-aircraft shells. Many of the other casualties were caused by a 660 lb (300 kg) bomb, which fell on the Odhams printing works in Long Acre, which was being used as a shelter. After the losses at the end of 1917, the loss of one Gotha and damage to four more in landing accidents led to the suspension of operations against England, pending the reorganisation of the squadron and replacement of aircraft and crews.

The following night, the first raid undertaken by Giants unaccompanied by Gothas, took place. Four aircraft from Rfa 501 took off from Gontrode and St Denis-Westrem, each with a 2,200 lb (1,000 kg) bomb load. R12 turned back with engine trouble over the Channel and turned back, dumping its bombs on British positions near Gravelines. R25, R26 and R39 crossed the English coast to the north of the Thames Estuary. Misled by the sound of the Giants's engines observers warned that a minimum of fifteen aircraft were aloft and eighty fighters were scrambled. R26 had trouble in two of its engines, was forced to turn back by anti-aircraft fire at Billericay and bombed Rawreth, Thundersley and Rayleigh and at sea at the Blackwater and Margate. Three houses were damaged and a farm building at Rawreth were damaged.

One Giant approaching London was attacked at 12,000 ft (3,700 m) by a B.E.12 from 37 Squadron, both aircraft hitting the other. The Giant turned west and bombed Isleworth, Kew and Brentford, causing damage to several houses, killing ten people and wounding ten. As the Giant flew for home it was attacked over Gravesend and the attacker fired 100 rounds before breaking off the attack after losing his night vision when a tracer bullet hit a propeller blade. Another Giant was spotted on its approach above North Benfleet in Essex; four pilots attacked the Giant whose crew dumped its bombs near Wanstead for no result. The British pilots continued to attack as the Giant turned for home but despite attacks until the Giant reached the coast at Eastchurch, the aircraft flew on.

Rfa 501 attacked again on the night of 16/17 February, four aircraft reached England, one carrying a 2,200 lb (1,000 kg) bomb which, aimed at Victoria station, fell half a mile away on the Royal Hospital, Chelsea. An aircraft attacked the following night, hit St Pancras station; 21 people were killed and 32 injured. Another Giant raid took place on 7 March; five aircraft reached England, one carrying a 2,200 lb (1,000 kg) bomb, which fell on Warrington Crescent near Paddington station. Among the dead was Lena Ford, who had written the lyrics of the popular wartime song Keep the Home Fires Burning.

On 12 March, five Zeppelins attempted a raid on the Midlands but headwinds caused them to mistake their position and two dropped their bombs in the sea, the rest bombing the Hull area with little effect, their commanders thinking that they were over Leeds. Another raid was attempted the following night but only one of the three airships reached England, bombing Hartlepool. The bombs killed eight people and an RFC pilot was killed when he flew into Pontop Pike near Dipton, County Durham. A third airship raid took place on 12 April, the altitude at which the airships flew and weather caused navigational problems; although attacks were claimed on towns in the Midlands, most of the bombs fell in open country. Seven people were killed, 20 injured and £11,673 damage was caused.

By the middle of March, the Gotha squadron was ready to resume raiding but had to support the German spring offensive which started on 21 March, being used to bomb Calais, Dunkirk, Boulogne and troop concentrations and railways. On 9 May, Rfa 501 suffered a calamity when four aircraft attempted to bomb Dover. High winds caused them to be recalled when over the Channel, by which time fog had covered their base. One aircraft landed safely, the crew of a second survived a crash in which the aircraft was written off and the remaining two crashed with the loss of all but one member of each crew.

The last and largest aeroplane raid of the war took place on the night of 19 May 1918, when 38 Gothas and 3 Giants took off against London. Six Gothas were shot down by night-fighters and anti-aircraft fire; a seventh aircraft was forced to land after being intercepted by a Bristol fighter of 141 Squadron from Biggin Hill. Lieutenant Edward Turner and Lieutenant Henry Barwise fought a long engagement with the Gotha. This was the first victory of the war for Biggin Hill, for which Turner and Barwise were awarded the Distinguished Flying Cross. The British estimated that 2,700 lb (1,200 kg) of bombs were dropped, although the German figure was 3,200 lb (1,500 kg); 49 people were killed, 177 injured and damage was put at £117,317.

After this raid, Kagohl 3 and Rfa 501 principally flew in support of the army. The development of the 2.2 lb (1 kg) B-1E Elektronbrandbombe incendiary bomb, led to a project, Der Feuerplan (the Fire Plan), which involved the use of all of the German heavy bomber fleet, flying in waves over London and Paris and dropping all the incendiaries that they could carry, then returning to base to rearm and attack again until they were either shot down or the crews were too exhausted to fly. The hope was that the two capitals would be destroyed in an inextinguishable blaze, causing the Allies to sue for peace. Thousands of Elektron bombs were delivered to bomber bases and the operation was scheduled for August and again in early September 1918 but on both occasions, the order to take off was countermanded at the last moment, perhaps because of the fear of Allied reprisals, Germany being on the brink of surrender.

The last Zeppelin raid on Britain took place on 5 August 1918, when four Zeppelins bombed targets in the Midlands and the North of England. The airships reached the British coast before dark and were sighted by the Leman Tail lightship 30 mi (48 km) north-east of Happisburgh at 8:10 p.m., although defending aircraft were not alerted until 8:50 p.m. Despite thick cloud, two aircraft intercepted the new L70, which was carrying Peter Strasser, Führer der Luftschiffe of the German Imperial Navy, as an observer. The Zeppelin was shot down in flames with no survivors. Egbert Cadbury and Robert Leckie flying a DH.4 were credited with the victory. The remaining airships dropped their bombs blind, relying on radio bearings for navigational information and none fell on land. An attempt was made to salvage the wreckage of L 70 and most of the structure was brought ashore, providing the British a great deal of technical information; the bodies of the crew were buried at sea.

== Analysis ==
Weather and night flying made airship navigation and accurate bombing difficult. Bombs were often dropped miles off target (a raid on London hit Hull) and hitting military installations was a matter of luck. Civilian casualties made the Zeppelins objects of hatred. British defensive measures made airship raids much riskier and in 1917 they were largely replaced by aeroplanes. The military effect of the raids was small but they caused alarm, disruption to industrial production and the diversion of resources from the Western Front. Concern about the conduct of the defence against the raids, the responsibility for which was divided between the Admiralty and the War Office, led to a parliamentary inquiry under Jan Smuts and the creation of the Royal Air Force (RAF) on 1 April 1918. Although the Germans' main aim had been to demoralise the British public and start a clamour for an end to the war, the actual result was a widespread demand for the revenge bombing of German cities.

Airships made 51 bombing raids on Britain during the war in which 557 people were killed and 1,358 injured. The airships dropped 5,806 bombs [total weight of about 192 long tons (195 t)] causing damage worth £1,527,585. Eighty-four airships took part, of which 30 were either shot down or lost in accidents. Aeroplanes carried out 52 raids, dropping 2,772 bombs of 73.5 long tons (74.7 t) weight for the loss of 62 aircraft, killing 857 people, injuring 2,058 and causing £1,434,526 of damage. The German bombing has been called, by some authors, the first Blitz, alluding to the Blitz of the Second World War.

As it became clear in the 1930s that another European war might be possible, British strategists and politicians sought to draw on the experience of the bombing campaign. Air Ministry planners extrapolated the casualty statistics to take account of what a more capable and numerous bomber fleet might achieve and predicted that London might suffer 600,000 deaths in a war; the British Government established a comprehensive scheme of Air Raid Precautions including planning the evacuations of civilians from likely targets. The air defence organisation developed in 1917 was modernised as the Dowding system used in the Battle of Britain; the RAF built up Bomber Command, a strategic bombing force. The Germans took the opposite view; noting the cost and poor results of the strategic bombing campaign, the Luftwaffe concentrated on close air support on the battlefield and entered the Second World War without any heavy bomber aircraft.

== Bibliography ==
Books

- Baughen, G. (2014). Blueprint for Victory: Britain's First World War Blitzkrieg Air Force. Stroud: Fonthill Media. ISBN 978-1-78155-392-3.
- Boyne, Walter J. (2003). The Influence of Air Power on History. Gretna, LA: Pelican. ISBN 978-1-58980-034-2 – via Archive Foundation.
- Bruce, J. M. (1996). Rimmell, R. L. (ed.). Vickers FB5. Windsock Datafile (56). Berkhamstead: Albatros Productions. ISBN 0-948414-75-8.
- Castle, Ian (2008). London 1914–1917: The Zeppelin Menace. Campaign (193). Oxford: Osprey. ISBN 978-1-84603-245-5.
- Castle, Ian (2015). The First Blitz: Bombing London During WWI. Oxford: Osprey. ISBN 978-1-4728-1529-3.
- Charlton, Lionel (1938). The Air Defence of Britain. Penguin Special S8. London: Penguin. OCLC 1112518701.
- Cole, Christopher; Cheesman, E. F. (1984). The Air Defence of Britain 1914–1918. London: Putnam. ISBN 0-370-30538-8.
- Fegan, Thomas (2002). The Baby Killers: German Air Raids on Britain in the First World War. London: Leo Cooper. ISBN 978-0-85052-893-0.
- Fredette, Raymond H. (1976). The Sky on Fire: The First Battle of Britain 1917–1918. New York: Harvest. ISBN 0-15-682750-6.
- Grosz, Peter (2000). Gotha G.I. Windsock Datafile (83). Berkhamsted: Albatros. ISBN 978-1-902207-25-4.
- Gutmann, Jon (2018). Zeppelin vs British Home Defence 1915–18. Oxford: Osprey. ISBN 978-1-47-282033-4.
- Hanson, Neil (19 May 2008). First Blitz: The Secret German Plan to Raze London to the Ground in 1918. London: Doubleday. ISBN 978-0-385-61170-1.
- Hanson, Neil (2009) [2008 Doubleday]. First Blitz: The Secret German Plan to Raze London to the Ground in 1918 (paperback ed.). London: Corgi Books. ISBN 978-0-552-15548-9 – via Archive Foundation.
- Hare, P. R. (1999). Aeroplanes of the Royal Aircraft Factory. Crowood Aviation. Marlborough: The Crowood Press. ISBN 1-86126-209-4.
- Hyde, Andrew (18 October 2012). The First Blitz: The German Air Campaign Against Britain, 1917–1918. Pen & Sword Military. ISBN 978-1-78159-124-6.
- Jones, H. A. (2009d) [1928]. The War in the Air, Being the Story of the Part played in the Great War by the Royal Air Force. History of the Great War Based on Official Documents by Direction of the Historical Section of the Committee of Imperial Defence. Vol. II (Imperial War Museum Department of Printed Books and Naval & Military Press ed.). London: Clarendon Press. ISBN 978-1-84342-413-0 – via Archive Foundation.
- Jones, H. A. (2009a) [1931]. The War in the Air, Being the Story of the Part played in the Great War by the Royal Air Force. History of the Great War Based on Official Documents by Direction of the Historical Section of the Committee of Imperial Defence. Vol. III (pbk. facs. repr. Imperial War Museum Department of Printed Books and Naval & Military Press, Uckfield ed.). London: Clarendon Press. ISBN 978-1-84342-414-7 – via Archive Foundation.
- Jones, H. A. (2009c) [1935]. The War in the Air Being the Part played in the Great War by the Royal Air Force. History of the Great War Based on Official Documents by Direction of the Historical Section of the Committee of Imperial Defence. Vol. V (pbk. facs. repr. Imperial War Museum Department of Printed Books and Battery Press, Uckfield ed.). London: Clarendon Press. ISBN 978-1-84342-416-1 – via Archive Foundation.
- Jones, H. A. (2009e) [1934]. The War in the Air Being the Part played in the Great War by the Royal Air Force Appendices. History of the Great War Based on Official Documents by Direction of the Historical Section of the Committee of Imperial Defence. Vol. VI (pbk. facs. repr. Imperial War Museum Department of Printed Books and Battery Press, Uckfield ed.). London: Clarendon Press. ISBN 978-1-84342-411-6 – via Archive Foundation.
- Liddell Hart, Basil Henry (1934). A History of the World War 1914–1918. Faber and Faber. OCLC 153788390.
- Parker, N. J. (2019a) [2015]. Gott Strafe England: The German Air Assault against Great Britain 1914–1916. Vol. I (2nd pbk. ed.). Warwick: Helion. ISBN 978-1-911628-37-8.
- Parker, N. J. (2019) [2016]. Gott Strafe England: The German Air Assault against Great Britain 1914–1918. Vol. II (2nd pbk. ed.). Warwick: Helion. ISBN 978-1-911628-39-2.
- Rawlinson, Alfred; Scott, Percy (1923). The Defence of London: 1915–1918 (2nd ed.). London, New York: Andrew Melrose. OCLC 906277649 – via Archive Foundation.
- Rimell, Raymond Laurence (1984). Zeppelin! A Battle for Air Supremacy in World War I. London: Conway Maritime Press. ISBN 978-0-920002-27-8.
- Robinson, Douglas H. (1994) [1971]. The Zeppelin in Combat: A History of the German Naval Airship Division, 1912–1918. Schiffer Military/Aviation History (3rd illus. Schiffer, Atglen PA ed.). Henley-on-Thames: Foulis. ISBN 978-0-88740-510-5.
- Storey, N. R. (2015). Zeppelin Blitz: The German Air Raids on Great Britain during the First World War (ebook ed.). Stroud: The History Press. ISBN 978-0-7509-6321-3.
