= Zeppelin LZ 85 =

LZ 85 (tactical number L 45)
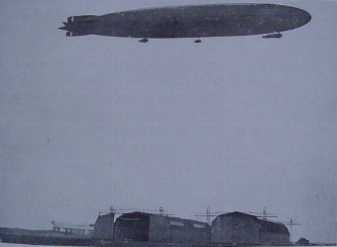
- LZ 85 (L 45) over Tønder

General information
- Type: Type r Super Zeppelin - rigid reconnaissance-bomber airship
- National origin: Imperial Germany
- Manufacturer: Zeppelin Luftschiffbau
- Designer: Ludwig Dürr
- Status: Destroyed in forced landing
- Primary user: Kaiserliche Marine
- Number built: 1

History
- First flight: 12 April 1917
- Retired: 20 October 1917

The LZ 85, tactical number L 45, also known as Zeppelin of Laragne by the French public, was a World War I R-Class zeppelin of the German Navy that carried out a total of 27 flights, including 3 raids on England and 12 reconnaissance missions.

== Construction ==
LZ 85 was an R-Class zeppelin built by Luftschiffbau Zeppelin at Staaken, Germany during the First World War and completed on 2 April 1917, to join the ranks of the German Kaiserliche Marine in the fight against the United Kingdom.

In six-engined configuration the R-class zeppelins had single pusher engines in the rear of the front control gondola and two engine cars either side amidships, with a further three engines in the rear gondola. Of the rear gondola engines, one drove a pusher propeller direct at the rear of the gondola and two more in the centre of the gondola drove propellers, via gearboxes and transmission shafts, mounted on framework either side of the gondola. Five-engined R-class zeppelins omitted the rear gondola direct-drive centre engine.

The 19 crew members were housed in the control cabin, rear gondola, two engine cars and open gun positions on top of the envelope.

== War career ==
LZ 85 conducted its first flight on 12 April 1917 from Staaken to Ahlhorn under the command of Kapitänleutnant Waldemar Kölle and first officer Oberleutnant zur See Bernhard Dinter. Dinter would be replaced in May by Lieutenant Colonel Schiltz; Dinter himself would take the command of another zeppelin in June. LZ 85 was stationed at Ahlhorn until it was moved to Tønder on 5 June 1917.

=== Bombing raid on Norfolk ===
The LZ 85 conducted its first bombing raid on Britain on the night of 23 May and 24 May 1917. The ship took off from Ahlhorn and joined five other naval airships whose objective was to attack London. However the weather worsened and dense clouds were beginning to cover the East of England and by the time the airships crossed over Suffolk and Norfolk, they were caught in a thunderstorm. Sixty bombs were dropped over East Anglia which killed one person and L 40 was chased by a seaplane near Terschelling. The raid was deemed a failure because of the cloud cover and wind.

=== August 1917 bombing raid on warships ===
LZ 85 started its second bombing raid against Britain during the night of 21 August and 22 August 1917. The ship left its base in Tønder and joined seven other airships to conduct a bombing raid on East Yorkshire. The raid was personally led by airship fleet commander Peter Strasser who was on the L 46. LZ 85 failed to fly inland to conduct its mission and instead bombed a number of allied warships off Withernsea.

== Silent raid of October 1917 and crash ==
The LZ 85 conducted its last bombing raid on Britain on the night of 19 October and 20 October 1917. The ship took off from Tønder and joined 10 other naval airships. The raid took place at such a great height that no British fighters could reach high enough to shoot the attacking zeppelins down, giving the airships a huge advantage. The airships reached Britain undisturbed and dropped 274 bombs from a record height of well over 5 kilometres (3.1 mi).

=== Bombing of Northampton ===
LZ 85 was ordered to bomb Sheffield and it reached the shore at Withernsea at 8.20pm, but she had to turn to the southwest before being ordered to go further to Leicester at 9.50pm. Once at Leicester LZ 85 was spotted by a Royal Aircraft Factory FE.2b from the Royal Flying Corps, which fired three rounds at the airship, but was not able to keep pace with it. LZ 85 continued southward to Northampton which she reached at 10.45pm, dropping 22 bombs, including 9 firebombs, over Kingsthorpe, Dallington, Far Cotton and St. James End districts. The fifth bomb that was dropped passed through the roof of 46 Parkwood Street, just west of the train station, killing Mrs Eliza Gammons instantly while she was sleeping in her bedroom. Her 13-year-old twin daughters, Gladys and Lily, who were also in the house, died later from their burns. One of the bombs dropped on Northampton, which did not explode, is now on display at Sywell Aviation Museum, 10 kilometres (6.2 mi) northeast of Northampton.

=== The attack on London ===
LZ 85 continued southward, when at 11.30pm the ship bathed in light from searchlight batteries over northwest London. The commander took the opportunity and started bombing the city. The first bomb came down near Hendon Aerodrome, damaging the Grahame-White aircraft manufacturer. Another bomb just missed Cricklewood railway station. When LZ 85 reached the City of London, she dropped a 300 kg (660 lb) high explosive bomb on Piccadilly Circus, which smashed the entire facade of the Swan & Edgar department store, killing five men and two women, and also wounding 18 others, that were mostly waiting for a bus. The bomb blew a hole 3 metres (9 ft 10 in) in diameter and 1.2 metres (3 ft 11 in) in depth down to a cellar under the street between the department store and a tea shop Cabin.

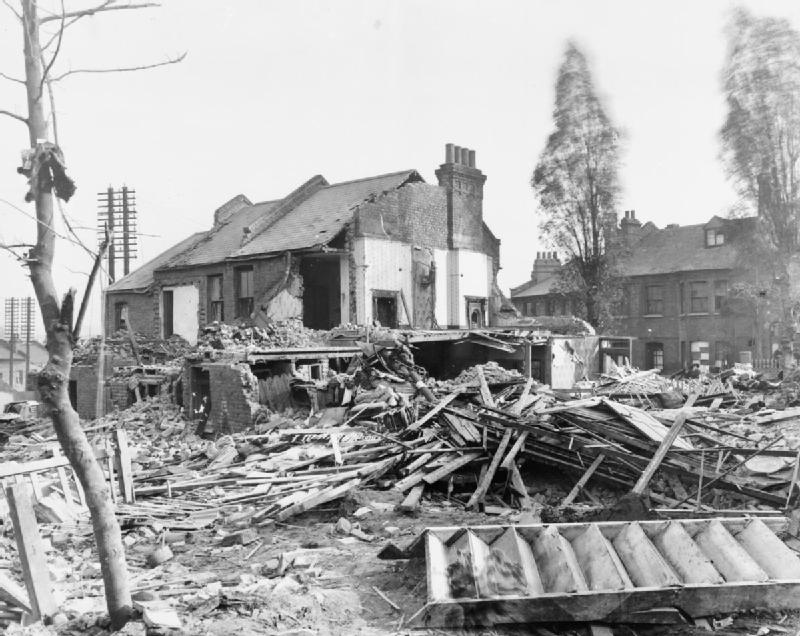
Hither Green bomb damage after the raid

While continuing its flight over London, LZ 85 encountered a Royal Aircraft Factory BE.2c fighter, but escaped by turning southward and climbing to an extreme height. When the airship was in safety, it dropped another bomb in Southwark, south of the River Thames, where it destroyed three houses in Albany Road near Burgess Park, killing 10 to 12 people and wounding many others. The airship dropped another bomb on Hither Green in the southeastern district of Lewisham and destroyed 26 small houses. In this attack, 15 people were killed including 12 children or teenagers and eight others were wounded. Of the 12 children whom were killed, 8 were from the Kingston family and 4 from the Milgate family. Meanwhile, on the ground, British searchlight batteries tried to locate LZ 85 but, in the hazy weather high above London, the airship could not be found. LZ 85 tried to descend to a lower altitude, but was pursued by a Royal Aircraft Factory BE.2c flown by Lieutenant Pritchard. On gaining altitude LZ 85 encountered strong turbulence and frost, which caused a number of mechanical problems including steering problems, an engine failure and fuel leaks. On top of that, the crew began suffering from altitude sickness.

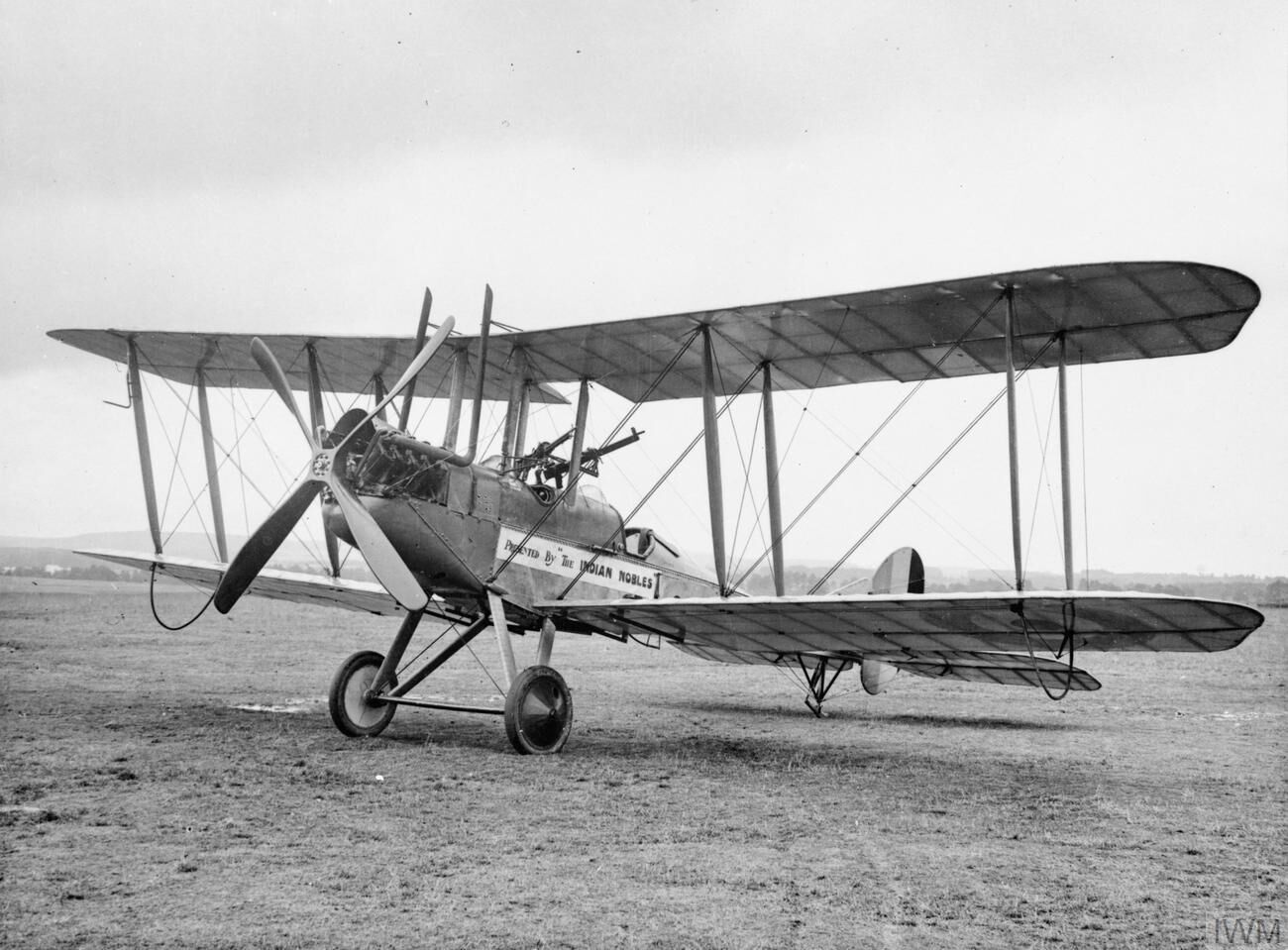
A BE2 fighter, the same type of aircraft that was used by Lieutenant Pritchard to chase LZ 85

=== Forced landing in France ===
LZ 85 escaped Britain and flew over the English Channel towards Belgium and France. However, due to its long duration at an extreme height and the numerous mechanical problems, including fuel leaks, the ship was left to the mercy of the weather as the fuel ran out. The ship drifted over Amiens and Compiègne, heading toward neutral Switzerland. When passing by Lyon, at a height of 500 m (1,600 ft), a fighter took off from Meyzieu east of the city, following the airship to the south of Saint-Marcellin, but had to give up the chase and return to Meyzieu due to lack of fuel.

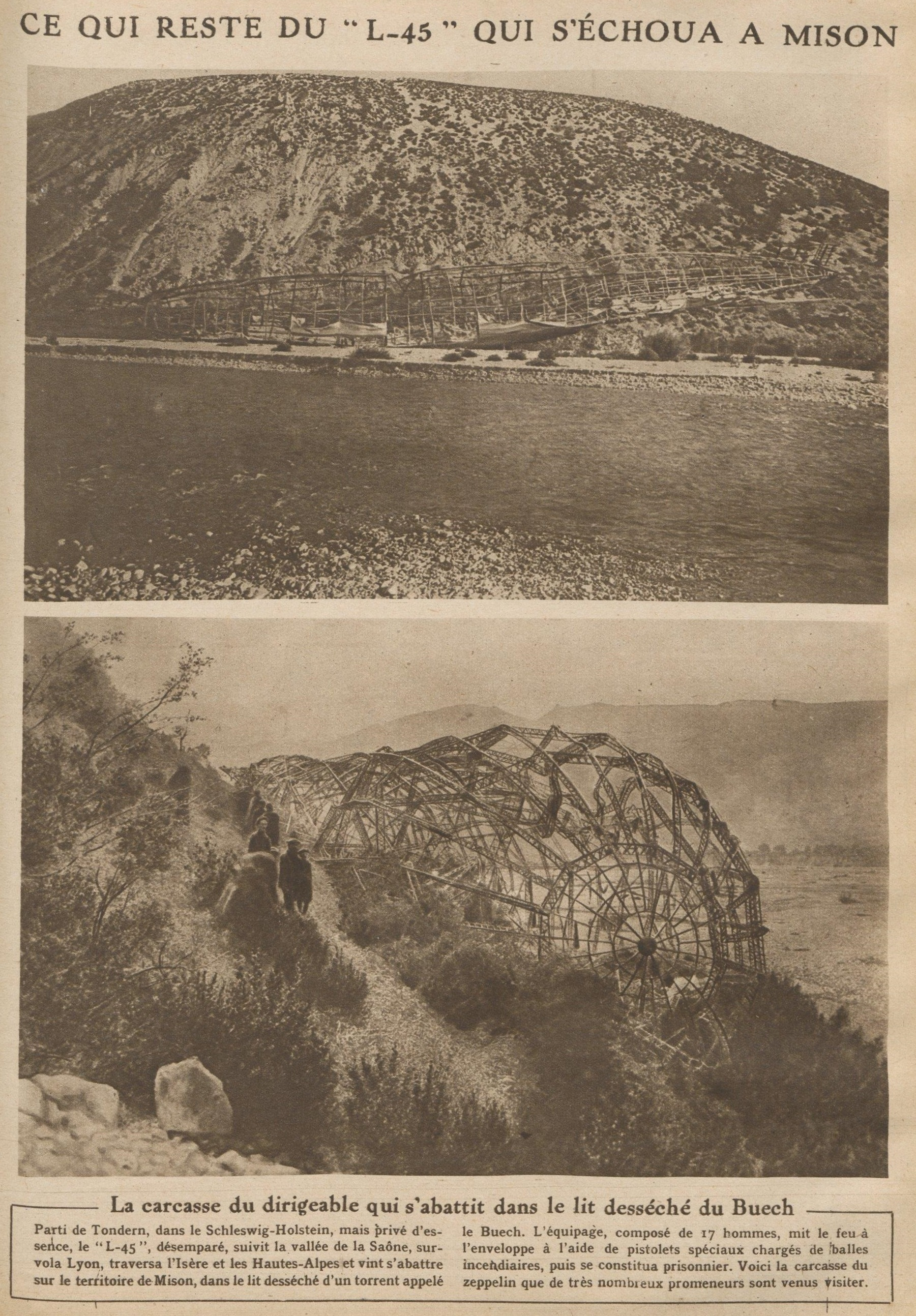
The burnt out wreck of LZ 85

At 10.50am, commander Kölle decided to make an emergency landing on a reclaimed island near Laragne Buech, north of Sisteron in the region of Provence-Alpes-Côte d'Azur in south-eastern France as he knew he could not keep his ship in the air much longer. The commander steered his ship into the dry bed of a river, but the zeppelin bounced up again, losing one of her propellers on impact. The commander ordered the crew to jump from the ship before it crashed on the hillside next to the river, but not all the crew had abandoned LZ 85 before she crashed into the hillside. The ship came to rest on the hill almost undamaged and the commander and remaining crew abandoned LZ 85 and set the ship ablaze with a signal pistol before anyone could stop him, despite the efforts of Madame Dupont, a local farmer's wife. After burning the aircraft, the crew of 17 men along with the first officer and Kölle were taken into custody as prisoners of war.

== Aftermath ==
In the afternoon of 20 October 1917, 16 of the crew-members were taken to Laragne where they were interrogated by local gendarmes. Commander Waldemar Kölle was interrogated by the German department of the French intelligence service on 1 November 1917. The report of the commander's interrogation was later smuggled to Nordholz, where Peter Strasser received it on 25 April 1918. In the report it was revealed that the British Naval Intelligence Division had gotten hold of detailed and updated information on the German naval airships and all their commanders, including on Bockholt's top secret Africa mission. The discovery resulted in 3 people from Tønder and 2 from Nordholz coming under suspicion of spying and later being found guilty and executed by a firing squad. The circumstances are not clear as most archive material has been lost.

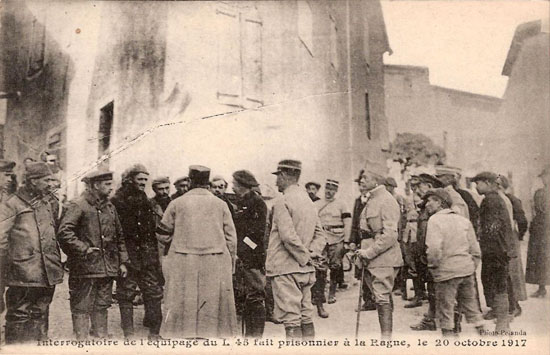
The captured crew of LZ 85

The crew of LZ 85 were held as Prisoners Of War until the end of the war, when they were all released, except Waldemar Kölle, who was accused under Versailles Treaty to have committed war crimes by killing civilians. Kölle remained jailed in Roanne until 1921.

=== The Silent Raid Aftermath ===
The raid was not viewed as a great success as the German navy lost a total of five airships:

- LZ 85 crash-landed in Laragne and her crew of 19 were captured.
- LZ 93 was shot down by anti aircraft fire from French Army artillery over Lunéville resulting in the death of everyone on board.
- LZ 96 force-landed in Bourbonne-les-Bains and was captured undamaged together with her crew.
- LZ 89 Tried to land in Dammartin but ended up tearing off the control car and sending the ship drifting over the Mediterranean where it exploded, killing the 5 remaining crewmen on board.
- LZ 101 crash-landed at the Werra river in Thuringia and was declared a total loss.

== Legacy ==
LZ 85 will always be remembered as the Zeppelin of Laragne to the people of France. The airship dropped a total of 4,700 kg (10,400 lb) of bombs during its three raids and killed an estimated 30 people, as well as damaging many buildings. One of the people killed during LZ 85's last bombardment of London was a girl named Lily, who was the inspiration for Henry Williamson's 1957 novel The Golden Virgin, in which the protagonist Lily is killed in the bombardment. This also inspired Kate Bush in 1993 for the song "Lily."

== Specifications (LZ 85 / Type r zeppelin) ==
Data from Zeppelin : rigid airships, 1893-1940

General characteristics

- Crew: 17-19
- Capacity: 32,400 kg (71,430 lb) typical disposable load
- Length: 198 m (649 ft 7 in)
- Diameter: 23.9 m (78 ft 5 in) maximum
- Fineness ratio: 8.24
- Volume: 55,200 m^{3} (1,950,000 cu ft) in 19 gas cells
- Empty weight: 31,400 kg (69,225 lb)
- Gross weight: 32,908 kg (72,550 lb)
- Fuel capacity: 6,250 kg (13,779 lb)
- Useful lift: 63,800 kg (140,700 lb)
- Powerplant: 5 × Maybach HS Lu 6-cylinder water-cooled in-line piston engines, 180 kW (240 hp) each
- Propellers: 4-bladed Lorenzen fixed-pitch propellers

Performance

- Maximum speed: 103 km/h (64 mph, 56 kn)
- Cruise speed: 81 km/h (50 mph, 44 kn)
- Range: 7,400 km (4,600 mi, 4,000 nmi) at 81 km/h (50 mph; 44 kn)
- Service ceiling: 3,900 m (12,800 ft) static
- Rate of climb: 10 m/s (2,000 ft/min) maximum permitted (r-class)

Armament

- Guns: machine-guns in hull-top positions and gondolas
- Bombs: up to 60 bombs to a total of 5,000 kg (11,023 lb)
