= Zeppelin LZ 78 =

R-class World War I zeppelin

LZ 78 (L 34)
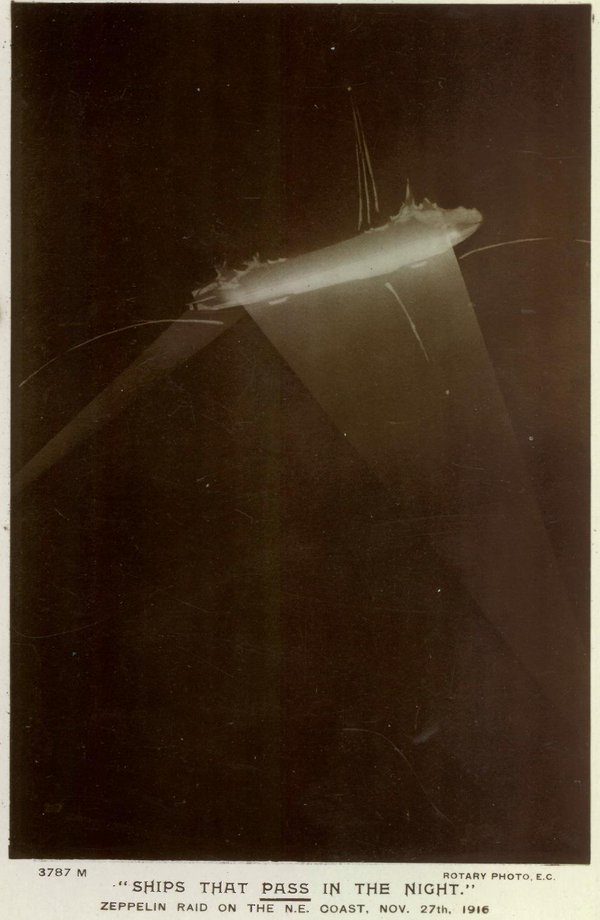
- Imperial German Army Zeppelin LZ 78 (L 34) over Hartlepool

General information
- Type: R-class reconnaissance-bomber rigid airship
- National origin: German Empire
- Manufacturer: Luftschiffbau Zeppelin
- Designer: Ludwig Dürr
- Primary user: Imperial German Army
- Number built: 1

History
- First flight: 22 September 1916
- Retired: Shot down on 27 November 1916

The Imperial German Army Zeppelin LZ 78 (L-34) was a R-class World War I zeppelin.

== Operational history ==
The airship took part in three reconnaissance missions and two attacks on England dropping 3,890 kg (8,580 lb) of bombs. It also took part in the Zeppelin raid involving three other Imperial German Airships: the LZ 72 (L 31), L 32 and Zeppelin LZ 76 (L 33) on the evening of 23 September 1916. Of the four Airships, LZ 78 was the only Zeppelin that returned to base after the raid. Together all four Zepellins succeeded in dropping 3,200 kilograms (7,100 lb) of bombs on London and surrounding counties.

== Last mission ==
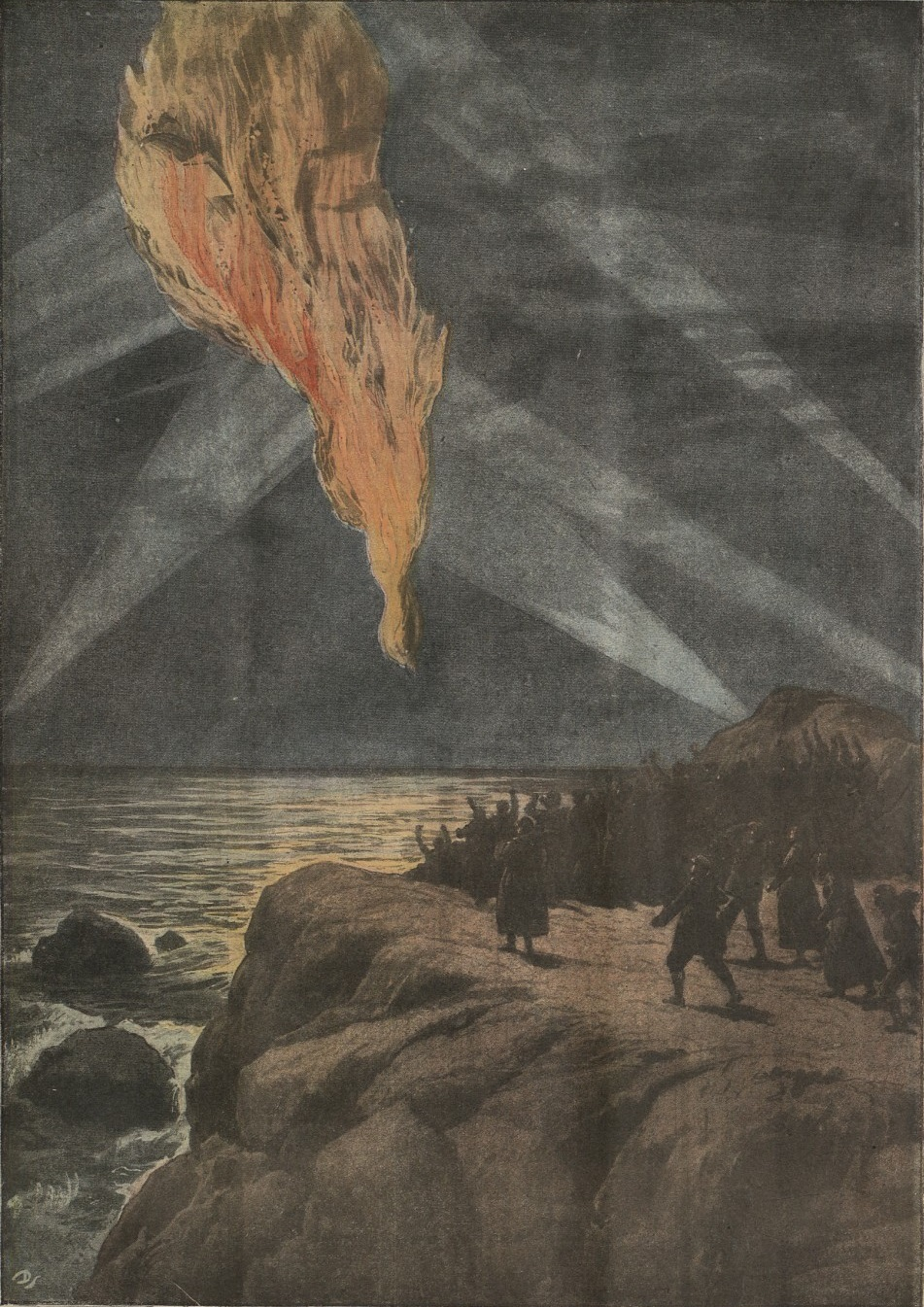
Zeppelin L34 shot down by Ian Pyott just off the coast of Hartlepool in north-east England on the night of 27/28 November 1916.

On 27 November 1916, Zeppelin LZ 78 was intercepted and destroyed by British fighter pilot Second Lieutenant Ian Pyott in Royal Aircraft Factory B.E.2c (Serial no. 2738) off Hartlepool. His bullets ignited the hydrogen, "like a massive fiery torch which lit up the night for miles around, she plunged into the sea." The commander of the Airship was Kapitanleutnant Max Dietrich the uncle of famous actress Marlene Dietrich.

== Specifications (LZ 78 / Type R zeppelin) ==
Data from Zeppelin : rigid airships, 1893–1940

General characteristics

- Crew: 17-19
- Capacity: 32,400 kg (71,430 lb) typical disposable load
- Length: 198 m (649 ft 7 in)
- Diameter: 23.9 m (78 ft 5 in) maximum
- Fineness ratio: 8.24
- Volume: 55,200 m^{3} (1,950,000 cu ft) in 19 gas cells
- Empty weight: 31,400 kg (69,225 lb)
- Gross weight: 32,908 kg (72,550 lb)
- Fuel capacity: 6,250 kg (13,779 lb)
- Useful lift: 63,800 kg (140,700 lb)
- Powerplant: 5 × Maybach HS Lu 6-cylinder water-cooled in-line piston engines, 180 kW (240 hp) each
- Propellers: 4-bladed Lorenzen fixed-pitch propellers

Performance

- Maximum speed: 103 km/h (64 mph, 56 kn)
- Cruise speed: 81 km/h (50 mph, 44 kn)
- Range: 7,400 km (4,600 mi, 4,000 nmi) at 81 km/h (50 mph; 44 kn)
- Service ceiling: 3,900 m (12,800 ft) static
- Rate of climb: 10 m/s (2,000 ft/min) maximum permitted (r-class)

Armament

- Guns: machine-guns in hull-top positions and gondolas
- Bombs: up to 60 bombs to a total of 5,000 kg (11,023 lb)

== See also ==
- List of Zeppelins
