= Laragne-Montéglin =

- Commune
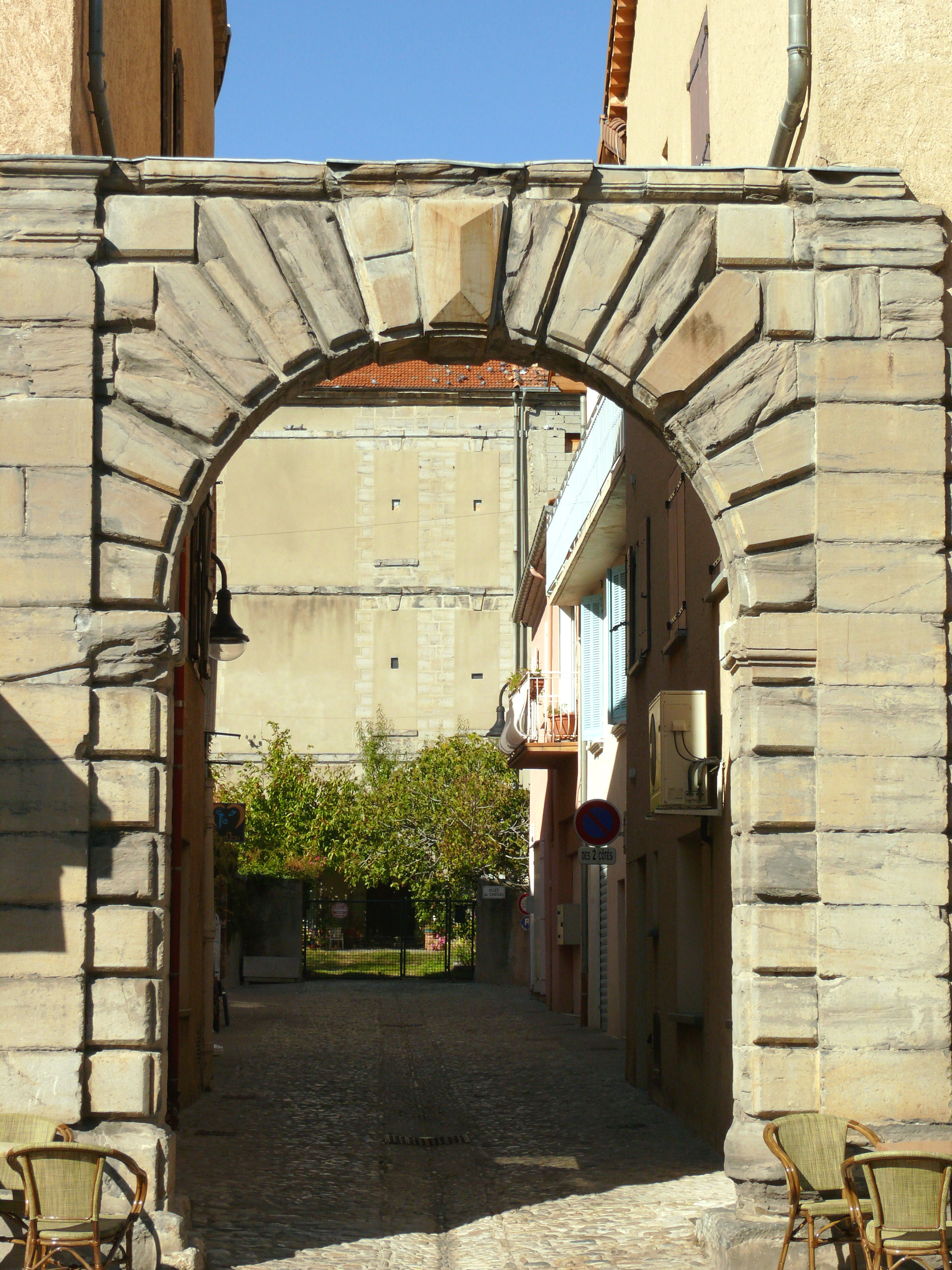
- The entrance portal of the remains of the castle of Laragne

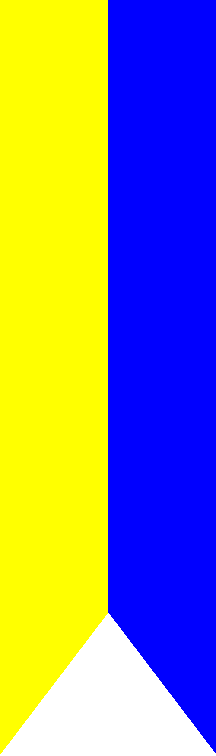
- Flag Coat of arms
- Location of Laragne-Montéglin
- Location within France Location within Provence-Alpes-Côte d'Azur
- Coordinates: 44°18′57″N 5°49′20″E
- Country: France
- Region: Provence-Alpes-Côte d'Azur
- Department: Hautes-Alpes
- Arrondissement: Gap
- Canton: Laragne-Montéglin

Government
  - Mayor (2026–32): Maurice Brun
- Area^{1}: 23.51 km^{2} (9.08 sq mi)
- Elevation: 573 m (1,880 ft)
- Highest elevation: 1,240 m (4,070 ft)
- Lowest elevation: 544 m (1,785 ft)
- Population (2023): 3,549
  - Density: 151.0/km^{2} (391.0/sq mi)
- Time zone: UTC+01:00 (CET)
  - Summer (DST): UTC+02:00 (CEST)
- INSEE/Postal code: 05070 /05300
- ^{1} French Land Register data, which excludes lakes, ponds, glaciers > 1 km^{2} (0.386 sq mi or 247 acres) and river estuaries.

Laragne-Montéglin (French pronunciation: [laʁaɲ mɔ̃teɡlɛ̃]; Occitan: L'Aranha Montaiglin) is a commune in the Hautes-Alpes department in southeastern France.

== Geography ==
=== Climate ===
Laragne-Montéglin has a mediterranean climate (Köppen climate classification Csa). The average annual temperature in Laragne-Montéglin is 11.9 °C (53.4 °F). The average annual rainfall is 815.2 mm (32.09 in) with November as the wettest month. The temperatures are highest on average in July, at around 22.0 °C (71.6 °F), and lowest in January, at around 2.1 °C (35.8 °F). The highest temperature ever recorded in Laragne-Montéglin was 41.1 °C (106.0 °F) on 26 June 2019; the coldest temperature ever recorded was −17.4 °C (0.7 °F) on 18 December 2010.

Climate data for Laragne-Montéglin (1981–2010 averages, extremes 1992−present)
Month	Jan	Feb	Mar	Apr	May	Jun	Jul	Aug	Sep	Oct	Nov	Dec	Year
Record high °C (°F)	20.6 (69.1)	24.3 (75.7)	26.6 (79.9)	30.3 (86.5)	34.1 (93.4)	41.1 (106.0)	38.7 (101.7)	39.6 (103.3)	35.5 (95.9)	29.8 (85.6)	22.1 (71.8)	18.0 (64.4)	41.1 (106.0)
Mean daily maximum °C (°F)	7.3 (45.1)	10.5 (50.9)	15.2 (59.4)	17.8 (64.0)	22.9 (73.2)	27.7 (81.9)	30.4 (86.7)	29.7 (85.5)	24.0 (75.2)	18.9 (66.0)	11.8 (53.2)	7.0 (44.6)	18.6 (65.5)
Daily mean °C (°F)	2.1 (35.8)	4.2 (39.6)	8.1 (46.6)	10.8 (51.4)	15.5 (59.9)	19.6 (67.3)	22.0 (71.6)	21.5 (70.7)	16.8 (62.2)	12.5 (54.5)	6.5 (43.7)	2.4 (36.3)	11.9 (53.4)
Mean daily minimum °C (°F)	−3.0 (26.6)	−2.1 (28.2)	1.0 (33.8)	3.9 (39.0)	8.2 (46.8)	11.5 (52.7)	13.6 (56.5)	13.3 (55.9)	9.5 (49.1)	6.2 (43.2)	1.2 (34.2)	−2.1 (28.2)	5.1 (41.2)
Record low °C (°F)	−15.7 (3.7)	−16.1 (3.0)	−12.6 (9.3)	−5.5 (22.1)	−0.8 (30.6)	2.7 (36.9)	6.0 (42.8)	5.6 (42.1)	−0.7 (30.7)	−4.5 (23.9)	−11.7 (10.9)	−17.4 (0.7)	−17.4 (0.7)
Average precipitation mm (inches)	68.6 (2.70)	40.6 (1.60)	36.0 (1.42)	79.7 (3.14)	73.5 (2.89)	53.0 (2.09)	37.4 (1.47)	50.4 (1.98)	98.1 (3.86)	99.6 (3.92)	107.0 (4.21)	71.3 (2.81)	815.2 (32.09)
Average precipitation days (≥ 1.0 mm)	6.7	4.8	5.3	8.3	8.6	5.5	4.4	5.6	6.6	7.6	8.3	7.7	79.5
Source: Meteociel

== Population ==
Historical population
Year	Pop.	±% p.a.
1968	3,579	—
1975	3,847	+1.04%
1982	3,647	−0.76%
1990	3,371	−0.98%
1999	3,296	−0.25%
2007	3,508	+0.78%
2012	3,579	+0.40%
2017	3,511	−0.38%
2023	3,549	+0.18%
Source: INSEE

== See also ==
- Communes of the Hautes-Alpes department
