= Zeppelin =

Rigid airship type

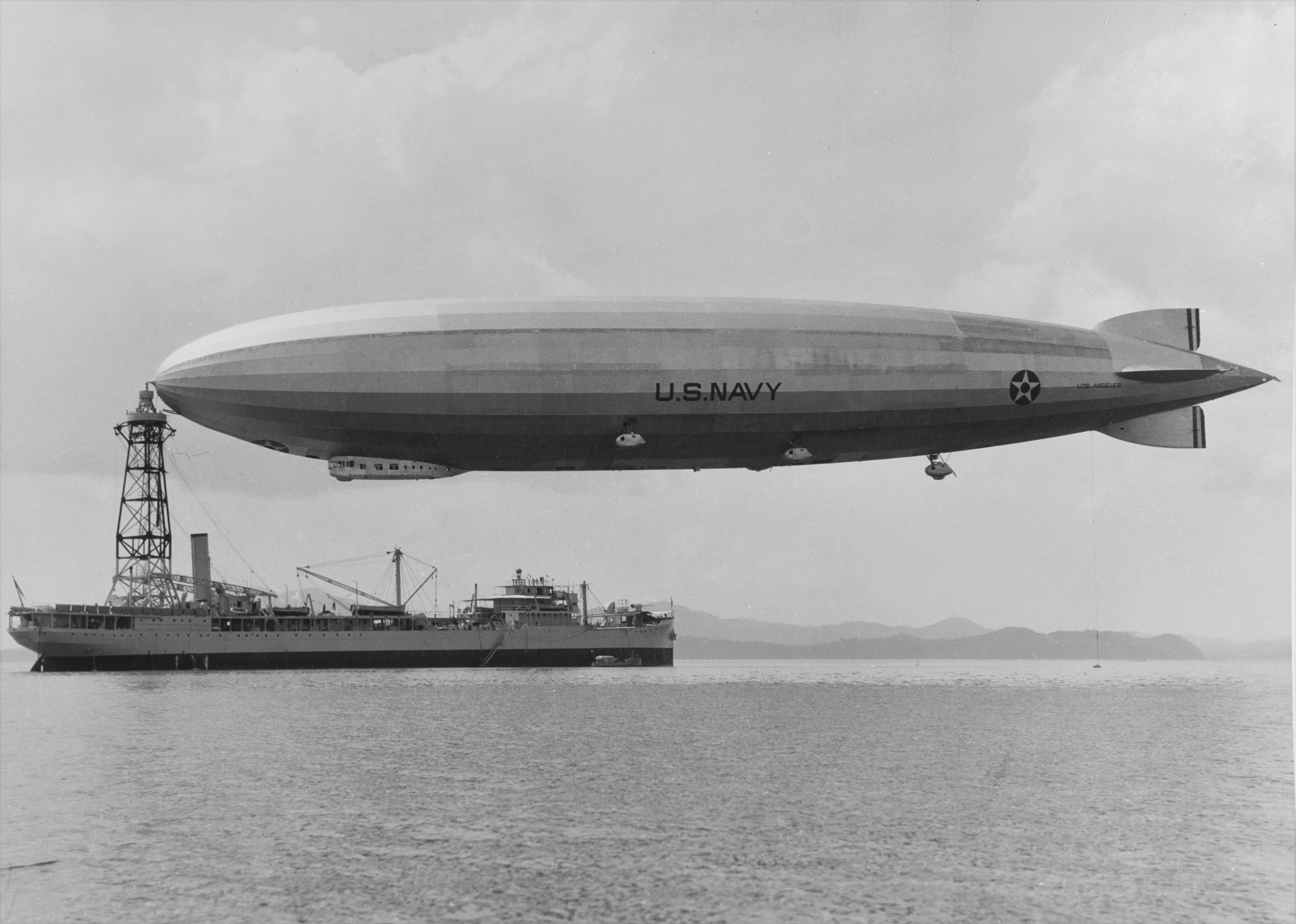
The USS Los Angeles, a United States Navy airship built in Germany by the Luftschiffbau Zeppelin (Zeppelin Airship Company), 1931

A Zeppelin is a type of rigid airship named after the German inventor Ferdinand von Zeppelin (German pronunciation: [ˈt͡sɛpəliːn]) who pioneered rigid airship development at the beginning of the 20th century. Zeppelin's notions were first formulated in 1874 and developed in detail in 1893. They were patented in Germany in 1895 and in the United States in 1899. After the outstanding success of the Zeppelin design, the word zeppelin came to be commonly used to refer to all forms of rigid airships. Zeppelins were first flown commercially in 1910 by Deutsche Luftschiffahrts-AG (DELAG), the world's first airline in revenue service. By mid-1914, DELAG had carried over 10,000 fare-paying passengers on over 1,500 flights. During World War I, the German military made extensive use of Zeppelins as bombers and as scouts. Numerous bombing raids on Britain resulted in over 500 deaths.

The defeat of Germany in 1918 temporarily slowed the airship business. Although DELAG established a scheduled daily service between Berlin, Munich, and Friedrichshafen in 1919, the airships built for that service eventually had to be surrendered under the terms of the Treaty of Versailles, which also prohibited Germany from building large airships. An exception was made to allow the construction of one airship for the United States Navy, the order for which saved the company from extinction.

In 1926, the restrictions on airship construction were lifted and, with the aid of donations from the public, work began on the construction of LZ 127 Graf Zeppelin. That revived the company's fortunes and, during the 1930s, the airships Graf Zeppelin, and the even larger LZ 129 Hindenburg operated regular transatlantic flights from Germany to North America and Brazil. The spire of the Empire State Building was originally designed to serve as a mooring mast for Zeppelins and other airships, although it was found that high winds made that impossible and the plan was abandoned. The Hindenburg disaster in 1937, along with political and economic developments in Germany in the lead-up to World War II, hastened the demise of airships.

== Principal characteristics ==
The pink ovals depict hydrogen cells inside the LZ 127. The magenta elements are Blaugas cells. The full-resolution picture labels more internals.

The principal feature of the Zeppelin's design was a fabric-covered, rigid metal framework of transverse rings and longitudinal girders enclosing many individual gasbags or cells, which were filled with flammable hydrogen (H₂) – the only practical lifting gas available to German engineers at the time. This structure allowed the craft to be much larger than non-rigid airships, which relied on the inflation of a single pressure envelope to maintain their shape. Most Zeppelins used duralumin for the framework – a combination of aluminium, copper, and two or three other metals, the exact composition of which was kept secret for years. In early models, the gasbags were made of rubberized cotton, but most later craft used goldbeater's skin derived from cattle gut.

The first Zeppelins had long cylindrical hulls with tapered ends and complex multi-plane fins. During World War I, following the lead of the rival firm Schütte-Lanz Luftschiffbau, almost all later airships changed to the more familiar streamlined shape with cruciform tail fins.

Zeppelins were propelled by several internal combustion engines, mounted in gondolas or engine cars attached outside the structural framework. Some of these could provide reverse thrust for manoeuvring while mooring.

Early models had a fairly small externally-mounted gondola for passengers and crew beneath the frame. This space was never heated, because fire outside of the kitchen was considered too risky, and during trips across the North Atlantic or Siberia, passengers were forced to bundle in blankets and furs to keep warm and were often miserably cold.

By the time of the Hindenburg, several important changes had made traveling much more comfortable: the passenger space had been relocated to the interior of the framework, passenger rooms were insulated from the exterior by the dining area, and forced warm air could be circulated from the water that cooled the forward engines. The new design did prevent passengers from enjoying the views from the windows of their berths, which had been a major attraction on the Graf Zeppelin. On both the older and newer vessels, the external viewing windows were often open during flight. The flight altitude was so low that no pressurization of the cabins was necessary. The Hindenburg did maintain a pressurized air-locked smoking room: no flame was allowed, but a single electric lighter was provided, which could not be removed from the room.

Access to Zeppelins was achieved in several ways. The Graf Zeppelin's gondola was accessed while the vessel was on the ground, via gangways. The Hindenburg also had passenger gangways leading from the ground directly into its hull, which could be withdrawn entirely, ground access to the gondola, and an exterior access hatch via its electrical room; the latter was intended for crew use only.

On some long-distance zeppelins, engines were powered by a special Blau gas produced by the Zeppelin facility in Friedrichshafen. The combustible Blau gas was formulated to make its weight near that of air, so that its storage and consumption had little effect on the Zeppelin's buoyancy. Blau gas was used on the first Zeppelin voyage to the United States, starting in 1929.

== History ==
=== Early designs ===
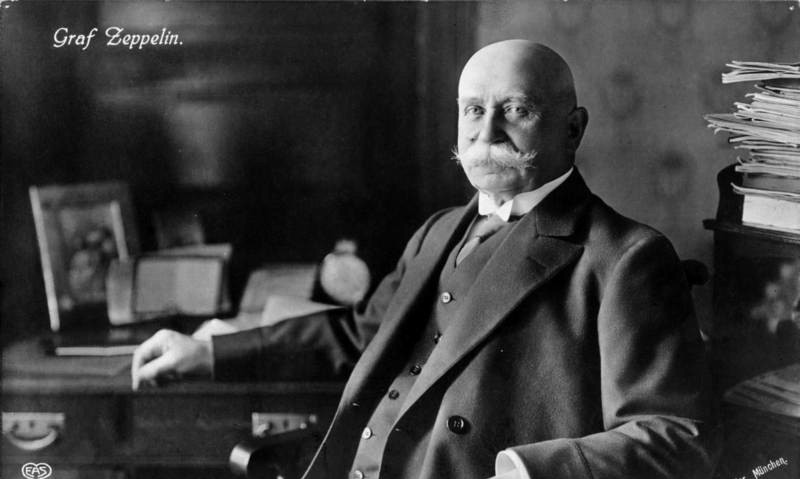
Ferdinand von Zeppelin

Count Ferdinand von Zeppelin's interest in airship development began in 1874, when he was inspired by a lecture given by Heinrich von Stephan on the subject of "World Postal Services and Air Travel" to outline the basic principle of his later craft in a diary entry dated 25 March 1874. It describes a large rigidly framed outer envelope containing several separate gasbags. He had previously encountered Union Army balloons in 1863 when he visited the United States as a military observer during the American Civil War.

Count Zeppelin began to seriously pursue his project after his early retirement from the army in 1890 at the age of 52. Convinced of the potential importance of aviation, he started working on various designs in 1891 and had completed detailed designs by 1893. An official committee reviewed his plans in 1894, and he received a patent, granted on 31 August 1895, with Theodor Kober producing the technical drawings.

Zeppelin's patent described a Lenkbares Luftfahrzeug mit mehreren hintereinander angeordneten Tragkörpern ("Steerable aircraft with several carrier bodies arranged one behind another"), an airship consisting of flexibly articulated rigid sections. The front section, containing the crew and engines, was 117.35 m (385.0 ft) long with a gas capacity of 9,514 m^{3} (336,000 ft^{3}). The middle section was 16 m (52 ft 6 in) long with an intended useful load of 599 kg (1,321 lb) and the rear section 39.93 m (131.0 ft) long with an intended load of 1,996 kg (4,400 lb).

Count Zeppelin's attempts to secure government funding for his project proved unsuccessful, but a lecture given to the Union of German Engineers gained their support. Zeppelin also sought support from the industrialist Carl Berg, then engaged in construction work on the second airship design of David Schwarz. Berg was under contract not to supply aluminium to any other airship manufacturer, and subsequently made a payment to Schwarz's widow as compensation for breaking this agreement. Schwarz's design differed fundamentally from Zeppelin's, crucially lacking the use of separate gasbags inside a rigid envelope.

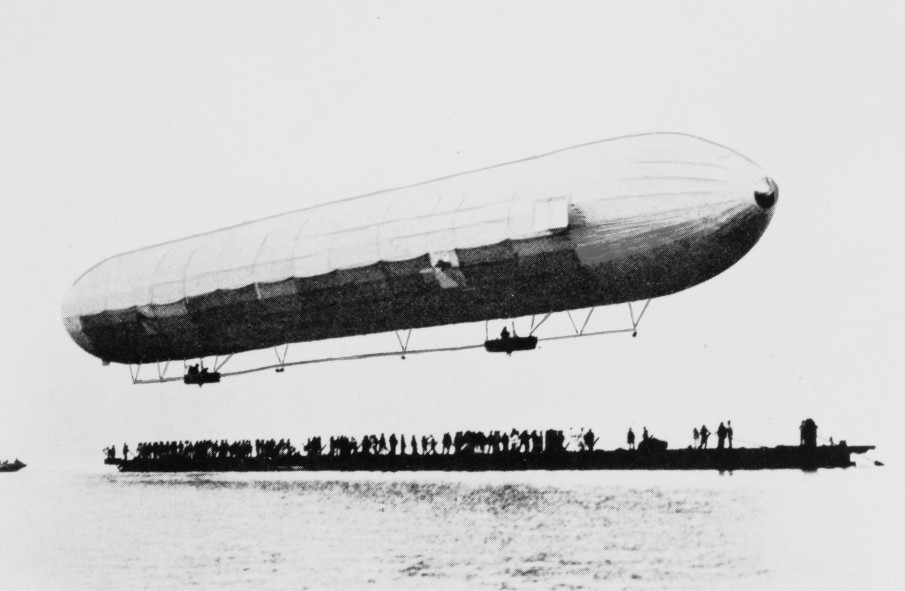
The first flight of LZ 1 over Lake Constance, the Bodensee, 1900

In 1898, Count Zeppelin founded the Gesellschaft zur Förderung der Luftschiffahrt ("Society for the Promotion of Airship Flight"), personally contributing more than half of its 800,000-mark share capital — a sum broadly equivalent to €6.65 million in early 2010s terms, based on historical gold value and purchasing power estimates. Responsibility for the detailed design was given to Kober, whose place was later taken by Ludwig Dürr, and construction of the first airship began in 1899 in a floating assembly-hall or hangar in the Bay of Manzell near Friedrichshafen on Lake Constance (the Bodensee). The intention behind the floating hall was to facilitate the difficult task of bringing the airship out of the hall, as it could easily be aligned with the wind. The LZ 1 (LZ for Luftschiff Zeppelin, or "Zeppelin Airship") was 128 metres (420 ft) long with a hydrogen capacity of 11,000 m^{3} (400,000 ft^{3}), was driven by two 15 horsepower (11 kW) Daimler engines each driving a pair of propellers mounted either side of the envelope via bevel gears and a driveshaft, and was controlled in pitch by moving a weight between its two nacelles.

The first flight took place over Lake Constance on 2 July 1900. Damaged during landing, it was repaired and modified and proved its potential in two subsequent flights made on 17 and 24 October 1900, bettering the 6 m/s (21.6 km/h (13.4 mph)) velocity attained by the French airship La France. Despite this performance, the shareholders declined to invest more money, and so the company was liquidated, with Count von Zeppelin purchasing the ship and equipment. The Count wished to continue experimenting, but he eventually dismantled the ship in 1901.

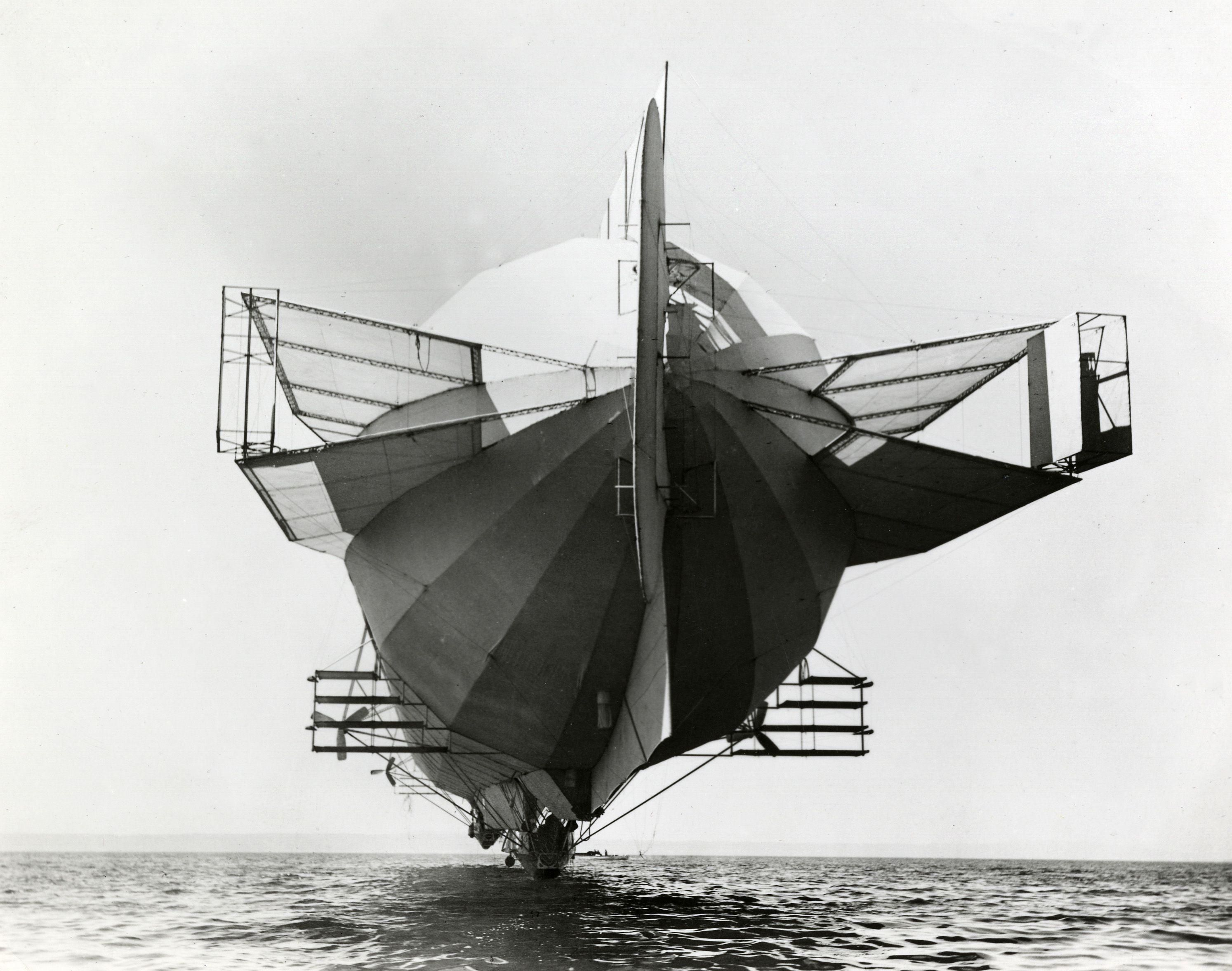
Zeppelin LZ 4 with its multiple stabilizers, 1908

Donations, the profits of a special lottery, some public funding, a mortgage of Count von Zeppelin's wife's estate, and a 100,000 mark contribution by Count von Zeppelin himself allowed the construction of LZ 2, which made only a single flight on 17 January 1906. After both engines failed, it made a forced landing in the Allgäu mountains, where a storm subsequently damaged the anchored ship beyond repair.

Incorporating all the usable parts of LZ 2, its successor LZ 3 became the first truly successful Zeppelin. This renewed the interest of the German military, but a condition of purchase of an airship was a 24-hour endurance trial. This was beyond the capabilities of LZ 3, leading Zeppelin to construct his fourth design, the LZ 4, first flown on 20 June 1908. On 1 July, it was flown over Switzerland to Zürich and then back to Lake Constance, covering 386 km (240 mi) and reaching an altitude of 795 m (2,608 ft). An attempt to complete the 24-hour trial flight ended when LZ 4 had to make a landing at Echterdingen near Stuttgart because of mechanical problems. During the stop, a storm tore the airship away from its moorings on the afternoon of 5 August 1908. It crashed into a tree, caught fire, and quickly burned out. No one was seriously injured.

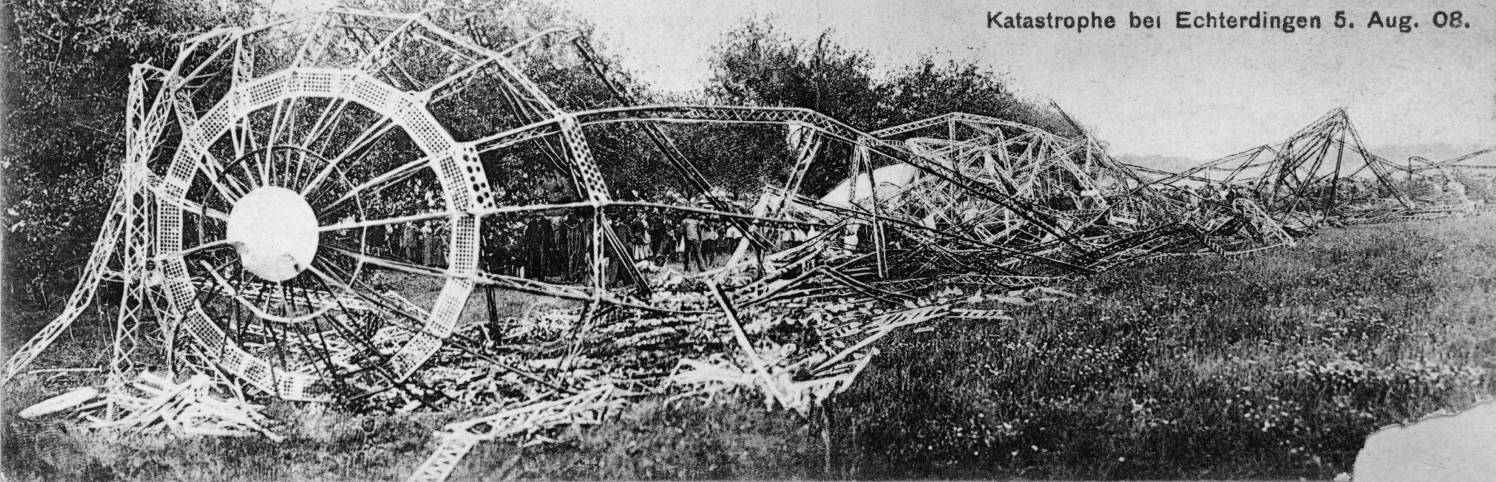
Wreckage of LZ 4

This accident would have finished Zeppelin's experiments, but his flights had generated huge public interest and a sense of national pride regarding his work, and spontaneous donations from the public began pouring in, eventually totalling over six million marks. This enabled the Count to found the Luftschiffbau Zeppelin GmbH (Airship Construction Zeppelin Ltd.) and the Zeppelin Foundation.

=== Before World War I ===
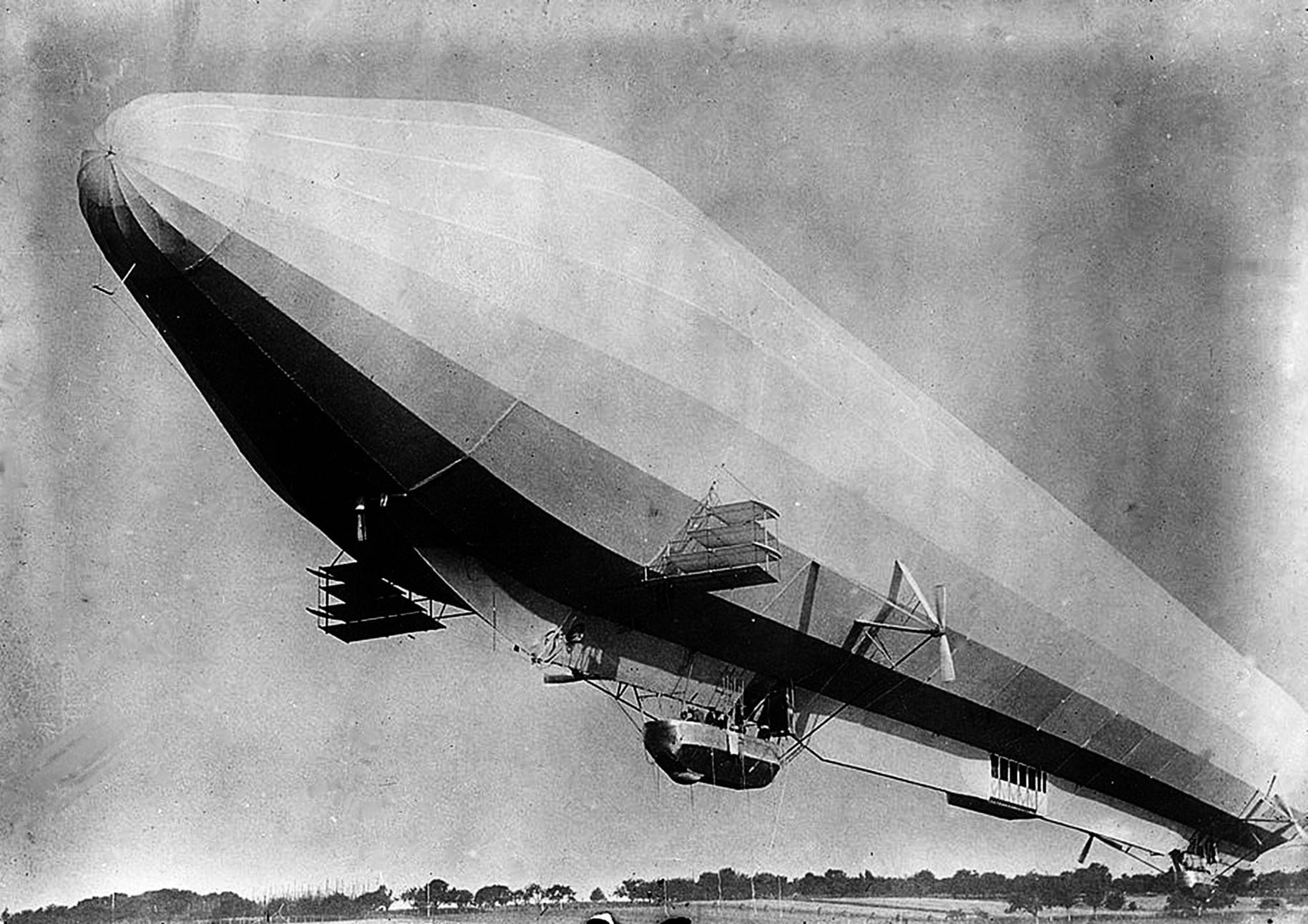
LZ 7 Deutschland

Before World War I (1914–1918), the Zeppelin company manufactured 21 more airships. The Imperial German Army bought LZ 3 and LZ 5 (a sister-ship to LZ 4, which was completed in May 1909) and designated them Z I and Z II respectively. Z II was wrecked in a gale in April 1910, while Z I flew until 1913, when it was decommissioned and replaced by LZ 15, designated ersatz Z I. First flown on 16 January 1913, it was wrecked on 19 March.

In April 1913, its newly built sister-ship LZ 15 (Z IV) accidentally intruded into French airspace owing to a navigational error caused by high winds and poor visibility. The commander judged it proper to land the airship to demonstrate that the incursion was accidental, and brought the ship down on the military parade-ground at Lunéville. The airship remained on the ground until the following day, permitting a detailed examination by French airship experts.

In 1909, Count Zeppelin founded the world's first airline, the Deutsche Luftschiffahrts-Aktiengesellschaft (German Airship Travel Corporation), generally known as DELAG to promote his airships, initially using LZ 6, which he had hoped to sell to the German Army. Notable aviation figures like Orville Wright offered critical perspectives on the Zeppelin; in a September 1909 New York Times interview, Wright compared airships to steam engines nearing their developmental peak, while seeing airplanes as akin to gas engines with untapped innovation potential. The airships did not provide a scheduled service between cities, but generally operated pleasure cruises, carrying twenty passengers. The airships were given names in addition to their production numbers. LZ 6 first flew on 25 August 1909 and was accidentally destroyed in Baden-Oos on 14 September 1910 by a fire in its hangar.

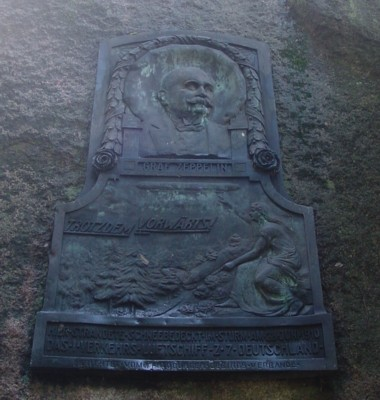
A monument near Bad Iburg commemorating the 1910 LZ 7 crash

The second DELAG airship, LZ 7 Deutschland, made its maiden voyage on 19 June 1910. On 28 June, it set off on a voyage to publicise Zeppelins, carrying 19 journalists as passengers. A combination of adverse weather and engine failure brought it down at Mount Limberg near Bad Iburg in Lower Saxony, its hull getting stuck in trees. All passengers and crew were unhurt, except for one crew member who broke his leg when he jumped from the craft.

It was replaced by LZ 8 Deutschland II, which also had a short career, first flying on 30 March 1911 and becoming damaged beyond repair when caught by a strong cross-wind while being walked out of its shed on 16 May. The company's fortunes changed with the next ship, LZ 10 Schwaben, which first flew on 26 June 1911 and carried 1,553 passengers in 218 flights before catching fire after a gust tore it from its mooring near Düsseldorf. Other DELAG ships included LZ 11 Viktoria Luise (1912), LZ 13 Hansa (1912) and LZ 17 Sachsen (1913). By the outbreak of World War I in August 1914, 1588 flights had carried 10,197 fare-paying passengers.

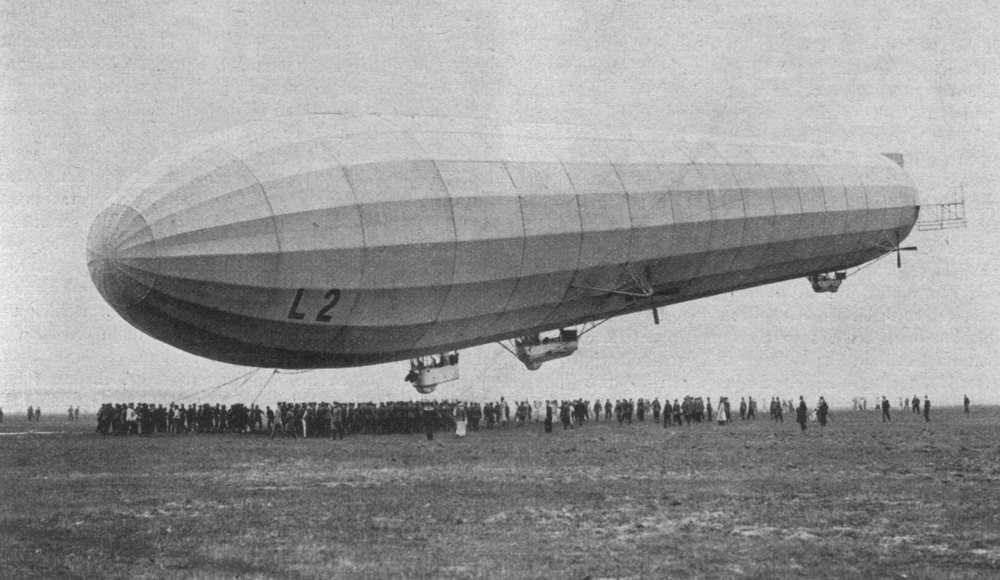
LZ 18 (L 2)

On 24 April 1912, the Imperial German Navy ordered its first Zeppelin—an enlarged version of the airships operated by DELAG—which received the naval designation Z 1 and entered Navy service in October 1912. On 18 January 1913, Admiral Alfred von Tirpitz, Secretary of State of the German Imperial Naval Office, obtained the agreement of Kaiser Wilhelm II to a five-year program of expansion of German naval-airship strength, involving the building of two airship bases and constructing a fleet of ten airships. The first airship of the program, L 2, was ordered on 30 January. L 1 was lost on 9 September near Heligoland when caught in a storm while taking part in an exercise with the German fleet. 14 crew members drowned, the first fatalities in a Zeppelin accident.

Less than six weeks later, on 17 October, LZ 18 (L 2) caught fire during its acceptance trials, killing the entire crew. These accidents deprived the Navy of most of its experienced personnel: the head of the Admiralty Air Department was killed in the L 1 and his successor died in the L 2. The Navy was left with three partially trained crews. The next Navy zeppelin, the M class L 3, did not enter service until May 1914: in the meantime, Sachsen was hired from DELAG as a training ship.

By the outbreak of war in August 1914, Zeppelin had started constructing the first M class airships, which had a length of 158 m (518 ft), with a volume of 22,500 cubic metres (794,500 ft^{3}) and a useful load of 9,100 kilograms (20,100 lb). Their three Maybach C-X engines produced 470 kilowatts (630 hp) each, and they could reach speeds of up to 84 kilometres per hour (52 mph).

=== During World War I ===
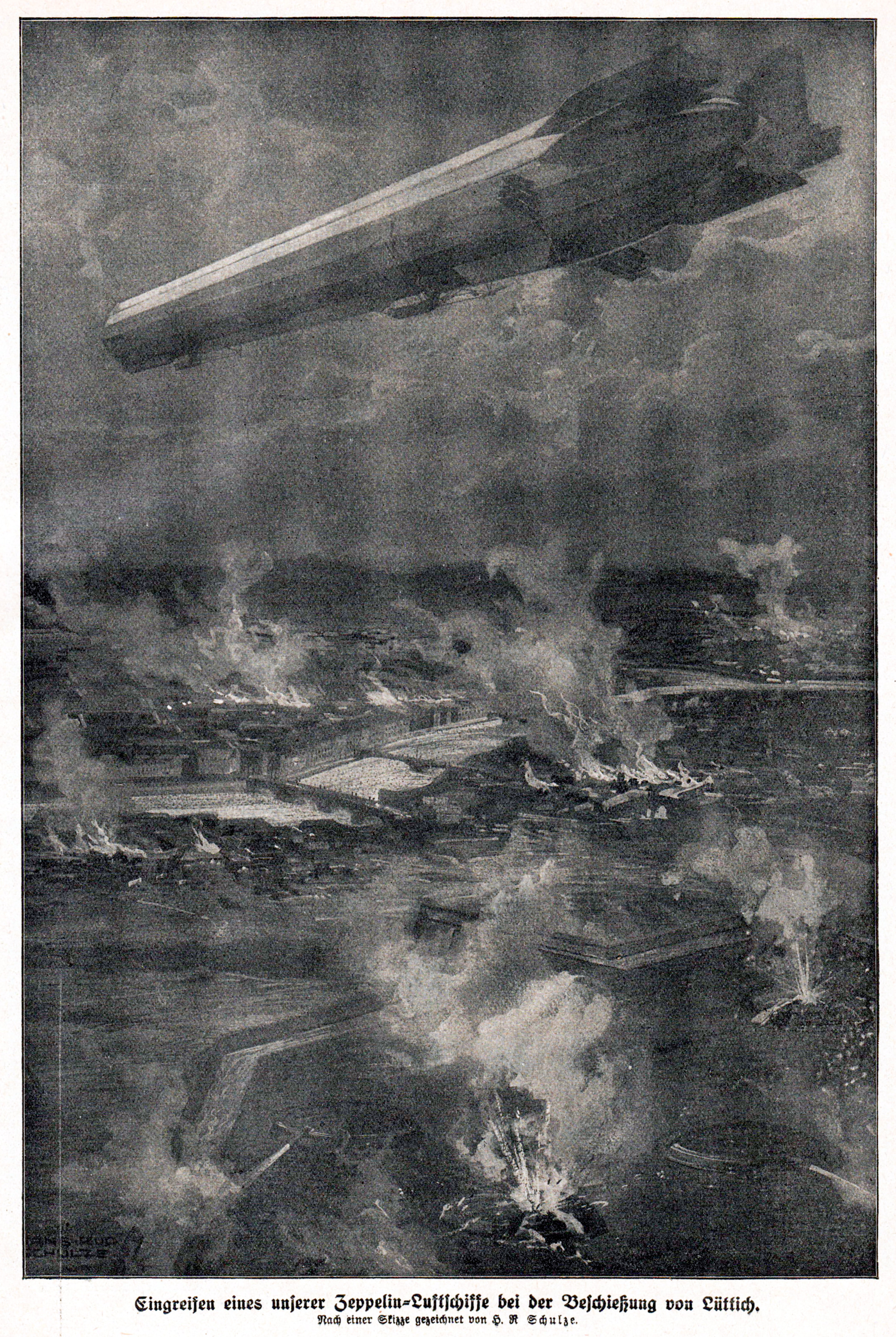
A German zeppelin bombs Liège in WWI

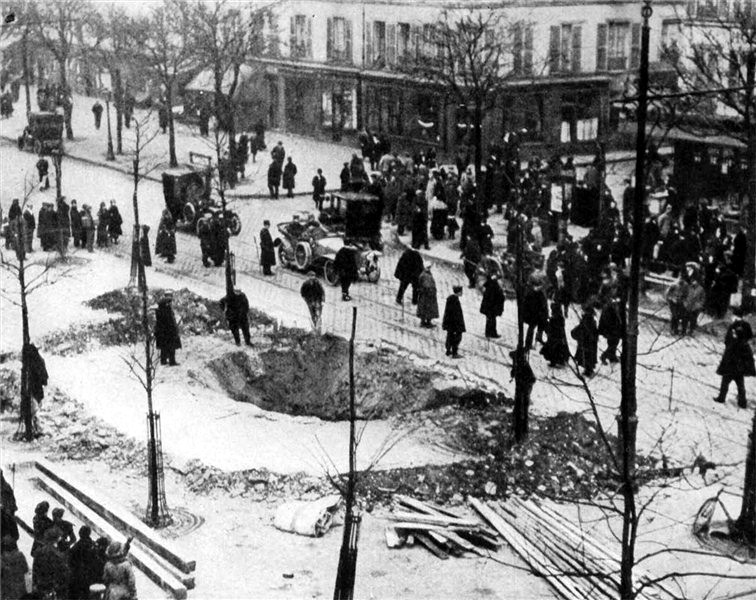
A crater from a Zeppelin bomb in Paris, 1916

During World War I, Germany’s airships were operated separately by the Army and the Navy. At the war’s outset, the Army assumed control of the three remaining DELAG airships, having already decommissioned three older Zeppelins, including Z I. Throughout the war, the Navy primarily used its Zeppelins for reconnaissance missions.

Although Zeppelin bombing raids, especially those aimed at London, captivated the German public’s imagination, they had limited material success. Nevertheless, these raids—along with later bombing raids by airplanes—led to the diversion of men and resources from the Western Front. Additionally, the fear of these attacks impacted industrial production to some extent.

Early offensive operations by Army airships quickly revealed their extreme vulnerability to ground fire when flown at low altitudes, leading to the loss of several airships. Since no dedicated bombs had been developed at the time, these early raids dropped artillery shells instead.

- On 5 August 1914, the airship Z VI bombed Liège. Due to cloud cover, it had to fly at a relatively low altitude, making it susceptible to small-arms fire; the damage led to a forced landing near Bonn, where the airship was destroyed. Thirteen bombs were dropped during the raid, resulting in the deaths of nine civilians.
- On 21 August, airships Z VII and Z VIII were damaged by ground fire while supporting German Army operations in Alsace, with Z VIII ultimately lost. During the night of 24-25 August, Z IX bombed Antwerp, striking near the royal palace and killing five people. Less effective raids followed on the nights of 1-2 September and 7 October. However, on 8 October, Z IX was destroyed in its hangar at Düsseldorf by Flight Lieutenant Reginald Marix of the Royal Naval Air Service (RNAS). The RNAS had previously bombed Zeppelin bases in Cologne on 22 September 1914.
- On the Eastern Front, airship Z V was brought down by ground fire on 28 August during the Battle of Tannenberg, with most of its crew captured. Z IV bombed Warsaw on 24 September and was also used to support German Army operations in East Prussia. By the end of 1914, the Army’s airship fleet had been reduced to four.

On 20 March 1915, temporarily forbidden from bombing London by the Kaiser, Z X (LZ 29), LZ 35 and the Schütte-Lanz airship SL 2 set off to bomb Paris: SL 2 was damaged by artillery fire while crossing the front and turned back but the two Zeppelins reached Paris and dropped 1,800 kg (4,000 lb) of bombs, killing only one and wounding eight. On the return journey, Z X was damaged by anti-aircraft fire and was damaged beyond repair in the resulting forced landing. Three weeks later LZ 35 suffered a similar fate after bombing Poperinghe.

Paris mounted a more effective defense against zeppelin raids than London. Zeppelins attacking Paris had to first fly over the system of forts between the front and the city, from which they were subjected to anti-aircraft fire with reduced risk of collateral damage. The French also maintained a continuous patrol of two fighters over Paris at an altitude from which they could promptly attack arriving zeppelins, avoiding the delay required to reach the zeppelin altitude. Two further missions were flown against Paris in January 1916: on 29 January, LZ 79 killed 23 and injured another 30 but was so severely damaged by anti-aircraft fire that it crashed during the return journey. A second mission by LZ 77 the following night, bombed the suburbs of Asnières and Versailles, with little effect.

Airship operations in the Balkans started in the autumn of 1915, and an airship base was constructed at Szentandras. In November 1915, LZ 81 was used to fly diplomats to Sofia for negotiations with the Bulgarian government. This base was also used by LZ 85 to conduct two raids on Salonika in early 1916: a third raid on 4 May ended with it being brought down by anti-aircraft fire. The crew survived but were taken prisoner.

When Romania entered the war in August 1916, LZ 101 was transferred to Yambol and bombed Bucharest on 28 August, 4 September, and 25 September. LZ 86 transferred to Szentandras and made a single attack on the Ploiești oil fields on 4 September but was wrecked on attempting to land after the mission. Its replacement, LZ 86, was damaged by anti-aircraft fire during its second attack on Bucharest on 26 September and was damaged beyond repair in the resulting forced landing, and was replaced by LZ 97.

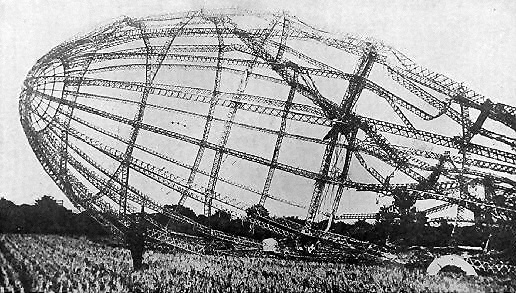
Wreckage of Zeppelin L31 shot down over England 23 September 1916

At the instigation of the Kaiser, a plan was made to bomb Saint Petersburg in December 1916. Two Navy zeppelins were transferred to Wainoden on the Courland Peninsula. A preliminary attempt to bomb Reval on 28 December ended in failure caused by operating problems due to the extreme cold, and one of the airships was destroyed in a forced landing at Seerappen. The plan was subsequently abandoned.

In 1917, the German High Command attempted to use a Zeppelin to deliver supplies to Lettow-Vorbeck's forces in German East Africa. L 57, a specially lengthened craft, was to have flown the mission but was destroyed shortly after completion. A Zeppelin then under construction, L 59, was then modified for the mission: it set off from Yambol on 21 November 1917 and nearly reached its destination, but was ordered to return by radio. Its journey covered 6,400 km (4,000 mi) and lasted 95 hours.

It was then used for reconnaissance and bombing missions in the eastern Mediterranean. It flew one bombing mission against Naples on 10–11 March 1918. A planned attack on Suez was turned back by high winds. On 7 April 1918, it was on a mission to bomb the British naval base at Malta when it caught fire over the Straits of Otranto, with the loss of all its crew.

On 5 January 1918, a fire at Ahlhorn destroyed four of the specialised double sheds along with four Zeppelins and one Schütte-Lanz. In July 1918, the Tondern raid conducted by the RAF and Royal Navy destroyed two Zeppelins in their sheds.

==== 1914–1918 naval patrols ====
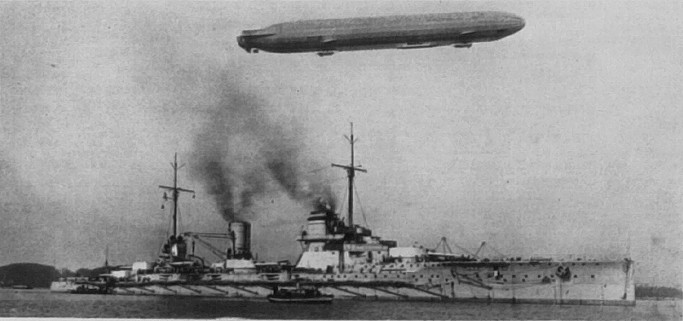
A Zeppelin flying over SMS Seydlitz

The main use of the airship was in reconnaissance over the North Sea and the Baltic, and the majority of airships manufactured were used by the Navy. Patrolling had priority over any other airship activity. During the war, almost 1,000 missions were flown over the North Sea alone, compared with about 50 strategic bombing raids. The German Navy had some 15 Zeppelins in commission by the end of 1915 and was able to have two or more patrolling continuously at any one time. Their operations were limited by weather conditions.

On 17 February 1915, Zeppelins L 3 and L 4 were lost due to a combination of engine failure, icing, and high winds. L 3 crash-landed on the Danish island of Fanø without loss of life. L 4 made an emergency landing at Børsmose Beach on the Jutland mainland, damaging its forward gondola. Eleven crew escaped, but the airship reascended unintentionally, carrying four mechanics out to sea. All four were presumed drowned.

At this stage in the war, there was no clear doctrine for the use of Naval airships. A single large Zeppelin, L 5, played an unimportant part in the Battle of the Dogger Bank on 24 January 1915. L 5 was carrying out a routine patrol when it picked up Admiral Hipper's radio signal announcing that he was engaged with the British battle cruiser squadron. Heading towards the German fleet's position, the Zeppelin was forced to climb above the cloud cover by fire from the British fleet: its commander then decided that it was his duty to cover the retreating German fleet rather than observe British movements.

In 1915, patrols were only carried out on 124 days, and in other years the total was considerably less. They prevented British ships from approaching Germany, spotted when and where the British were laying mines, and later aided in the destruction of those mines. Zeppelins would sometimes land on the sea next to a minesweeper, bring aboard an officer, and show him the mines' locations.

In 1917, the Royal Navy began to take effective countermeasures against airship patrols over the North Sea. In April, the first Curtiss H.12 Large America long-range flying boats were delivered to RNAS Felixstowe, and in July 1917, the aircraft carrier HMS Furious entered service and launching platforms for aeroplanes were fitted to the forward turrets of some light cruisers. On 14 May, L 22 was shot down near Terschelling Bank by an H.12 flown by Lt. Galpin and Sub-Lt. Leckie, which had been alerted following the interception of its radio traffic. Two abortive interceptions were made by Galpin and Leckie on 24 May and 5 June. On 14 June, L 43 was brought down by an H.12 flown by Sub Lts. Hobbs and Dickie. On the same day, Galpin and Leckie intercepted and attacked L 46. The Germans had believed that the previous unsuccessful attacks had been made by an aircraft operating from one of the Royal Navy's seaplane carriers; now, realising that there was a new threat, Strasser ordered airships patrolling in the Terschilling area to maintain an altitude of at least 4,000 m (13,000 ft), considerably reducing their effectiveness. On 21 August, L 23, patrolling off the Danish coast, was spotted by the British 3rd Light Cruiser squadron, which was in the area. HMS Yarmouth launched its Sopwith Pup, and Sub-Lt. B. A. Smart succeeded in shooting the Zeppelin down in flames. The cause of the airship's loss was not discovered by the Germans, who believed the Zeppelin had been brought down by anti-aircraft fire from ships.

==== Bombing campaign against Britain ====
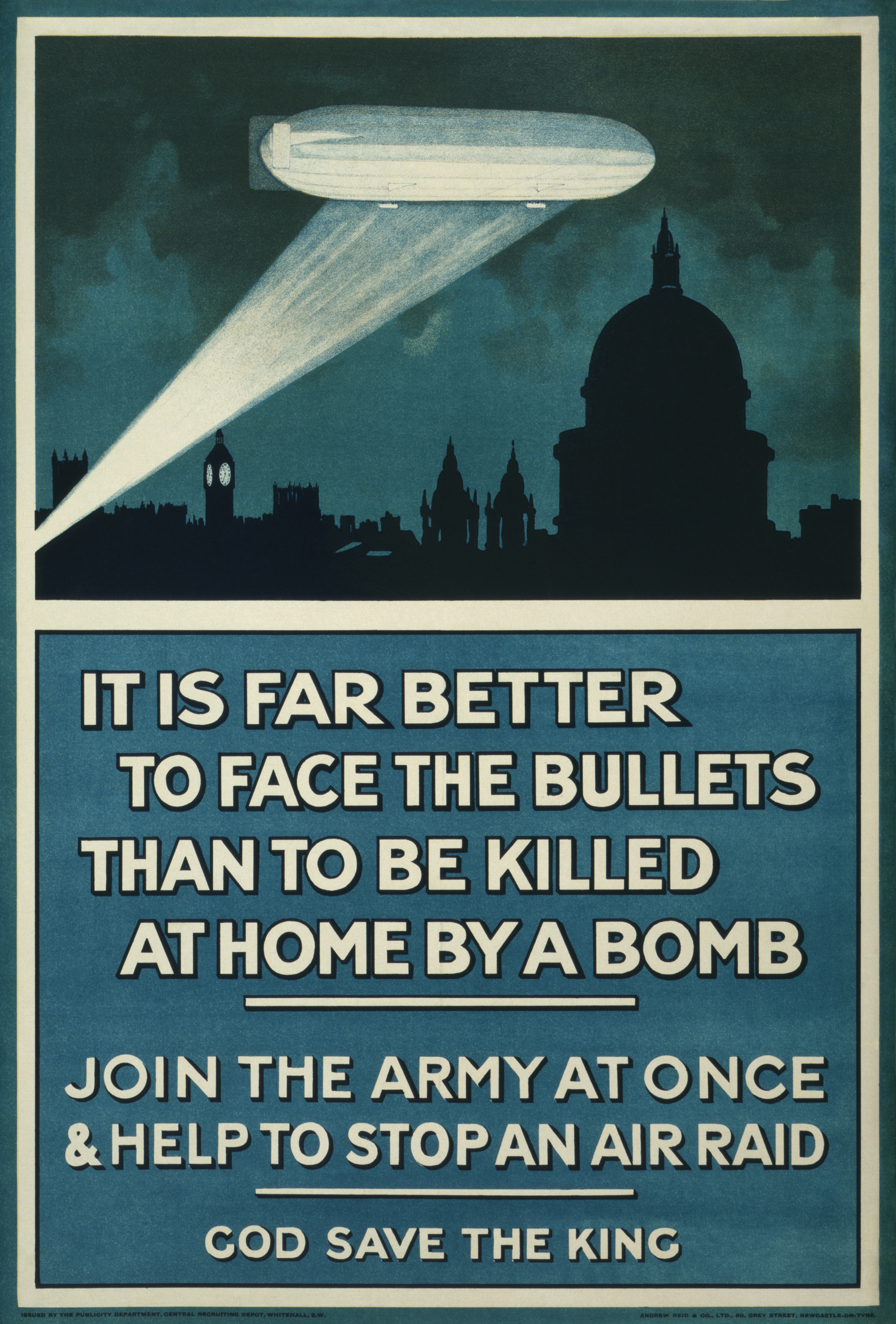
A British First World War poster of a Zeppelin above London at night

At the beginning of the conflict, the German command had high hopes for the airships, which were considerably more capable than contemporary light fixed-wing machines: they were almost as fast, could carry multiple machine guns, and had enormously greater bomb-load range and endurance. Contrary to expectation, it was not easy to ignite the hydrogen using standard bullets and shrapnel. The Allies only started to exploit the Zeppelin's great vulnerability to fire when a combination of Pomeroy and Brock explosive ammunition with Buckingham incendiary ammunition was used in fighter aircraft machine guns during 1916. This led to more than a dozen Zeppelins being shot down over the United Kingdom.

The British had been concerned over the threat posed by Zeppelins since 1909, and attacked the Zeppelin bases early in the war. LZ 25 was destroyed in its hangar at Düsseldorf on 8 October 1914 by bombs dropped by Flt Lt Reginald Marix, RNAS, and the sheds at Cologne, while the Zeppelin works in Friedrichshafen were also attacked. These raids were followed by the Cuxhaven Raid on Christmas Day 1914, one of the first operations carried out by ship-launched aeroplanes.

Airship raids on Great Britain were approved by the Kaiser on 7 January 1915, although he excluded London as a target and further demanded that no attacks be made on historic buildings. The raids were intended to target only military sites on the east coast and around the Thames estuary, but bombing accuracy was poor owing to the height at which the airships flew, and navigation was problematic. The airships relied largely on dead reckoning, supplemented by a radio direction-finding system of limited accuracy. After blackouts became widespread, many bombs fell at random on uninhabited countryside.

===== 1915 =====
The first raid on Britain took place on the night of 19–20 January 1915. Two Zeppelins, L 3 and L 4, intended to attack targets near the River Humber but, diverted by strong winds, eventually dropped their bombs on Great Yarmouth, Sheringham, King's Lynn and the surrounding villages, killing four and injuring 16. Material damage was estimated at £7,740.

The Kaiser authorised the bombing of the London docks on 12 February 1915, but no raids on London took place until May. Two Navy raids failed due to bad weather on 14 and 15 April, and it was decided to delay further attempts until the more capable P class Zeppelins were in service. The Army received the first of these, LZ 38, and Erich Linnarz commanded it on a raid over Ipswich on 29–30 April and another, attacking Southend on 9–10 May. LZ 38 also attacked Dover and Ramsgate on 16–17 May, before returning to bomb Southend on 26–27 May. These four raids killed six people and injured six, causing property damage estimated at £16,898. Twice, Royal Naval Air Service (RNAS) aircraft tried to intercept LZ 38, but on both occasions, it was either able to outclimb the aircraft or was already at too great an altitude for the aircraft to intercept.

On 31 May, Linnarz commanded LZ 38 on the first raid against London. In total, some 120 bombs were dropped on a line stretching from Stoke Newington south to Stepney and then north toward Leytonstone. Seven people were killed and 35 were injured. 41 fires were started, burning out seven buildings, and the total damage was assessed at £18,596. Aware of the problems that the Germans were experiencing in navigation, this raid caused the government to issue a D notice prohibiting the press from reporting anything about raids that was not mentioned in official statements. Only one of the 15 defensive sorties managed to make visual contact with the enemy, and one of the pilots, Flt Lieut D. M. Barnes, was killed on attempting to land.

The first naval attempt on London took place on 4 June: strong winds caused the commander of L 9 to misjudge his position, and the bombs were dropped on Gravesend. L 9 was also diverted by the weather on 6–7 June, attacking Hull instead of London and causing considerable damage. On the same night an Army raid of three Zeppelins also failed because of the weather, and as the airships returned to Evere (Brussels) they ran into a counter-raid by RNAS aircraft flying from Furnes, Belgium. LZ 38 was destroyed on the ground, and LZ 37 was intercepted in the air by R. A. J. Warneford, who dropped six bombs on the airship, setting it on fire. All but one of the crew died. Warneford was awarded the Victoria Cross for his achievement. As a consequence of the RNAS raid, both the Army and Navy withdrew from their bases in Belgium.

After an ineffective attack by L 10 on Tyneside on 15–16 June, the short summer nights discouraged further raids for some months, and the remaining Army Zeppelins were reassigned to the Eastern and Balkan fronts. The Navy resumed raids on Britain in August, when three largely ineffective raids were carried out. On 10 August, the anti-aircraft guns had their first success, causing L 12 to come down into the sea off Zeebrugge, and on 17–18 August L 10 became the first Navy airship to reach London. Mistaking the reservoirs of the Lea Valley for the Thames, it dropped its bombs on Walthamstow and Leytonstone. L 10 was destroyed a little over two weeks later: it was struck by lightning and caught fire off Cuxhaven, and the entire crew was killed. Three Army airships set off to bomb London on 7–8 September, of which two succeeded: SL 2 dropped bombs between Southwark and Woolwich: LZ 74 scattered 39 bombs over Cheshunt before heading on to London and dropping a single bomb on Fenchurch Street station.

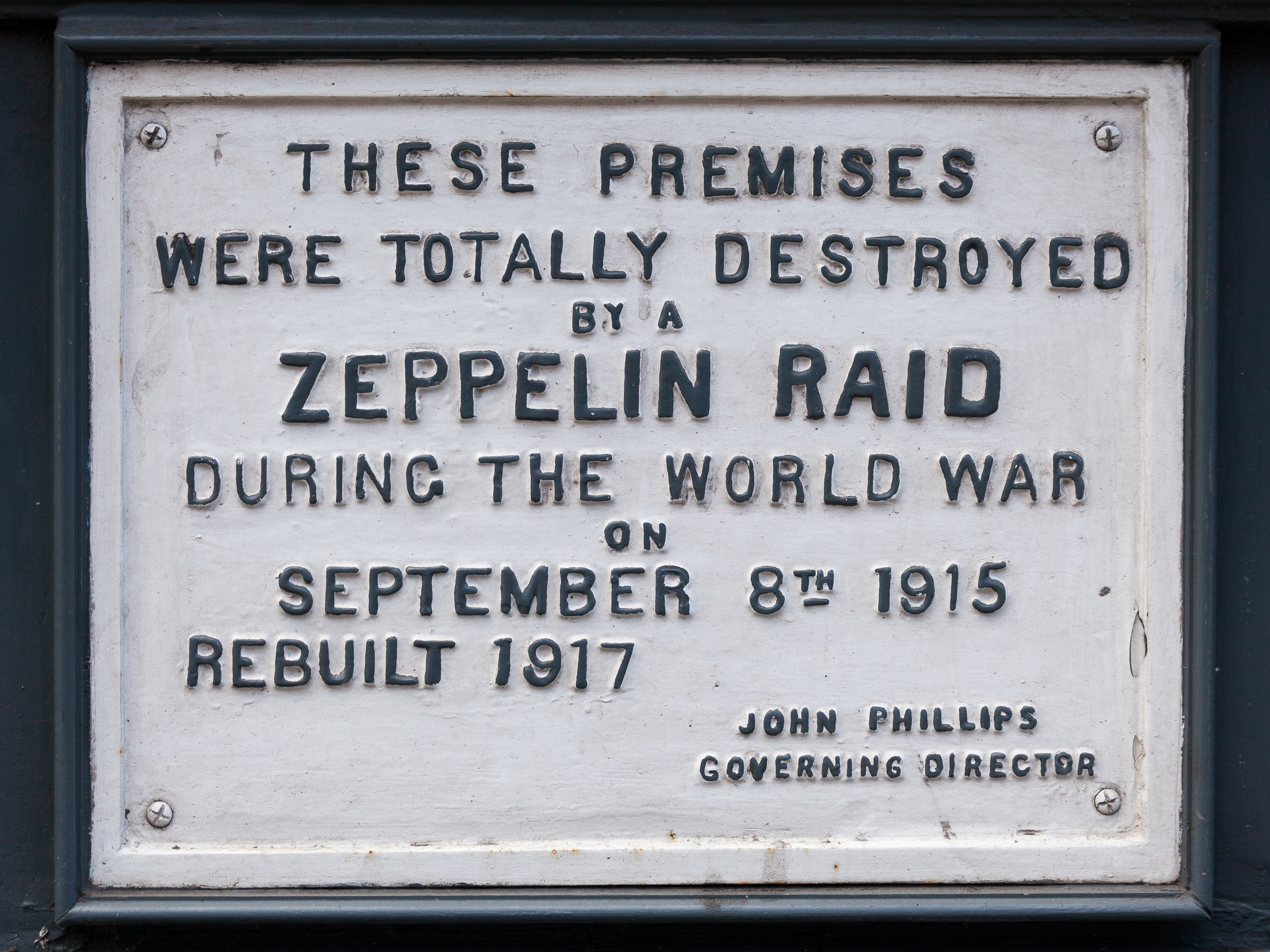
A commemorative plaque at 61 Farringdon Road, London

The Navy attempted to follow up on the Army's success the following night. One Zeppelin targeted the benzole plant at Skinningrove and three set off to bomb London: two were forced to turn back, but L 13, commanded by Kapitänleutnant Heinrich Mathy, reached London. The bomb-load included a 300-kilogram (660 lb) bomb, the largest yet carried. This exploded near Smithfield Market, destroying several houses and killing two men. More bombs fell on the textile warehouses north of St Paul's Cathedral, causing a fire which, despite the attendance of 22 fire engines, caused over half a million pounds of damage: Mathy then turned east, dropping his remaining bombs on Liverpool Street station. The Zeppelin was the target of concentrated anti-aircraft fire, but no hits were scored, and the falling shrapnel caused both damage and alarm on the ground. The raid killed 22 people and injured 87. The monetary cost of the damage was over one-sixth of the total damage costs inflicted by bombing raids during the war.

After three more raids were scattered by the weather, a five-Zeppelin raid was launched by the Navy on 13 October, the "Theatreland Raid." Arriving over the Norfolk coast at around 18:30, the Zeppelins encountered new ground defences installed since the September raid; these had no success, although the airship commanders commented on the improved defences of the city. L 15 began bombing over Charing Cross, the first bombs striking the Lyceum Theatre and the corner of Exeter and Wellington Streets, killing 17 and injuring 20. None of the other Zeppelins reached central London: bombs fell on Woolwich, Guildford, Tonbridge, Croydon, Hertford, and an army camp near Folkestone. A total of 71 people were killed and 128 injured. This was the last raid of 1915, as bad weather coincided with the new moon in both November and December 1915 and continued into January 1916.

Although these raids had no significant military impact, the psychological effect was considerable. The writer D. H. Lawrence described one raid in a letter to Lady Ottoline Morrell:

Then we saw the Zeppelin above us, just ahead, amid a gleaming of clouds: high up, like a bright golden finger, quite small (...) Then there was flashes near the ground—and the shaking noise. It was like Milton—then there was war in heaven. (...) I cannot get over it, that the moon is not Queen of the sky by night, and the stars the lesser lights. It seems the Zeppelin is in the zenith of the night, golden like a moon, having taken control of the sky; and the bursting shells are the lesser lights.

===== 1916 =====
The raids continued in 1916. In December 1915, additional P-class Zeppelins and the first of the new Q-class airships were delivered. The Q-class was an enlargement of the P-class with improved ceiling and bomb-load.

The Army took full control of ground defences in February 1916, and a variety of sub 4-inch (less than 102 mm) calibre guns were converted to anti-aircraft use. Searchlights were introduced, initially manned by police. By mid-1916, there were 271 anti-aircraft guns and 258 searchlights across England. Aerial defences against Zeppelins were divided between the RNAS and the Royal Flying Corps (RFC), with the Navy engaging enemy airships approaching the coast while the RFC took responsibility once the enemy had crossed the coastline. Initially, the War Office had believed that the Zeppelins used a layer of inert gas to protect themselves from incendiary bullets and favoured the use of bombs or devices like the Ranken dart. However, by mid-1916, an effective mixture of explosive, tracer, and incendiary rounds had been developed. There were 23 airship raids in 1916, in which 125 tons of bombs were dropped, killing 293 people and injuring 691.

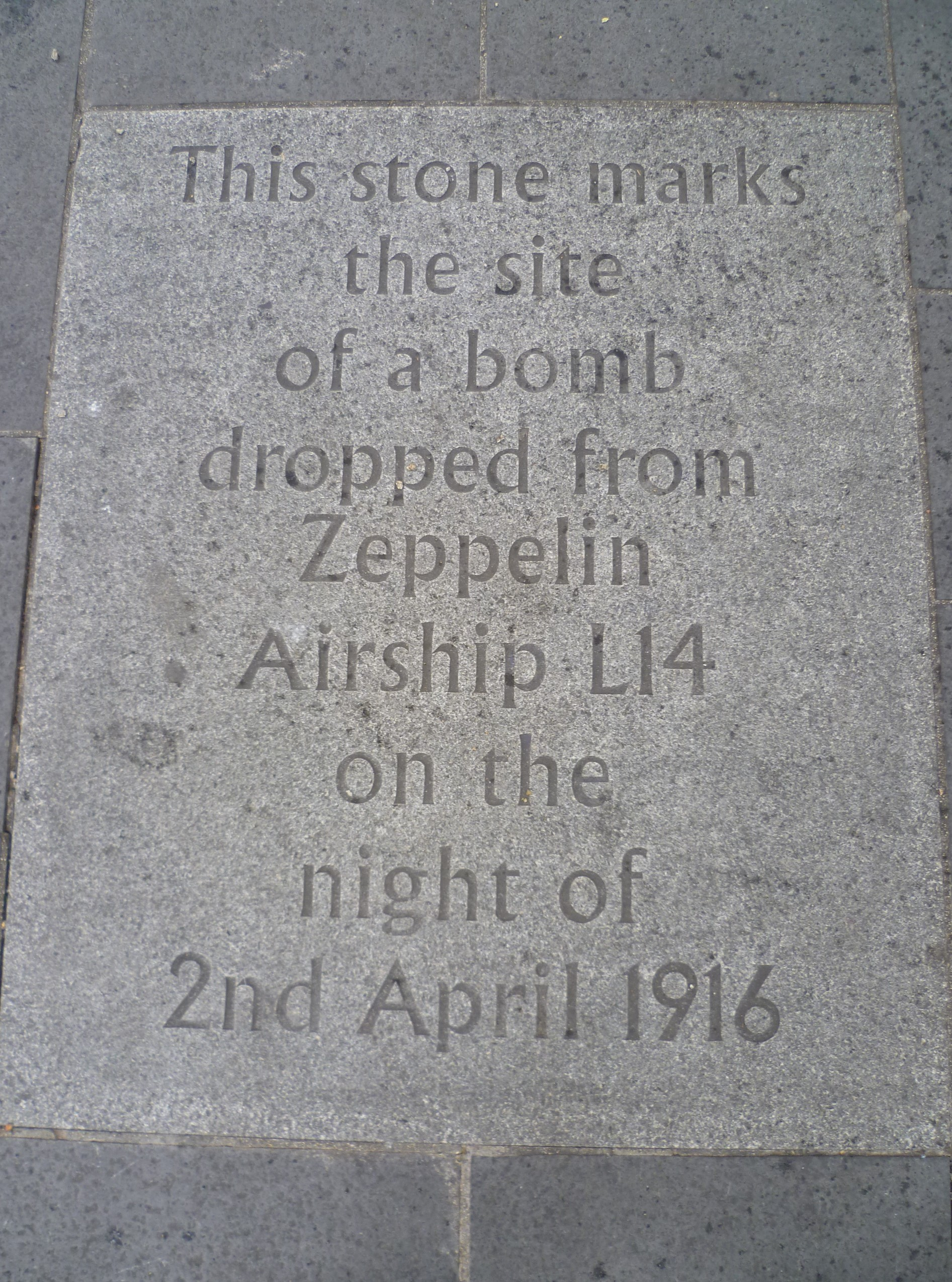
Zeppelin memorial flagstone, Edinburgh

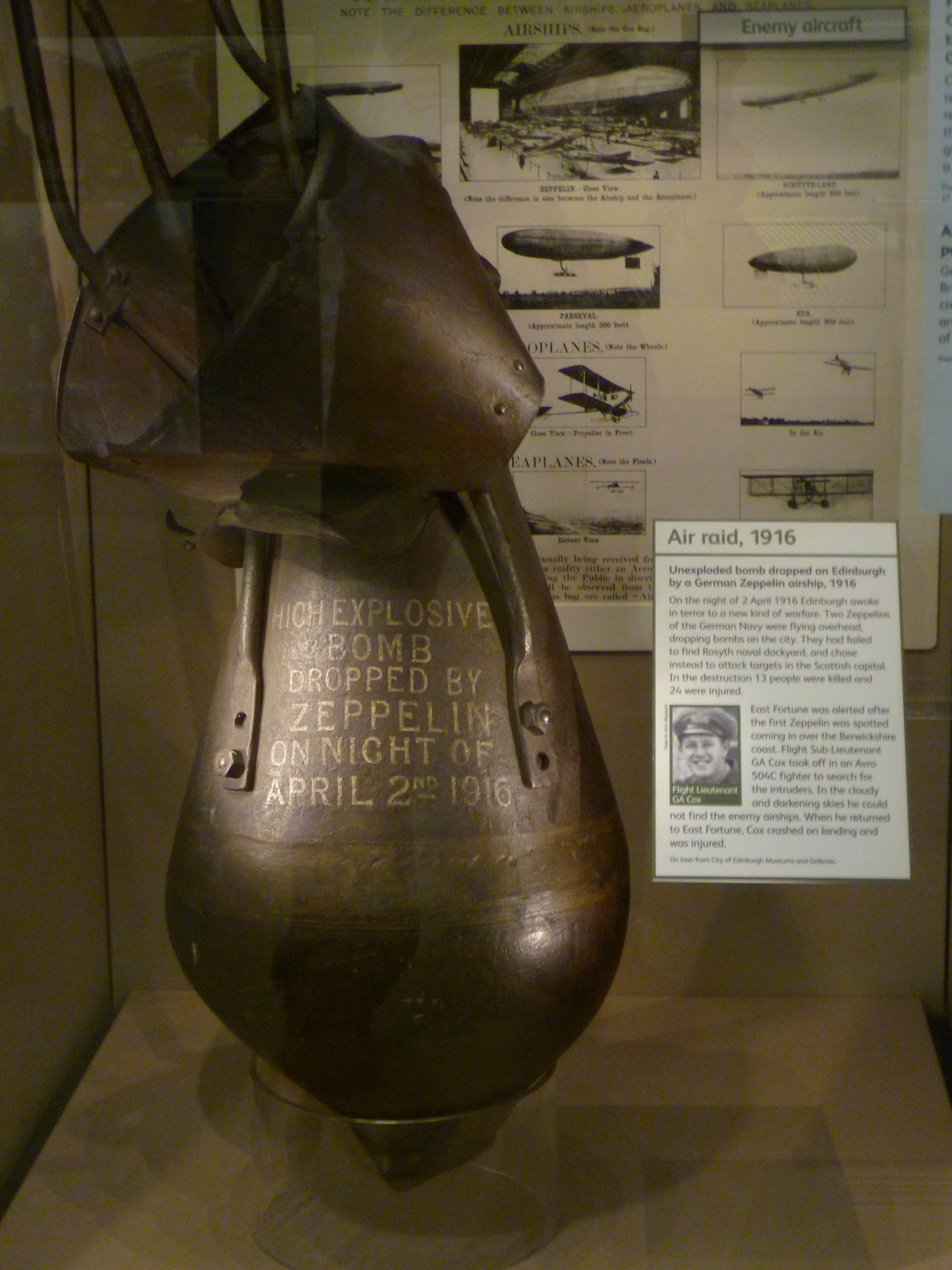
Zeppelin bomb, on display at the National Museum of Flight near Edinburgh

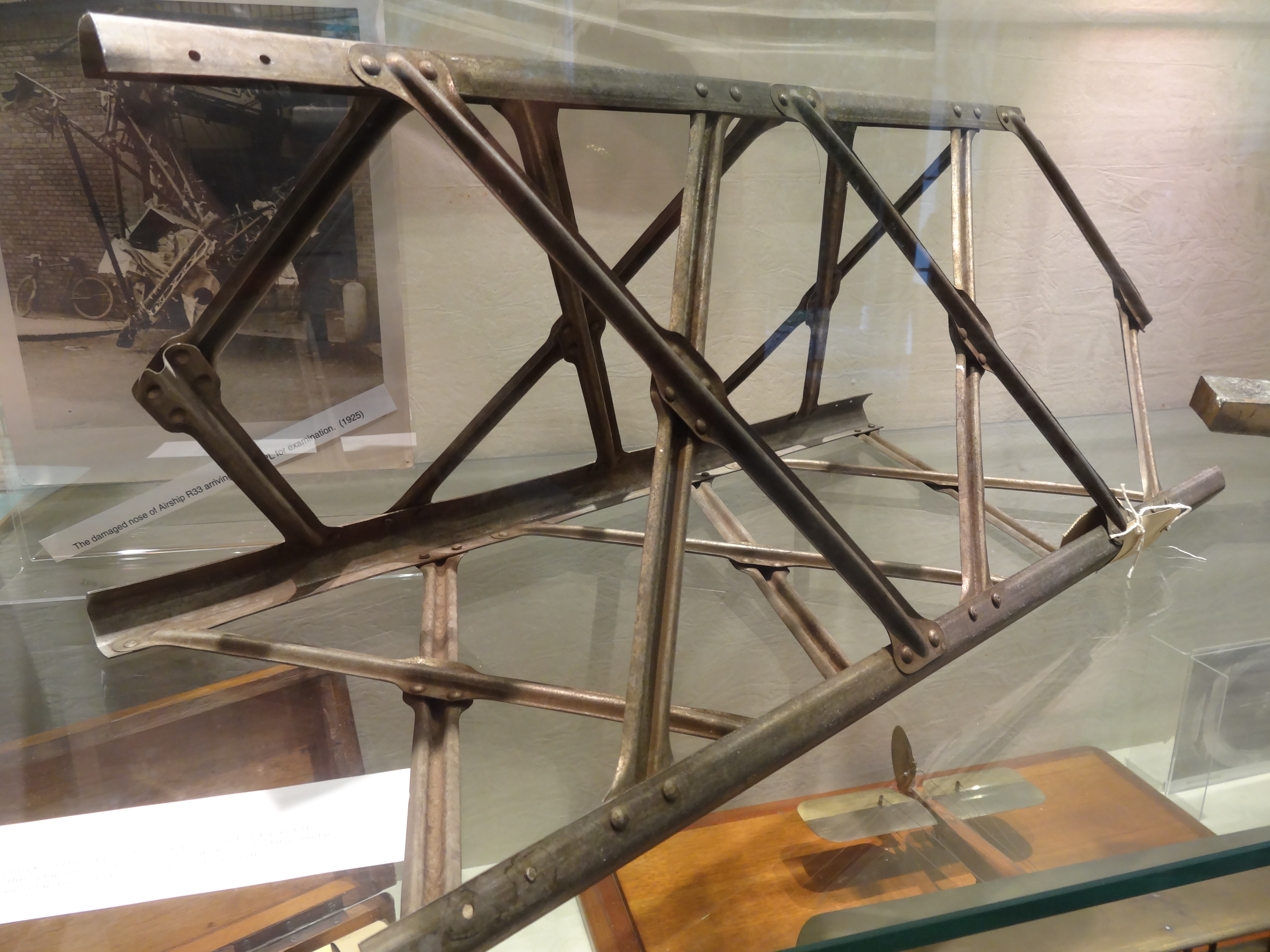
Section of girder from a Zeppelin shot down in England in 1916. Now at the National Physical Laboratory.

The first raid of 1916 was carried out by the German Navy. Nine Zeppelins were sent to Liverpool on the night of 31 January – 1 February. A combination of poor weather and mechanical problems scattered them across the Midlands, and several towns were bombed. A total of 61 people were reported killed and 101 injured by the raid. Despite ground fog, 22 aircraft took off to find the Zeppelins, but none succeeded, and two pilots were killed when attempting to land. One airship, the L 19, came down in the North Sea because of engine failure and damage from Dutch ground-fire. Although the wreck stayed afloat for a while and was sighted by a British fishing trawler, the boat's crew refused to rescue the Zeppelin's crew because they were outnumbered, and all 16 crew died.

Further raids were delayed by an extended period of poor weather and also by the withdrawal of the majority of Naval Zeppelins in an attempt to resolve the recurrent engine failures. Three Zeppelins set off to bomb Rosyth on 5–6 March but were forced by high winds to divert to Hull, killing 18, injuring 52 and causing £25,005 damage. At the beginning of April raids were attempted on five successive nights. Ten airships set off on 31 March: most turned back, and L 15, damaged by anti-aircraft fire and an aircraft attacking using Ranken darts, came down in the sea near Margate. Most of the 48 killed in the raid were victims of a single bomb which fell on an Army billet in Cleethorpes. The following night, two Navy Zeppelins bombed targets in the north of England, killing 22 and injuring 130. On the night of 2–3 April, a six-airship raid was made, targeting the naval base at Rosyth, the Forth Bridge and London. None of the airships bombed their intended targets; 13 were killed, 24 injured and much of the £77,113 damage was caused by the destruction of a warehouse in Leith containing whisky. Raids on 4–5 April and 5‐6 April had little effect, as did a five-Zeppelin raid on 25–26 April and a raid by a single Army Zeppelin the following night. On 2–3 July, a nine-Zeppelin raid against Manchester and Rosyth was largely ineffective due to weather conditions, and one was forced to land in neutral Denmark, its crew being interned.

On 28–29 July, the first raid to include one of the new and much larger R-class Zeppelins, L 31, took place. The 10-Zeppelin raid achieved very little; four turned back early and the rest wandered over a fog-covered landscape before giving up. Adverse weather dispersed raids on 30–31 July and 2–3 August, and on 8–9 August nine airships attacked Hull with little effect. On 24–25 August 12 Navy Zeppelins were launched: eight turned back without attacking and only Heinrich Mathy's L 31 reached London; flying above low clouds, 36 bombs were dropped in 10 minutes on south east London. Nine people were killed, 40 injured and £130,203 of damage was caused.

Zeppelins were very difficult to attack successfully at high altitude, although this also made accurate bombing impossible. Aeroplanes struggled to reach a typical altitude of 10,000 feet (3,000 m), and firing the solid bullets usually used by aircraft guns was ineffectual: they only made small holes, causing inconsequential gas leaks. Britain developed new bullets, the Brock containing oxidant potassium chlorate, and the Buckingham filled with phosphorus, which reacted with the chlorate to catch fire and hence ignite the Zeppelin's hydrogen. These had become available by September 1916.

The biggest raid to date was launched on 2–3 September, when twelve German Navy and four Army airships set out to bomb London. A combination of rain and snowstorms scattered the airships while they were still over the North Sea. Only one of the naval airships came within seven miles of central London, and both damage and casualties were slight. The newly commissioned Schütte-Lanz SL 11 dropped a few bombs on Hertfordshire while approaching London: it was picked up by searchlights as it bombed Ponders End and at around 02:15 it was intercepted by a B.E.2c flown by Lt. William Leefe Robinson, who fired three 40-round drums of Brocks and Buckingham ammunition into the airship. The third drum started a fire, and the airship was quickly enveloped in flames. It fell to the ground near Cuffley, witnessed by the crews of several of the other Zeppelins and many on the ground; there were no survivors. The victory earned Leefe Robinson a Victoria Cross; the pieces of SL 11 were gathered up and sold as souvenirs by the Red Cross to raise money for wounded soldiers.

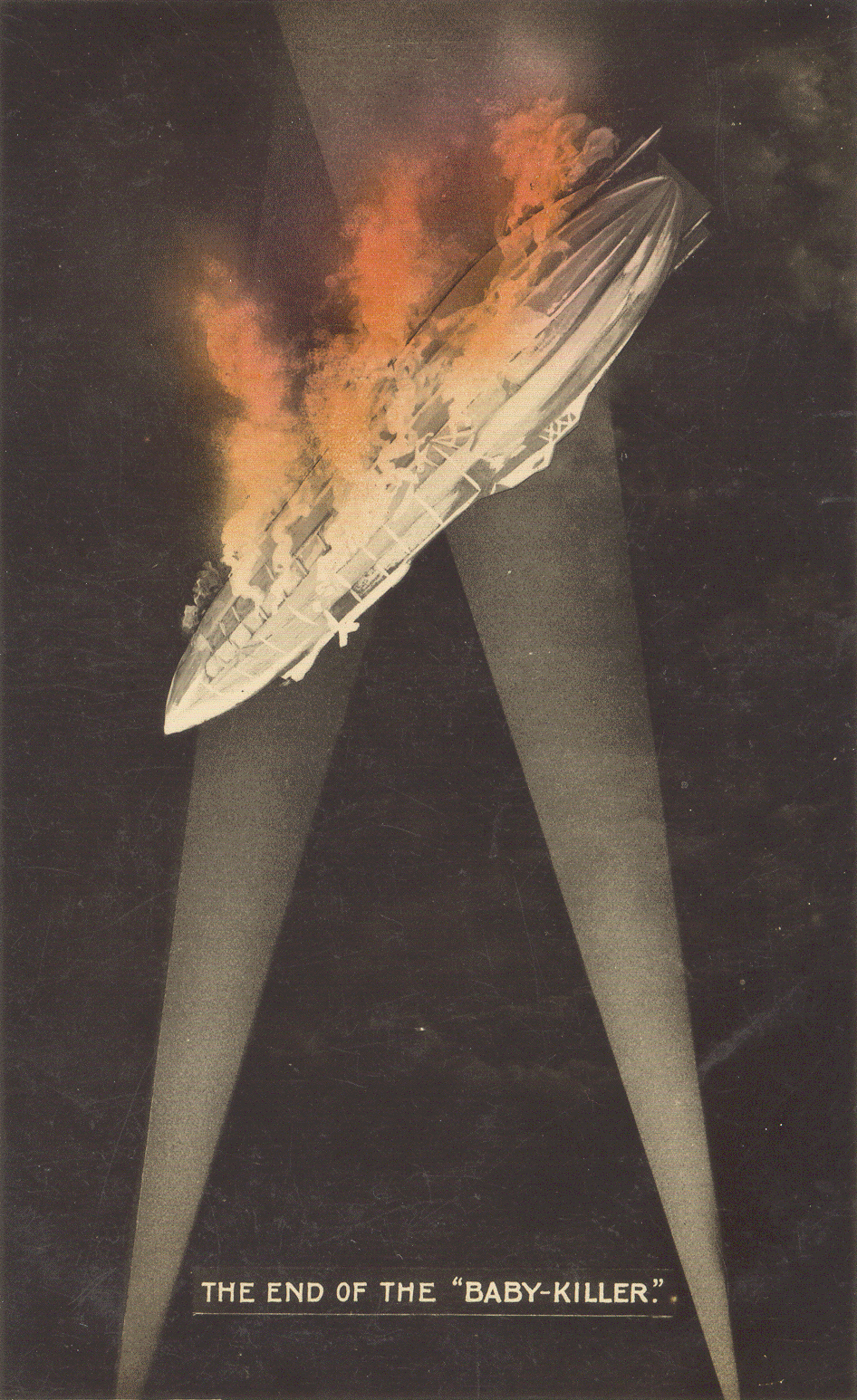
British propaganda postcard, entitled "The End of the 'Baby-Killer'"

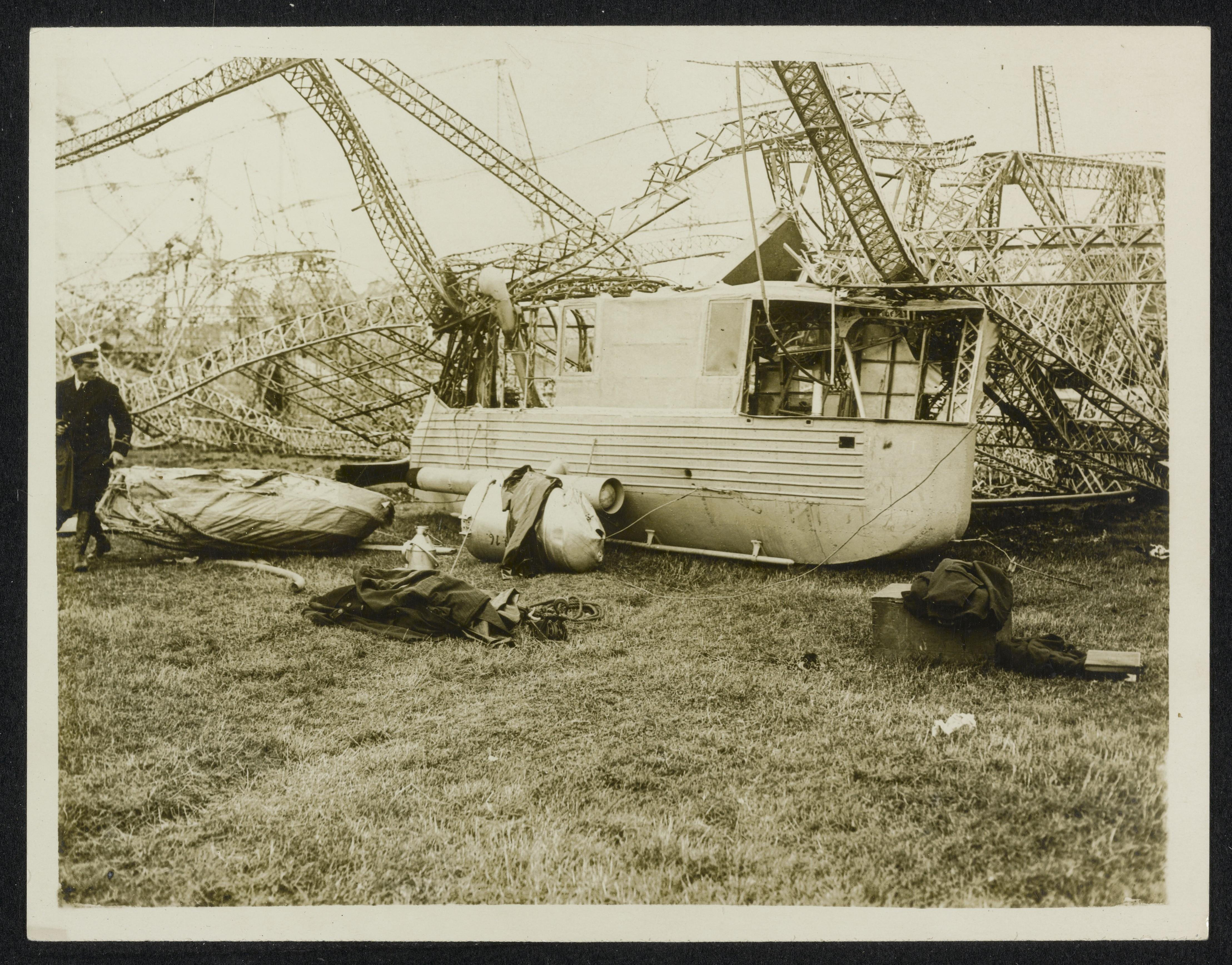
A damaged Zeppelin gondola with a collapsible boat lying nearby. September 1916.

The loss of SL 11 to the new ammunition ended the German Army's enthusiasm for raids on Britain. The German Navy remained aggressive, and another 12-Zeppelin raid was launched on 23–24 September. Eight older airships bombed targets in the Midlands and northeast, while four R-class Zeppelins attacked London. L 30 did not even cross the coast, dropping its bombs at sea. L 31 approached London from the south, dropping a few bombs on the southern suburbs before crossing the Thames and bombing Leyton, killing eight people and injuring 30.

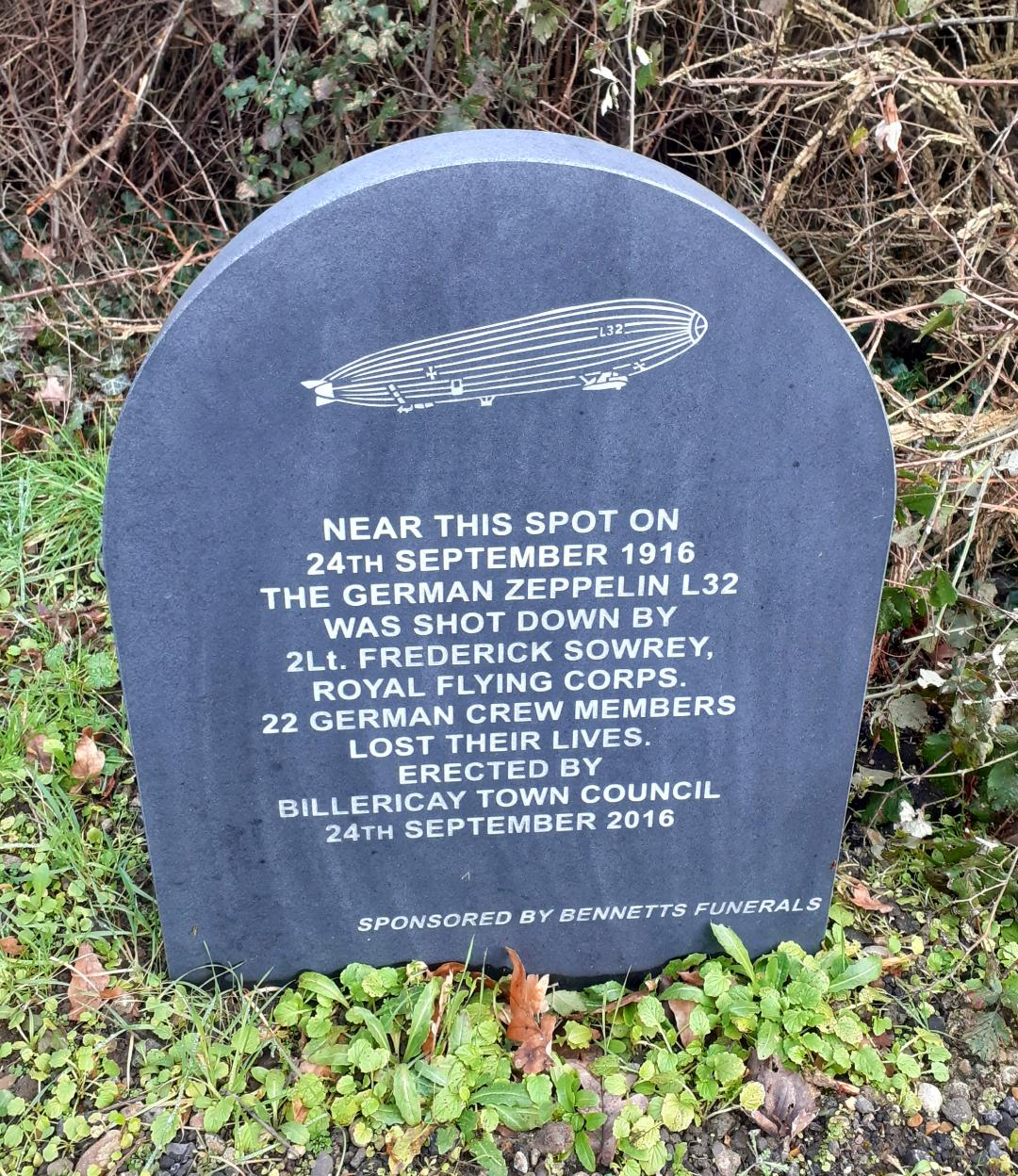
L32 Great Burstead Memorial

L 32 was piloted by Oberleutnant Werner Peterson of the Naval Airship Service, who had only taken command of L 32 in August 1916. L 32 approached from the south, crossing the English Channel close to Dungeness lighthouse, passing Tunbridge Wells at 12:10 and dropping bombs on Sevenoaks and Swanley before crossing over Purfleet. After receiving heavy gunfire and encountering a multitude of anti-aircraft search lights over London, Peterson decided to head up the Essex coast from Tilbury and abort the mission. Water ballast was dropped to gain altitude, and L 32 climbed to 13,000 feet. Shortly afterwards, at 12:45 L 32 was spotted by 2nd Lieutenant Frederick Sowrey of the Royal Flying Corps, who had taken off from nearby RAF Hornchurch (known at the time as Sutton's Farm). As Sowrey approached, he fired three drums of ammunition into the hull of L 32, including the latest Bock & Pomeroy incendiary rounds. L 32, according to witness accounts, violently turned and lost altitude, burning from both ends and along its back. The airship narrowly missed Billericay High Street as it passed over, one witness saying the windows to her home rattled and the Zeppelin sounded like a hissing freight train. L 32 continued down Hillside and came down at Snail's Hall Farm off Green Farm Lane in Great Burstead, crashing at 01:30 on farm land; the 650-foot-long airship struck a large oak tree.

The entire 22 crew was killed. Two crew members jumped rather than be burned (one was said to be Werner Peterson). The crew's bodies were kept in a barn nearby until 27 September, when the Royal Flying Corps transported them to nearby Great Burstead Church. They were interred there until 1966, when they were reinterred at the German Military Cemetery in Cannock Chase. Attending the scene of the crash site were the Royal Naval Intelligence, who recovered the latest secret code book, which was found within the gondola of the crashed L32.

L 33 dropped a few incendiaries over Upminster and Bromley-by-Bow, where it was hit by an anti-aircraft shell, despite being at an altitude of 13,000 feet (4,000 m). As it headed towards Chelmsford, it began to lose height and came down close to Little Wigborough. The airship was set alight by its crew, but inspection of the wreckage provided the British with much information about the construction of Zeppelins, which was used in the design of the British R33-class airships.

The next raid came on 1 October 1916. Eleven Zeppelins were launched at targets in the Midlands and at London. Only L 31, commanded by the experienced Heinrich Mathy, making his 15th raid, reached London. As the airship neared Cheshunt at about 23:20, it was picked up by searchlights and attacked by three aircraft from No. 39 Squadron. 2nd Lieutenant Wulstan Tempest succeeded in setting fire to the airship, which came down near Potters Bar. All 19 crew died, many jumping from the burning airship.

For the next raid, on 27–28 November, the Zeppelins avoided London for targets in the Midlands. Again the defending aircraft were successful: L 34 was shot down over the mouth of the Tees and L 21 was attacked by two aircraft and crashed into the sea off Lowestoft. There were no further raids in 1916 although the Navy lost three more craft, all on 28 December: SL 12 was destroyed at Ahlhorn by strong winds after sustaining damage in a poor landing, and at Tondern L 24 crashed into the shed while landing: the resulting fire destroyed both L 24 and the adjacent L 17.

===== 1917 =====
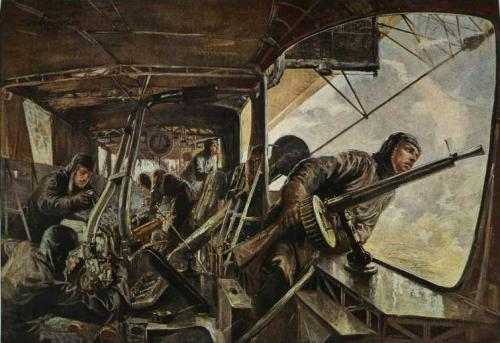
1917 watercolour by Felix Schwormstädt – translated title: "In the rear engine gondola of a Zeppelin airship during the flight through enemy airspace after a successful attack on England"

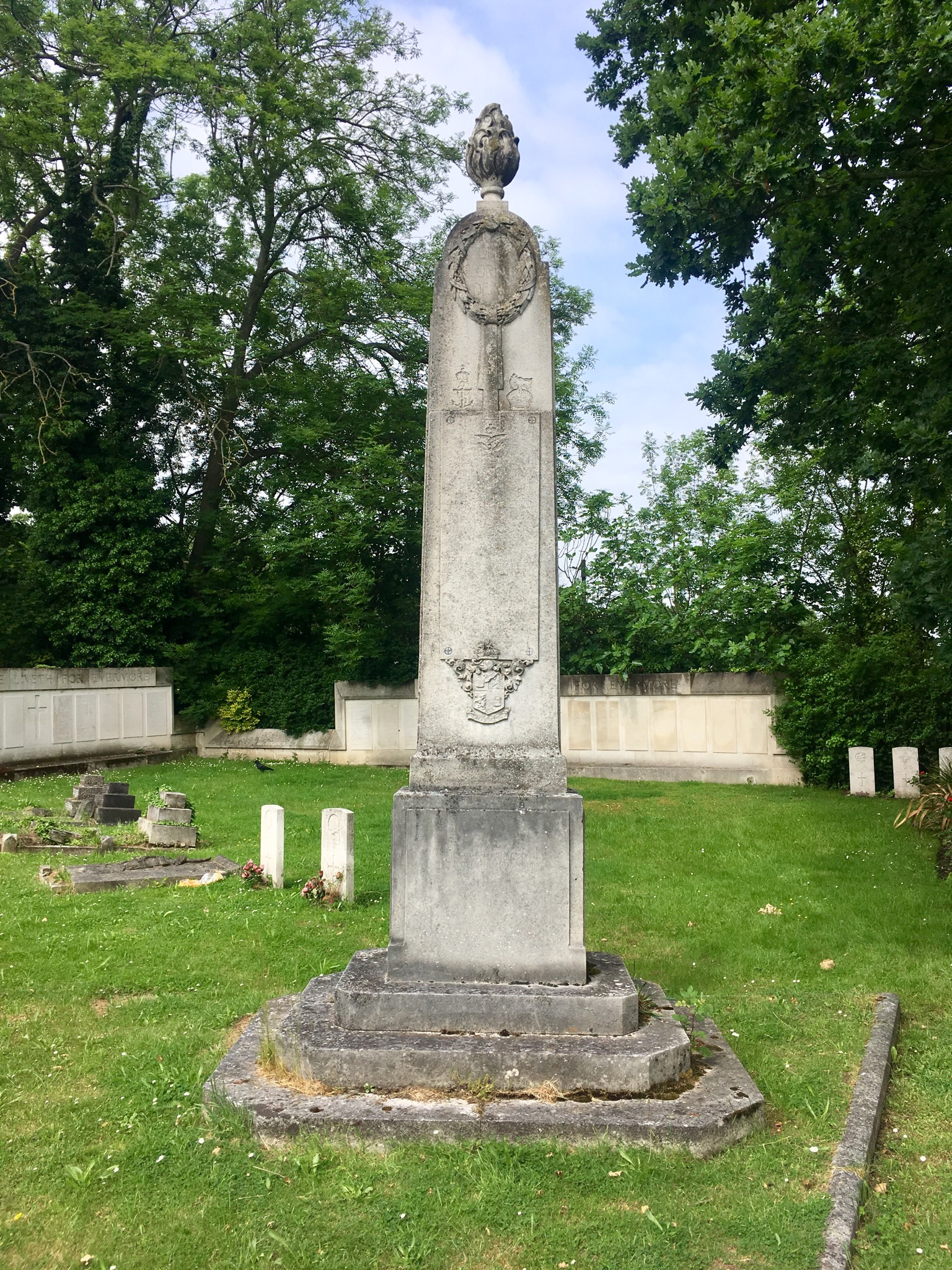
Memorial in Camberwell Old Cemetery, London, to 21 civilians killed by Zeppelin bombings in 1917

To counter the increasingly effective defences, new Zeppelins were introduced, which had an increased operating altitude of 16,500 feet (5,000 m) and a ceiling of 21,000 feet (6,400 m). The first of these S-class Zeppelins, LZ 91 (L 42) entered service in February 1917. They were basically a modification of the R-class, sacrificing strength and power for improved altitude. The surviving R-class Zeppelins were adapted by removing one of the engines. The improved safety was offset by the extra strain on the airship crews caused by altitude sickness and exposure to extreme cold and operating difficulties caused by cold and unpredictable high winds encountered at altitude.

The first raid of 1917 did not occur until 16–17 March: the five Zeppelins encountered very strong winds and none reached their targets. This experience was repeated on 23–24 May. Two days later, 21 Gotha bombers attempted a daylight raid on London. They were frustrated by heavy clouds, but the effort led the Kaiser to announce that airship raids on London were to stop; under pressure, he later relented to allow the Zeppelins to attack under "favorable circumstances".

On 16–17 June, another raid was attempted. Six Zeppelins were to take part, but two were kept in their shed by high winds, and another two were forced to return by engine failure. L 42 bombed Ramsgate, hitting a munitions store. The month-old L 48, the first U class Zeppelin, was forced to drop to 13,000 feet (4,000 m) where it was caught by four aircraft and destroyed, crashing near Theberton, Suffolk.

After ineffective raids on the Midlands and the north of England on 21–22 August and 24–25 September, the last major Zeppelin raid of the war was launched on 19–20 October, with 13 airships heading for Sheffield, Manchester, and Liverpool. All were hindered by an unexpectedly strong headwind at altitude. L 45 was trying to reach Sheffield, but instead it dropped bombs on Northampton and London: most fell in the north-west suburbs but three 300 kg (660 lb) bombs fell in Piccadilly, Camberwell and Hither Green, causing most of the casualties that night. L 45 then reduced altitude to try to escape the winds but was forced back into the higher air currents by a B.E.2e. The airship then had mechanical failure in three engines and was blown over France, eventually coming down near Sisteron; it was set on fire and the crew surrendered. L 44 was brought down by ground fire over France: L 49 and L 50 were also lost to engine failure and the weather over France. L 55 was badly damaged on landing and later scrapped.

There were no more raids in 1917, although the airships were not abandoned but refitted with new, more powerful engines.

===== 1918 =====
There were only four raids in 1918, all against targets in the Midlands and northern England. Five Zeppelins attempted to bomb the Midlands on 12–13 March to little effect. The following night, three Zeppelins set off, but two turned back because of the weather: the third bombed Hartlepool, killing eight and injuring 29. A five-Zeppelin raid on 12–13 April was also largely ineffective, with thick clouds making accurate navigation impossible. However, some alarm was caused by the other two, one of which reached the east coast and bombed Wigan, believing it was Sheffield: the other bombed Coventry in the belief that it was Birmingham. The final raid on 5 August 1918 involved four airships and resulted in the loss of L.70 and the death of its entire crew under the command of Fregattenkapitän Peter Strasser, head of the Imperial German Naval Airship Service and the Führer der Luftschiffe. Crossing the North Sea during daylight, the airship was intercepted by a Royal Air Force DH.4 biplane piloted by Major Egbert Cadbury, and shot down in flames.

==== Technological progress ====
Zeppelin technology improved considerably as a result of the increasing demands of warfare. The company came under government control, and new personnel were recruited to cope with the increased demand, including the aerodynamicist Paul Jaray and the stress engineer Karl Arnstein. Many of these technological advances originated from Zeppelin's only serious competitor, the Mannheim-based Schütte-Lanz company. While their dirigibles were never as successful, Professor Schütte's more scientific approach to airship design led to important innovations, including the streamlined hull shape, the simpler cruciform fins (replacing the more complicated box-like arrangements of older Zeppelins), individual direct-drive engine cars, anti-aircraft machine-gun positions, and gas ventilation shafts which transferred vented hydrogen to the top of the airship. New production facilities were set up to assemble Zeppelins from components fabricated in Friedrichshafen.

The pre-war M-class designs were quickly enlarged to produce the 163 metres (536 ft) long duralumin P-class, which increased gas capacity from 22,500 to 31,880 m^{3} (794,500 to 1,126,000 ft^{3}), introduced a fully enclosed gondola, and had an extra engine. These modifications added 610 m (2,000 ft) to the maximum ceiling, around 9 km/h (5.6 mph) to the top speed, and greatly increased crew comfort and hence endurance. Twenty-two P-class airships were built; the first, LZ 38, was delivered to the Army on 3 April 1915. The P class was followed by a lengthened version, the Q class.

In July 1916 Luftschiffbau Zeppelin introduced the R-class, 199.49 metres (654 feet 6 inches) long, and with a volume of 55,210 m^{3} (1,949,600 ft^{3}). These could carry loads of three to four tons of bombs and reach speeds of up to 103 km/h (64 mph), powered by six 240 hp (180 kW) Maybach engines.

In 1917, following losses to the air defences over Britain, new designs were produced which were capable of flying at much higher altitudes, typically operating at around 6,100 m (20,000 ft). This was achieved by reducing the weight of the airship by reducing the weight of the structure, halving the bomb load, removing the defensive armament, and reducing the number of engines to five. However, these were not successful as bombers: the greater height at which they operated greatly hindered navigation, and their reduced power made them vulnerable to unfavorable weather conditions.

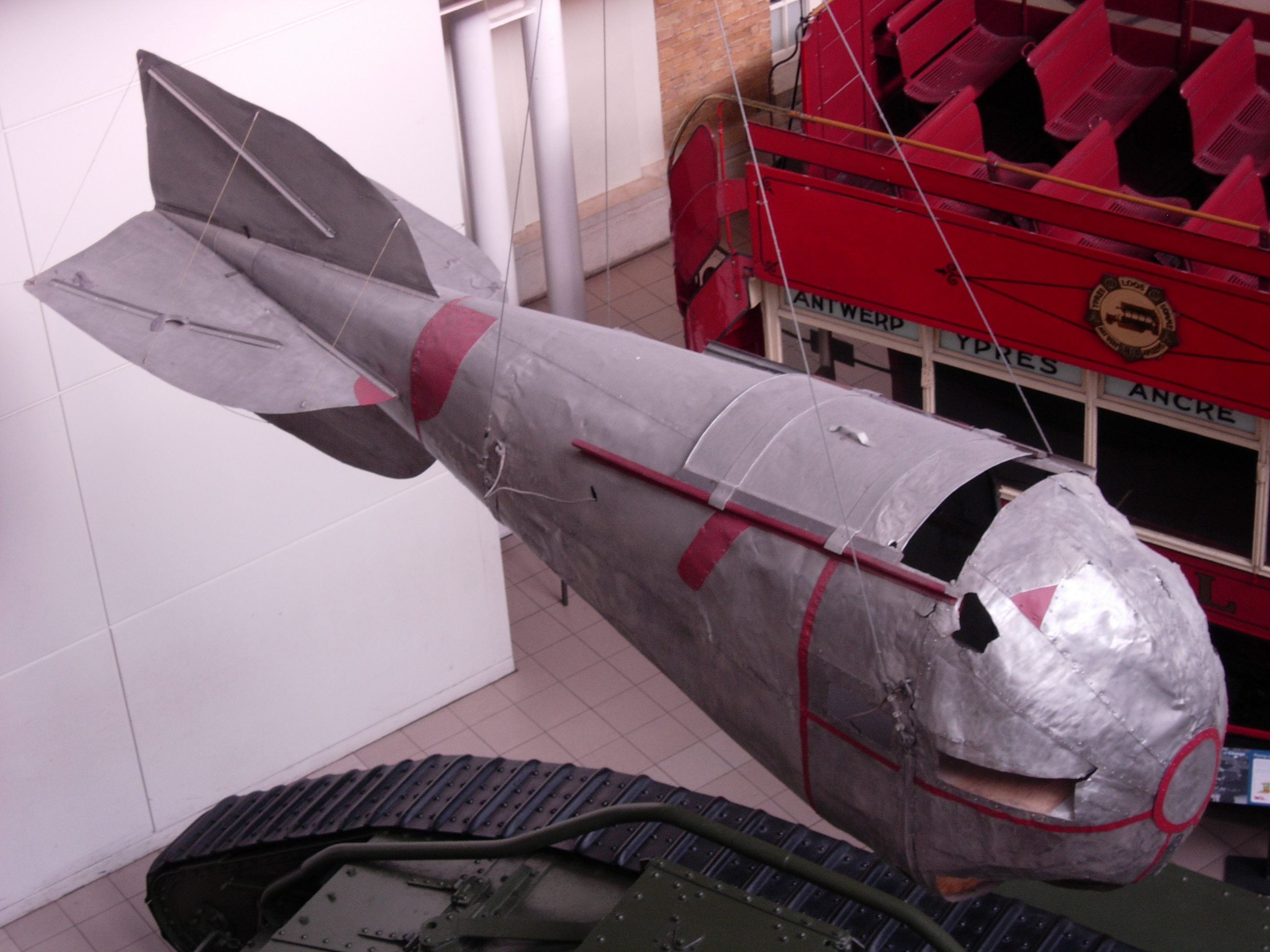
The observation car preserved at the Imperial War Museum

At the beginning of the war Captain Ernst A. Lehmann and Baron Gemmingen, Count Zeppelin's nephew, developed an observation car for use by dirigibles. While the zeppelin flew invisibly within or above the clouds, the car's observer would hang from a cable below the clouds, and relay navigation and bomb dropping orders. It was equipped with a wicker chair, chart table, electric lamp and compass, with telephone line and lightning conductor part of the suspension cable. Although used by Army airships, they were not used by the Navy, since Strasser considered that their weight meant an unacceptable reduction in bomb load.

==== End of the war ====
The German defeat also marked the end of German military dirigibles, as the victorious Allies demanded a complete abolition of German air forces and surrender of the remaining airships as reparations. Specifically, the Treaty of Versailles contained the following articles dealing explicitly with dirigibles:

Article 198
"The armed forces of Germany must not include any military or naval air forces ... No dirigible shall be kept."
Article 202
"On the coming into force of the present Treaty, all military and naval aeronautical material ... must be delivered to the Governments of the Principal Allied and Associated Powers ... In particular, this material will include all items under the following heads which are or have been in use or were designed for warlike purposes:
[...]
- "Dirigibles able to take to the air, being manufactured, repaired or assembled."
- "Plant for the manufacture of hydrogen."
- "Dirigible sheds and shelters of every kind for aircraft."
"Pending their delivery, dirigibles will, at the expense of Germany, be maintained inflated with hydrogen; the plant for the manufacture of hydrogen, as well as the sheds for dirigibles, may at the discretion of the said Powers, be left to Germany until the time when the dirigibles are handed over."

On 23 June 1919, a week before the treaty was signed, many Zeppelin crews destroyed their airships in their hangars to prevent delivery, following the example of the scuttling of the German fleet at Scapa Flow two days earlier. The remaining dirigibles were transferred to France, Italy, Britain, and Belgium in 1920.

A total of 84 Zeppelins were built during the war. Over 60 were lost, roughly evenly divided between accident and enemy action. 51 raids had been made on England alone, (Note: The figures given total 54. While A. Whitehouse in The Zeppelin Fighters (1966) gives figures of 5,907 bombs dropped, 528 people killed, 1,156 wounded in 208 individual sorties.) in which 5,806 bombs were dropped, killing 557 people and injuring 1,358 while causing damage estimated at £1.5 million. It has been argued that the raids were effective far beyond material damage in diverting and hampering wartime production: one estimate is that due to the 1915–16 raids, "one sixth of the total normal output of munitions was entirely lost."

=== After World War I ===
==== Renaissance ====
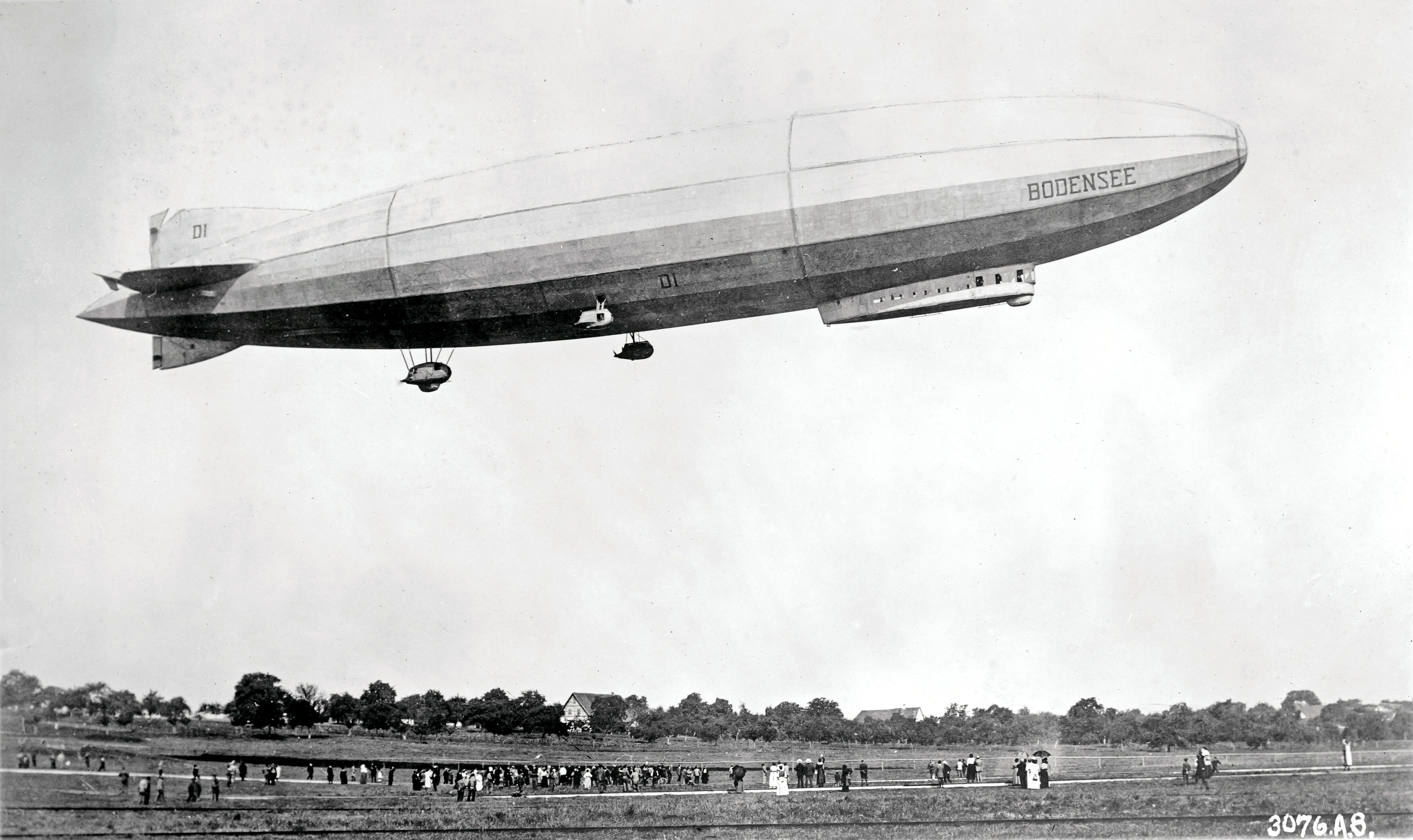
The Bodensee 1919

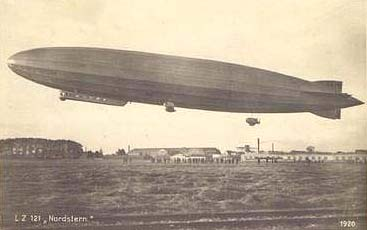
The Nordstern 1920

Count von Zeppelin had died in 1917, before the end of the war. Hugo Eckener, who had long envisioned dirigibles as vessels of peace rather than of war, took command of the Zeppelin business, hoping to quickly resume civilian flights. Despite considerable difficulties, they completed two small passenger airships; LZ 120 Bodensee (scrapped in July 1928), which first flew in August 1919 and in the following months transported passengers between Friedrichshafen and Berlin, and a sister-ship LZ 121 Nordstern, (Scrapped September 1926) which was intended for use on a regular route to Stockholm.

However, in 1921, the Allied Powers demanded that these should be handed over as war reparations as compensation for the dirigibles destroyed by their crews in 1919. Germany was not allowed to construct military aircraft and only airships of less than 28,000 m^{3} (1,000,000 ft^{3}) were permitted. This brought a halt to Zeppelin's plans for airship development, and the company temporarily had to resort to manufacturing aluminium cooking utensils.

Eckener and his co-workers refused to give up and kept looking for investors and a way to circumvent Allied restrictions. Their opportunity came in 1924. The United States had started to experiment with rigid airships, constructing one of their own, the ZR-1 USS Shenandoah, and buying the R38 (based on the Zeppelin L 70) when the British airship programme was cancelled. However, this broke apart and caught fire during a test flight above the Humber on 23 August 1921, killing 44 crewmen.

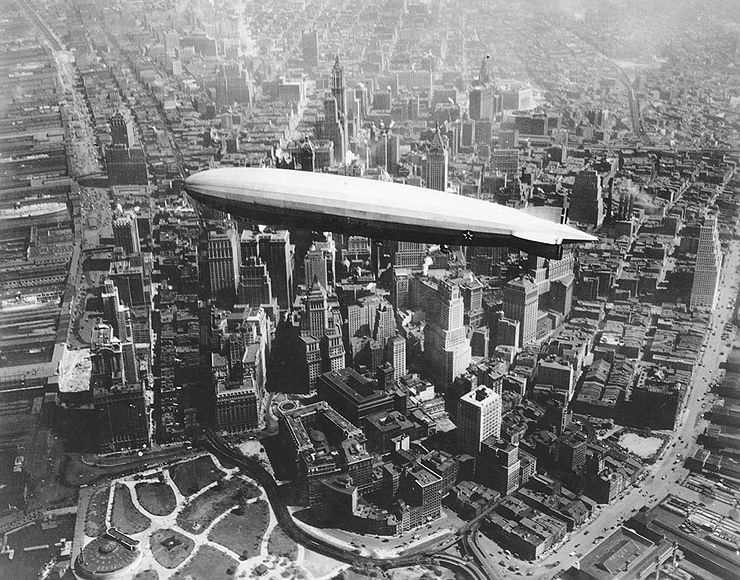
ZR-3 USS Los Angeles over southern Manhattan

Under these circumstances, Eckener managed to obtain an order for the next American dirigible. Germany had to pay for this airship itself, as the cost was set against the war reparations accounts, but for the Zeppelin company, this was unimportant. LZ 126 made its first flight on 27 August 1924.

On 12 October at 07:30 local time, the Zeppelin took off for the US under the command of Hugo Eckener. The ship completed its 8,050 kilometres (5,000 mi) voyage without any difficulties in 80 hours and 45 minutes. American crowds enthusiastically celebrated the arrival, and President Calvin Coolidge invited Eckener and his crew to the White House, calling the new Zeppelin an "angel of peace".

Given the designation ZR-3 USS Los Angeles and refilled with helium (partly sourced from the Shenandoah) after its Atlantic crossing, the airship became the most successful American airship. It operated reliably for eight years until it was retired in 1932 for economic reasons. It was dismantled in August 1940.

==== Golden age ====
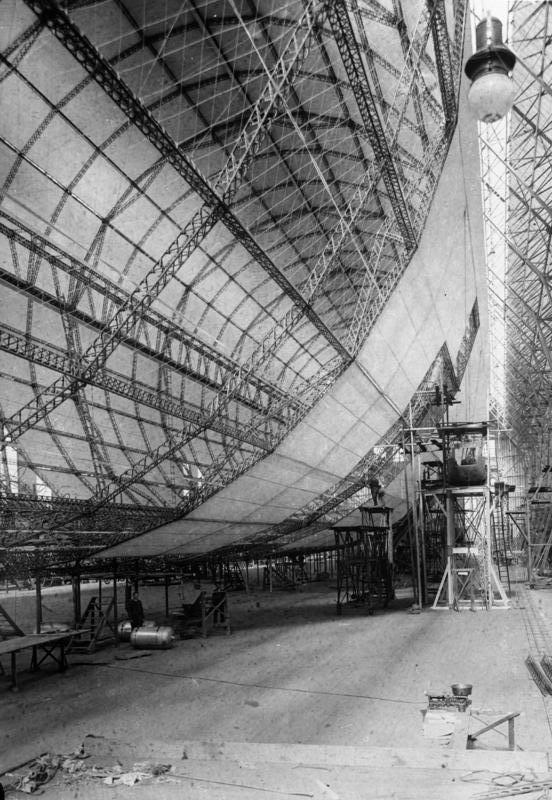
Graf Zeppelin under construction

With the delivery of LZ 126, the Zeppelin company had reasserted its lead in rigid airship construction, but it was not yet fully back in business. In 1926, restrictions on airship construction were relaxed, but acquiring the necessary funds for the next project proved a problem in the difficult economic situation of post–World War I Germany, and it took Eckener two years of lobbying and publicity to secure the realization of LZ 127.

Another two years passed before 18 September 1928, when the new dirigible, christened Graf Zeppelin in honour of the Count, flew for the first time. With a total length of 236.6 metres (776 ft) and a volume of 105,000 m^{3}, it was the largest dirigible to have been built at the time. Eckener's initial purpose was to use Graf Zeppelin for experimental and demonstration purposes to prepare the way for regular airship traveling, carrying passengers and mail to cover the costs.

In October 1928, its first long-range voyage brought it to Lakehurst. The voyage took 112 hours and set a new endurance record for airships. Eckener and his crew, which included his son Hans, were once more welcomed enthusiastically, with confetti parades in New York and another invitation to the White House. Graf Zeppelin toured Germany and visited Italy, Palestine, and Spain. A second trip to the United States was aborted in France due to engine failure in May 1929.

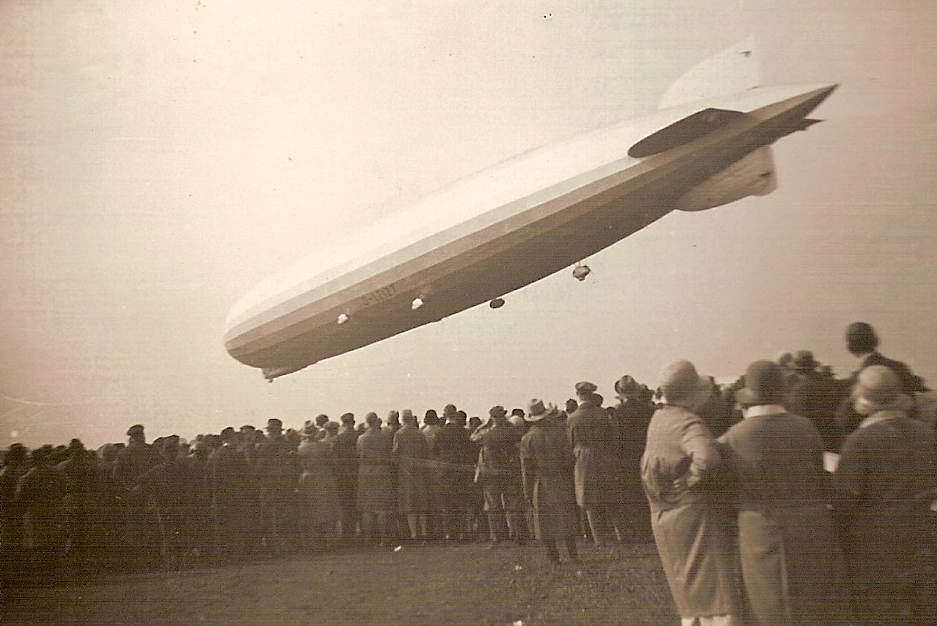
The Graf Zeppelin

In August 1929, Graf Zeppelin departed for another daring enterprise: a circumnavigation of the globe. The growing popularity of the "giant of the air" made it easy for Eckener to find sponsors. One of these was the American press tycoon William Randolph Hearst, who requested that the tour officially start in Lakehurst. As with the October 1928 flight to New York, Hearst had placed a reporter, Grace Marguerite Hay Drummond-Hay, on board: she therefore became the first woman to circumnavigate the globe by air. From there, Graf Zeppelin flew to Friedrichshafen, then Tokyo, Los Angeles, and back to Lakehurst, in 21 days, 5 hours, and 31 minutes. Including the initial and final trips between Friedrichshafen and Lakehurst and back, the dirigible had travelled 49,618 kilometres (30,831 mi).

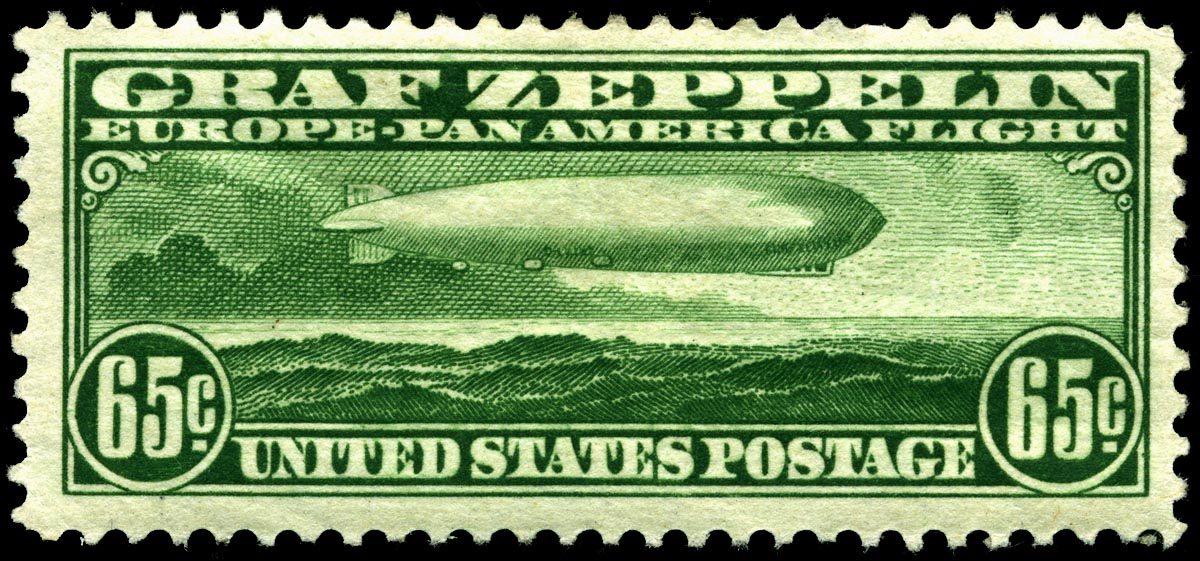
A US Air Mail 1930 stamp picturing the Graf Zeppelin

In the following year, Graf Zeppelin undertook trips around Europe, and following a successful tour to Recife, Brazil in May 1930, it was decided to open the first regular transatlantic airship line. This line operated between Frankfurt and Recife, and was later extended to Rio de Janeiro, with a stop in Recife. Despite the beginning of the Great Depression and growing competition from fixed-wing aircraft, LZ 127 transported an increasing volume of passengers and mail across the ocean every year until 1936. The ship made another spectacular voyage in July 1931 when it made a seven-day research trip to the Arctic. (Note: Koestler was the only journalist on board. He describes the preparations and the voyage itself in detail in his autobiography.) This had already been a dream of Count von Zeppelin twenty years earlier, which could not be realized at the time due to the outbreak of war.

Eckener intended to follow the successful airship with another larger Zeppelin, designated LZ 128. This was to be powered by eight engines, 232 m (761 ft) in length, with a capacity of 199,980 m^{3} (7,062,100 ft^{3}). However, the loss of the British passenger airship R101 on 5 October 1930 led the Zeppelin company to reconsider the safety of hydrogen-filled vessels, and the design was abandoned in favour of a new project, LZ 129. This was intended to be filled with inert helium.

==== Hindenburg, the end of an era ====
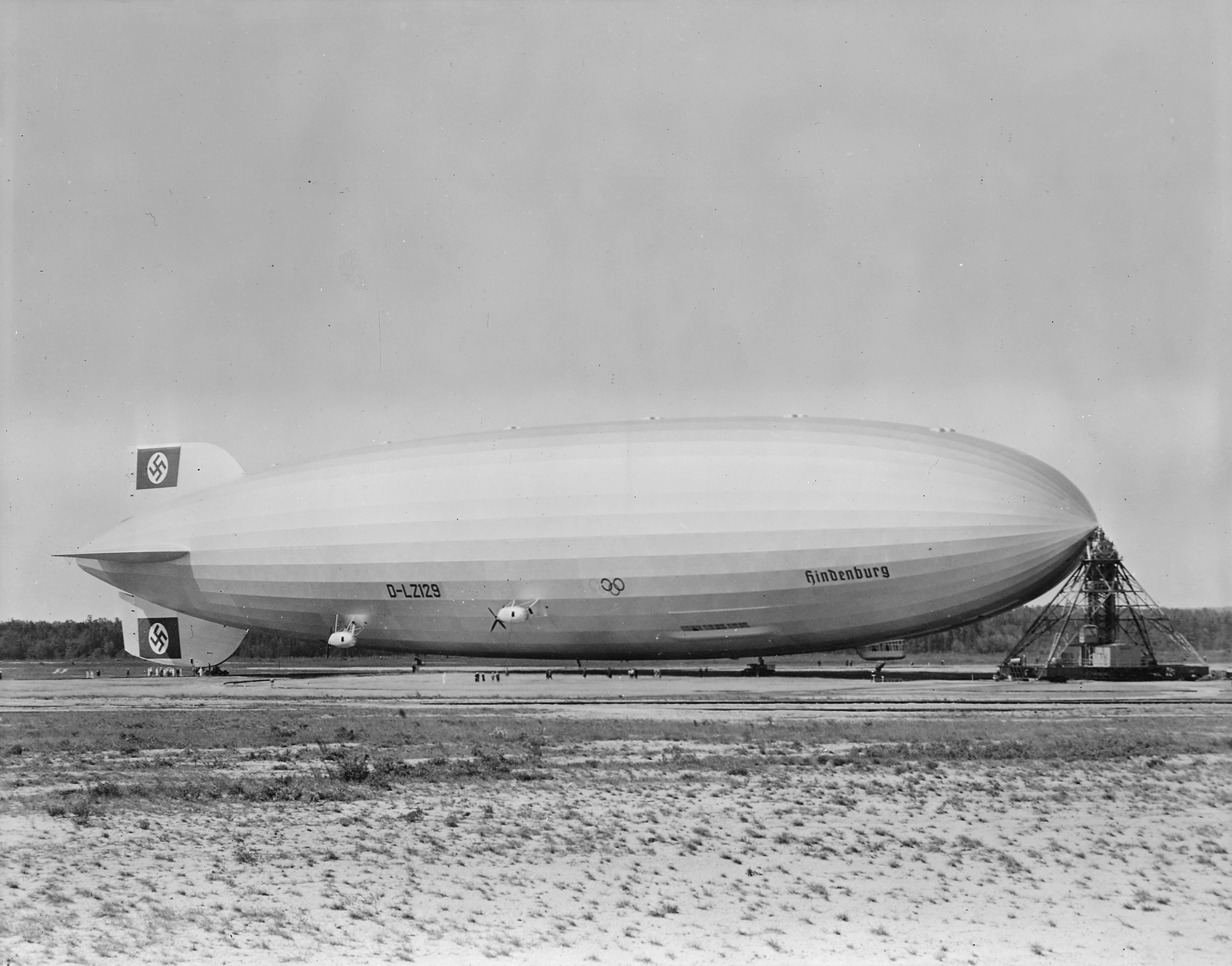
The Hindenburg: note swastikas on tail fins.

The coming to power of the Nazi Party in 1933 had important consequences for Zeppelin Luftschiffbau. Zeppelins became a propaganda tool for the new regime: they would now display the Nazi swastika on their fins and occasionally tour Germany to play march music and propaganda speeches to the people. In 1934, Joseph Goebbels, the Minister of Propaganda, contributed two million Reichsmarks towards the construction of LZ 129.

In 1935 Hermann Göring established a new airline directed by Ernst Lehmann, the Deutsche Zeppelin Reederei, as a subsidiary of Lufthansa to take over Zeppelin operations. Hugo Eckener, the father of the post-war Zeppelin renaissance, was an outspoken anti-Nazi: complaints about the use of Zeppelins for propaganda purposes in 1936 led Goebbels to declare "Dr. Eckener has placed himself outside the pale of society. Henceforth his name is not to be mentioned in the newspapers and his photograph is not to be published".

On 4 March 1936 LZ 129 Hindenburg (named after former President of Germany, Paul von Hindenburg) made its first flight. The Hindenburg was the largest airship ever built. It had been designed to use non-flammable helium, but the only supplies of the rare gas were controlled by the United States, which refused to allow its export. The fatal decision was made to fill the Hindenburg with flammable hydrogen. Apart from propaganda flights, LZ 129 was used on the transatlantic service alongside Graf Zeppelin.

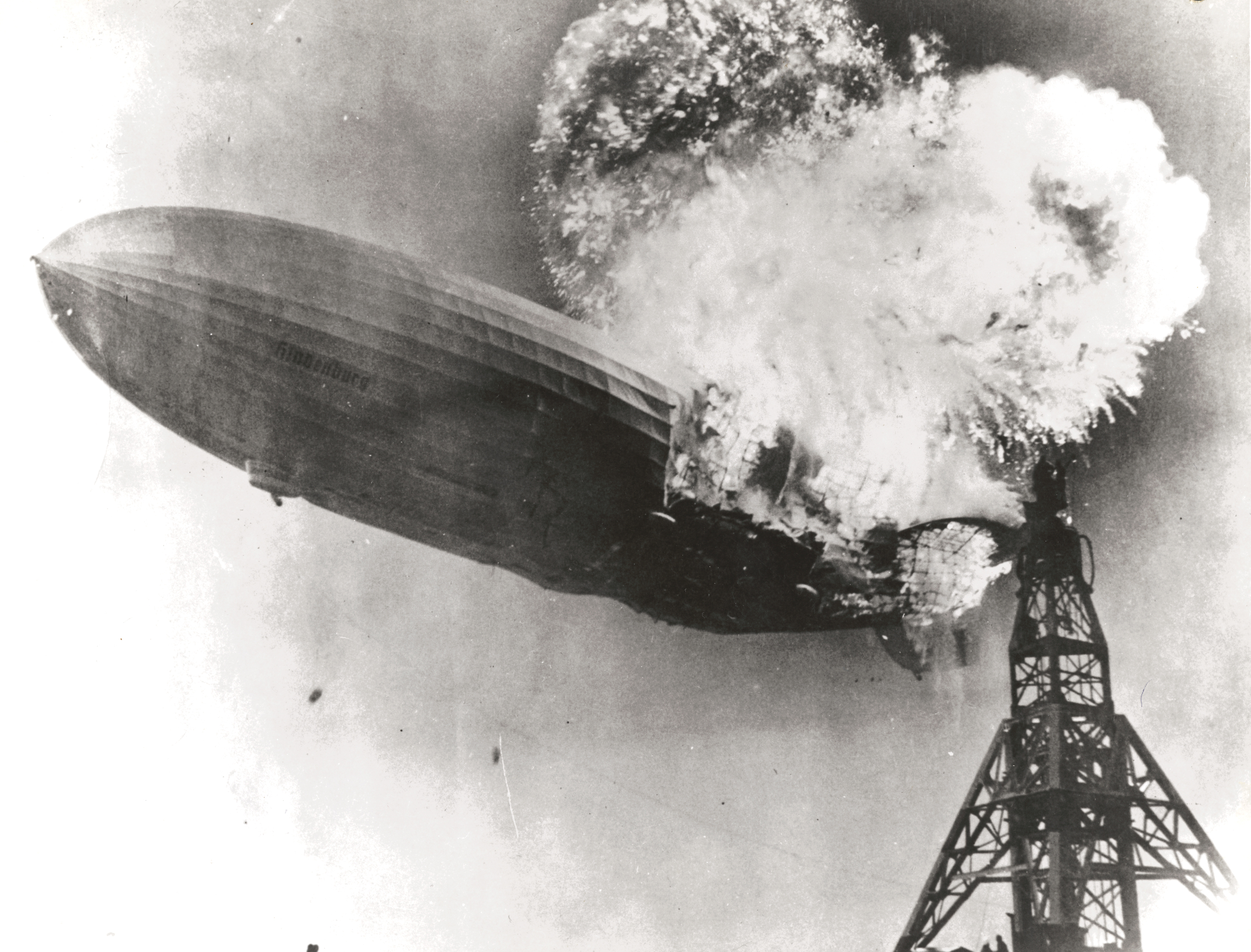
The Hindenburg on fire in 1937

On 6 May 1937, while landing in Lakehurst after a transatlantic flight, the tail of the ship caught fire, and within seconds, the Hindenburg burst into flames, killing 35 of the 97 people on board and one member of the ground crew. The cause of the fire was never definitively determined. The investigation into the accident concluded that static electricity had ignited hydrogen, which had leaked from the gasbags, although there were allegations of sabotage. 13 passengers and 22 crew, including Ernst Lehmann, were killed.

Despite the obvious danger, there remained a list of 400 people who still wanted to fly as Zeppelin passengers and had paid for the trip. Their money was refunded in 1940.

Graf Zeppelin was retired one month after the Hindenburg wreck and turned into a museum. A new intended flagship Zeppelin was completed in 1938 and, inflated with hydrogen, made some test flights (the first on 14 September), but never carried passengers. Another project, LZ 131, designed to be even larger than Hindenburg and Graf Zeppelin II, never progressed beyond the production of a few ring frames.

Graf Zeppelin II was assigned to the Luftwaffe and made about 30 test flights before the beginning of World War II. Most of those flights were carried out near the Polish border, first in the Sudeten mountains region of Silesia, then in the Baltic Sea region. During one such flight LZ 130 crossed the Polish border near the Hel Peninsula, where it was intercepted by a Polish Lublin R-XIII aircraft from Puck naval airbase and forced to leave Polish airspace. During this time, LZ 130 was used for electronic scouting missions, and was equipped with various measuring equipment. In August 1939, it made a flight near the coastline of Great Britain in an attempt to determine whether the 100 metre towers erected from Portsmouth to Scapa Flow were used for aircraft radio location.

Photography, radio wave interception, and magnetic and radio frequency analysis were unable to detect operational British Chain Home radar due to searching in the wrong frequency range. The frequencies searched were too high, an assumption based on the Germans' own radar systems. The mistaken conclusion was that the British towers were not connected with radar operations, but were for naval radio communications.

After the beginning of the Second World War on 1 September, the Luftwaffe ordered LZ 127 and LZ 130 move to a large Zeppelin hangar in Frankfurt, where the skeleton of LZ 131 was also located. In March 1940, Göring ordered the scrapping of the remaining airships, since the metal was needed to build airplanes for the Luftwaffe. On 6 May, following the completion of the scrapping of the airships, the Frankfurt hangars were demolished.

== Cultural influences ==
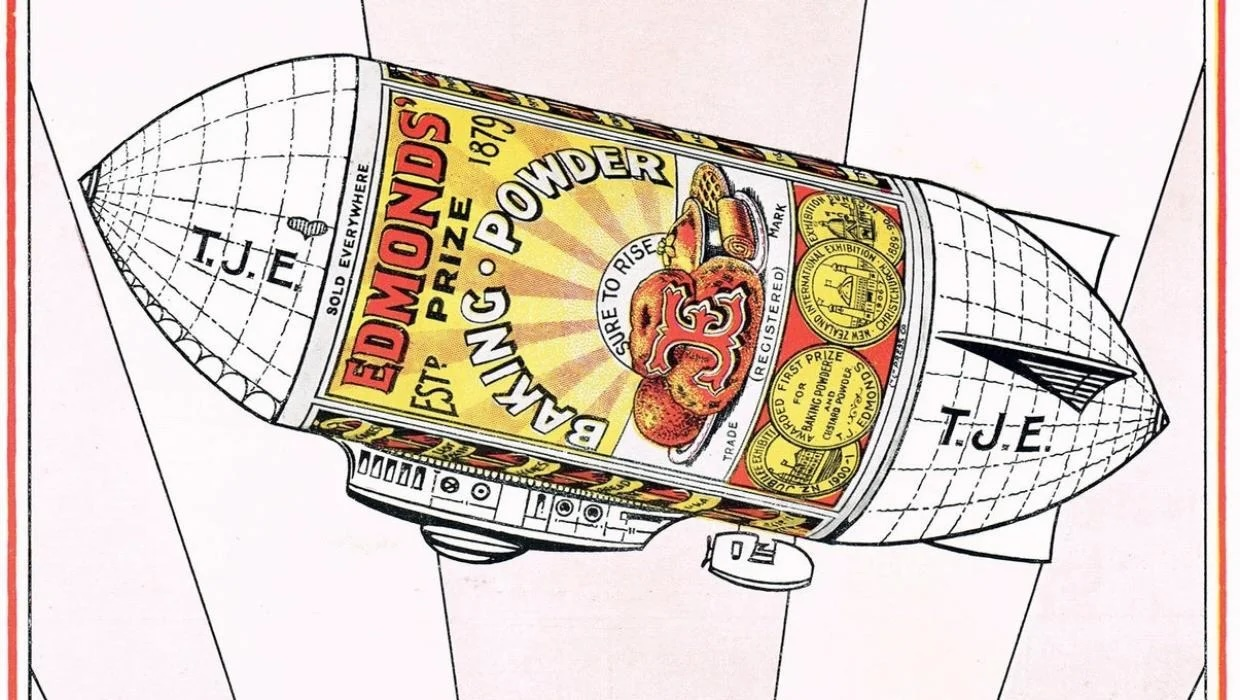
1928 advertisement depicting a tin of baking powder as a Zeppelin; the slogan of the brand was "Sure to Rise"

Zeppelins have been an inspiration to music, cinematography, and literature. The 1930 movie Hell's Angels, directed by Howard Hughes, features an unsuccessful Zeppelin raid on London during World War I. In 1934, the calypsonian Attila the Hun recorded "Graf Zeppelin", commemorating the airship's visit to Trinidad.

Zeppelins are often featured in alternate history and parallel universe fiction. They feature prominently in the popular fantasy novels of the His Dark Materials trilogy and The Book of Dust series by Philip Pullman. In the American science fiction series, Fringe, Zeppelins are a notable historical idiosyncrasy that helps differentiate the series' two parallel universes, also used in Doctor Who in the episodes "The Rise of the Cybermen" and "The Age of Steel" when the TARDIS crashes in an alternate reality where Britain is a 'People's Republic' and Pete Tyler, Rose Tyler's father, is alive and is a wealthy inventor.

They are seen in the alternate reality 1939 plot line in the film Sky Captain and the World of Tomorrow, and have an iconic association with the steampunk subcultural movement in broader terms. In 1989, Japanese animator Miyazaki released Kiki's Delivery Service, which features a Zeppelin as a plot element. A Zeppelin was used in Indiana Jones and the Last Crusade, when Jones and his father try to escape from Germany.

In 1968, English rock band Led Zeppelin chose their name after Keith Moon, drummer of The Who, told guitarist Jimmy Page that his idea to create a band would "go down like a lead balloon." (Note: Other versions have said The Who bassist Entwistle made the comment.) Page's manager Peter Grant suggested changing the spelling of "Lead" to "Led" to avoid mispronunciation. "Balloon" was replaced with "Zeppelin" as Jimmy Page saw it as a symbol of "the perfect combination of heavy and light, combustibility and grace." For the group's self-titled debut album, Page suggested the group use a picture of the Hindenburg crashing in New Jersey in 1937, much to Countess Eva von Zeppelin's disgust. Von Zeppelin tried to sue the group for using her family name, but the case was eventually dismissed.

== Modern era ==
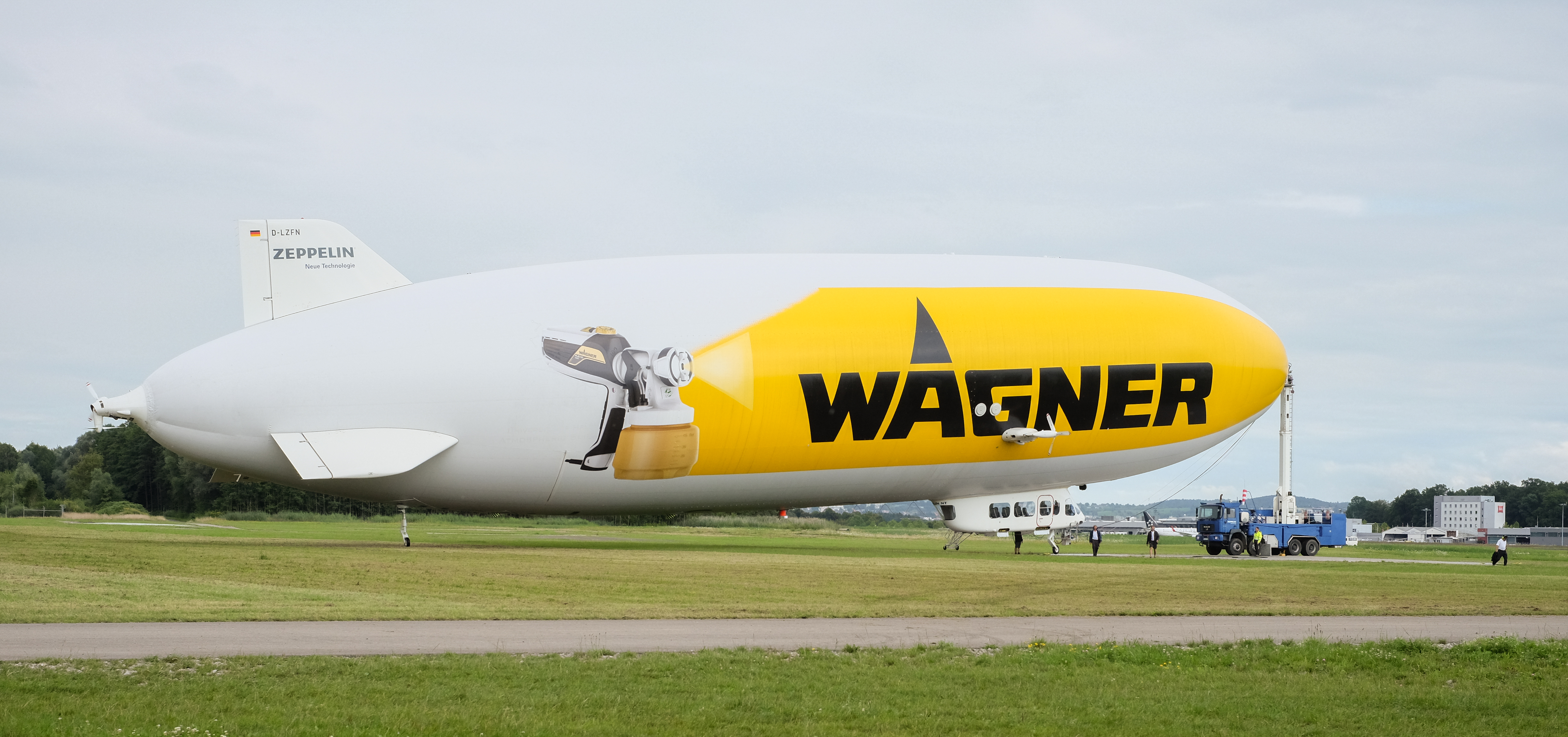
Zeppelin NT

Since the 1990s Luftschiffbau Zeppelin, a daughter enterprise of the Zeppelin conglomerate that built the original German Zeppelins, has been developing Zeppelin "New Technology" (NT) airships. These vessels are semi-rigid, based partly on internal pressure, partly on a frame.

The Airship Ventures company operated zeppelin passenger travel in California from October 2008 to November 2012 with one of these Zeppelin NT airships.

In May 2011, Goodyear announced that they would replace their fleet of blimps with Zeppelin NTs, resurrecting their partnership that ended over 70 years ago. Goodyear placed an order for three Zeppelin NTs, which then entered service between 2014 and 2018.

In October 2024, LTA Research performed the first test flight of Pathfinder 1, a fully rigid airship at Moffett Field in Mountain View, California. In that same month, they had the airship fly over San Francisco, California. On May 13, 2026, Pathfinder 1 flew near John Gomes Elementary School in Fremont, California.

Modern zeppelins are held aloft by the inert gas helium, eliminating the danger of combustion illustrated by the Hindenburg. It has been proposed that modern zeppelins could be powered by hydrogen fuel cells. Zeppelin NTs are often used for sightseeing trips; for example, D-LZZF (c/n 03) was used for Edelweiss's birthday celebration, performing flights over Switzerland in an Edelweiss livery, and it is now used, weather permitting, on flights over Munich. Zeppelin LZ N07-101s are used for sightseeing flights over Essen Friedrichshafen.

== See also ==
- Airship hangar
- Buoyancy compensator (aviation)
- Lane hydrogen producer
- List of airships of the United States Navy
- List of Schütte-Lanz airships
- List of Zeppelins
- Zeppelin Museum Friedrichshafen
