= Zeppelin LZ 14 =

LZ 14
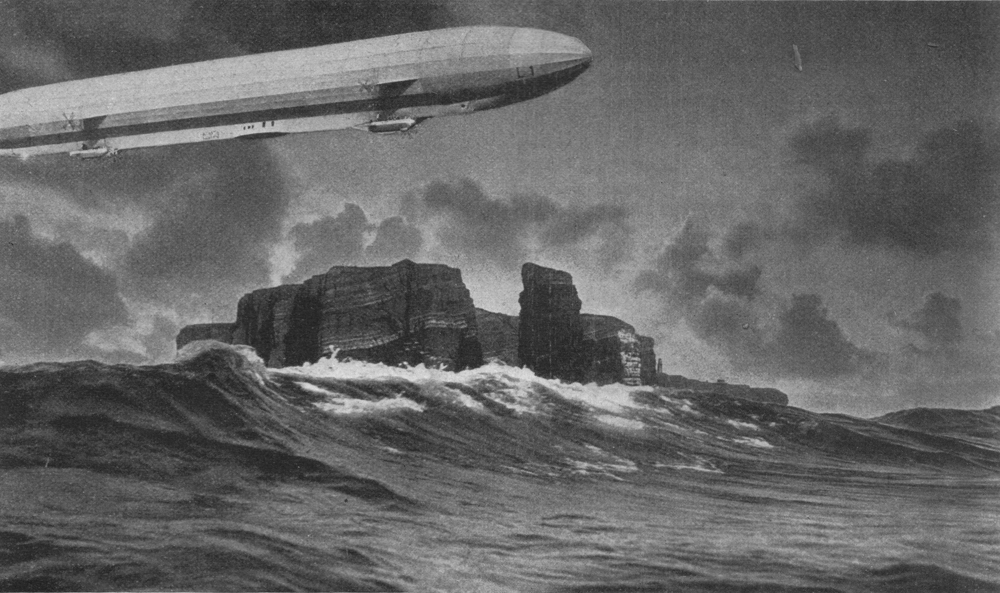
- LZ 14 over Helgoland

General information
- Type: H-class Rigid airship
- National origin: Imperial Germany
- Manufacturer: Zeppelin Luftschiffbau GmbH
- Designer: Ludwig Dürr
- Status: forced down in a thunderstorm in the North Sea
- Primary user: Kaiserliche Marine
- Number built: 1

History
- First flight: 7 October 1912
- Retired: 9 September 1913

Zeppelin LZ 14, given the navy tactical number L 1, was a rigid airship built for the Kaiserliche Marine (Imperial German Navy) to carry out reconnaissance over the North Sea and enemy territory. It was first flown on 7 October 1912. On 9 September 1913, LZ 14 was on a patrol over the North Sea when it encountered a thunderstorm, which resulted in a forced landing/crash. Fourteen crew-members drowned, becoming the world's first ever Zeppelin casualties.

== Specifications (LZ 14 / L 1) ==
Data from Zeppelin : rigid airships, 1893-1940

General characteristics

- Crew: 20
- Capacity: 8,200 kg (18,078 lb) typical disposable load
- Length: 158 m (518 ft 4 in)
- Diameter: 14.9 m (48 ft 11 in)
- Fineness ratio: 10.6
- Volume: 22,740 m^{3} (803,000 cu ft) in 18 gas cells
- Empty weight: 17,900 kg (39,463 lb)
- Useful lift: 26,100 kg (57,500 lb)
- Powerplant: 3 × Maybach BY 6-cylinder water-cooled in-line piston engines, 130 kW (180 hp) each
- Propellers: 2-bladed fixed-pitch propellers mounted on trusses on both sides, driven by chains

Performance

- Maximum speed: 76.32 km/h (47.42 mph, 41.21 kn)
- Range: 2,300 km (1,400 mi, 1,200 nmi)

Armament

- Guns: machine-guns in envelope, top gun positions, and gondolas

== See also ==
- Helgoland Island air disaster
- List of Zeppelins
