= Helgoland Island air disaster =

1913 air disaster

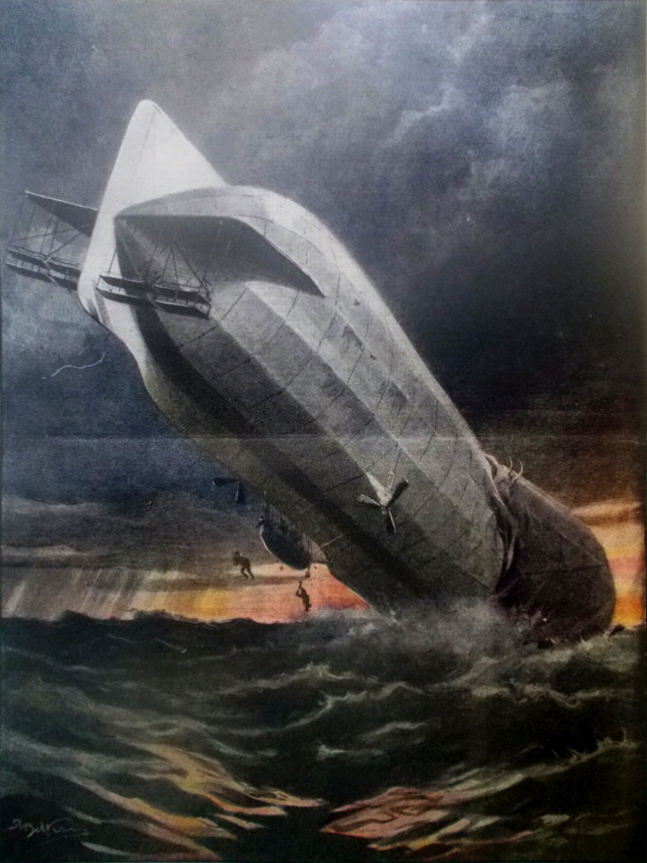
- Helgoland Island air disaster. Illustration by Achille Beltrame for the Italian publication La Domenica del Corriere, 28 September 1913

Accident
- Date: 9 September 1913
- Summary: Weather
- Site: North Sea, off Heligoland

Aircraft
- Aircraft type: Airship
- Aircraft name: LZ14 (manufacturer's designation)
- Operator: Imperial German Navy
- Registration: L 1 (military designation)
- Crew: 20
- Fatalities: 14
- Survivors: 6

The Helgoland Island air disaster occurred on 9 September 1913 after the airship Zeppelin LZ 14 had been transferred to the Imperial German Navy on 7 October 1912. As the first airship owned by the Navy, it was given the serial number L-1. Ordered to participate in manoeuvers, it departed the mainland in bad weather. With 20 people on board, L-1 flew into a gale, and, while 18 miles from its destination, the cold rain caused its gas to contract, causing it to settle 20 mi (32 km; 17 nmi) north of Helgoland into the North Sea, breaking in two. The control car sank, drowning 13 of its occupants. Seven were rescued by motor torpedo boats.

== See also ==
- List of Zeppelins
