= LZ 12 Sachsen =

1912 Zeppelin F-class airship

LZ 12 (Z III)
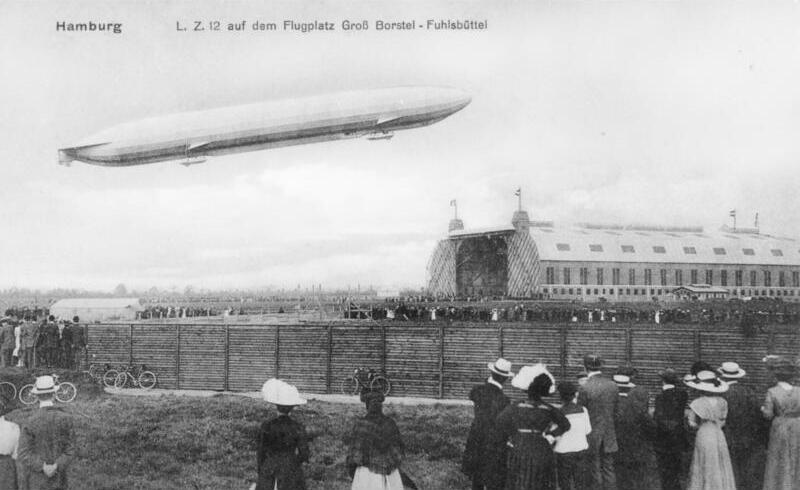

General information
- Type: Zeppelin Type F
- National origin: German Empire
- Manufacturer: Luftschiffbau Zeppelin
- Number built: 1

History
- First flight: 25 April 1912
- Retired: 14 August 1914 (destroyed at Metz-Frescaty)

LZ 12, also known as Z III in military service, was a German Zeppelin built in 1912. It was destroyed on the airfield at Metz-Frescaty on August 14, 1914 in one of the first aerial bombings of World War I.

== Historical background ==
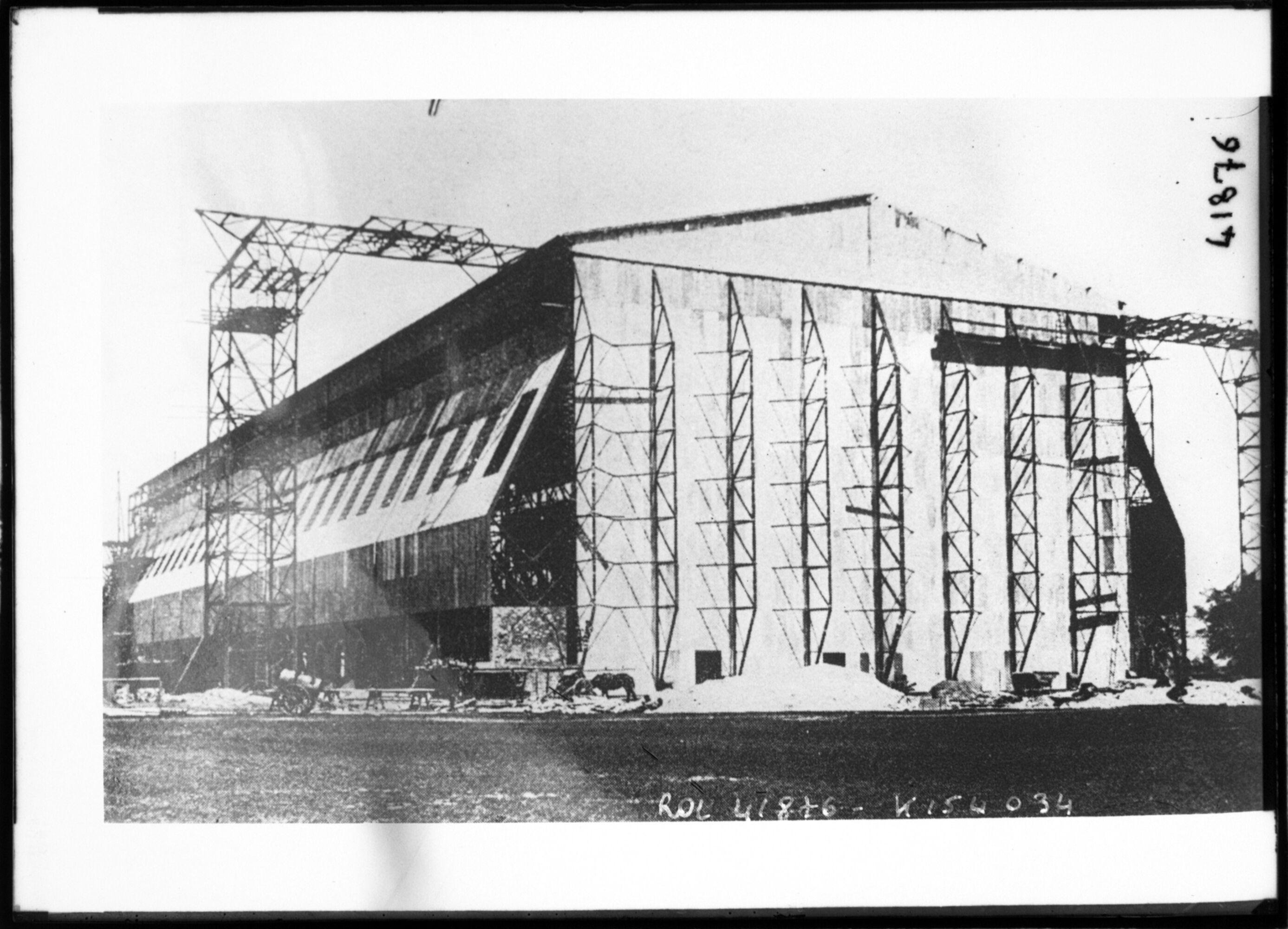
Airship hangar at Metz-Frescaty Air Base.

Zeppelins were used as bombers during World War I, although their effectiveness proved limited. At the beginning of the war, the German high command had high hopes for these airships, which were seen as superior to contemporary airplanes. While slightly slower, zeppelins could carry more armament, had greater bomb load capacity, and boasted superior range and endurance.

As of August 1, 1914, the German Empire possessed the most advanced fleet of rigid airships, including twelve military airships—nine of which were giant rigid zeppelins—primarily used by the Luftstreitkräfte. Additionally, around a dozen civilian zeppelins were in the process of being militarized. However, these theoretical technological and strategic advantages did not translate into practical success.

== Technical specifications ==
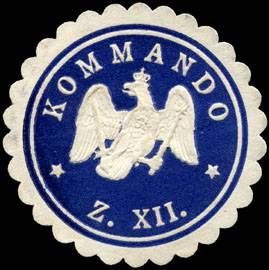

The LZ 12 was a rigid airship of German design, built under the supervision of Count Ferdinand von Zeppelin in 1912. Its military designation in the Imperial German Army was Z III, and it should not be confused with LZ 3, whose operational name was Z I and which entered service in 1906.

The LZ 12 measured 140 metres (460 ft) in length, 14 metres (46 ft) in width, with a gas volume of 17,800 cubic metres (630,000 cu ft).

== Operational history ==
The LZ 12 made its first flight on April 25, 1912. It was decommissioned on August 1, 1914 and subsequently destroyed at Metz-Frescaty Air Base during one of the first aerial bombardments of World War I.

In August 1914, French aviators flying out of Nancy and Verdun began bombing raids against the Metz-Frescaty airfield. On August 14, 1914, hangars housing the zeppelins Ersatz Z II and Z III were bombed. The resulting fire destroyed both airships, which had just been decommissioned due to obsolescence.

== Sources ==
- Robinson, Douglas H., Giants in the Sky, Henley-on-Thames: Foulis, 1973.
