= Friedrichshafen FF.19 =

WW1 German maritime reconnaissance floatplane

FF.19
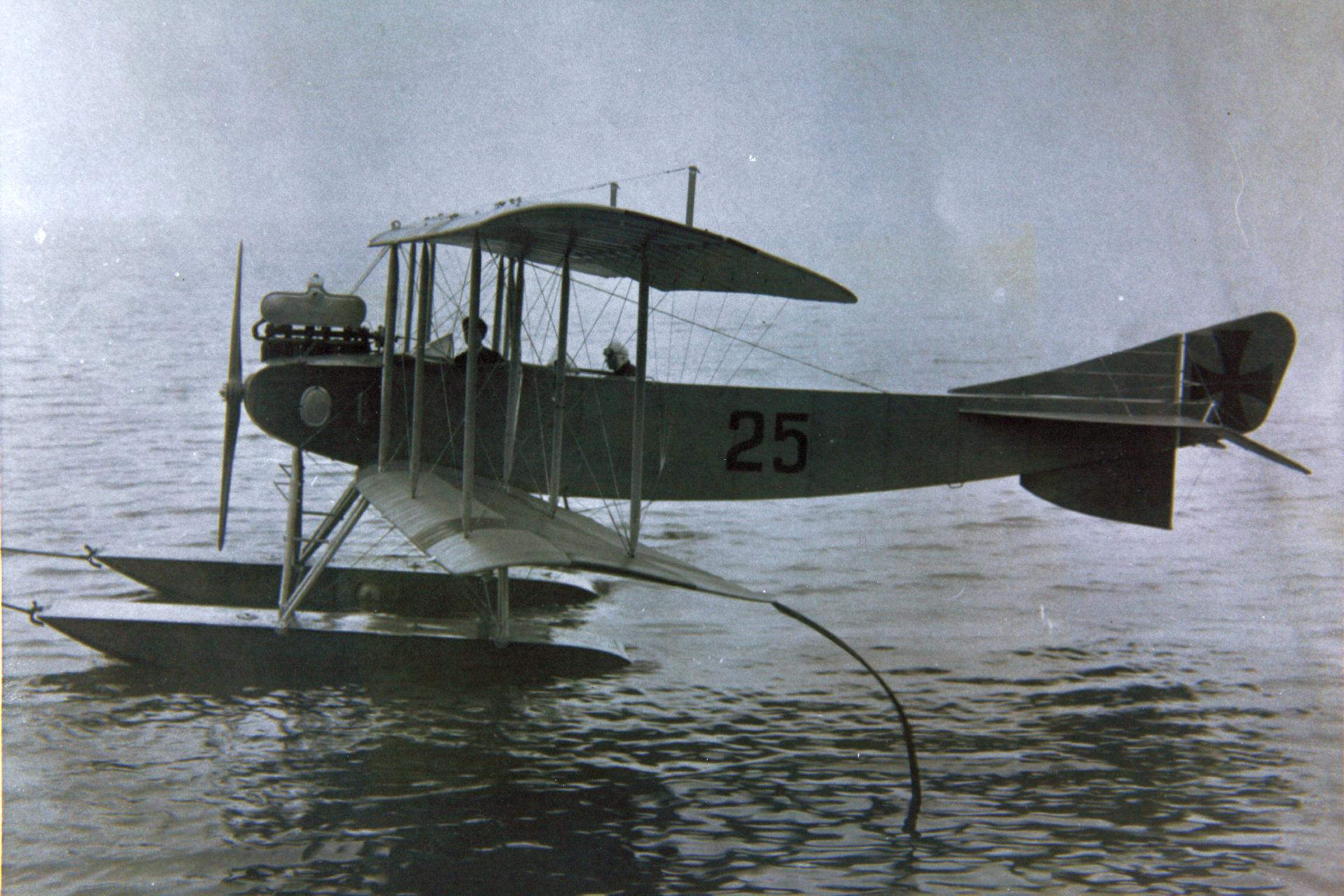
- A side view of the first FF.19

General information
- Type: Maritime reconnaissance floatplane
- Manufacturer: Flugzeugbau Friedrichshafen
- Primary user: German Imperial Navy
- Number built: 16

History
- Introduction date: 1914
- First flight: April 1914
- Developed into: Friedrichshafen FF.29

The Friedrichshafen FF.19 was an unarmed maritime reconnaissance floatplane built for the Imperial German Navy's (Kaiserliche Marine) Naval Air Service (Marine-Fliegerabteilung) that was produced by Flugzeugbau Friedrichshafen. Built in small numbers, the aircraft first flew in 1914 and saw service during the early months of World War I, mostly conducting maritime patrols over the North Sea, although they did attack British ships participating in the Raid on Cuxhaven at the end of the year.

== Background and description ==
The German Naval Air Service was impressed by a demonstration of the British Avro 503 single-engined floatplane in 1913 and bought the prototype. It then ordered a batch of five aircraft, plus one airframe for static testing, of similar performance and configuration in February 1914. The first airframe completed passed the static load requirement on 2 May when its wing failed at a loading of 7.02 times the force of gravity (g)s.

The FF.19 was a two-seat biplane with a water-cooled 100 PS (74 kW) Mercedes D.I straight-six engine mounted at the front of the fuselage. The two forward floats were attached to the fuselage by four pairs of V-shaped struts while the third float was connected directly to the tail structure. The wings were connected with six sets of interplane struts that gave the aircraft a three-bay configuration. It was unarmed, although some small bombs could be stored in the observer's cockpit.

== Operational history ==
The first batch of aircraft were delivered in May–June 1914 and the FF.19 became the first German aircraft to conduct successful tests with wireless telegraphy. When World War I began in August, the five Friedrichshafens and three AGO floatplanes were the only combat-worthy aircraft in the Naval Air Service. A batch of 10 more floatplanes was ordered shortly after the start of the war and were delivered beginning in September through November. The FF.19's activities during the war are not well documented, but one aircraft was interned by the Dutch after it was forced to make an emergency landing near the island of Schiermonnikoog on 14 August. (Note: The aircraft received the serial number R-1 when the Netherlands Naval Aviation Service was formed in 1917.)

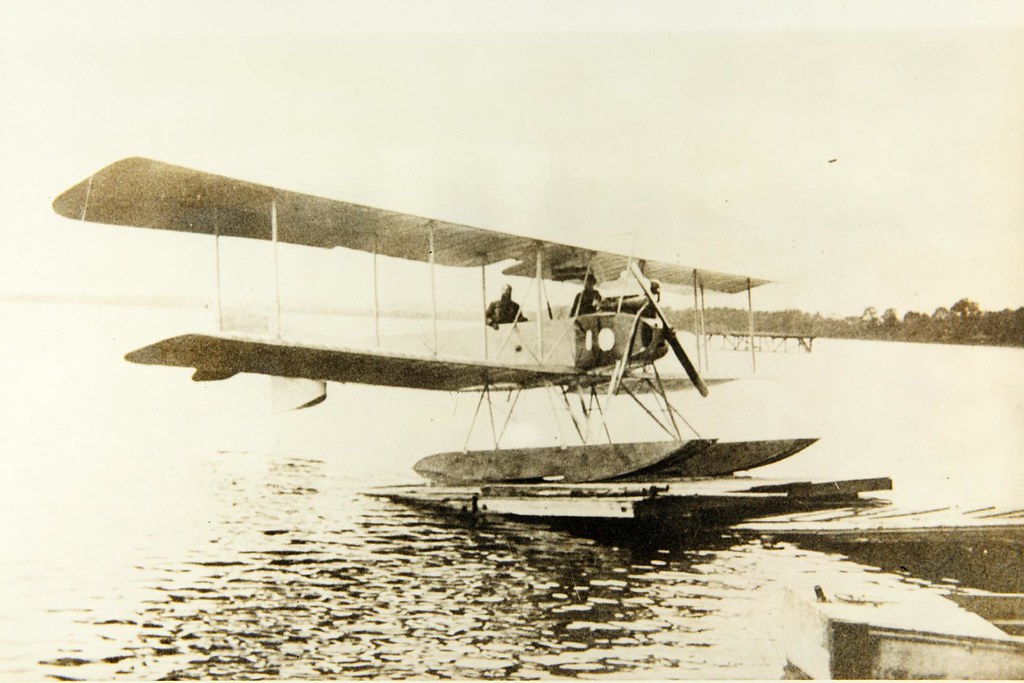
An oblique view of a FF.19

Several months later the British made their second attempt to attack the Zeppelin sheds that the Royal Navy believed to be at Cuxhaven (Note: They were actually at Nordholz Naval Airbase, 8 miles (13 km) south of Cuxhaven.) on 24 November. Unlike the attempt the previous month which had been cancelled because of foul weather, the aerial attack on the Zeppelin base by the aircraft of the seaplane carriers of the Harwich Force was intended to bait the High Seas Fleet to sortie into the North Sea where they could be destroyed by the waiting Grand Fleet. The British ships had departed their bases on 23 November, but the aerial portion of the operation was cancelled on the evening of 23/24 November because the German battlecruisers were in the German Bight and the three seaplane carriers returned to port. The other ships continued on their mission with the Grand Fleet covering the Harwich Force as it sailed within visual distance of the island of Heligoland. Two seaplanes based on the island took off in response, although one was forced to return with engine trouble; the other aircraft, a FF.19, unsuccessfully attacked the light cruiser HMS Liverpool with five bombs before the British returned to base.

The British returned for another try the following month with the carriers to be in a position north-east of Heligoland to hoist out their floatplanes on the morning of 25 December. The Germans had been alerted to the possibility of an imminent attack on their North Sea ports and were launching Zeppelins to search for any attackers that morning. A FF.19 on patrol spotted the Harwich Force after they had begun to move westward and had to return to Heligoland to deliver its report since it lacked a radio. The base alerted L.6 via searchlight to the presence of the British ships. As the Zeppelin attempted to close the range on the British, the carrier Empress, the slowest of the carriers, was lagging behind. It was unsuccessfully attacked by a FF.19 with six 4.5-kilogram (9.9 lb) bombs from an altitude of about 2,000 feet (610 m) and then by a Friedrichshafen FF.29 with two 10-kilogram (22 lb) bombs that landed closer, but failed to inflict any damage before the airship could attack.

Later that morning, after the carrier Riviera had recovered the only aircraft to return to the carriers, the Harwich Force was again attacked by FF.19s from Heligoland. One aircraft dropped five bombs on destroyers and the other attacked a cruiser with two bombs, none of which hit their targets. During this operation one FF.19 remained airborne for five hours and 52 minutes.

== Operators ==
German Empire

- Imperial German Navy

== Specifications ==
Data from Friedrichshafen Aircraft of WWI: A Centennial Perspective on Great War Airplanes; Flugzeugbau Friedrichshafen GmbH: Diplom-Ingenieur Theodor Kober

General characteristics

- Length: 10.4 m (34 ft 1 in)
- Upper wingspan: 15.3 m (50 ft 2 in)
- Lower wingspan: 13.8 m (45 ft 3 in)
- Wing area: 48 m^{2} (520 sq ft)
- Empty weight: 860 kg (1,896 lb)
- Gross weight: 1,160 kg (2,557 lb)
- Powerplant: 1 × Mercedes D.I water-cooled straight-six engine, 75 kW (100 hp) Originally measured as 100 PS (74 kW)
- Propellers: 2-bladed

Performance

- Maximum speed: 95 km/h (59 mph, 51 kn)
- Cruise speed: 85 km/h (53 mph, 46 kn)
- Time to altitude: 500 m (1,600 ft) in 8 minutes

== See also ==
Related development

- Friedrichshafen FF.29

Related lists

- List of military aircraft of Germany
- List of flying boats and floatplanes

== Bibliography ==
- Borzutzki, Siegfried (1993). Flugzeugbau Friedrichshafen GmbH: Diplom-Ingenieur Theodor Kober [Friedrichshafen Aircraft Company: Diploma-Engineer Theodore Kober] (in German). Berlin: Burbach. ISBN 3-927513-60-1.
- Castle, Ian (2011). The Zeppelin Base Raids, Germany 1914. Oxford. ISBN 978-1-84908-244-0.
- Herris, Jack (2016). Friedrichshafen Aircraft of WWI: A Centennial Perspective on Great War Airplanes. Great War Aviation Centennial Series. Vol. 21. n.p.: Aeronaut Books. ISBN 978-1-935881-35-3.
- Klaauw, Bart van der (March–April 1999). "Unexpected Windfalls: Accidentally or Deliberately, More than 100 Aircraft 'Arrived' in Dutch Territory During the Great War". Air Enthusiast (80): 54–59. ISSN 0143-5450.
- Layman, R. D. (1985). The Cuxhaven Raid: The World's First Carrier Air Strike. London: Conway. ISBN 0-85177-327-3.
