= LZ4 =

LZ4 may refer to:

== Transportation ==
- LZ 4 (Luftschiff Zeppelin 4), a German experimental airship
- LZ4, a GM High Value engine
- SpaceX Landing Zone 4, located at SLC-4 West, at Vandenberg Air Force Base Space Launch Complex 4

== Other uses ==
- LZ4 (compression algorithm), a lossless data compression algorithm
- 24944 Harish-Chandra, a main-belt asteroid formerly called 1997 LZ4
- Led Zeppelin IV, an album by Led Zeppelin
