= Friedrichshafen FF.29 =

German maritime reconnaissance floatplane

FF.29
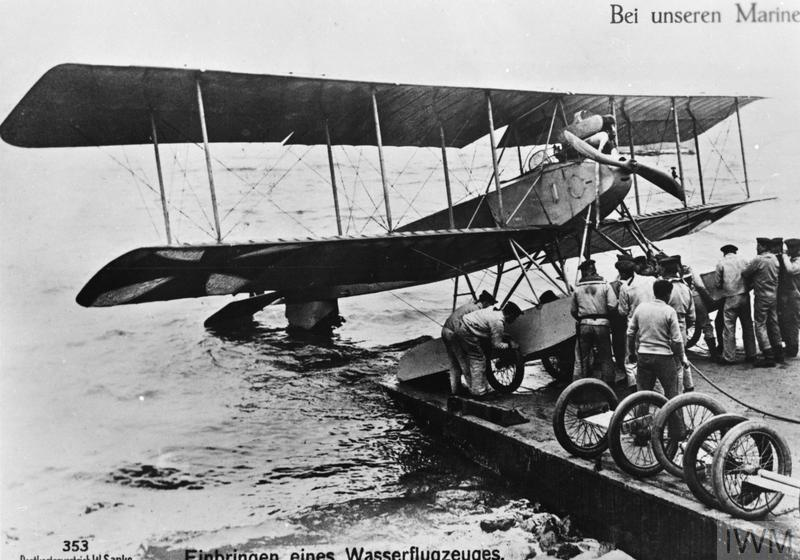
- A German postcard of a FF.29 having beaching trolleys installed underneath its floats

General information
- Type: Maritime reconnaissance floatplane
- Manufacturer: Flugzeugbau Friedrichshafen
- Primary user: Imperial German Navy
- Number built: 49

History
- Introduction date: December 1914
- First flight: November 1914
- Developed from: Friedrichshafen FF.19

The Friedrichshafen FF.29 was a maritime reconnaissance floatplane built for the Imperial German Navy's (Kaiserliche Marine) Naval Air Service (Marine-Fliegerabteilung) that was produced by Flugzeugbau Friedrichshafen during World War I. The aircraft entered service in November 1914, mostly conducting maritime patrols over the North Sea and the English Channel, and played a small role in the Raid on Cuxhaven the following month. A FF.29 became the first aircraft to be transported by a submarine when it was used in experiments in January 1915. In May an emergency landing by a FF.29 was the cause of the action off Noordhinder Bank when German forces were searching for the floatplane when they encountered a superior British force. The aircraft was also involved in developing methods of controlling artillery fire from the air.

FF.29s were interned by both Denmark and the Netherlands, both of which were neutral powers during World War I. The Danes built five copies for their own use.

== Background and description ==
The German Naval Air Service was pleased with the performance of the Friedrichshafen FF.19 floatplane and ordered a batch of 20 improved versions of the aircraft as the FF.29 from Flugzeugbau Friedrichshafen on 15 August 1914, a few weeks after the beginning of World War I. The primary difference between the two was that the FF.29 had a greater wingspan than the earlier aircraft and a larger wing. It also used the more powerful water-cooled 120 PS (88 kW) Mercedes D.II straight-six engine. The aircraft made its first flight in November and when the Naval Air Service went to order more that same month, it had difficulties procuring enough engines because the Imperial German Army's Air Serviceto (Fliegertruppen) had a higher priority for the Mercedes engines. The navy was able to place an order with Friedrichshafen for five FF.29s with the D.II engine, but was forced to substitute the 120 PS Argus As II engine in the other seven aircraft. It also placed an order for fifteen FF.29As license-built by the Wilhelmshaven Imperial Shipyard (Kaiserliche Werft Wilhelmshaven) equipped with the same 100 PS (74 kW) Mercedes D.I engine as used in the FF.19. Three of these FF.29As were later cancelled, making a total of forty-four German-built FF.29s of both types completed, with the last aircraft delivered in September 1915.

The FF.29 was a two-seat biplane with the engine positioned at the front of the fuselage. The two forward floats were attached to the fuselage by four pairs of V-shaped struts while the third float was connected directly to the tail structure. The wings were connected with six sets of interplane struts that gave the aircraft a three-bay configuration. The floatplane was unarmed, although some small bombs could be stored in the observer's cockpit.

== Operational history ==
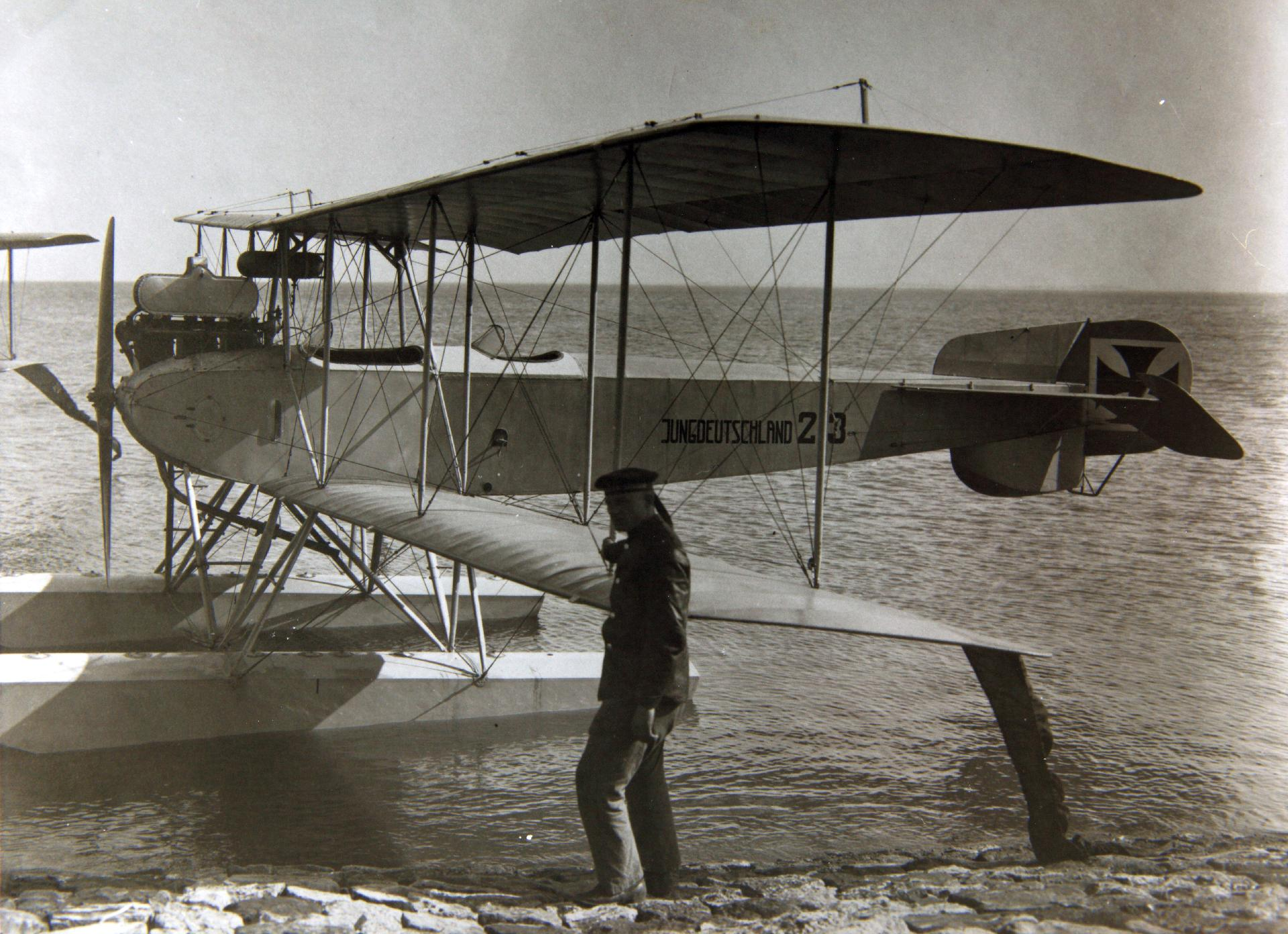
A closeup view of a FF.29

Four FF.29s were delivered to the Naval Air Service in November 1914; two of these were delivered to the newly established Naval Air Station Flanders I (Seeflugstation Flandern I, SFS I) at Zeebrugge in Occupied Belgium in early December and another was operational at the base on the island of Heligoland. The Zeebrugge pair made their first operational maritime reconnaissance patrol off the coast of Dunkirk, France, on 14 December. One aircraft made the type's first reconnaissance of the English coast on 25 December; engine problems forced an emergency landing in the Thames Estuary after having flown over Gravesend, Chatham, and having dropped a pair of 5 kg (11 lb) bombs over Sheerness to no effect. The crew was able to take off again, but was soon forced to land again. Unable to take off because of damaged floats, the aircraft taxied across the North Sea for hours before exhausting its fuel and finally drifting ashore near German-controlled Wenduine, Belgium. As the war progressed more than one FF.29 had to taxi back to friendly territory.

Further to the northeast that same day, the Royal Navy made its third attempt to bomb the Zeppelin sheds that it believed to be near Cuxhaven. The aerial attack on the Zeppelin base by the aircraft of the seaplane carriers of the Harwich Force was intended to bait the German High Seas Fleet to sortie into the North Sea where they could be destroyed by the waiting Grand Fleet. The British had departed port earlier so that the carriers would be in a position north-east of Heligoland to hoist out their floatplanes on the morning of 25 December. The Germans had been alerted to the possibility of an imminent attack on their North Sea ports and were launching Zeppelins to search for any attackers that morning. A FF.19 on patrol spotted the Harwich Force after they had flown off their aircraft and begun to move westward and had to return to Heligoland to deliver its report since it lacked a radio. The base alerted L.6 via searchlight to the presence of the British ships. As the Zeppelin attempted to close the range on the British, the carrier Empress, the slowest of the carriers, was lagging behind. It was unsuccessfully attacked by a FF.19 with six 4.5-kilogram (9.9 lb) bombs from an altitude of about 2,000 feet (610 m) and then by a FF.29 from 1,800 feet (550 m) with two 10-kilogram (22 lb) bombs that landed closer, but failed to inflict any damage.

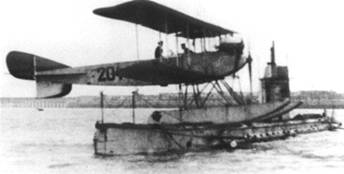
The German submarine U-12 with a FF.29 on deck, 15 January 1915

On 9 January 1915 a FF.29 "shot down" an unarmed Belgian Blériot XI on a reconnaissance mission over Zeebrugge. The observer aboard the floatplane was armed with a carbine with five shots. While it is unknown if he took any shots at the enemy aircraft, the Blériot had engine problems over the port and was forced to make an emergency landing and was captured intact. Later that month the same FF.29 participated in experiments to extend the floatplane's range by transporting it aboard a submarine closer to its operational area. The captain of SM U-12, Lieutenant (Kapitänleutnant) Walther Forstmann, submerged his boat just enough to allow the FF.29 to taxi over his forward hull and then blew his ballast tanks to raise the floatplane out of the water. The first attempt in Zeebrugge harbor was successful as was the next test outside the harbor. On 15 January, the U-boat sailed for the North Sea with the aircraft aboard for a more realistic test. The water was choppy enough that after an hour's steaming the pilot, Lieutenant (Oberleutnant zur See) Friedrich von Arnauld de la Perière, and Forstmann were worried that the FF.29's floats would be damaged, so they decided to cut the mission short and U-12 submerged so the floatplane could conduct its intended reconnaissance of the Kentish coast. This was the first case of transporting an aircraft by submarine.

The next month a FF.29 was used to control the gunfire of coast-defense guns emplaced on the Belgian coast to protect against British raids and bombardments. None of the aircraft at Zeebrugge were equipped with a radio, so a system using flares and signal lamps had to be developed to allow the aircraft to communicate with the artillery battery. As of 12 March, SFS I had five FF.29s on hand. The following day, while returning from a reconnaissance patrol over the English Channel and bombing some paddle steamers at Dunkirk, the crew of a FF.29 got disoriented and landed in Dutch territorial waters near Terneuzen. They realized their mistake after talking to some nearby locals and were able to push off from the beach with their help and return to Zeebrugge. On 2 April, a FF.29 spotted three enemy destroyers closing on a German submarine and three trawlers who were unaware of their approach. The floatplane landed next to SM U-28 and was able to pass a message to the submarine's captain who warned the trawlers via signal light. The floatplane then took off and escorted the ships away from the destroyers.

On the first day of May, two FF.29s spotted four British trawlers near the Noordhinder Bank, north of Ostend, but the engine of one of the floatplanes broke a crankshaft and it had to land. The other aircraft's engine broke a valve spring shortly afterwards, before the FF.29 could pick up the other aircraft's crew. The floatplane still flying had to return to base for repairs and dropped a message to a pair of torpedo boats giving the downed FF.29's location. While searching for the floatplane, the torpedo boats encountered the trawlers, sinking one of them, but were sunk themselves by four nearby British destroyers. While this was going on the FF.29's crew was rescued by a Dutch ship. Six days later a pair of British destroyers attempted to bombard Zeebrugge. While evading return fire one of the destroyers struck a naval mine and sank. Two FF.29s took off to investigate the strength of the attacking force and the surviving destroyer broke off its rescue efforts and left the scene when it spotted the floatplanes. One aircraft followed it while the other one led German trawlers to the area to the rescue the remaining survivors.

By the beginning of December SFS I had only a single FF.29 on strength. One aircraft was shot down by British ships on 1 March 1916 and the last FF.29 based at Zeebrugge crashed on 23 May.

=== Foreign service ===
A FF.29 was interned by the Dutch on 21 November 1915; the aircraft received the serial number S-1 when the Netherlands Naval Aviation Service was formed in 1917. Another FF.29 was interned in Danish waters in 1917. It was disassembled for use as a pattern aircraft and a copy was built as the Mågen 17 by the Airplane Construction Shop of the Naval Shipyard (Orlogsværftet Flyvemaskineværksted). Comparative trials were conducted between the floatplane and the Donnet-Leveque flying boats in Danish service. The Mågen 17 had the best performance and four modified aircraft were built as the HB.I with more powerful engines.

== Variants ==
FF.29: Main production version, 32 built by Flugzeugbau Friedrichshafen with either the Mercedes D.II or Argus As II engine.

FF.29A: Twelve aircraft built by Kaiserliche Werft Wilhelmshaven with a 100 PS (74 kW) Mercedes D.I engine and modified floats and tail surfaces.

Mågen 17: One aircraft built by the Danish Orlogsværftet Flyvemaskineværksted.

Orlogsværftet HB.I: Four copies of the Mågen 17 built by the Orlogsværftet Flyvemaskineværksted, initially fitted with either 160 PS (120 kW) Curtiss or 150 PS (110 kW) Benz Bz.III engines, but were re-equipped with 160 PS Orlogsværftet O-V engines from 1921.

== Operators ==
Denmark

- Royal Danish Navy

German Empire

- Imperial German Navy

Netherlands

- Royal Netherlands Navy

== Specifications (FF.29) ==
Data from Friedrichshafen Aircraft of WWI: A Centennial Perspective on Great War Airplanes; Flugzeugbau Friedrichshafen GmbH: Diplom-Ingenieur Theodor Kober

General characteristics

- Length: 10.4 m (34 ft 1 in)
- Wingspan: 16.3 m (53 ft 6 in)
- Wing area: 57.5 m^{2} (619 sq ft)
- Empty weight: 928 kg (2,046 lb)
- Gross weight: 1,400 kg (3,086 lb)
- Powerplant: 1 × water-cooled Mercedes D.II straight-six engine , 89 kW (120 hp) Originally measured as 120 PS (88 kW)

== See also ==
Related lists

- List of military aircraft of Germany
- List of flying boats and floatplanes

== Bibliography ==
- Borzutzki, Siegfried (1993). Flugzeugbau Friedrichshafen GmbH: Diplom-Ingenieur Theodor Kober [Friedrichshafen Aircraft Company: Diploma-Engineer Theodore Kober] (in German). Berlin: Burbach. ISBN 3-927513-60-1.
- Castle, Ian (2011). The Zeppelin Base Raids, Germany 1914. Oxford. ISBN 978-1-84908-244-0.
- Herris, Jack (2016). Friedrichshafen Aircraft of WWI: A Centennial Perspective on Great War Airplanes. Great War Aviation Centennial Series. Vol. 21. n.p.: Aeronaut Books. ISBN 978-1-935881-35-3.
- Klaauw, Bart van der (March–April 1999). "Unexpected Windfalls: Accidentally or Deliberately, More than 100 Aircraft 'Arrived' in Dutch Territory During the Great War". Air Enthusiast (80): 54–59. ISSN 0143-5450.
- Layman, R. D. (1985). The Cuxhaven Raid: The World's First Carrier Air Strike. London: Conway. ISBN 0-85177-327-3.
- Schmeelke, Michael (2018). Zeebrugge: Naval Air Station Flanders I 1914–1918. Reno, Nevada: Aeronaut Books. ISBN 978-1-935881-46-9.
