= Zeppelin LZ 5 =

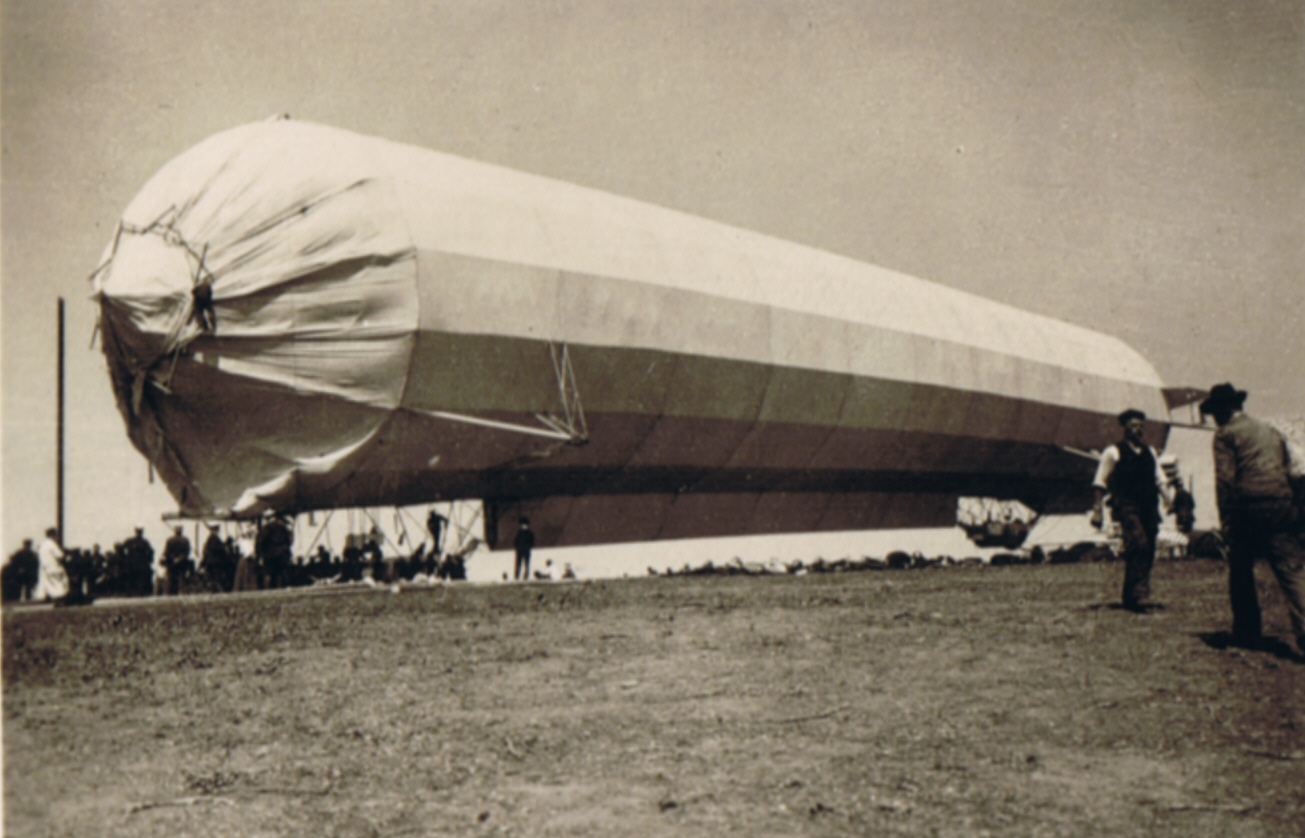
- LZ 5 after hasty repairs from colliding with a pear tree in 1909.

General information
- Type: Type c experimental military rigid airship
- National origin: Imperial Germany
- Manufacturer: Luftschiffbau Zeppelin
- Designer: Ferdinand von Zeppelin
- Status: Destroyed in crash
- Primary user: Imperial German Navy
- Number built: 1

History
- First flight: 26 May 1909
- Retired: 24 April 1910

The Zeppelin LZ 5, tactical number Z II, was a German experimental military rigid airship constructed under the direction of Ferdinand von Zeppelin. After having made numerous successful trips, LZ 5 broke loose from its moorings in a storm and subsequentely crashed on 24 April 1910.

== Construction ==
LZ 5 was a C-Class zeppelin built by Luftschiffbau Zeppelin in Manzell near Friedrichshafen, Germany. It was laid down in 1908 and completed by 26 May 1909. The airship measured 136 m (446 ft) in length and had a diameter of 13 m (43 ft). It was equipped with two Daimler engines, producing 105 hp and 77 kW each. The airship could reach a speed of 13.5m/s (48.6 km/h) and a maximum height of 1,250 m (4,100 ft). LZ 5 had a gas volume of 15,000 m³ of hydrogen contained in the envelope of the airship. Its framework was made of the light alloy aluminium and covered by fabric skin. It was equipped with two gondolas and could carry a crew of eight.

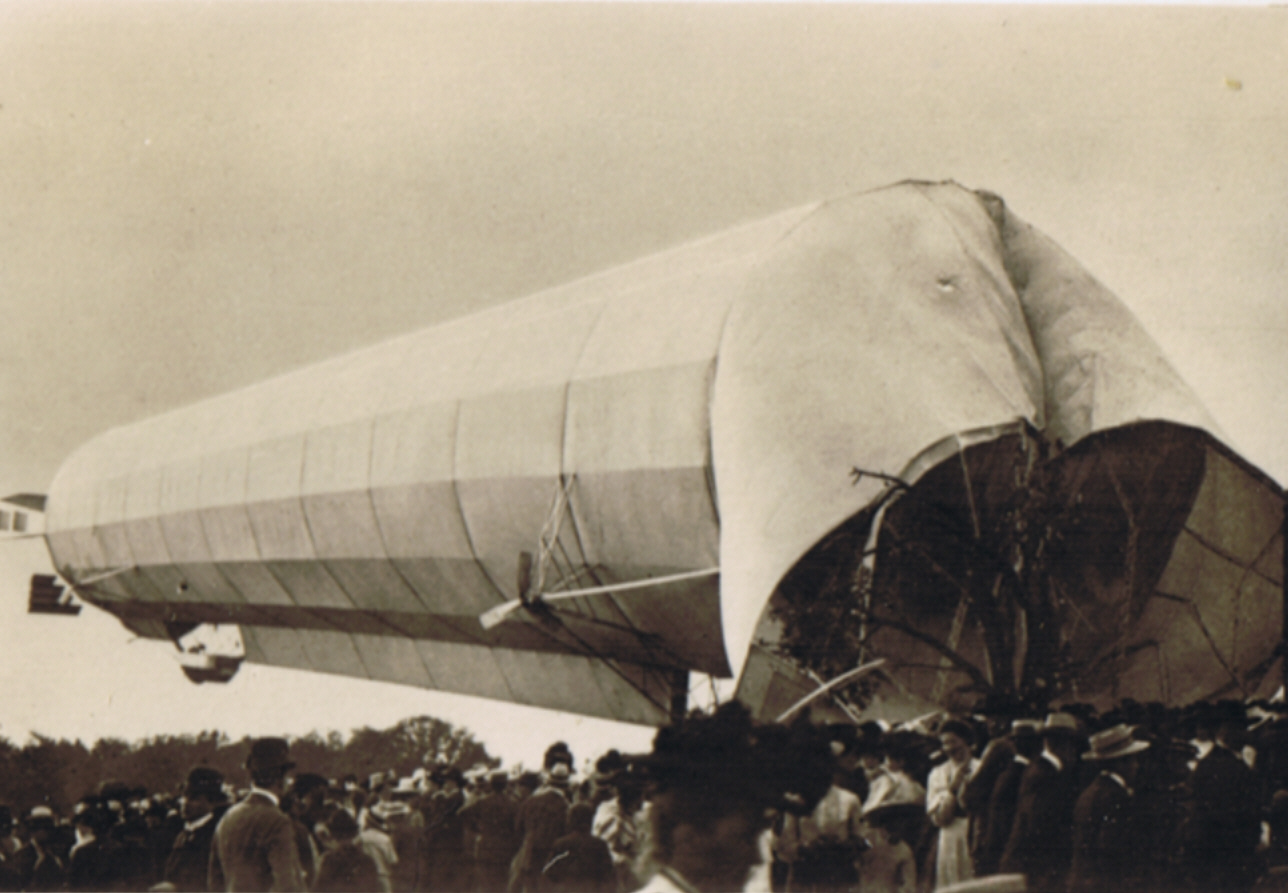
LZ 5 after colliding with a pear tree near Göppingen, Germany in 1909.

== Career ==
LZ 5 conducted its first flight on 26 May 1909 at Lake Constance, Germany. It subsequently made a successful endurance journey from 29 May to 2 June 1909 under the command of Ludwig Dürr and carrying Ferdinand von Zeppelin and six of his employees, travelling the long distance between Lake Constance and Bitterfeld, Germany and back. Its initial goal had been to reach Berlin, but due to fuel shortage and strong headwinds, the airship had to turn back. In total LZ 5 flew for 1,194 km in 38 hours and 40 minutes. However a small incident occurred during this flight, when the airship collided with a pear tree near Göppingen, Germany, rupturing three gas cells. The damage was quickly repaired with hop sticks and after Captain Dürr returned to the repaired ship after having gone off to buy a chocolate bar, the airship made it back to Lake Constance without further incident.

After LZ 5 was fully repaired, it was sold to the military administration in Cologne, Germany on 5 August 1909 and renamed Z II. During the airship's relocation from Lake Constance to Cologne for its military service, it was displayed at the International Aviation Exhibition in Frankfurt am Main, Germany. During its time in the army, Z II made a total of 16 more flights, covering a total distance of 2,478 km.

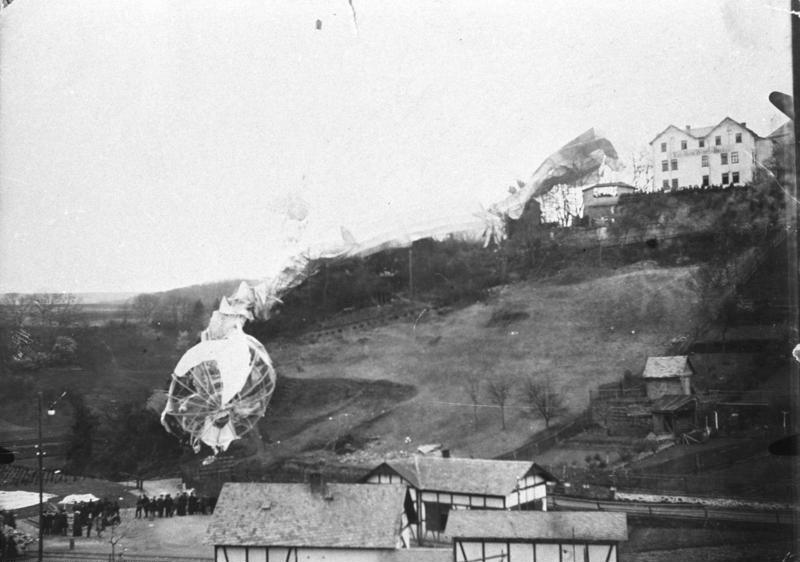
Wreck of the LZ 5 in Weilburg, Germany in 1910

== Loss ==
On 24 April 1910 Z II was travelling from Bad Homburg, Germany to Cologne, Germany when a powerful storm arose, forcing the airship to land in an open field near Limburg an der Lahn, Germany. The airship was moored to a large farm trailer from the nearby Blumenrod farm, but the strong winds managed to break Z II loose from its moorings, after which it drifted for some distance without crew. The airship ultimately crashed into a hill named Webersberg near Weilburg, Germany. The crash had broken the airship in two and it was deemed a total loss. Z II was scrapped on site and 22 commemorative medals were minted from aluminium debris that was salvaged during the scrapping of the airship.

== Specifications ==
Data from

General characteristics

- Length: 136 m (446 ft 2 in)
- Diameter: 13 m (42 ft 8 in)
- Volume: 15,000 m^{3} (530,000 cu ft)
- Powerplant: 2 × Daimler engines , 77 kW (105 hp) each

Performance

- Maximum speed: 48.6 km/h (30 mph, 26 kn)
- Endurance: 38 hours and 40 minutes
LZ 5
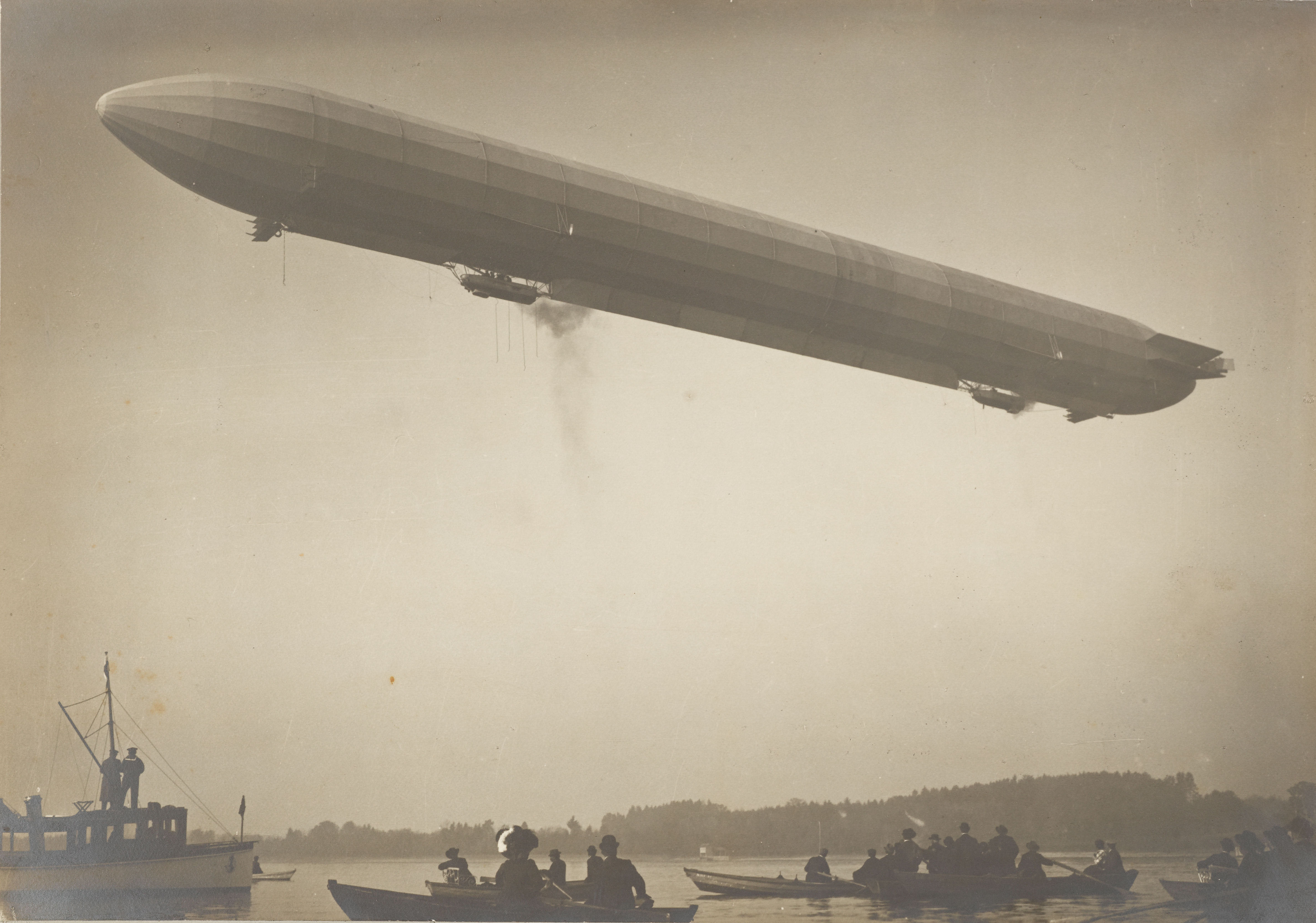
LZ 5 over Lake Constance in 1909.

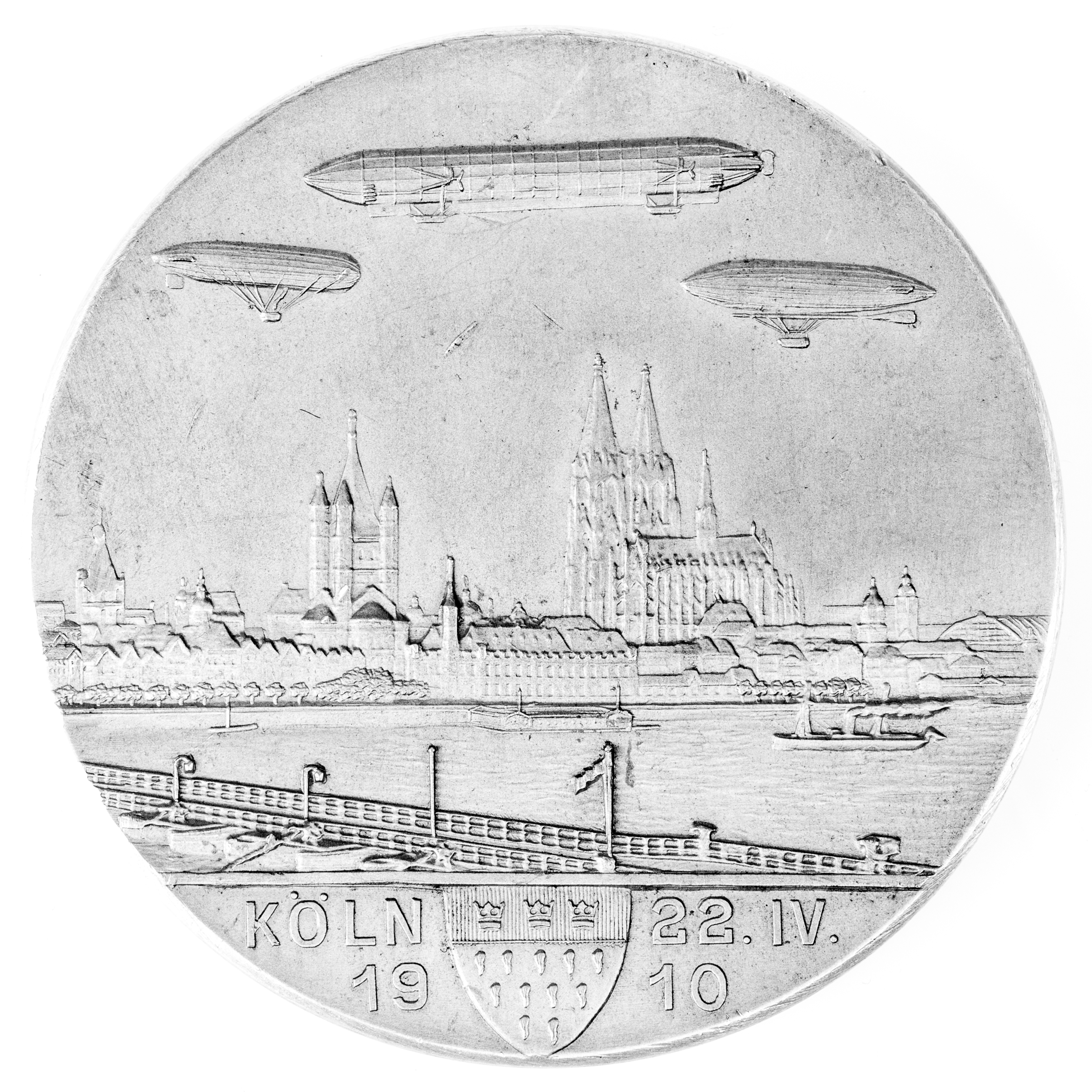
Front side of the commemorative medal minted in 1910.

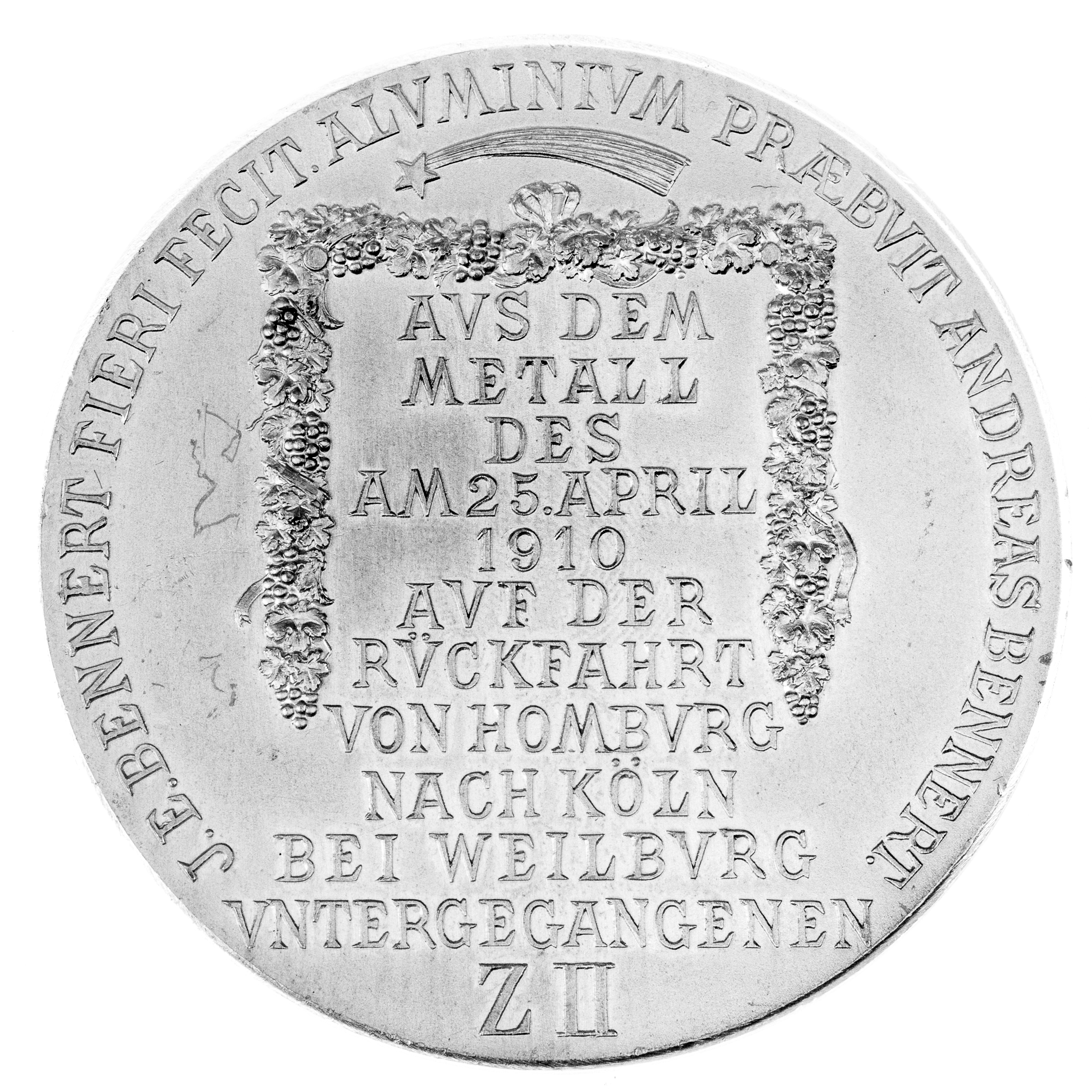
Back side of the commemorative medal minted in 1910.

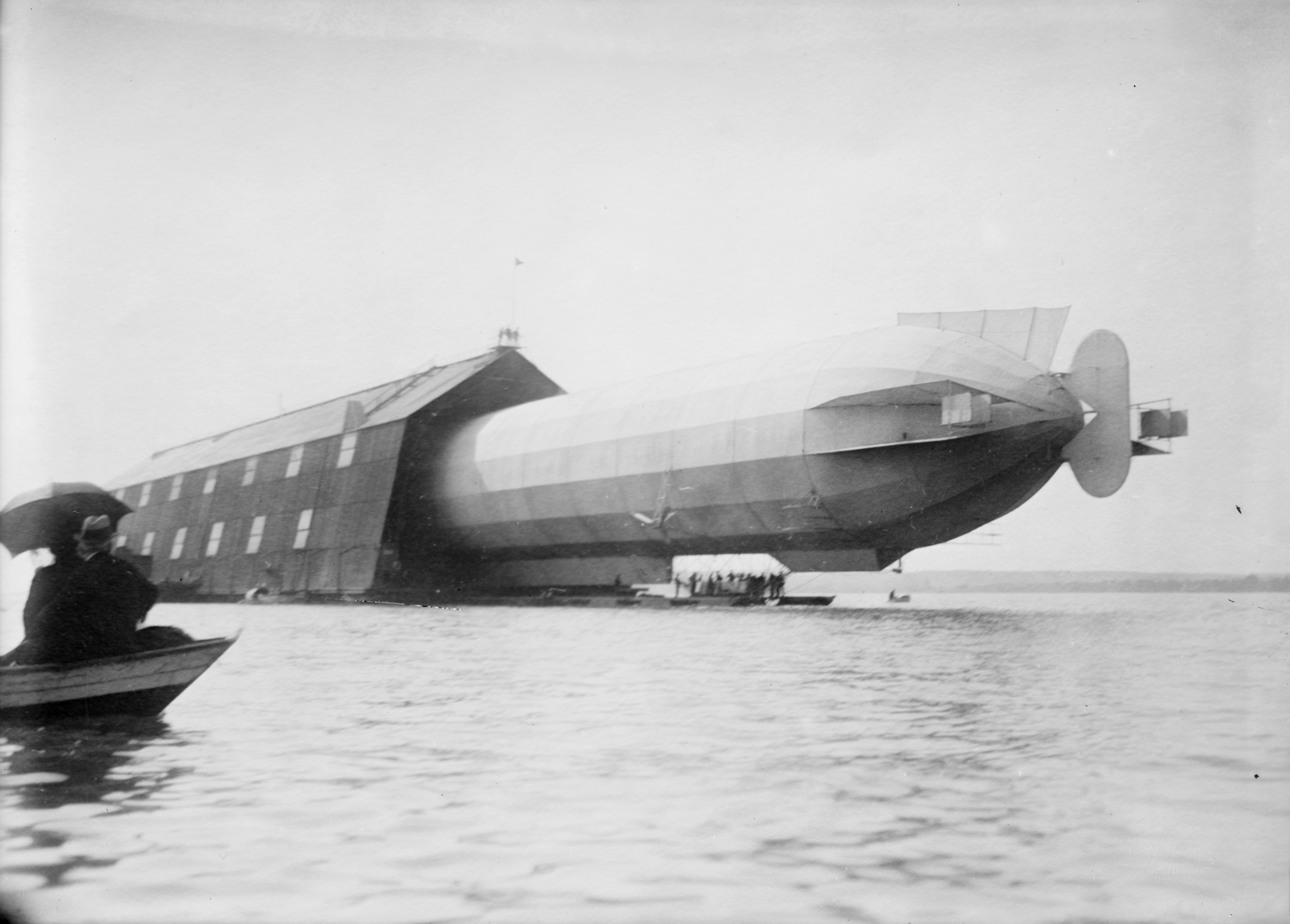
LZ 5 leaving the floating balloon hall before its first flight over Lake Constance, Germany in May 1909.
