= LZ 4 =

German experimental airship

Zeppelin LZ 4
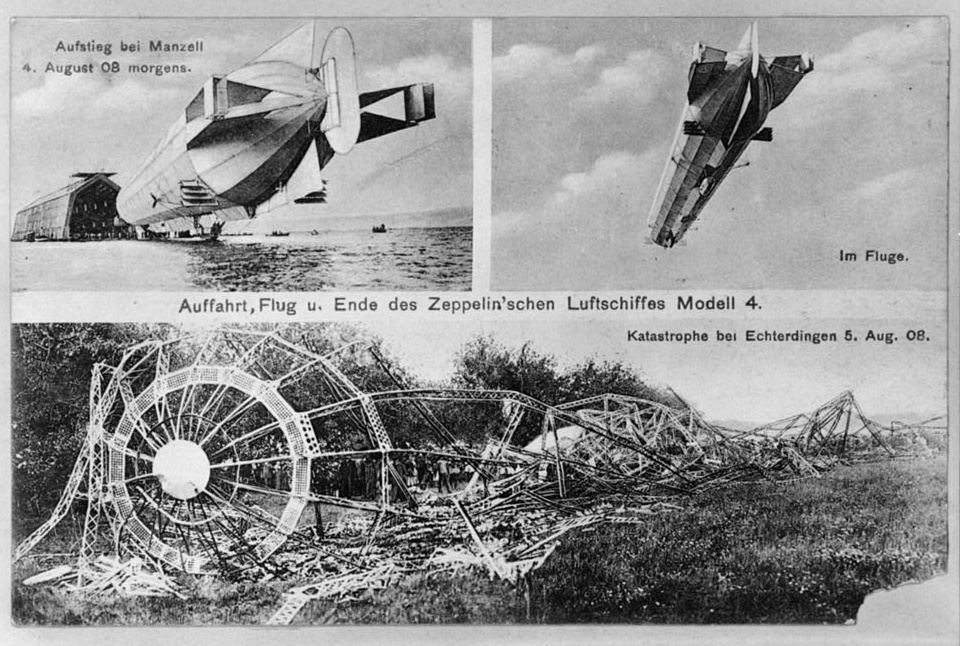

General information
- Type: Experimental airship
- National origin: Germany
- Designer: Ludwig Dürr
- Status: Destroyed in crash
- Number built: 1

History
- First flight: 20 June 1908

The Zeppelin LZ 4 was a German experimental airship constructed under the direction of Ferdinand von Zeppelin. First flown on 20 June 1908, it made a series of successful flights including a 12-hour flight over Switzerland. It was destroyed when it caught fire after landing to carry out engine repairs during a projected 24-hour endurance trial. This disaster proved fortunate for Zeppelin: donations by the German public raised 6.5 million marks, so guaranteeing the future of his development of airships.

== Background ==
The successful flights of LZ 3 in 1906 had produced a change in the official attitude to Count Zeppelin's work, and a grant of 500,000 marks had been voted by the Reichstag. However, a condition of purchase by the government was the completion of a 24-hour trial flight. This was beyond the capabilities of LZ 3, so work was started on a larger airship with greater fuel capacity.

== Design and development ==
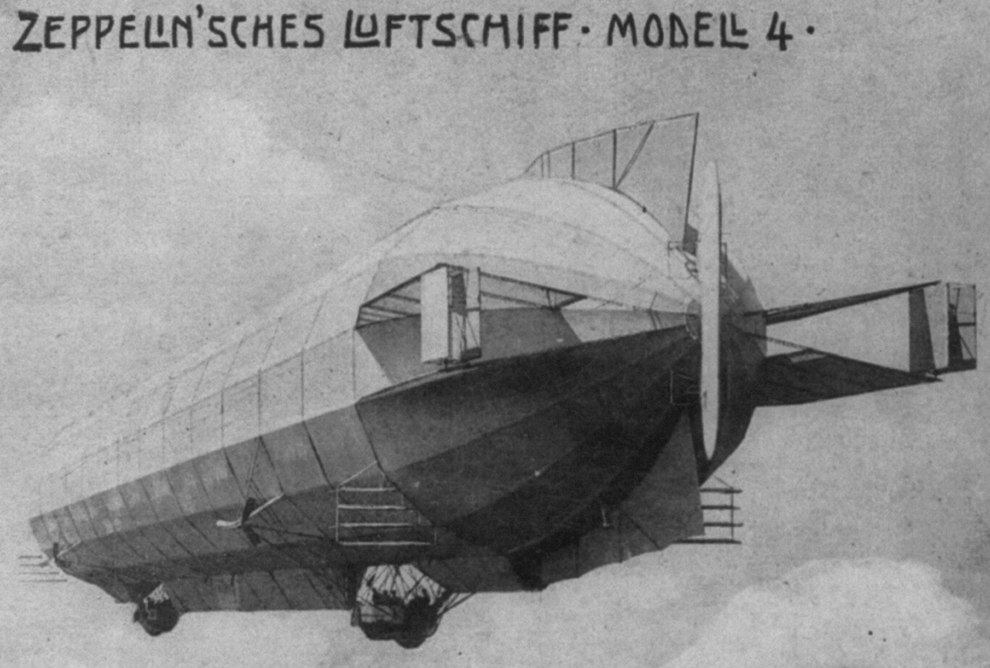
Zeppelin airship, model 4

Construction of LZ 4 was started in November 1907. The design closely followed that of LZ 3, but with increased diameter and length and having 17 gasbags. A central crew cabin was added in the middle of the keel, from which a ladder ran up through the envelope to an observation platform on top of the hull, intended for making star-sightings for navigational purposes. Initially, small rectangular rudders were fitted at either end of the hull: these proved inadequate to control the airship and were removed and replaced by single rudders mounted between the tips of the biplane horizontal stabilisers at the stern. Later each of these was replaced by a pair of rudders, and large fixed fins bearing a large oval rudder fitted at the stern.

== Operational history ==
LZ 4 first flew on 20 June 1908, when a flight lasting 18 minutes revealed the inadequacy of its steering arrangements. After modifications further trials were made on 23 and 29 June, and on 1 July a spectacular 12 hour cross-country flight was made during which it was flown over Switzerland to Zürich and then back to Lake Constance, covering 386 km (240 mi) and reaching an altitude of 795 m (2,600 ft).

On 13 July 1908, the airship was reinflated with fresh hydrogen to ensure maximum lift for the planned 24-hour endurance trial, which was to be a return flight to Mainz. Shortly after setting off the next morning a fan broke on the forward engine and it had to turn back. The following day it was damaged while being manoeuvered out of its hangar: repairs were not completed until the end of the month. The trial flight finally started on 4 August, when LZ 4 lifted off at 06:22 in the morning, carrying 12 people and sufficient fuel for 31 hours of flight. The flight to Zürich had excited considerable public interest, and large crowds gathered along the route to witness the flight, which took it over Konstanz, Schaffhausen, Basel and Strasbourg. Shortly after passing Strasbourg the forward engine had to be stopped since the fuel tank in the engine gondola had been exhausted, and needed to be refilled. At this point the airship was flying light due to the heat of the sun having caused the hydrogen to expand, and was being held at a low altitude by dynamic downforce generated by flying in a nose-down attitude: with the loss of the power of one engine, it rose to an altitude of 820 m (2,690 ft), venting gas from the relief valves as it did so. At 1:58 p.m the aft engine had to be stopped for refuelling: this time the airship rose to 884 m (2,900 ft), with a further loss of hydrogen. Two further engine stoppages caused further loss of gas: by now LZ 4 was only being kept in the air by dynamic lift generated by flying with a nose-up attitude, the resultant drag reducing its speed to 16 km/h (9.9 mph), and at 5:24 pm a landing was made on the Rhine near Oppenheim, 23 kilometres (14 mi) short of Mainz. All superfluous items and five crew members were unloaded, and the flight was resumed at 10:20. Mainz was reached half an hour later, and the ship turned to begin its return journey. Further engine problems followed: a crank bearing in the forward engine melted at 1:27 am, reducing airspeed to about 32 km/h (20 mph) and it was decided to land to have the engine repaired by engineers from the Daimler works at Untertürkheim. Accordingly, LZ 4 was set down at 7:51 am at Echterdingen.

The airship was tethered and engineers removed the forward engine to make repairs, but during the afternoon LZ 4 was torn from its moorings by a gust of wind. The soldiers present as a ground handling party could not hold it down, but it was brought to earth by a crew member who had remained on board. Unfortunately, the ship came into contact with a half-dead pear tree while landing, which damaged some of the gasbags, and it immediately caught fire. The cause of ignition was later ascribed to a static charge being produced when the rubberised cotton of the gasbags was torn.

The disaster took place in front of an estimated 40 to 50 thousand spectators and produced an extraordinary wave of nationalistic support for Zeppelin's work. Unsolicited donations from the public poured in: enough had been received within 24 hours to rebuild the airship, and the eventual total was over 6 million marks were donated, at last providing Zeppelin with a sound financial base for his experiments.

== Specifications ==
Data from Robinson 1973 p.331

General characteristics

- Length: 136 m (446 ft 0 in)
- Diameter: 12.95 m (42 ft 6 in)
- Volume: 15,008 m^{3} (530,000 cu ft)
- Powerplant: 2 × Daimler piston engines , 78 kW (105 hp) each

Performance

- Maximum speed: 48 km/h (30 mph, 26 kn)
- Endurance: 31 hours

== See also ==
Related lists

- List of Zeppelins
