= LZ 3 =

German experimental airship

Zeppelin LZ 3
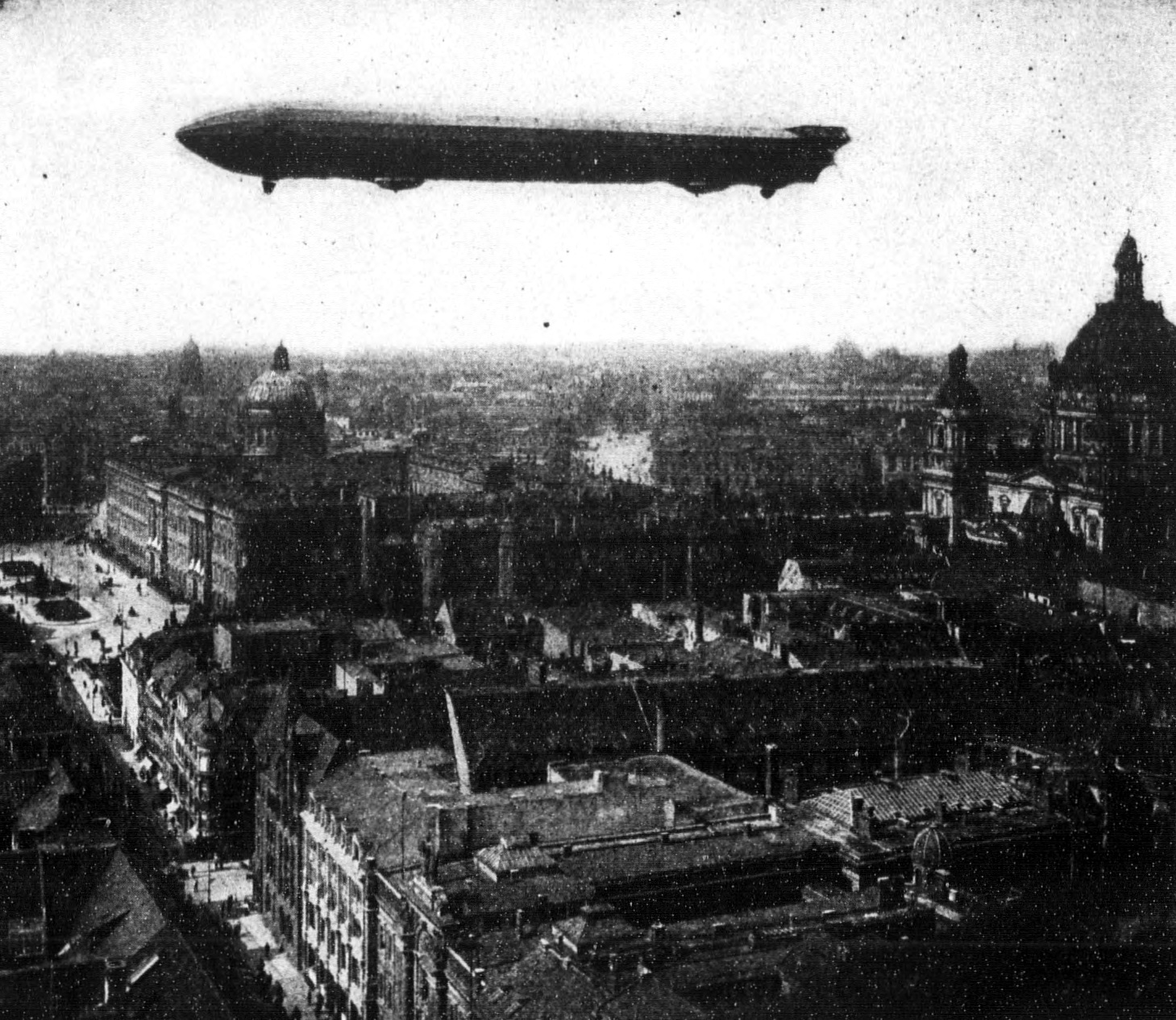
- The LZ 3 flying over Berlin, 1909

General information
- Type: Experimental airship
- National origin: Germany
- Designer: Ludwig Dürr
- Number built: 1

History
- First flight: 9 October 1906

The Zeppelin LZ 3 was a German experimental airship constructed in Friedrichshafen under the direction of Ferdinand von Zeppelin. It was first flown on 9 October 1906 and was later purchased by the German Army and operated as Z I until being retired in 1913. Before being purchased by the Army, LZ 3 made many flights and carried a number of influential passengers, including the German Crown Prince.

== Design and development ==
The design of LZ 3 closely followed that of its predecessor, the LZ 2. The hull framework was of identical layout and size and the same engines and propellers were used, although the volume of lifting gas was increased. LZ 2 had shown severe pitch instability, and LZ 3 was fitted with two pairs of biplane elevators, one set in front of the forward gondola and the second behind the rear gondola, and fixed biplane horizontal stabilisers at the rear of the hull.

Following the first flights in 1906 some modifications were made: the triangular section keel between the gondolas was extended fore and aft, the biplane elevators were replaced by two sets of quadruple elevators mounted at either end of the cylindrical section of the hull and the rudders were mounted between the tips of the horizontal stabilisers.

After the destruction of LZ 4 it was extensively rebuilt, with the addition of an extra bay increasing its length by 8 m (26 ft 6 in) and gas capacity to 12,888 cu m (430,800 cu ft). A large vertical fin was added above the stern of the hull and new engines, each providing 105 hp (78 kW) were fitted, giving a maximum speed of (27.5 mph)

== Operational history ==
LZ 3 was first flown on 9 October 1906, when a successful flight was made lasting 2 hours 17 minutes and carrying eleven people. A second shorter flight was made the next day, following which it was deflated and laid up for the winter. These flights caused a reevaluation of Zeppelin's work on the part of the German government, and a grant of 500,000 marks was made to him. However it was stipulated that an acceptance flight lasting 24 hours would have to be completed before any airship could be bought by the Government: realising that LZ 3 was incapable of meeting this requirement, work was started on the LZ 4. Following modifications to the control surfaces LZ 3 was next flown on 24 September 1907, when it made a flight lasting 4 hours 17 minutes, and a series of successful flights was made in the following days, including one on 30 September lasting 7 hours 54 minutes during which it was flown over land for the first time, flying north as far as Ravensburg. During this flight some difficulty in managing the airship due to the up and downdraughts produced by the hilly terrain was experienced. On 8 October a brief flight was made with Crown Prince William, the heir to the throne, on board and the airship was then deflated for the winter. On 14 December the floating hangar broke loose from its moorings during a storm and was driven ashore, severely damaging LZ 3.

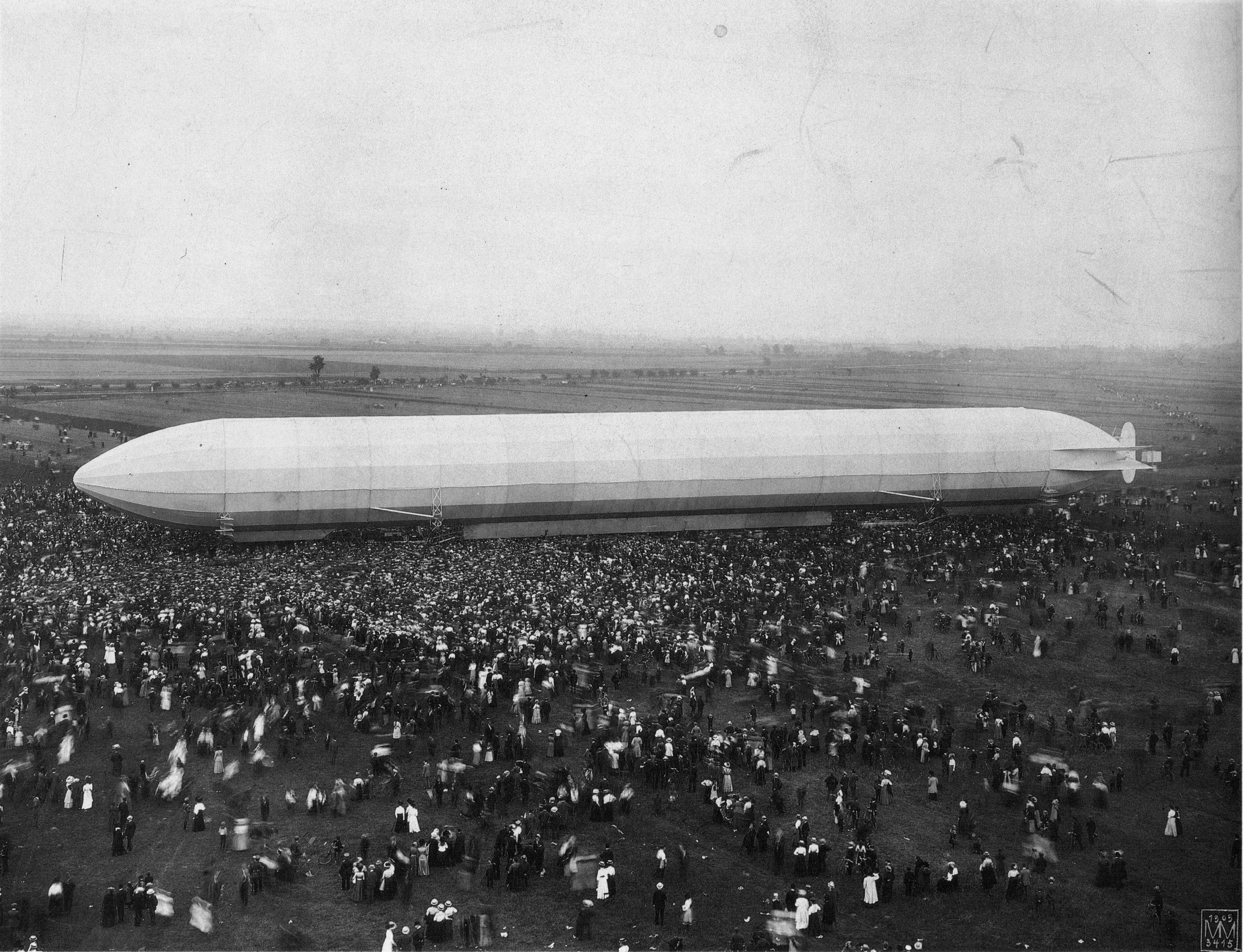
LZ 3 in 1909 at Tegel near Berlin, a former artillery firing range

Following the destruction of LZ 4, LZ 3 was repaired and enlarged. It was reinflated on 21 October 1908 and a series of short test flights were made between 23 and 26 October. On 27 October a flight lasting 5 hours 55 minutes was made with the Kaiser's brother, Admiral Prince Heinrich, on board. On 7 November, Prince William was a passenger, and the airship flew 80 km (50 mi) to Donaueschingen, where the Kaiser was then staying. In spite of poor weather conditions, the flight succeeded: two days later LZ 3 was officially accepted by the Government and on 10 November Zeppelin was rewarded with an official visit to Friedrichshafen by the Kaiser, during which Zeppelin was awarded the Order of the Black Eagle.

The renamed Z I's military crew and ground staff, commanded by Major Sperling, arrived at Friedrichshafen in March 1909 to begin training. In June it was flown to Metz, where it was stationed until being broken up as obsolete in March 1913.

== Specifications (as first flown) ==
Data from Robinson 1973 pp.29-31

General characteristics

- Length: 126.19 m (414 ft 0 in)
- Diameter: 11.75 m (38 ft 6 in)
- Volume: 11,429 m^{3} (403,600 cu ft)
- Powerplant: 2 × Daimler piston engines , 63 kW (84 hp) each

Performance

- Maximum speed: 40 km/h (25 mph, 22 kn)

== See also ==
- List of Zeppelins
- Zeppelin LZ 24 (L 3)
