= William Henry McGarvey =

Canadian oil drilling pioneer and politician (1843–1914)

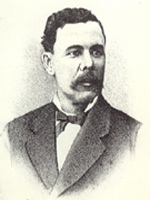
- Born: November 1843; Huntingdon, Canada East (now Quebec)
- Died: November 1914 (aged 70–71); Vienna, Austria-Hungary
- Occupations: Oilman, business magnate, entrepreneur and politician

William Henry McGarvey (November 1843 – November 1914) was a Canadian business magnate, entrepreneur and politician. McGarvey is best known for his exploits in Galicia, where he operated a highly successful petroleum company. McGarvey was one of the most successful "foreign drillers" of Petrolia, becoming a multimillionaire before the outbreak of the First World War destroyed his business.

== Early life ==
William Henry McGarvey was born in Huntingdon, Canada East, to Edward and Sarah McGarvey in November 1843. In 1857, the McGarvey family moved to Wyoming, Ontario, where Edward established a general store that prospered with the arrival of the Great Western Railway and the development of the oil fields in Oil Springs and Petrolia. In 1861, McGarvey relocated to Petrolia and opened up a general store known locally as "The Mammoth Store." When Petrolia incorporated as a village in December 1866, McGarvey became its first reeve, holding the position until March 5, 1867. McGarvey also served on Petrolia's town council from 1868 to 1870, was elected mayor in 1876 and became warden of Lambton County in 1879. He ran unsuccessfully for provincial office in 1879. In 1876, the Geological Survey of Canada commissioned McGarvey to lead a survey of eastern Saskatchewan's mineral resources.

== Petroleum magnate ==
During his time at Petrolia, McGarvey invested in the petroleum industry, having stakes in eighteen oil properties, including the famous "Deluge" well struck in 1873 and a partnership in an oil refinery.

In 1879, McGarvey met British engineer and oil operator John Simeon Bergheim when he travelled to Petrolia to recruit men willing to drill in Europe. The men quickly became friends and partners, and in 1881 the pair moved to Ölheim, near Hanover to drill for oil. This venture resulted in limited success, and in 1882 McGarvey and Bergheim proceeded to Galicia and Romania. The pair formed the Bergheim & McGarvey company in 1883, and introduced the Canadian "pole tool drilling" system to the Galician oil fields, allowing exploration at previously unheard of depths and speed. The Canadian drilling system sped up the exploration of Galicia's oil fields, and reopened ones thought to have run dry. McGarvey and Bergheim also brought in Canadian drillers and equipment, which commenced a "technological revolution in the Galician oil basin."

McGarvey and Bergheim struck their first successful well at Waglowka, Western Galicia, about 1885, and by 1887 they began the construction of a refinery at Miariampole. Over the next ten years, McGarvey and Bergheim drilled 370 wells with a total depth of 100,000 meters. By the 1890s, the pair acquired mineral rights all over the province, and on July 4, 1895, McGarvey and Bergheim reorganized their company into a joint-stock company titled Galizische-Karpathen Petroleum Aktien-Gesellschaft. The company's headquarters was in Vienna, with a capital of 10 million crowns. In its first year of operations, the company produced nearly 35 million kilograms of crude oil, and employed roughly 2,400 workers by the end of the century. McGarvey became manager and chairman of the board, spending much of his time in Vienna managing the company. McGarvey's success had turned him into a multimillionaire, and he and his wife often socialized with European aristocrats. In 1908, Emperor Franz Joseph honoured McGarvey in a ceremony at the Vienna Imperial Palace for bringing the Canadian drilling system to Galicia, opening up the Austria oil fields and making the empire a net exporter of oil.

In 1912, McGarvey was asked by the British Admiralty to consult on the conversion of its military ships from coal to oil power and in the search for oil in British overseas territory.

== Marriage and children ==
On July 10, 1867, McGarvey married Helena Jane Weslowski of Mount Clemens, Michigan, daughter of a Polish émigré who had been expelled from the Russian Empire for anti-government activity. Together, they had five children:

- Nellie Edith McGarvey (1869–1882)
- William Edward McGarvey (1871–1872)
- Fred McGarvey (1873–1963). He married Margaret Fanny Salome Bergheim (1878-1952), niece of John Simeon Bergheim.
- Mary "Mamie" McGarvey (1876–1961). She married Eberhard Friedrich Alexander Joseph Edward Graf von Zeppelin, a nephew of Count Ferdinand von Zeppelin in 1895 and divorced him in 1906.
- Sarah "Kate" McGarvey (1883–1934). She married Erik Jurié von Lavandal, an Austrian judge.

In 1883, Weslowki and his three living children left Petrolia to join him in Galicia. They lived in a home McGarvey built at Mariampol, Galica. Each of the children attended the finest schools in Austria and Germany.

== Final years and death ==
In December 1897, Helena died at her daughter's estate in Graz, Austria. McGarvey remarried in 1905 to Eleanor Hamilton, a British woman.

McGarvey's company reached its peak in the early 1910s, becoming one of Europe's largest oil companies. The company's oil refinery at Trieste was one of the largest in Europe and shipped oil products and drilling equipment across the world. A subsidiary company managed drilling operations in Mexico, Cuba, Nigeria, Russia and elsewhere.

In early 1911, McGarvey's younger brother James, who managed oil properties at Grosny, Russia was murdered by armed robbers who broke into their home while they were eating dinner. The intruders also killed a servant, a guard, James' colleague Talbot Barnard and wounded a cook, before escaping with 100 pounds in cash. James' wife survived the encounter and was treated at a hospital in Vladikavkaz.

When the First World War broke out, McGarvey was reportedly heartbroken to be living in a nation at war with Britain. In the summer of 1914, Russia invaded Galicia, before being quickly pushed back by Germany and Austria-Hungary. In their retreat, the Russian army set fire to Galicia's oil wells and blew up the refineries, effectively destroying the oil industry in the region and McGarvey's company. Reportedly, Austrian authorities deemed McGarvey suspicious and placed him under house arrest. In November 1914, on his 71st birthday, McGarvey suffered a stroke and died. An obituary in the London Free Press noted that "He was thoroughly British and worry is supposed to have hastened his end."

== Honours ==
In 1908, McGarvey was knighted by the emperor of the Austro-Hungarian empire for his contributions to the empire's economy.

In 1997, McGarvey was inducted into the Canadian Petroleum Hall of Fame for his success as a petroleum magnate in Galicia.
