= Zeppelin LZ 31 =

LZ 31 (L 6)
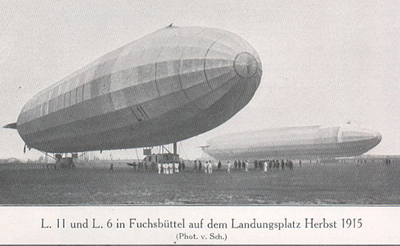
- The airships L 11 und L 6 in Fuhlsbüttel, 1915

General information
- Type: M-class reconnaissance-bomber rigid airship
- National origin: German Empire
- Manufacturer: Luftschiffbau Zeppelin
- Designer: Ludwig Dürr
- Primary user: Imperial German Navy
- Number built: 1

History
- First flight: 3 November 1914
- Retired: Caught fire and destroyed, 16 September 1916

The Imperial German Navy Zeppelin LZ 31 (L 6) was an M-class World War I Zeppelin.

== Operational history ==
Throughout the career of the Imperial German Navy Airship LZ 31 took part in 36 reconnaissance missions around the North Sea. This included marking minefields and one raid on the United Kingdom, dropping 700 kg (1,500 lb) of bombs.

== Raid on Cuxhaven ==
The Raid on Cuxhaven was a British ship-based air-raid on the Imperial German Navy complex at Cuxhaven mounted on Christmas Day, 1914. After the raid Zeppelin LZ 31 set off to find the attacking naval force the aircraft came from. After retrieving the aircraft, the Navy force attempted to return to base but HMS Empress was left behind. High enough that the Royal Navy ship's guns could not harm it, LZ 31 dropped bombs on HMS Empress but none of the airship's bombs hit their mark.

== Fire and destruction ==
On 16 September 1916 the airship was in its hangar at Fuhlsbüttel undergoing inflation when it caught fire and was destroyed with Zeppelin LZ 36.

== Specifications (LZ 31 / M2-class Zeppelin) ==
Data from Zeppelin : rigid airships, 1893-1940, The Zeppelin Airships - Part Two: Zeppelins of the Great War 1914–1918

General characteristics

- Crew: 16
- Capacity: 9,200 kg (20,283 lb) typical disposable load
- Length: 158 m (518 ft 4 in)
- Diameter: 14.9 m (48 ft 11 in) maximum
- Fineness ratio: 10.61
- Volume: 22,470 m^{3} (794,000 cu ft) in 18 gas cells
- Empty weight: 16,900 kg (37,258 lb)
- Fuel capacity: 4,000 kg (8,818 lb) maximum
- Useful lift: 26,100 kg (57,500 lb)
- Powerplant: 3 × Maybach C-X 6-cylinder water-cooled in-line piston engines, 130 kW (180 hp) each
- Propellers: 2-bladed fixed-pitch propellers

Performance

- Maximum speed: 84 km/h (52 mph, 45 kn)
- Cruise speed: 80.5 km/h (50.0 mph, 43.5 kn)
- Range: 2,200 km (1,400 mi, 1,200 nmi)
- Service ceiling: 2,800 m (9,200 ft) static

Armament

- Guns: 4x machine-guns

== See also ==
- List of Zeppelins
