= Ferdinand von Zeppelin =

German general and airship pioneer (1838–1917)

Graf Ferdinand von Zeppelin
- Ferdinand Adolf Heinrich August Graf von Zeppelin
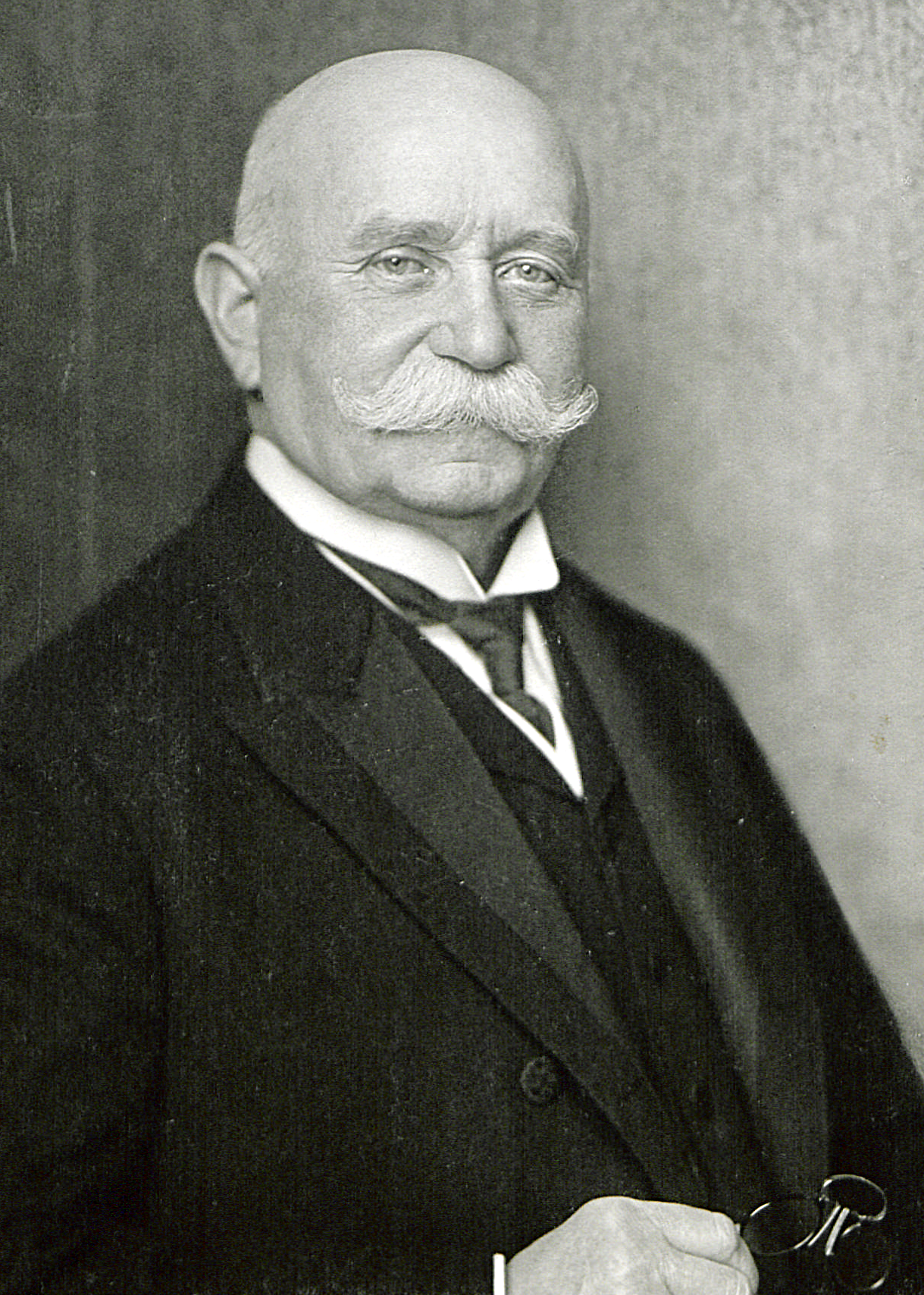
- Zeppelin in 1917
- Born: 8 July 1838; Konstanz, Baden
- Died: 8 March 1917 (aged 78); Charlottenburg, Germany
- Spouse: Isabella Freiin von Wolff (m. 1869)
- Military career
- Allegiance: Kingdom of Württemberg (1855–1917); German Empire (1871–1917)
- Branch: Cavalry
- Service years: 1855-1891
- Rank: General der Kavallerie
- Commands: 19th Uhlans
- Ferdinand von Zeppelin's voice Recorded 24 August 1908

Count Ferdinand von Zeppelin (German: Ferdinand Adolf Heinrich August Graf von Zeppelin; 8 July 1838 – 8 March 1917) was a German general and later inventor of the Zeppelin rigid airships. His name became synonymous with airships and dominated long-distance flight until the 1930s. He founded the company Luftschiffbau Zeppelin.

== Family and personal life ==
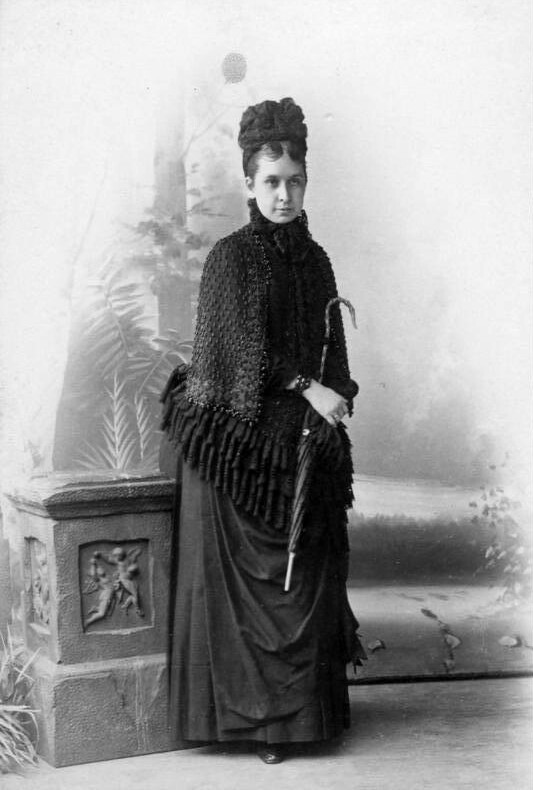
Isabella Gräfin von Zeppelin

Ferdinand was the scion of a noble family. Zepelin, the family's eponymous hometown, is a small community outside the town of Bützow, in Mecklenburg.

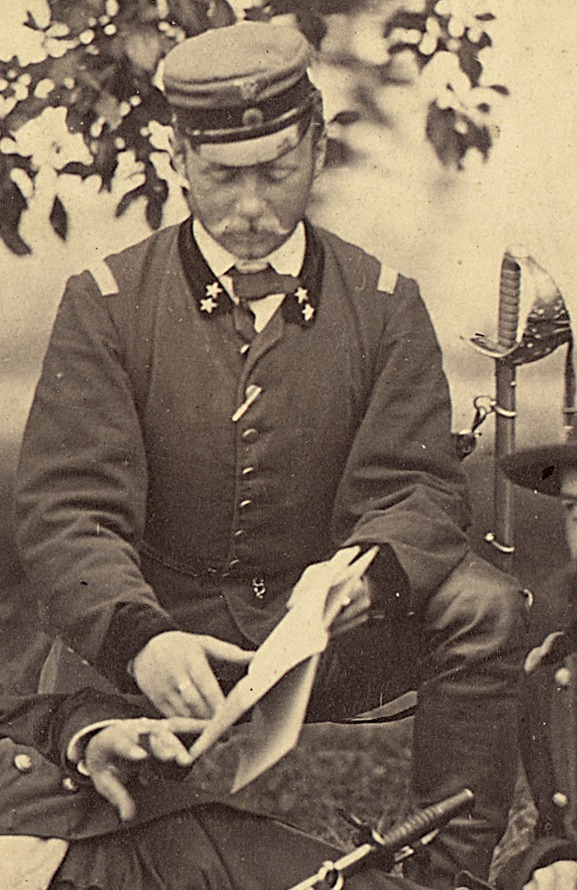
Ferdinand von Zeppelin at the Army of the Potomac's headquarters, Fairfax Courthouse, Virginia, June 1863 by Alexander Gardner

Ferdinand was the son of Württemberg Minister and Hofmarschall Friedrich Jerôme Wilhelm Karl Graf von Zeppelin (1807–1886) and his wife Amélie Françoise Pauline (born Macaire d'Hogguer) (1816–1852). Ferdinand spent his childhood with his sister and brother at their Girsberg manor near Konstanz, where he was educated by private tutors. Ferdinand married Isabella Freiin von Wolff in Berlin. She was from the house of Alt-Schwanenburg (located in the present-day town of Gulbene in Latvia, then part of Livonia). They had a daughter, Helene (Hella) von Zeppelin (1879–1967) who in 1909 married Graf Alexander von Brandenstein-Zeppelin (1881–1949).

Ferdinand had a nephew Baron Max von Gemmingen, who volunteered at the start of the First World War, after he was past military age, to become general staff officer assigned to the military airship LZ 12 Sachsen.

Count Everhard von Zeppelin, Second Lieutenant in the German Lancers, married November 1895, Mary "Mamie" McGarvey, daughter of Canadian magnate William Henry McGarvey, owner of the oil wells of Galicia and his wife, Helena J. Weslowska. A former Count von Zeppelin married a granddaughter of the 1st Earl of Ranfurly.

== Army career ==
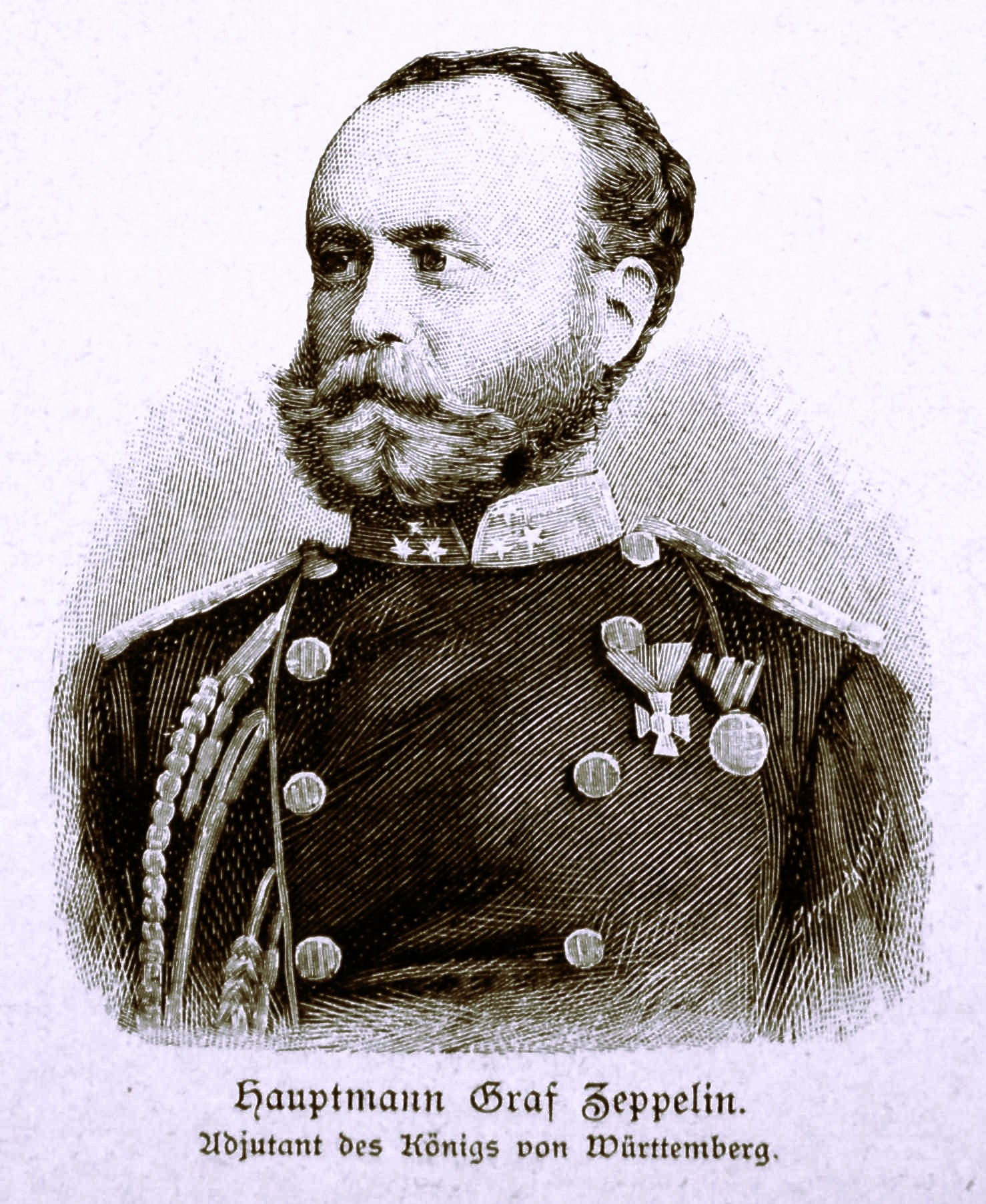
In uniform as adjutant to Charles I of Württemberg, 1865

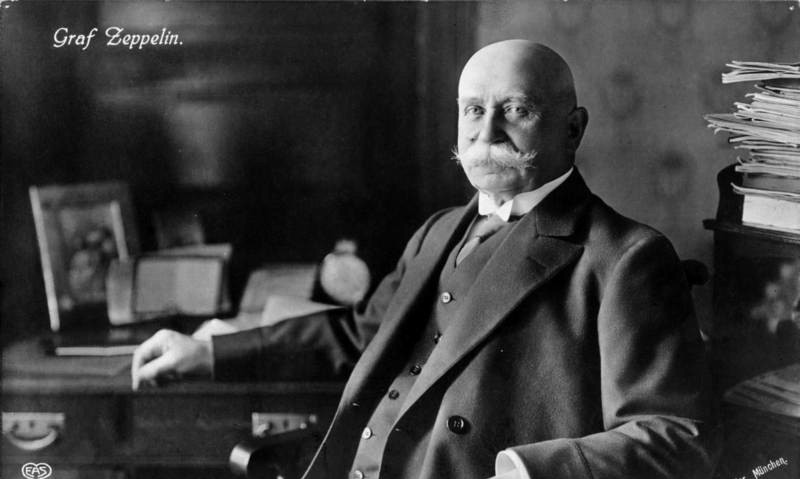
Zeppelin in 1900

In 1853, Count Zeppelin left to attend the polytechnic at Stuttgart, and in 1855 he became a cadet of the military school at Ludwigsburg and then started his career as an army officer in the army of Württemberg.

By 1858, Zeppelin had been promoted to lieutenant, and that year he was given leave to study science, engineering, and chemistry at Tübingen. Würtemberg's mobilising for the Austro-Sardinian War interrupted this study in 1859 when he was called up to the Ingenieurkorps (Würtemberg engineering corps) at Ulm.

In 1863, Zeppelin took leave to act as an observer for the Union's Army of the Potomac in the American Civil War in Virginia. Later, he travelled to the Upper Midwest with a party that probably included two Russians. Led by Native American (probably Ojibwe) guides, they canoed and portaged from the western end of Lake Superior up the St. Louis River and across to Crow Wing, Minnesota, on the Upper Mississippi River. On reaching Saint Paul, Minnesota (via stagecoach and hired carriage), Zeppelin encountered German-born itinerant balloonist John Steiner and made his first aerial ascent with him from a site near the International Hotel in downtown St. Paul on 19 August. Many years later he attributed the beginning of his thinking about dirigible lighter-than-air craft to this experience.

In 1865, Zeppelin was appointed adjutant of the King of Württemberg and as general staff officer participated in the Austro-Prussian War of 1866. He was awarded the Ritterkreuz (Knight's Cross) of the Military Merit Order of Württemberg. In the Franco-Prussian War of 1870–1871 a reconnaissance mission behind enemy lines, during which he narrowly avoided capture, made him famous among many Germans.

From 1882 to 1885, Zeppelin was commander of the 19th Uhlans in Ulm and was then appointed to be the envoy of Württemberg in Berlin. In 1890, he gave up the post to return to army service and was given command of a Prussian cavalry brigade. His handling of this at the 1890 autumn manoeuvres was severely criticised, and he was forced to retire from the Army, albeit with the rank of generalleutnant.

=== Promotions ===
- 23 September 1858: Lieutenant (as of December 1871 Second-Lieutenant, as of January 1899 Leutnant)
- 22 September 1862: Ober-Lieutenant (as of December 1871 Premier-Lieutenant, as of January 1899 Oberleutnant)
- 31 March 1866: Rittmeister
- 4 May 1873: Major
- 18 September 1880: Oberstlieutenant (as of January 1899 Oberstleutnant)
- 12 January 1884: Oberst
- 4 August 1888: Generalmajor
- 18 November 1890: Generallieutenant (as of January 1899 Generalleutnant)
- 5 December 1905: Charakter als General der Kavallerie

== Airships ==
Ferdinand von Zeppelin served as an official observer with the Union Army during the U.S Civil War. During the Peninsular Campaign, he visited the balloon camp of Thaddeus S. C. Lowe shortly after Lowe's services were terminated by the Army. Zeppelin then travelled to St. Paul, where the German-born former Army balloonist John Steiner offered tethered flights. His first ascent in a balloon is said to have been the inspiration of his later interest in aeronautics.

Zeppelin's ideas for large airships were first expressed in a diary entry dated 25 March 1874. Inspired by a recent lecture given by Heinrich von Stephan on the subject of "World Postal Services and Air Travel", he outlined the basic principle of his later craft: a large rigidly-framed outer envelope containing a number of separate gasbags. In 1887, the success of Charles Renard and Arthur Krebs' 1884 airship La France prompted him to send a letter to the King of Württemberg about the military necessity for dirigibles and the lack of German development in this field.

After his resignation from the army in 1891 at age 52, Zeppelin devoted his full attention to airships. He hired the engineer Theodor Gross to make tests of possible materials and to assess available engines for both fuel efficiency and power-to-weight ratio. He also had air propellers tested and strove to obtain higher purity hydrogen gas from suppliers. Zeppelin was so confident of his concept that in June 1891 he wrote to the King of Württemberg's secretary, announcing he was to start building, and shortly after requested a review from the Prussian Army's Chief of General Staff. The next day Zeppelin almost gave up as he realized he had underestimated air resistance, but resumed work on hearing that Hans Bartsch von Sigsfeld made light but powerful engines, information soon shown to be overoptimistic. Whereupon Zeppelin urged his supporter Max von Duttenhofer to press Daimler-Motoren-Gesellschaft for more efficient engines so as not to fall behind the French. Duttenhofer wrote to Gross threatening to withdraw support, and Zeppelin shortly afterwards sacked Gross, citing Gross's lack of support and writing that he was "an obstacle in my path".

Despite those setbacks, Zeppelin's organization had refined his idea: a rigid aluminium framework covered in a fabric envelope; separate multiple internal gas cells, each free to expand and contract thus obviating the need for ballonets; a modular frame allowing addition of sections and gas cells; and the controls, engines and gondola rigidly attached. After publishing the idea in March 1892 he hired the engineer Theodor Kober who started work testing and further refining the design. Zeppelin submitted Kober's 1893 detailed designs to the Prussian Airship Service, whose committee reviewed it in 1894. In June 1895 this committee recommended minimum funds be granted, but withdrew this offer and rejected the design in July.

One month later, in August 1895, Zeppelin received a patent for Kober's design and described as an "airship-train" (Lenkbarer Luftfahrzug mit mehreren hintereinanderen angeordneten Tragkörpern [Steerable airship-train with several carrier structures arranged one behind another].) The patent describes an airship consisting of three rigid sections flexibly connected. The front section, intended to contain the crew and engines, was 117.35 m (385.0 ft) long with a gas capacity of 9514 cu m (336,000 cu ft): the middle section was 16 m (52 ft 6 in) long with an intended useful load of 599 kg (1,321 lb) and the rear section 39.93 m (131.0 ft) long with an intended load of 1,996 kg (4,400 lb).

In early 1896, Zeppelin's lecture on steerable airship designs given to the Association of German Engineers (VDI) so impressed them that the VDI launched a public appeal for financial support for him. This led to a first contact with Carl Berg who supplied aluminium alloys which Zeppelin had tested, and by May 1898 they, together with Philipp Holzmann, Daimler, Max von Eyth, Carl von Linde, and Friedrich Voith, had formed the joint stock company Gesellschaft zur Förderung der Luftschiffahrt. Zeppelin invested 441,000 Marks, over half the total capital. Actual construction then started of what was to be the first successful rigid airship, the Zeppelin LZ1.

Berg's involvement with the project later led to allegations that Zeppelin had used the patent and designs of David Schwarz's airship of 1897. Berg had signed a contract with Schwartz under the terms of which he undertook not to supply aluminium to any other airship manufacturer. He later made a payment to Schwartz's widow as compensation for dissolving this arrangement. Claims that Zeppelin had been influenced by Schwartz were denied by Eckener in 1938 and also rejected by later historians. Zeppelin's design was "radically different" in both its scale and its framework from that of Schwarz.

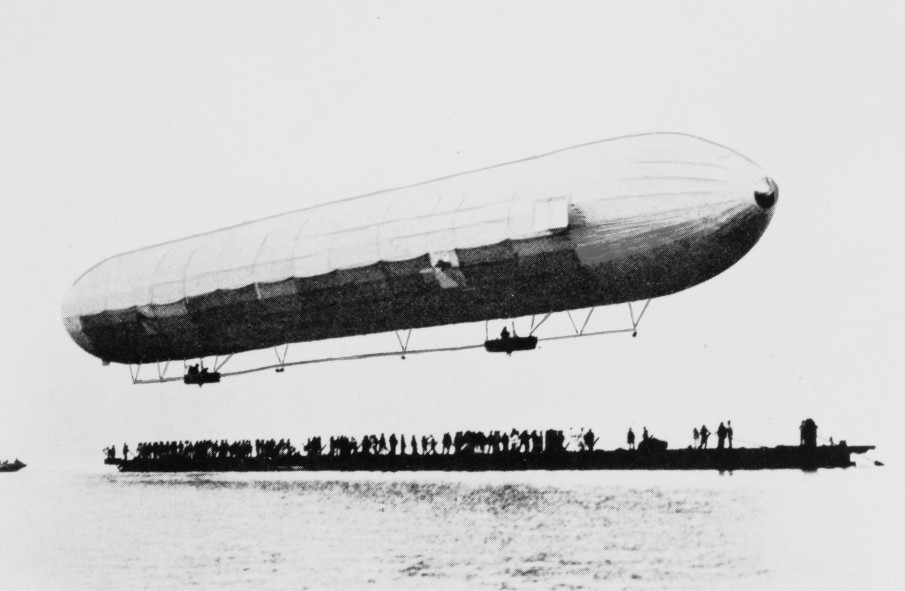
First flight of the LZ 1

On 2 July 1900, Zeppelin made the first flight with the LZ 1 over Lake Constance near Friedrichshafen in southern Germany. The airship rose from the ground and remained in the air for 20 minutes, but was damaged on landing. After repairs and some modifications two further flights were made by LZ 1 in October 1900, However the airship was not considered successful enough to justify investment by the government, and since the experiments had exhausted Count Zeppelin's funds, he was forced to suspend his work.

Zeppelin still enjoyed the support of the King of Württemberg, who authorised a state lottery which raised 124,000 marks. A contribution of 50,000 marks was received from Prussia, and Zeppelin raised the remainder of the necessary money by mortgaging his wife's estates. Still supported by Daimler and Carl Berg, construction of his second airship, the LZ 2, was started in April 1905. It was completed by 30 November, when it was first taken out of its hangar, but a ground-handling mishap caused the bows to be pulled into the water, damaging the forward control surfaces. Repairs were completed by 17 January 1906, when LZ 2 made its only flight. Too much ballast was jettisoned on takeoff, causing the airship to rise to an altitude of 427 m (1,401 ft). Here a stiff breeze was encountered, and although the airship was at first able to overcome this, the failure of the forward engine due to cooling problems followed by the failure of the other due to a broken clutch-spring left the airship at the mercy of the wind. It was brought down near Kisslegg in the Allgäu mountains, with some damage caused by the stern's striking some trees during mooring, but was more severely damaged by high winds the following night, and had to be dismantled.

In May 1906, work started on a third airship, LZ 3. This was the same size and configuration as LZ 2, but had a greater gas capacity. Finished by the end of the year, it made two successful flights at a speed of 30 miles per hour (48 km/h), and in 1907 attained a speed of 36 miles per hour (58 km/h). The success of LZ 3 produced a change in the official attitude to his work, and the Reichstag voted that he should be awarded 500,000 marks to continue his work. However the purchase by the Government of an airship was made conditional on the successful completion of a 24‑hour trial flight. Knowing that this was beyond the capabilities of LZ 3, work was started on a larger airship, the LZ 4. This first flew on 20 June 1908. The final financial breakthrough only came after the Zeppelin LZ 4 was destroyed by fire at Echterdingen after breaking free of its moorings during a storm. The airship's earlier flights had excited public interest in the development of the airships, and a subsequent collection campaign raised over 6 million German marks. The money was used to create the 'Luftschiffbau-Zeppelin GmbH' and the Zeppelin foundation (Zeppelin Stiftung).

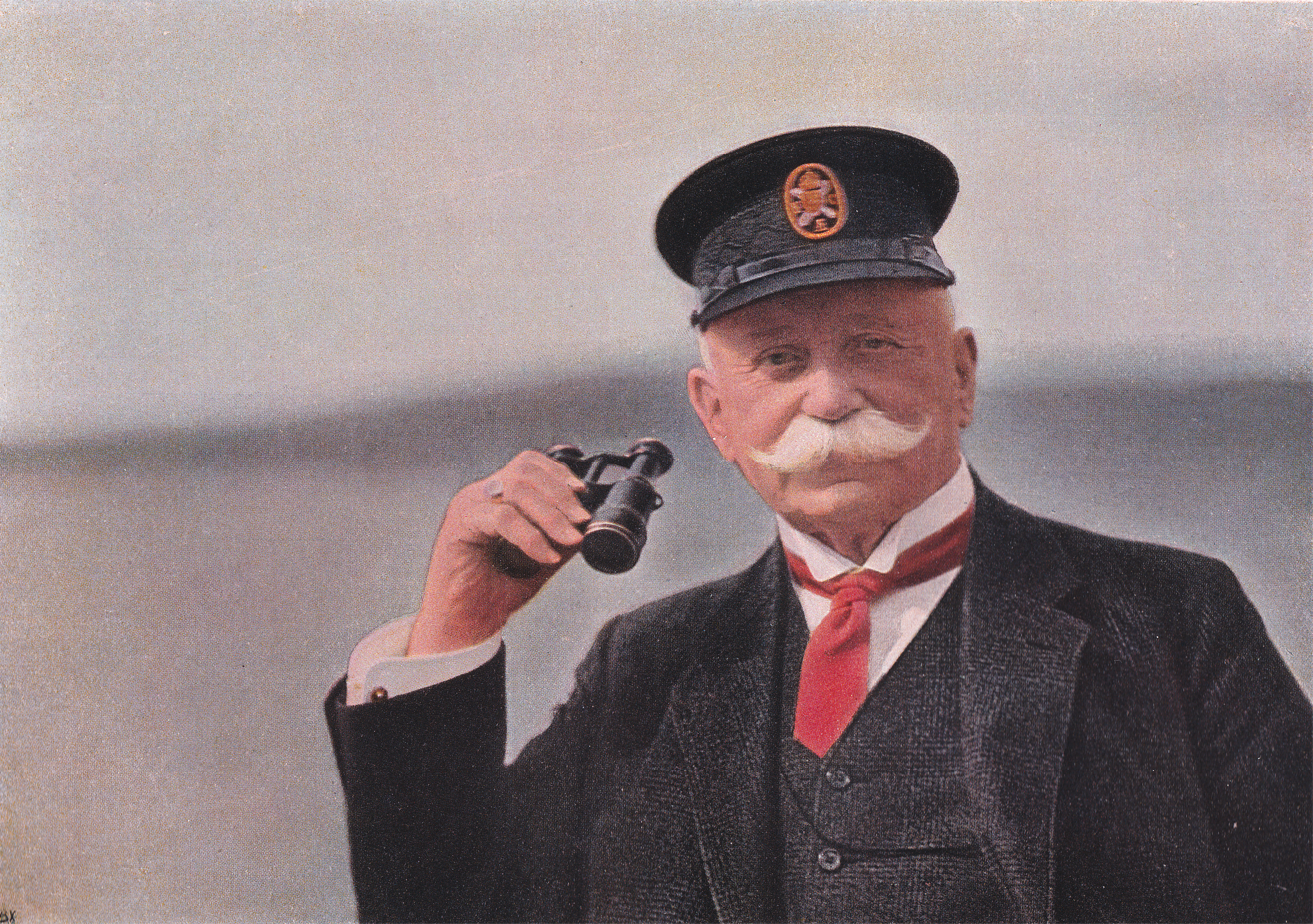
Color photographic print of Ferdinand von Zeppelin during the expedition to Spitzbergen in 1910, taken by Adolf Miethe

Following the destruction of LZ 4, LZ 3, which had been damaged when the floating hangar broke free of its mooring during a storm, was repaired: at the same time it was lengthened by 8 m. It was re-inflated on 21 October 1908 and after a series of short test flights a flight lasting 5 hours 55 minutes took place on 27 October with the Kaiser's brother, Admiral Prince Heinrich, on board. On 7 November, with Crown Prince William as a passenger, it flew 80 km (50 mi) to Donaueschingen, where the Kaiser was then staying. In spite of poor weather conditions, the flight succeeded: two days later LZ 3 was officially accepted by the Government and on 10 November Zeppelin was rewarded with an official visit to Friedrichshafen by the Kaiser, during which a short demonstration flight over Lake Constance was made and Zeppelin awarded the Order of the Black Eagle.

Although a replacement for LZ 4, the LZ 5 was built and accepted into Army service as L II, Zeppelin's relationship with the military authorities continued to be poor, and deteriorated considerably due to his criticism of the Army following the loss of L II, which was carried away from its moorings and wrecked on 25 April 1910. However, the business director of Luftschiffbau-Zeppelin, Alfred Colsman, came up with a scheme to capitalise on the public enthusiasm for Zeppelin's airships by establishing a passenger-carrying business.

Until 1914, the German Aviation Association (Deutsche Luftschiffahrtsgesellschaft or DELAG) transported 37,250 people on over 1,600 flights without an incident. Within a few years the zeppelin revolution began creating the age of air transportation. During the First World War, Imperial Germany decided to deploy Zeppelins as long-distance bombers and launched numerous attacks upon Belgium, France and the United Kingdom.

== Other aircraft ==
- 1899 unrealised plans for a paddlewheel aeroplane
- 1912 financial support of Flugzeugbau Friedrichshafen which was to supply 850 aeroplanes 1917/1918;
- 1914 commissions Claude Dornier to develop flying boats
- 1914 founds Versuchsbau Gotha-Ost with Robert Bosch, which built a number of Riesenflugzeug giant aircraft such as the Zeppelin-Staaken R.VI

== Legacy ==
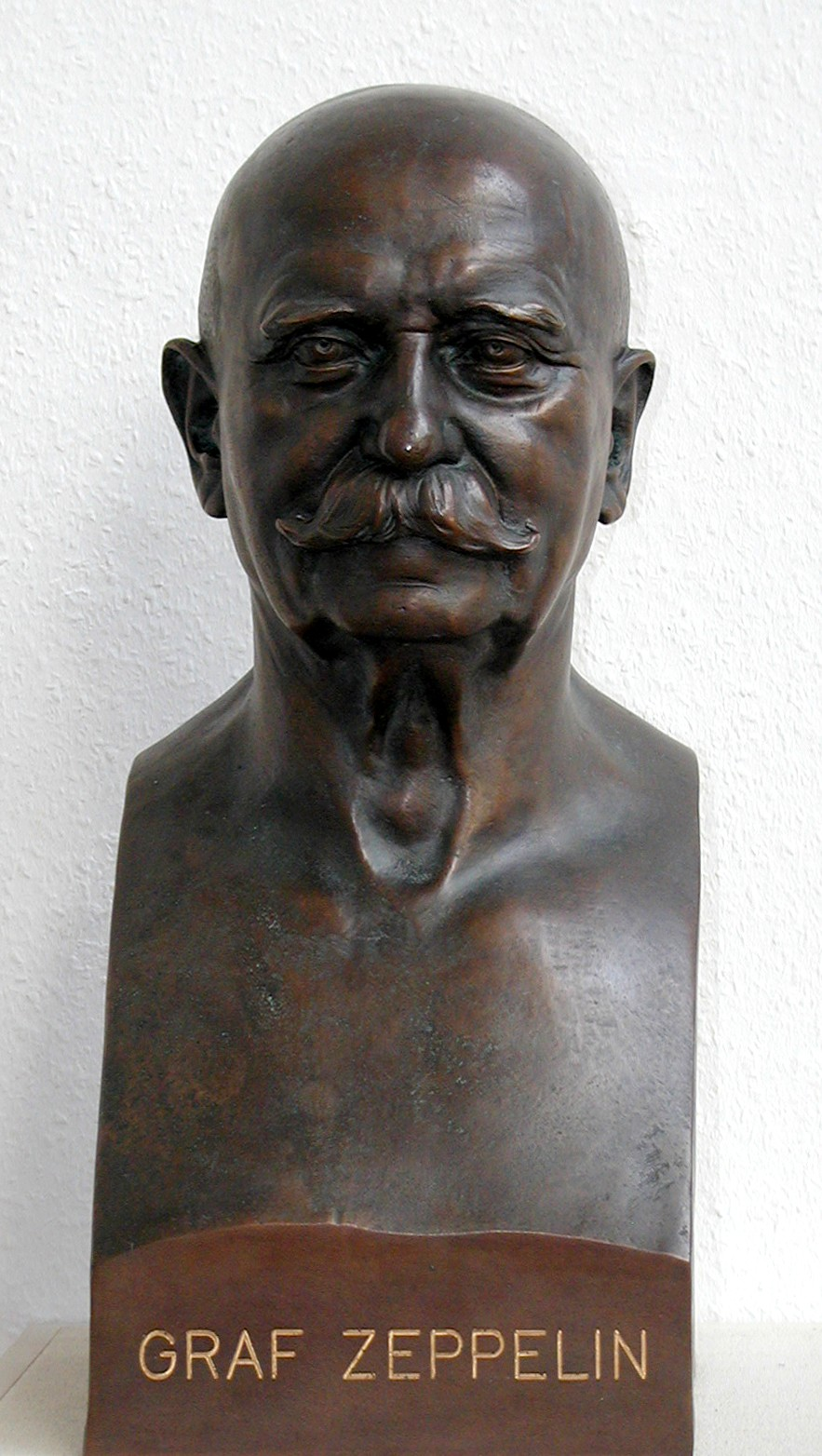
Bust of Zeppelin in the Aeronauticum at Nordholz

Count Zeppelin died early in 1917, before the end of the First World War. He did not live to witness either the provisional shutdown of the Zeppelin project by the Treaty of Versailles or the second resurgence of the Zeppelins under his successor Hugo Eckener. The unfinished Second World War German aircraft carrier Graf Zeppelin, and two rigid airships (the world-circling LZ 127 Graf Zeppelin, and LZ 130 Graf Zeppelin II, twin to the Hindenburg) were named after him.

In 1975, Zeppelin was inducted into the International Air & Space Hall of Fame.

== Cultural references ==
The name of the British rock group Led Zeppelin derives from his airships. His granddaughter Countess Eva von Zeppelin once threatened to sue them for illegal use of their family name while they were performing in Copenhagen.

A 1974 episode of Monty Python's Flying Circus (Series 4, Episode 1, The Golden Age Of Ballooning) features a skit in which Count Zeppelin (Graham Chapman) has taken various members of the government up in his ship for a promotional flight, only to get angry and throw each guest out of the ship's gondola while it is still in the air over the perceived insult of everyone referring to the craft as a balloon instead of his preferred airship or Zeppelin.

== Honours and awards ==
- Honorary citizen of the cities of Friedrichshafen (1907), Konstanz, Worms and Stuttgart (1908), Munich and Lindau (1909), Baden-Baden (1910), and Ulm (1912)
- Honorary doctorates from the Universities of Leipzig, Tübingen (1908) and Dresden
- Honorary member of the Natural History Society of Württemberg, 1910

=== Orders and decorations ===
- Württemberg:
  - Service Award Cross, 1st Class
  - Knight of the Military Merit Order, 18 August 1866; Commander, 1 March 1875; Grand Cross, ca. 1907
  - Knight of Honour of the Württemberg Crown, with Swords, 1870; Commander, 1889; Grand Cross, ca. 1912
  - Commander of the Friedrich Order, 2nd Class, 1883; Grand Cross, 1899
  - Grand Gold Medal for Arts and Sciences, on Band of the Württemberg Crown Order
  - Silver Karl-Olga Medal
  - Silver Jubilee Medal
- Baden:
  - Commander of the Zähringer Lion, 2nd Class, 1876
  - Gold Medal for Arts and Sciences, on Band of the Order of Berthold the First
- Kingdom of Bavaria:
  - Grand Cross of the Military Merit Order
  - Prince Regent Luitpold Medal, in Gold with Crown, 1911
- Brunswick: Gold Medal of Merit for Arts and Sciences
- (Saxe-Coburg and Gotha) (Duchy of Saxe-Altenburg) (Saxe-Meiningen) Ernestine duchies: Grand Cross of the Saxe-Ernestine House Order
- Grand Duchy of Hesse: Grand Cross of the Merit Order of Philip the Magnanimous, with Swords, 24 March 1893
- Mecklenburg:
  - Military Merit Cross, 2nd Class (Schwerin)
  - Grand Cross of the Wendish Crown, with Crown in Gold
- Kingdom of Prussia:
  - Knight of Honour of the Johanniter Order, 22 July 1868; Knight of Justice, 1896
  - Iron Cross (1870), 2nd Class on Black Band; with Jubilee Clip (25 years), 1895
  - War Commemorative Medal of 1870-1871, 1871
  - Knight of the Red Eagle, 3rd Class, 22 April 1883; 2nd Class; Grand Cross
  - Knight of the Royal Crown Order, 2nd Class, 23 September 1885; 1st Class
  - Knight of the Black Eagle, 10 November 1908
  - Pour le Mérite for Arts and Sciences, 22 May 1910
- Saxe-Weimar-Eisenach: Commander of the White Falcon, 1883
- Kingdom of Saxony:
  - Knight of the Albert Order, 1st Class with War Decoration, 1871; Grand Cross, 1889
  - Knight of the Rue Crown
- (Austrian Empire) (Kingdom of Hungary) Austria-Hungary:
  - Knight of the Iron Crown, 3rd Class, 1867
  - Decoration of Honour for Arts and Sciences, 1913
  - Officer of the Order of Franz Joseph, 1913
- Denmark: Grand Cross of the Dannebrog, 18 November 1888
- French Empire: Knight of the Legion of Honour
- Russian Empire:
  - Knight of St. Vladimir, 4th Class; 3rd Class
  - Knight of St. Anna, 2nd Class in Brilliants; 1st Class
  - Knight of the White Eagle

== See also ==
- Airship
- Zeppelin
- Hindenburg disaster
- Timeline of hydrogen technologies
- German inventors and discoverers
- David Schwarz (aviation inventor)
- Cepelinai

== Bibliography ==
- Dooley, Sean C. 2004. The Development of Material-Adapted Structural Form – Part II: Appendices. THÈSE NO 2986 (2004), École Polytechnique Fédérale de Lausanne
- Eckener, Hugo. 1938. Count Zeppelin: The Man and His Work, translated by Leigh Fanell, London – Massie Publishing Company, Ltd. – ASIN B00085KPWK (online extract pp. 155–157, 210–211)
- Lehmann, Ernst A.; Mingos, Howard. 1927. The Zeppelins. The Development of the Airship, with the Story of the Zeppelin Air Raids in the World War. Chapter I – German Airships Prepare for War
- Robinson, Douglas H. Giants in the Sky Henley-on-Thames: Foulis, 1973. ISBN 0854291458
- Vissering, Harry. 1922. Zeppelin: The Story of a Great Achievement
