= Ludwig Dürr =

German airship designer (1878–1956)

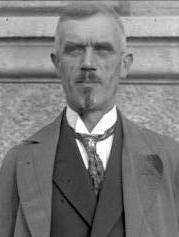
Dr.-Ing. h. c. mult. Dürr in 1929

Ludwig Ferdinand Dürr (4 June 1878 in Stuttgart – 1 January 1956 in Friedrichshafen) was a German airship designer.

== Life and career ==
After completing training as a mechanic, Dürr continued his training at the Königliche Baugewerkschule (Royal School of Engineering). In 1898 he entered the German Navy, but was discharged at the end of the year.

Beginning in 1899, Dürr worked for Ferdinand von Zeppelin. After assisting in the construction of the first zeppelin airship, the LZ 1, he himself began to construct airships and lightweight construction parts. All of the following zeppelin designs were Dürr's. He often flew on board his designs, at the elevator control wheel, including the maiden flight of Zeppelin LZ 5 to Bitterfeld and back. On 31 May 1909, Dürr was still at the elevator controls after the 37 hour flight, when the nose of the ship crashed into a pear tree near Göppingen. He was employed by the Zeppelin company until its dissolution in 1945, from 1915 on as technical director.

On 19 July 1923, he married Lydia Beck; they had two daughters and two sons.

== Honours ==
- Great Cross of Merit of the Federal Republic of Germany (1953)
- Honorary doctorates from Technical Universities and Universities of Freiburg, Heidelberg, Karlsruhe, Stuttgart, Tübingen and Graz
- Honorary citizen of Friedrichshafen and Stuttgart-Echterdingen (now part of Leinfelden-Echterdingen)
- Ludwig-Dürr-Straße in Göppingen is named after him.
- The Ludwig Dürr School in Friedrichshafen, a primary and secondary school with Werkrealschule year, is named after him.
- The high Alpine trail between the Friedrichshafen and Darmstadt huts in the Verwall Alps is named the Ludwig-Dürr-Weg after him.

== Sources ==
- Schmitt, G. and Schwipps, W.: Pioniere der frühen Luftfahrt, Blindlach: Gondrom Verlag, 1995, ISBN 3-8112-1189-7
- Wolfgang von Zeppelin: Ludwig Ferdinand Dürr – Das erfüllte Leben des großen Ingenieurs beim Luftschiffbau Zeppelin, 2013, ISBN 978-3981520439
