= Günter Katzenberger =

German musicologist and conductor (1937–2020)

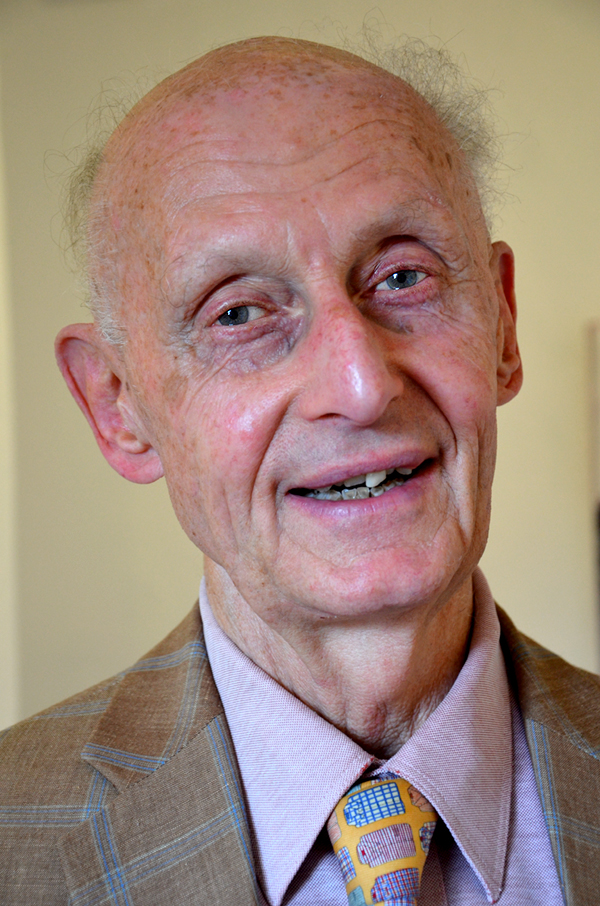
- Katzenberger in 2014
- Born: 15 May 1937 (age 88)
- Scientific career
- Fields: Music history
- Institutions: University of Leipzig

Günter Katzenberger (25 May 1937 – 28 December 2020) was a German musician, musicologist, conductor, and university faculty, professor for Historical musicology at the Hochschule für Musik, Theater und Medien Hannover as well as a non fiction writer and publisher.

== Life and career ==
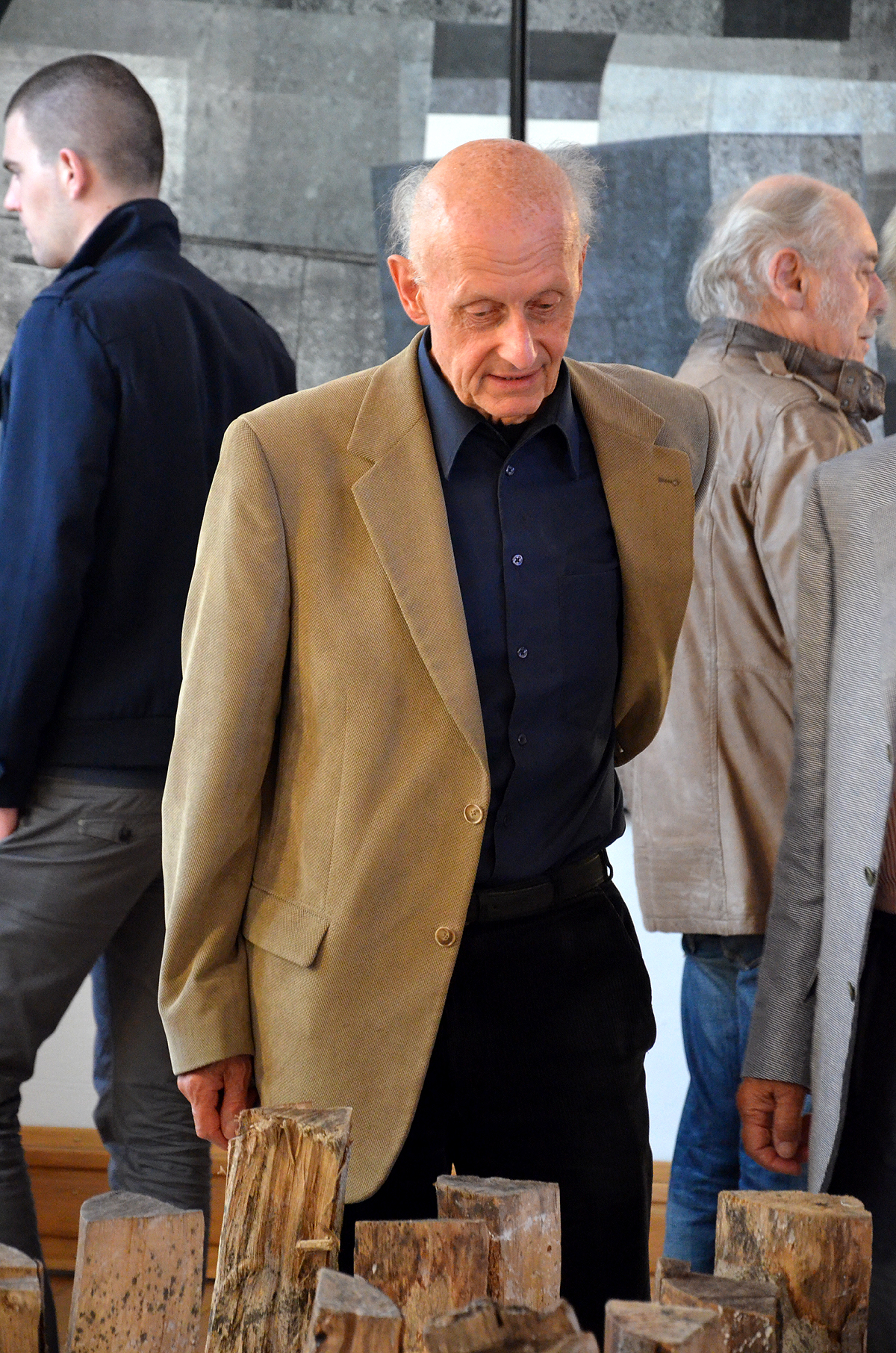
Katzenberger at a vernissage of a retrospective of the artist János Nádasdy in 2014 at Schloss Landestrost

Born in Bad Kissingen, Katzenberger first studied in Munich at the local University of Music and Drama as well as musicology, philosophy and modern history. He then studied under professors Wilhelm Fischer, Erich Valentin and Hans Zingerle at the University of Innsbruck, where he received his doctorate in historical musicology and passed his concert examination in conducting.

From 1963 onwards, Katzenberger taught at various Gymnasium in Munich and Mühldorf am Inn, performing concerts in parallel as a chamber musician, song accompanist and orchestra leader.

From 1970, Katzenberger taught at the Hanover University of Music, Theatre and Media (HMTM Hanover), where he was appointed professor of Historical Musicology in 1973, in combination with music education. He worked as lecturer at the same time at the University of Hildesheim and the University of Bremen. In 1976, he also took over an honorary professorship in musicology at the Gottfried Wilhelm Leibniz Universität Hannover.

Until his retirement in 2002, Katzenberger headed the Hannoverscher Künstlerverein as its chairman for many years and was also deputy chairman of the Hannoversche Gesellschaft für Neue Musik.

In addition to various contributions to the encyclopaedia Die Musik in Geschichte und Gegenwart (MGG) and the work Das Händel-Lexikon Katzenberger published in numerous papers.

Katzenberger died on 28 December 2020, at the age of 83.

== Publications ==
- Instrumente, Klänge, Strukturen. Ein Taschenbuch zur gleichnamigen Sendereihe von Siegfried Behrend, mit Zeichnungen von Karl Schilling. Schroedel, Hanover 1972, ISBN 3-507-08302-7.
- Günter Katzenberger (ed.): Heinrich Sievers zum 70. Geburtstag / in Verbindung mit Richard Jakoby. Schneider, Tutzing 1978, ISBN 3-7952-0261-2.
- as ed., Katharina Hottmann (Bearb.): "Unser Hof ist ein sehr starker Gott ..." Hannovers Oper um 1850 im Spannungsfeld zwischen Künstlern, König und Hofbeamten. Mit zahlreichen unveröffentlichten Dokumenten und Briefen von Heinrich Marschner und anderen. Die Personalakte Heinrich Marschners aus dem Theatermuseum Hannover (Prinzenstraße. Doppelheft 13). 1st edition. Niedersächsische Staatstheater Hannover in Kooperation mit dem Theatermuseum und -Archiv, Hanover 1988, ISBN 3-931266-12-5.
- as ed.: Was hat die Französische Revolution für Musik und Ästhetik bewirkt? Beiträge zu einem Französisch-Deutschen Kolloquium im Mai 1989 an der Hochschule für Musik und Theater Hannover anlässlich des "Bicentenaire de la Révolution Française". Hochschule für Musik und Theater Hannover, Hannover [1989], DNB-IDN 946280126.
- with Hans-Olaf Meyer-Grotjahn (Red.): Sofia Gubaidulina. Eine Hommage zum 60. Geburtstag, edited by the Hannoverschen Gesellschaft für Neue Musik e.V. (HGNM). HGNM, Hanover 1991.
  - Neuauflage: Pfau, Saarbrücken 2000, ISBN 3-89727-120-6.
- Hinrich Bergmeier, Günter Katzenberger (ed.): Kulturaustreibung. Die Einflussnahme des Nationalsozialismus auf Kunst und Kultur in Niedersachsen. eine Dokumentation zur gleichnamigen Ausstellung der Hannoverschen Gesellschaft für Neue Musik in Zusammenarbeit mit dem Sprengel Museum in Hanover und dem Landesmuseum Hannover in the Georg-von-Cölln-Haus 7. September bis 28. Oktober 1993. Dölling und Galitz, Hamburg 1993, ISBN 3-926174-70-6, p. 55 u.ö. (Vorschau über Google Books)
- as ed.: Reinhard Febel. Beiträge zu seinem musikalischen Schaffen. Ricordi, Feldkirchen 1994, ISBN 3-9803090-4-5.
- with Arnfried Edler (ed.): Denken und Sprechen als Weg zur Musik. Beiträge zur Musikgeschichte (IfMpF-Monographie. Vol. 8). Institut für Musikpädagogische Forschung der Hochschule für Musik und Theater, Hannover 2003, ISBN 3-931852-64-4.
- with Wolfgang Horn (ed.): Musik zwischen Mythologie und Sozialgeschichte. Ausgewählte Aufsätze aus den Jahren 1972 bis 2000 (Publikationen der Hochschule für Musik und Theater Hannover. Band 13). Wißner, Augsburg 2003, ISBN 3-89639-379-0.
- with Hans Bäßler: Wegbegleiter im Diskurs / Musikhistorisches Kolloquium von Kollegen und Freunden Arnfried Edlers am 12. April 2003 Hochschule für Musik und Theater Hannover (IfMpF-Monographie. Vol. 7). Institut für Musikpädagogische Forschung, Hannover 2004, ISBN 3-931852-70-9.
- Bemerkungen zur Bedeutung von Pausen als Spannungs- und Überraschungsmoment in der Instrumentalmusik um 1800. In Charlotte Seither in Zusammenarbeit mit der Hochschule für Musik und Theater Hanover (ed.): Tacet. Non tacet. Zur Rhetorik des Schweigens. Festschrift für Peter Becker zum 70. Geburtstag. Pfau, Saarbrücken 2004, ISBN 3-89727-265-2.
- Kürze als Problem für das Musikhören im frühen 19. Jahrhundert. In Claudia Bullerjahn, H. Gembris, A. C. Lehmann (ed.): Musik: gehört, gesehen und erlebt. Festschrift Klaus-Ernst Behne zum 65. Geburtstag (IfMpF-Monografie. Vol. 12). IfMpF, Hanover 2005, ISBN 3-931852-69-5.
- with Stefan Weiss (ed.): Musik in und um Hannover. Peter Schnaus zum 70. Geburtstag (IfMpF-Monographie. Nr. 14). Institut für Musikpädagogische Forschung der Hochschule für Musik und Theater Hannover, 2006, ISBN 3-931852-74-1.
