= Heinrich Sievers =

German academic, music critic and conductor

Heinrich Sievers (20 August 1908 – 17 September 1999) was a German musicologist, music critic, university lecturer, and conductor. He was regarded as an authority on the history of music in Hanover and Lower Saxony, and wrote music-historical monographs in English and Finnish publications.

== Life ==
Sievers was born in the small town of Dorum at the North Sea during the time of the German Empire, but spent his youth in the towns of Goslar and Peine. After finishing school, he began studying musicology in northern Bavaria at the University of Würzburg during the time of the Weimar Republic, becoming a member of the musical student association there and which is part of the Sondershausen Association. During his studies in 1931, Sievers discovered the Wienhausen Songbook from the year 1460 in the archive of the Wienhausen Abbey, which he published two decades later as a facsimile. From 1932, Sievers continued his studies in Cologne, completing his Doctor of Philosophy degree in 1935 at the University of Cologne with his musicological research entitled 'the Latin liturgical Easter plays of the collegiate church of St. Blaise in Brunswick' (German: Die lateinischen liturgischen Osterspiele der Stiftskirche St. Blasien zu Braunschweig).

From 1937 Sievers worked in Brunswick as a music critic, and in 1939, the year that the Second World War began, commenced working in Hanover at the conservatory that would become the Hanover University of Music, Drama and Media (HMTMH). Parallel to his work at the conservatory, in 1946 Sievers started working at the precursor of the State Library of Lower Saxony within the British Occupation Zone in post-war Germany. He also taught at the Hanover School of Church Music.

In 1954 Sievers succeeded the chemist and university lecturer Walter Scheele as conductor of the collegium musicum, the symphony orchestra of the later Leibniz University Hannover (LUH). In 1959 Sievers was appointed professor of musicology at the Lower Saxon College for Music and Theatre, a precursor of HMTMH, where he was also responsible for the department of church music. In the same year he was appointed honorary professor at the Hanover Technical College that would eventually become LUH. In addition, he again worked as a critic in magazines and daily newspapers such as the Hannoversche Allgemeine Zeitung. From 1960 until 1968 he was music director of the Sondershausen Association.

Sievers researched the history of music, especially that of Hanover and Lower Saxony, for almost his entire life. His numerous essays, reviews, books and appearances in radio broadcasts were reflected in several publications. Among his most important publications are The Music in Hanover (Die Musik in Hannover) from 1961, Curious Music (Italian: Musica curiosa) from 1970, Chamber Music in Hanover (Kammermusik in Hannover) from 1980 and the entry for Hanover in the 1st edition of the encyclopedia Music in History and the Present (Musik in Geschichte und Gegenwart). His two volumes of the Hanoverian Music History (Hannoversche Musikgeschichte) published in 1979 and 1984 are a standard work.

Sievers died in Garatshausen in Upper Bavaria in 1999 at the age of 91.

== Honours ==
- Awarded Grand Cross of Merit of the Order of Merit of Lower Saxony
- Appointed honorary member of Hannoverscher Oratorienchor
- Honored with "Fokke-Pollmann-Medal" by "Sängerbund Nordwestdeutschland" in 1984

== Writings ==
- Die lateinischen liturgischen Osterspiele der Stiftskirche St. Blasien zu Braunschweig. Eine musikwissenschaftliche Untersuchung …. (Veröffentlichungen der Niedersächsischen Musikgeschichte, issue 2, Kallmeyer: Wolfenbüttel), plus Dissertation 1935 at the University of Würzburg, 1936
- Heinrich Sievers, Albert Trapp, Alexander Schum: 250 Jahre Braunschweigisches Staatstheater, 1690–1940. edited by the Braunschweigischen Landesstelle für Heimatforschung und Heimatpflege, Braunschweig: Appelhans, 1941
- Heinrich Sievers (ed.): Bach-Jahr 1950, edited by the Landeshauptstadt Hannover
  - Folge 1: November 1949 bis März 1950, Hanover: Osterwald, 1949
- Hannoversche Musikgeschichte. Dokumente, Kritiken und Meinungen. Tutzing: Schneider
  - Vol. 1: Von den Anfängen bis zu den Befreiungskriegen, 1979, ISBN 978-3-7952-0282-8 and ISBN 3-7952-0282-5
  - Vol. 2: Vom Ende des 18. Jahrhunderts bis zur Auflösung des Königreichs Hannover, 1984, ISBN 978-3-7952-0396-2 and ISBN 3-7952-0396-1
- Die Musik in Hannover. Die musikalischen Strömungen in Niedersachsen vom Mittelalter bis zur Gegenwart unter besonderer Berücksichtigung der Musikgeschichte der Landeshauptstadt Hannover., 168 partly illustrated pages with music samples and a phonograph record, published on the occasion of the 325th anniversary of the Opera House Orchestra by the Society of Friends of the Opera House Orchestra, Hanover: Sponholtz, 1961
- Kammermusik in Hannover. Historisches, Gegenwärtiges – Kritiken, Meinungen. Unter besonderer Berücksichtigung des Wirkens der Hannoverschen Kammermusik-Gemeinde 1929–1979, Tutzing: Schneider Verlag, 1980
- Prisma der Musikgeschichte. Tutzing: Schneider, 1983, ISBN 978-3-7952-0393-1 and ISBN 3-7952-0393-7; Table of contents

as publisher:

- Musik im Weltbild, Book series of the Braunschweigische Staatsmusikschule and the Landesmusikschule Hanover, Hanover: Hahnsche Buchhandlung, 1947
- Das Wienhäuser Liederbuch. 2 volumes in facsimile, Wolfenbüttel: Möseler, 1954
- A. A. H. H. Sievers: "Musica curiosa. Neu eröffnetes musicalisch-historisches Rarietäten Cabinet, worin nicht nur einem würcklichen galant-homme, der eben kein Professions-Verwandter, sondern auch manchem Musico selbst die alleraufrichtigste und deutlichste Vorstellung musicalischer Scharteken, wie sich dieselben vom Schulstaub tüchtig gesäubert, eigentlich und wahrhafftig verhalten, ertheilet, auch ein blühend wohlriechend Würtzgärtlein Historiae Musicae, mit Ehr- und Lehr-, Schertz- und Schmertz-, Leid- und Freuden-Gewächsen, welche zu unterschiedl. Zeiten gepflantzet, nunmehr aber allen vernünfftigen Liebhabern zu sonderbarem Gefallen zu hauffe gesamlet u. in die offenbahre Welt ausgestreuet" (Musica curiosa. Newly opened musical-historical rarities cabinet, in which not only a dignified galant-homme, who is not related to any profession, but also many a Musico himself has the most sincere and clearest idea of musical gangsters, how they behave in a proper and truthful way, cleaned from the school dust, is also told by a blooming, fragrant little spice garden Historiae Musicae, with plants of honour and teaching, of jokes and pain, of suffering and joy, which are too different from each other. Planted at different times, but now to all reasonable lovers to strange favour to be spread out to the open world, 191 partly illustrated pages with examples of music, 2nd, changed and enlarged edition, Tutzing: Schneider, 1971, ISBN 978-3-7952-0100-5 and ISBN 3-7952-0100-4
- Scurrilia in musica. Ergetzliches aus allerlei Journalen. Tutzing: Schneider, 1988, ISBN 978-3-7952-0569-0 and ISBN 3-7952-0569-7

== Literature ==
- Günter Katzenberger (ed.): Heinrich Sievers zum 70. Geburtstag. In cooperation with Richard Jakoby. Tutzing: Schneider, 1978, ISBN 978-3-7952-0261-3 and ISBN 3-7952-0261-2; Inhaltsverzeichnis
- Rita Seidel: Catalogus professorum 1831–1981. Festschrift zum 150jährigen Bestehen der Universität Hannover, edited on behalf of the President, University of Hannover, Stuttgart; Berlin; Cologne; Mainz: Kohlhammer, 1981, ISBN 3-17-007321-4, p. 298.
- Helga Fredebold: Ein Rössinger Original, Heinrich Sievers. In Hildesheimer Heimat-Kalender: Kalender für Familie und Haus. Jahrbuch für Kunst und Wissenschaft im Hildesheimer Land, Hildesheim: Gerstenberg, 1998, ISSN 0340-8477.
- Werner Sührig: Ostfälisches Platt im Hildesheimer Land. Das Sievers-Kese'sche Gesamtwerk. (Veröffentlichungen des Landschaftsverbandes Hildesheim, vol. 13), Hildesheim [among others]: Olms, 2002, p. 167
