= Reinhard Febel =

German composer, notable for his operas

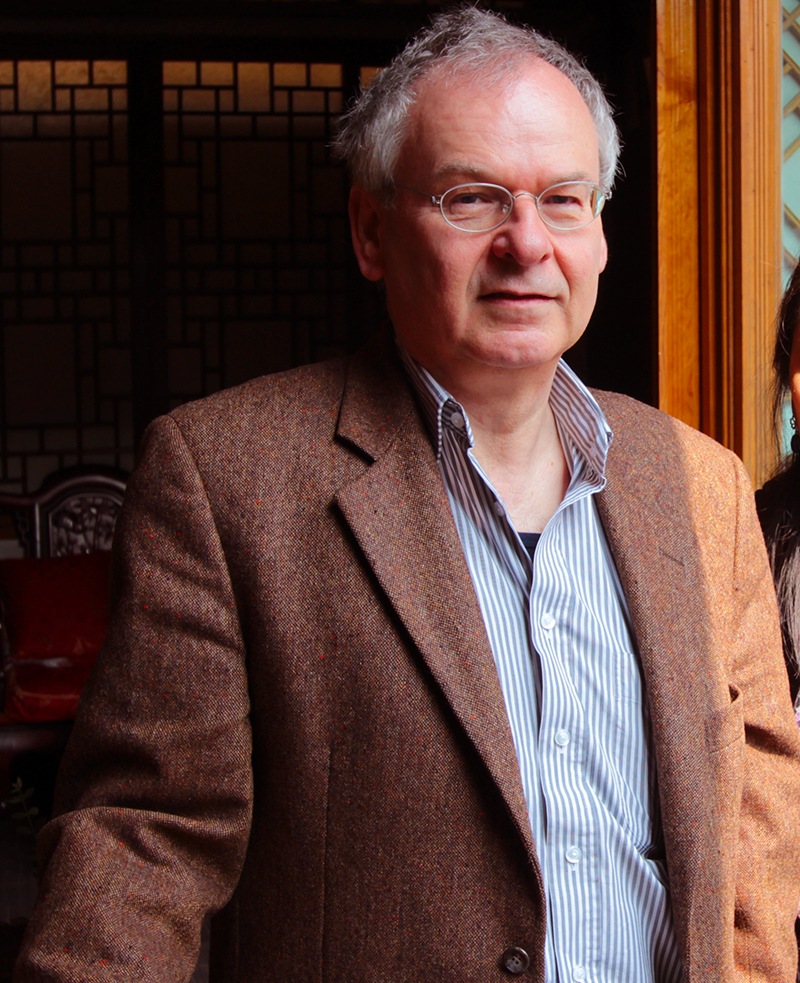
- Febel visiting Gahoe-dong 31–79 in Seoul on 28 March 2012
- Born: 3 July 1952 (age 74); Metzingen
- Education: Musikhochschule Stuttgart; Hochschule für Musik Freiburg; IRCAM
- Occupations: Composer; Academic teacher
- Organizations: Hochschule für Musik, Theater und Medien Hannover; Mozarteum
- Awards: Beethoven Prize; Villa Massimo

Reinhard Febel (born 3 July 1952) is a German composer, notable for his operas. He is also a music theorist and a university professor at the Hochschule für Musik, Theater und Medien Hannover and the Mozarteum.

== Career ==
Febel was born in Metzingen, Baden-Württemberg, and first studied music and piano with Jürgen Uhde at the Musikhochschule Stuttgart. On a recommendation from Helmut Lachenmann he studied composition from 1979, with Klaus Huber at the Hochschule für Musik Freiburg and at the IRCAM in Paris where he attended courses in electronic music in 1982. On a commission of the Bayerische Staatsoper he composed the chamber opera Euridice, premiered in 1983. He described his work "The musical world of Euridice is a hybrid of instrumentation, pastiche, collage, composition, sound-noise, and song-language-speech particles." He worked from 1983 to 1988 as a freelance composer in London, in 1984 in Rome on a scholarship of the Villa Massimo. In 1985 his Symphony, composed for the Youth Orchestra of the European Community, was premiered at the Donaueschinger Musiktage.

In 1989 he took over the Chair of Composition and Music Theory at the Hochschule für Musik und Theater Hannover. In 1992 his opera in three acts Sekunden und Jahre des Caspar Hauser (Seconds and years of Caspar Hauser) on a libretto by Lukas Hemleb was premiered at the Opernhaus Dortmund. In 1996 WERGO recorded his Variations for Orchestra, Das Unendliche (The Infinite) for mezzo-soprano, baritone and orchestra, and his first string quartet, played by the Arditti Quartet. Joseph Stevenson described Variations for Orchestra as "a highly individual, strikingly mysterious one-movement orchestral piece in a post-modern style that mixes tonality and atonality in a freely chromatic technique." Das Unendliche on a poem by Giacomo Leopardi begins with an instrumental reference to the opera Euridice. The string quartet shows elements of American Minimal music and is written in a notation of eight lines, two for each player. In 2003 Wolkenstein, Lieder und Chöre nach Texten und Melodien des Oswald von Wolkenstein (Wolkenstein, songs and choruses after texts and tunes of Oswald von Wolkenstein) was first performed at the Berliner Philharmonie. Triptychon is a "Kammermusiktheater für zwei Sänger, zwei Schauspieler und Kammerorchester nach drei Gemälden von Frida Kahlo, Edward Hopper und Diego Velázquez" (chamber music theater for two singers, two actors and chamber orchestra on three paintings by Frida Kahlo, Edward Hopper and Diego Velázquez) on a text by the composer. The three parts are entitled "Frida", "Gespensterhaus" (Ghost house) and "Raum 17" (Room 17). The opera was premiered in 2009 at the Opernhaus Kiel.

Over the years he spent periods of study, teaching and composing abroad, including in South America (Chile, Peru, Uruguay, Argentina), New Zealand, South Africa (University of Natal) and Cameroon, and in cities such as Skopje, Edinburgh and Riga. Since 1997 he has been professor of composition at the Mozarteum University of Salzburg.

== Stage works ==
Premiere	Title	Description	Libretto and source
10 Nov 1983, Munich, Bayerische Staatsoper	Euridice	Chamber opera, 80'	Helmut Danninger, after Ottavio Rinuccini's libretto for Jacopo Peri
15 May 1988, Opernhaus Kiel	Nacht mit Gästen	Music-theatre	the composer after the eponymous play by Peter Weiss
12 Apr 1992, Opernhaus Dortmund	Sekunden und Jahre des Caspar Hauser	Opera in three acts and nine scenes	Lukas Hemleb
6 Nov 1994, Staatstheater Darmstadt	Morels Erfindung	Opera in one act	Lukas Hemleb, after La invención de Morel by Adolfo Bioy Casares
14 Sep 1996, Theater Hagen	Beauty	Music-theatre	Lukas Hemleb, after a newspaper article
20 Dec 2005, WDR Köln	Desert Inn	Radio play	
10 May 2001, Oper Bonn	Besuchszeit	Music-theatre for three actors and music, 60'	the composer
22 Mar 2003, Philharmonie Berlin	Wolkenstein	Lieder after texts and melodies of Oswald von Wolkenstein	additional texts by the composer
1 Aug 2005, Toihaus Salzburg / TRT Taschenopern-Festival	Frida	20'. Ein Traumbild after Unos quantos piquetitos by Frida Kahlo	the composer
1 Aug 2007, Toihaus Salzburg / TRT Taschenopern-Festival	Gespensterhaus	Kammermusiktheater, 30'. Ein Horrorbild after Haunted House by Edward Hopper	the composer
16 May 2009, Opernhaus Kiel	Raum 17	Music-theatre after the Rokeby Venus by Diego Velázquez	the composer
1 Aug 2007, Toihaus Salzburg / TRT Taschenopern-Festival	Gespensterhaus	Kammermusiktheater, 30'. Ein Horrorbild after Haunted House by Edward Hopper	the composer
16 May 2009, Opernhaus Kiel	Raum 17	Music-theatre after the Rokeby Venus by Diego Velázquez	the composer
3 June 2023, Landestheater Linz	Benjamin Button	Opera after Benjamin Button by F. Scott Fitzgerald	the composer

Frida, Gespensterhaus and Raum 17 were presented as Triptychon, an operatic triptych based on paintings.

Febel's works have been published by Ricordi.

== Awards ==
- 1980 Beethoven Prize of Bonn
- 1984 Villa Massimo
- 1988 Johann-Wenzel-Stamitz-Preis

== Publications ==
- Reinhard Febel: Musik für zwei Klaviere seit 1950 als Spiegel der Kompositionstechnik. Pfau Verlag, Saarbrücken 1998.
- Rainer Nonnemann (ed.) and Reinhard Febel: Alles ständig in Bewegung: Texte zur Musik 1976–2003. Pfau Verlag, Saarbrücken 2004.

== Literature ==
- Günter Katzenberger (editor): Reinhard Febel. Beiträge zu seinem musikalischen Schaffen. Hannoversche Gesellschaft für Neue Musik. Ricordi, Feldkirchen 1994, ISBN 3-9803090-4-5.
