= Carl Berg (airship builder) =

German entrepreneur and airship builder

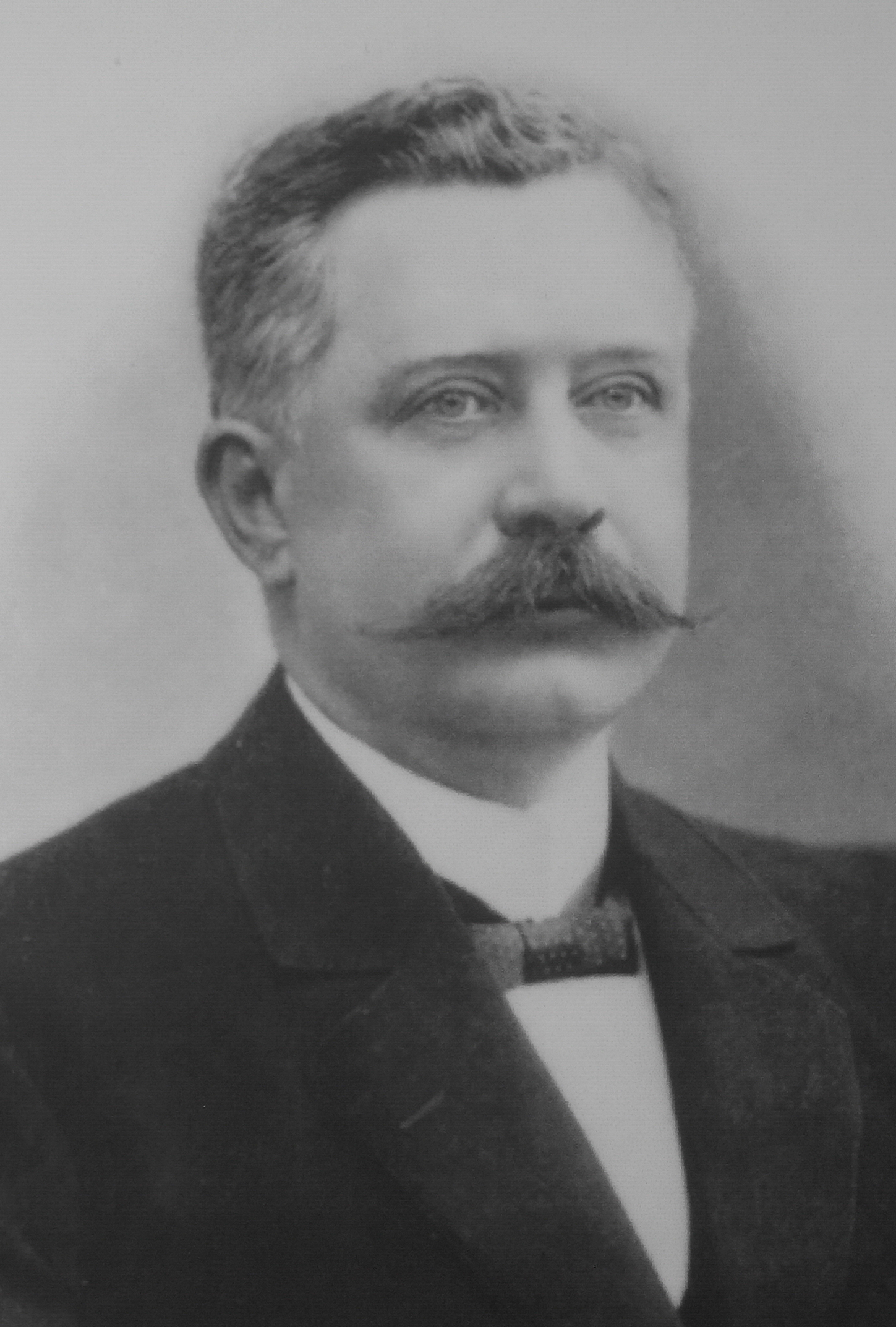
Carl Berg

Carl Berg (4 February 1851, Lüdenscheid – 26 May 1906, Bonn) was a German entrepreneur and airship builder.

Berg came from a commercial iron-works family. His great-grandfather founded a button-making factory on 1786 in Lüdenscheid. In the following generations the factory developed into an important metal-working company. Among others it incorporated a brass works and an iron works in Eveking (today Werdohl).

After his father's death Carl Berg, at the age of 20, took over the firm and expanded it further. Early on he recognised the opportunities in the electrical industries and delivered special wire for the Post to use for telegraph and telephone. Other non-ferrous metals were developed.

Berg founded as subsidiaries the copperworks "Deutschland" in Berlin and "Österreich" in Außig (part of Cavertitz, in Bohemia). Above all he realised the advantages of aluminium as a light building material and his Lüdenscheid firm became a pioneer of the aluminium industry.

In 1892 Berg delivered material to the airship constructor David Schwarz for his first aluminium rigid dirigible in Russia, 1892 to 1894, and also for Schwarz's second aluminium airship in Berlin, 1895 to 1897. Berg's firm constructed the framework and separate parts. After Schwarz's death, Carl Berg worked with the Schwarz's widow to complete construction of the second airship up to its partially successful test flight.

By the end of 1897 Ferdinand Graf von Zeppelin had discussed possible airship design with Berg, and together with Philipp Holzman in May 1898 they formed the joint stock company Gesellschaft zur Förderung der Luftschiffart. Zeppelin contributed 800,000 Marks, almost half the capital. After building the first Zeppelin in a floating hangar on Lake Constance and executing three test flights, the shareholders were reluctant to invest more and the company was liquidated in 1900.

Berg continued to provide materials for Zeppelin's airships.

== Aluminium alloys ==
For the Schwarz airship Berg used an alloy of unknown composition named Viktoria aluminium. For the Zeppelin LZ 1, Zeppelin's first design, he used pure aluminium. For Zeppelin LZ 2 to LZ 25 Berg used aluminium alloyed with zinc and zinc-copper. Berg also produced duralumin, an alloy with copper, manganese and magnesium invented by Alfred Wilm. Zeppelin immediately wished to use this superior alloy, but it had technical difficulties not satisfactorily resolved until 1915 when it was used in LZ 26.

== Death ==
After Berg's death in 1906, Zeppelin became the customer of Carl Berg AG (operated from 1906 until 1926).
