= Carolina Brauckmann =

German historian and liedermacher

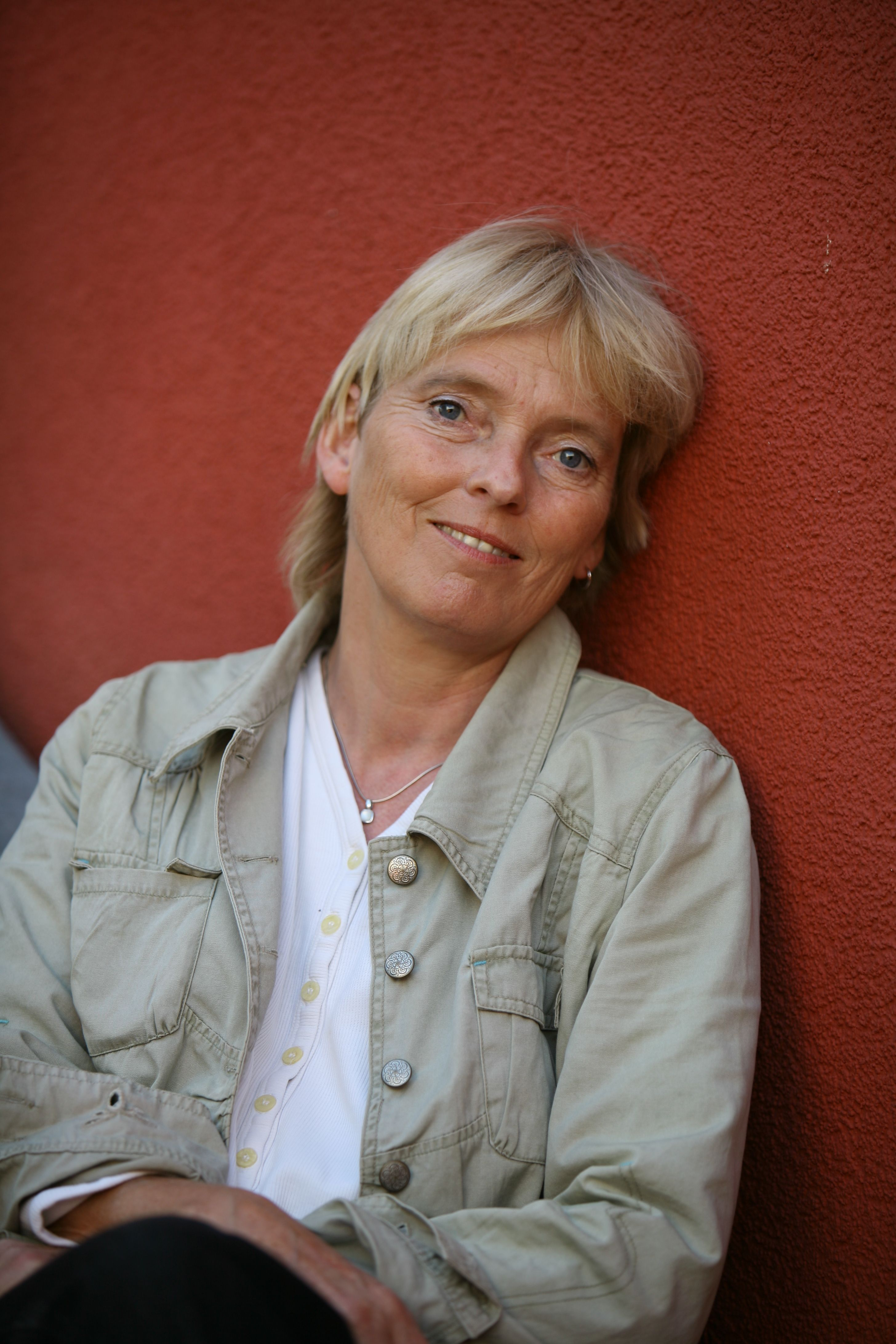
Image of Carolina Brauckmann

Carolina Brauckmann (born 26 June 1954) is a German singer-songwriter and historian. Since the early 1980s, she has produced over a hundred titles and is considered Germany's best-known lesbian singer-songwriter or "Grande Dame des lesbischen Chansons".

== Career ==
Brauckmann grew up as the youngest of six children in Lüdenscheid. After graduating from high school, she studied German studies in Freiburg im Breisgau German Studies, History and English Studies at the Albert-Ludwigs-University. During this time, she was a member of the editorial team of the Freiburg women's newspaper for six years, and was involved in the women's rights scene. Together with Sully Roecken, she conducted research at the Stadtarchiv Freiburg, the two academics published the work Margaretha Jedefrau in 1989, which deals with women's history and attracted national attention. She then worked for seven years at the Feminist Archive in Cologne and was, among other things, co-owner of an internet agency. Co-owner of an internet agency.

In 1982, she released her first album Satirische Lesbengesänge (Satirical Lesbian Songs) about the lives of lesbian women and made her stage debut as a singer in 1983. In retrospect, the combination of lesbian life and humour is highlighted as a special feature of her style. The second album followed in 1986 as an LP and, after a break of ten years, four CDs. In the course of her more than thirty-year career as a composer and musician, she has given numerous concerts in Germany, Austria and Switzerland, both in alternative or subcultural spaces – such as besetzte Häuser in the 1980s – and nationwide in established venues such as the Jazzhaus Freiburg or the Kulturzentrum Schlachthof in Kassel.

In 2003 she received the Osnabrück Rosa-Courage-Prize of the oldest continuously held gay and lesbian cultural festival in Germany. She performed at the opening of the Gay Games in Cologne, and also gave a concert at the opening of Women Pride as part of Cologne Pride 2012.

More recently, Brauckmann has also worked as a freelance communications trainer and moderator; her political commitment has developed from feminist women's politics to the lesbian-gay emancipation movement for example as state coordinator for older gays and lesbians in North Rhine-Westphalia.

Carolina Brauckmann lives and works in Cologne.

== Discography ==
- Satirische Lesbengesänge Vol. 1. Über feministische Utopien und lesbischen Alltag, LP, 1982
- Satirische Lesbengesänge Vol. 2. LP, 1982
- Lesbisch makes the world go round. CD, 1994
- Lesben wie Du und Sie. CD, 1995
- Weil ich die Frauen liebe ... CD, 2003
- The Best Of – 25 Jahre Satirische Lesbengesänge.
- The L – Sound.Neue Songs. mit Nicole Sperrmann (Kontrabass). CD, 2013

== Publications ==
- Margaretha Jedefrau (with Sully Roecken); Kore-Verlag, 490 p., Freiburg/Breisgau 1989, ISBN 3-926023-15-5
