= Deutscher Musikrat =

German organization for music associations

Deutscher Musikrat German Music Council
- Abbreviation: DMR
- Formation: 13 June 1953; 73 years ago
- Type: Nongovernmental organization
- Headquarters: Bonn, North Rhine-Westphalia, Germany
- Region served: Germany
- Services: Umbrella organisation
- Fields: Music
- Parent organization: International Music Council
- Website: www.musikrat.de

The Deutscher Musikrat (DMR, German Music Council; German: [ˈdɔʏtʃər muːˈziːk rat]) is an umbrella organization for music associations and the 16 music councils of the German federal states. It represents over 14 million music-loving citizens who, for professional reasons or as amateurs, are affiliated with the Musikrat and its member organizations. With more than 100 member associations, institutions and numerous personalities, it acts, together with its projects and support measures, as an advisor and competence centre for politics and civil society.

The council acts as the National Committee of the Federal Republic of Germany in the International Music Council of UNESCO. The patron of the non-profit association is the President of Germany. It runs competitions such as Jugend musiziert, Jugend jazzt and the Deutscher Musikwettbewerb, and nationwide orchestras such as the Bundesjugendorchester. It is based in Berlin and Bonn.

== History ==
On 13 June 1953, a German section of the International Music Council was founded in Bonn, on the initiative of the "Arbeitsgemeinschaft für Musikerziehung und Musikpflege" and the German UNESCO Commission. It was called Deutsche Sektion des Internationalen Musikrates. Shortly afterwards, at the General Assembly of the International Music Council, the German section was recognised as a "National Committee". Based on this, the task was conceived from the outset to be of equally international and national importance. This claim was reinforced in 1956 with the official name "Deutscher Musikrat – Deutsche Sektion des Internationalen Musikrates" (German Music Council - German Section of the International Music Council). Since the 1960s, it has continuously expanded its support programme. The "Jugend musiziert" (Youth make music) competition project was founded in 1964 to promote young musicians in Germany. Five years later, the Bundesjugendorchester was founded as a national youth orchestra, easing the way for young musicians into professional life.

In the German Democratic Republic (GDR), a similar organisation was founded in Berlin in 1962, called Musikrat der DDR (Music Council of the GDR). It was mainly dedicated to the development of international relations while the Verband Deutscher Komponisten und Musikwissenschaftler (Association of German composers and musicologists) took over the tasks within the GDR. In 1990, after the Wende, the boards of the two German music councils met for the first time and discussed the prerequisites for a merger. All supported projects supported were immediately extended to the new federal states in the former GDR.

As a result of the merger, the headquarters of the DMR is in Berlin, with a focus on political work, while the supported projects are managed by a non-profit project company in Bonn. It is the largest umbrella organization of music, representing around 14 million people related to music in Germany.

On the occasion of the organization's 50th anniversary, a commemorative stamp was issued on 12 June 2003.

== Focus ==
Together with its partners, the DMR is committed to all areas of social life that are connected to music, including raising awareness of the value of creativity, providing impulses for musical life open to all forms of musical expression, promoting young people, and selecting areas of national importance.

According to the council's information, the focal points of its music-political work are the promotion of both professional musicians and amateurs, of young musicians, contemporary music, and information about music in Germany and its documentation.

In addition, the DMR runs national orchestras such as the Bundesjugendorchester and Bundesjazzorchester. It organises various competitions, including Jugend musiziert, Jugend jazzt and the Deutscher Musikwettbewerb. Together with the broadcaster ARD and the Landesmusikrat, the Deutscher Chorwettbewerb is held every four years.

== Documentation about competitions, anniversaries and events ==
- Brigitta Ritter (editor): Musik in der Ganztagsschule. Dokumentation des internationalen Kongresses des Deutschen Musikrates in Verbindung mit dem Verband Deutscher Schulmusiker. Königstein 2004. Hochschule für Musik und Theater, Hannover 2004.
- 10 Jahre Dirigentenforum des Deutschen Musikrates 1991-2001. Bonn und Berlin 2001.
- Klaus Bernbacher, Detlef Müller-Hennig (editor): Dokumentation 20 Jahre Konzert des Deutschen Musikrates. Bonn 2000.
- 33 Jahre Wettbewerbe „Jugend musiziert“. Bestandsaufnahme und weitere Planung. Dokumentation der „Jugend musiziert“ Zentralkonferenz in Neuss im November 1996. Munich 1996.
- Peter Linzenkirchner, Gudrun Eger-Harsch (editors): Gute Noten mit kritischen Anmerkungen. Wirkungsanalyse der Wettbewerbe „Jugend musiziert“ 1984–1993. Dokumentation und Kommentierung. Bonn 1995.
- Herbert Saß, Andreas Eckhardt (editors): 40 Jahre Deutscher Musikrat. Auftrag und Verwirklichung. ConBrio, Regensburg 1993. ISBN 3-930079-09-7.
- Hans Timm (editor): So wächst Musik. 25 Jahre Bundesjugendorchester. ConBrio, Regensburg 1993, ISBN 3-930079-42-9.
- Eckart Rohlfs (editor): Invention und Durchführung. 25 Jahre Wettbewerbe „Jugend musiziert“ – Spektrum eines jugendkulturellen und musikpädagogischen Förderungsprogramms. Materialien und Dokumente 1963-1988. Munich 1991, ISBN 3-928544-00-4.
- Herbert Saß (editor): 40 Jahre Arbeitsgemeinschaft Musikerziehung und Musikpflege (AGMM) 1950-1990. Bonn 1990.

=== Further reading ===
- Volker Hempfling, Günter Graulich (editors): Lore-Ley. Chorbuch Deutsche Volkslieder für gemischten Chor a cappella. Carus, Stuttgart 2006. ISMN M-007-09049-4.
- Richard Jakoby (editor): Musikstudium in Deutschland. Musik, Musikerziehung, Musikwissenschaft. Schott, Mainz, 15th edition, 2006. ISBN 978-3-7957-0564-0.
- Richard Jakoby. Leben und Werk. Institut für Musikpädagogische Forschung der Hochschule für Musik und Theater Hannover, Hannover 2006. ISBN 978-3-931852-75-7.
- Richard Jakoby (editor): Musikszene Deutschland: Konzertwesen, Kulturpolitik, Wirtschaft, Berufe. In Zusammenarbeit mit Inter Nationes. Bärenreiter, Kassel 1997. ISBN 3-7618-1393-7.
- Eckart Rohlfs (editor): Musikerziehung in Deutschland. Ein Überblick. Regensburg 1994 (Sonderdruck aus: Bildung und Wissenschaft, hg. von Inter Nationes, 3/1994). ISBN 3-930079-64-X.
- Hans Günther Bastian, Rudolf-Dieter Kraemer (editors): Musikpädagogische Forschung in Deutschland. Dokumentation und Analyse. Schott, Mainz 1992. ISBN 3-7957-0261-5.
