= David Schwarz (aviation inventor) =

Hungarian aviation pioneer (1850–1897)

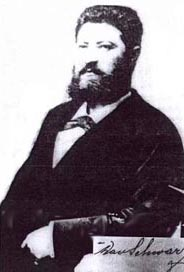
- Born: 20 December 1850; Keszthely, Kingdom of Hungary, Austrian Empire
- Died: 13 January 1897 (aged 46); Vienna, Austria-Hungary
- Occupations: Inventor, business man
- Spouse: Melanie
- Children: Vera Schwarz

David Schwarz (Note: Hungarian: Schwarz Dávid; Croatian: David Švarc, pronounced [dǎʋit ʃʋârt͡s]; David in isolation: Serbo-Croatian pronunciation: [dǎʋid].) (20 December 1850 – 13 January 1897) was an aviation pioneer of Hungarian Jewish origin who lived and worked in Croatia. He is known for creating an airship with a rigid envelope made entirely of metal. Schwarz died only months before the airship was flown. Some sources have claimed that Count Ferdinand Graf von Zeppelin purchased Schwarz's airship patent from his widow, a claim which has been disputed. He was the father of the opera and operetta soprano Vera Schwarz (1888–1964).

== Personal life ==
Schwarz was born in Keszthely, at the time Kingdom of Hungary, Austrian Empire. There is some doubt in sources regarding his exact date of birth in 1850. (Note: Sources for his date of birth vary. The OCLC cites Rotem, Ẓ. giving it as 7 December 1850, while Brockhaus gives it as 20 December 1850 The OCLC, as well as Brockhaus, show Schwarz's place of birth as Zalaegerszeg, Hungary.) He was Jewish, descended from an old Hungarian Jewish family. In 1865, his mother brought him to Županja, to live with his brother, who was an established trader there. He completed a trade school and became a merchant, running a sawmill in Našice and running a timber business between Koprivnica and Ludbreg, at the time in the Kingdom of Croatia-Slavonia. Since the 1880s, he lived in Zagreb, Kingdom of Croatia-Slavonia.

Although Schwarz had no special technical training, he became interested in technology and developed improvements for woodcutting machinery.

== First airship thoughts ==
Schwarz first became interested in airships during the 1880s. This occurred while working away from home supervising the felling of some forest land. As the work took longer than planned, he had his wife send him books to while away the evenings. These included a mechanics textbook. Although Schwarz became excited, it is not certain that this inspired him to build his own airship. His lumber business suffered due to his obsession and, like other aviation pioneers, his project attracted mockery. Nevertheless, his wife Melanie supported him. Schwarz proposed aluminium, then a very new material, for construction.

Having worked out the design of an all-metal airship, Schwarz then offered his ideas to the Austro-Hungarian war minister. Some interest was shown, but the government was not ready to provide financial support.

The Russian military attaché, a technically educated man, advised Schwarz to demonstrate his airship in St. Petersburg, where an airship using Schwarz's ideas was built in 1893. Schwarz, and later his widow, assumed that test flights would also be made there, but this did not happen. He began construction in late 1892, with the industrialist Carl Berg supplying the aluminium and necessary funding.

Problems arose during gas-filling: on inflation, the framework collapsed. Schwarz apparently intended the metal skin to contain the gas directly without internal gas bags. The Russian engineer Kowanko pointed out that the lack of a ballonet would cause stresses on the skin during ascent and descent. Also, the skin was not airtight.

The first airship's specifications were:

- Power: four cylinder engine weighing 298 kg (657 lb) producing 10 horsepower (7.5 kW) at 480 rpm
- Volume: 3,280 m^{3} (116,000 ft^{3})
- Empty weight: 2,525 kg (5,567 lb)
- Gross lift: 958 kg (2,112 lb)
- Ballast and fuel: 170 kg (370 lb)
- Equipment and three people: 385 kg (849 lb)
- Net lift: 85 kg (187 lb)

The circumstances of Schwarz's return are unclear; there were reports of a hasty departure from Russia.

== Second airship in Berlin ==
In 1894, Carl Berg procured a contract to build an airship for the Royal Prussian government, referring to Schwarz as the originator of the idea. Berg already had experience working with the then novel aluminium, and was to later manufacture components for Zeppelin's first airship. With financial and technical help from Berg and his firm, the airship was designed and built.

Construction began in 1895 at the Tempelhof field in Berlin. For a time the Prussian Airship Battalion placed its grounds and personnel at Schwarz's disposal. The components were produced in Carl Berg's Eveking Westphalia factory and, under the direction of Schwarz, assembled in Berlin. A gondola, also of aluminium, was fixed to the framework. Attached to the gondola was a 12 hp (8.9 kW) Daimler engine that drove aluminium propellers. One of the propellers was used to steer the craft.

In June 1896 Carl Berg sent a card to his stepfather from Moscow apparently indicating that he had searched for information on Schwarz and became cynical of delays and was nearly convinced he had been swindled.

Due to delays, the airship was first filled with gas and tested on 9 October 1896, but the results were not satisfactory because the hydrogen delivered by the Vereinigte Chemische Fabriken from Leopoldshall (part of Staßfurt) was not of the required purity and so did not provide enough lift. However, some sources claim that a test was performed on the 8th October 1896. It was determined that gas with a density of 1.15 kg per cubic metre was needed. Gas of that quality could not be obtained for some time, and a test flight could not be made until November 1897, roughly ten months after Schwarz's death.

== Death and maiden flight ==
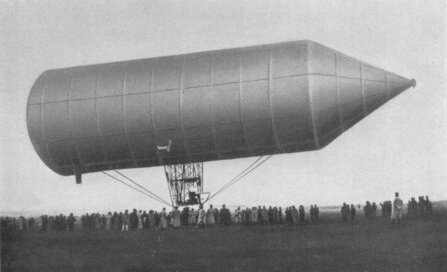
David Schwarz' airship

Schwarz did not live to see his airship fly. Between 1892 and 1896 he traveled frequently, which affected his health. Shortly before his death he received news that his airship was ready to be filled with gas. On 13 January 1897 he collapsed outside the "Zur Linde" restaurant in Vienna, and died minutes later from heart failure, aged 44. Historical sources speak of a blutsturz (a term meaning either hemoptysis or hematemesis).

David Schwarz was buried in Zentralfriedhof, Vienna.

Carl Berg required confirmation of Schwarz's death, suspecting he had fled to sell his secrets. Nevertheless, Berg resumed the work with Melanie, Schwarz's widow, and together with the Airship Battalion they completed the airship with the addition of a gas relief valve.

This second airship had these specifications:

- Volume: 3,250 m^{3} (114,700 ft^{3})
- Length: 47.55 m (156.0 ft)
- Diameter: 13.49 metres (44 feet 3 inches)
- Engine: 16 horsepower (12 kW) Daimler
- Four propellers: one of 2.6 metres (8 feet 6 inches) diameter between the gongal and the envelope, two of 2 metres (6 feet 7 inches) diameter mounted on brackets either side of the envelope, and a fourth of 2 metres (6 feet 7 inches) diameter revolving in the horizontal plane mounted below the gondola to drive the craft up or down.
- Envelope: 0.2 mm aluminium plates riveted to framework.

A later structural analysis based on the drawings concluded that it was defective, with the skin taking most of the shear stresses: distortions of the skin can be seen in a photo of the craft in flight.

The second airship was tested with partial success at Tempelhof near Berlin, Germany, on 3 November 1897. Airship Battalion mechanic Ernst Jägels climbed into the gondola and lifted off at 3 p.m. However, the airship broke free of the ground crew and, because it rose quickly, Jägels disengaged the vertical axis 'lift' propeller. At an altitude of about 130 m (430 ft) the drive belt slipped off the left propeller, resulting in the ship "...[turning] broadside to the wind, [and with the result that] the forward tether broke free." As the ship rose to 510 m (1,670 ft) the drive belt slipped off the right propeller, the airship thus losing all propulsion. Jägels then opened the newly fitted gas release valve and landed safely, but the ship turned over and collapsed and was damaged beyond repair.

== Legacy ==
About the time of the trial flight and for decades after, various accounts, sometimes conflicting or misleading, were written of the events. Later, Berg, as well as his son, would write negatively of his experiences with Schwarz.

Some sources state that Count Ferdinand von Zeppelin purchased Schwarz's patent from his widow in 1898, while others claim that the count used the design. However, Hugo Eckener, who worked with Count Zeppelin, dismissed these claims:

"Count Zeppelin negotiated with Herr Berg's firm for the purchase of the aluminium for his own ship. The firm, however, was under contract to supply aluminium for airships exclusively to the Schwarz undertaking. It had to obtain release from this contract by an arrangement with Schwarz' heirs before it could deliver aluminium to Count Zeppelin. That is the origin of the legend."

Cvi Rotem (1903–1980) wrote the only known biography of Schwarz, titled David Schwarz: Tragödie des Erfinders. Zur Geschichte des Luftschiffes. Rotem wrote that both Berg and Schwarz wished to keep their work secret.

From 3 December 2000 to 20 April 2001 the Museen der Stadt Lüdenscheid held an exhibition which covered Berg, Schwarz and Zeppelin history from 1892 to 1932, with displays of documents, photographs and airship remnants.

== Bibliography ==
- Berg, Dr. Carl. (1926). David Schwarz - Carl Berg - Graf Zeppelin: Ein Beitrag zur Geschichte der Luftschiffahrt. Munich: Eigenverlag.
- Ch. Mentschl: "Schwarz David". In: Österreichisches Biographisches Lexikon 1815–1950 (ÖBL). Vol. 11, Austrian Academy of Sciences, Vienna 1999, ISBN 3-7001-2803-7, p. 429 f. (Direct links to "p. 429", "p. 430")
- Dooley, Sean C. (2004). "Part II: Appendices" (PDF). The Development of Material-Adapted Structural Form (PDF) (Thesis). École Polytechnique Fédérale de Lausanne. Archived from the original (PDF) on 25 June 2008.
- Robinson, Douglas H., Giants in the Sky. Henley-on Thames: Foulis, 1973 ISBN 0-85429-145-8
- Robinson, Douglas H. (March 1984). "Book Review 'Daivd [sic] Schwarz: Tragödie des Erfinders: Zur Geschichte des Luftschiffes. Von Cvi Rotem, Manuscript in limited edition, 1983". Buoyant Flight. Akron, Ohio USA: Lighter-Than-Air Society.
- Schnitzler, Norbert. 2000. WWW-Tipp der Woche 24/2000 (German summary of museum exhibition)
- Whale, George (1995). British Airships, Past – Present – Future. BiblioBazaar (published 26 October 2007). ISBN 1-4264-0074-8. (also 1996 Gutenberg version)
- Goldstein, Ivo (ed.). "SCHWARZ, David". Židovski biografski leksikon. Miroslav Krleža Lexicographical Institute.
