= LZ 2 =

1905 Zeppelin B-class airship

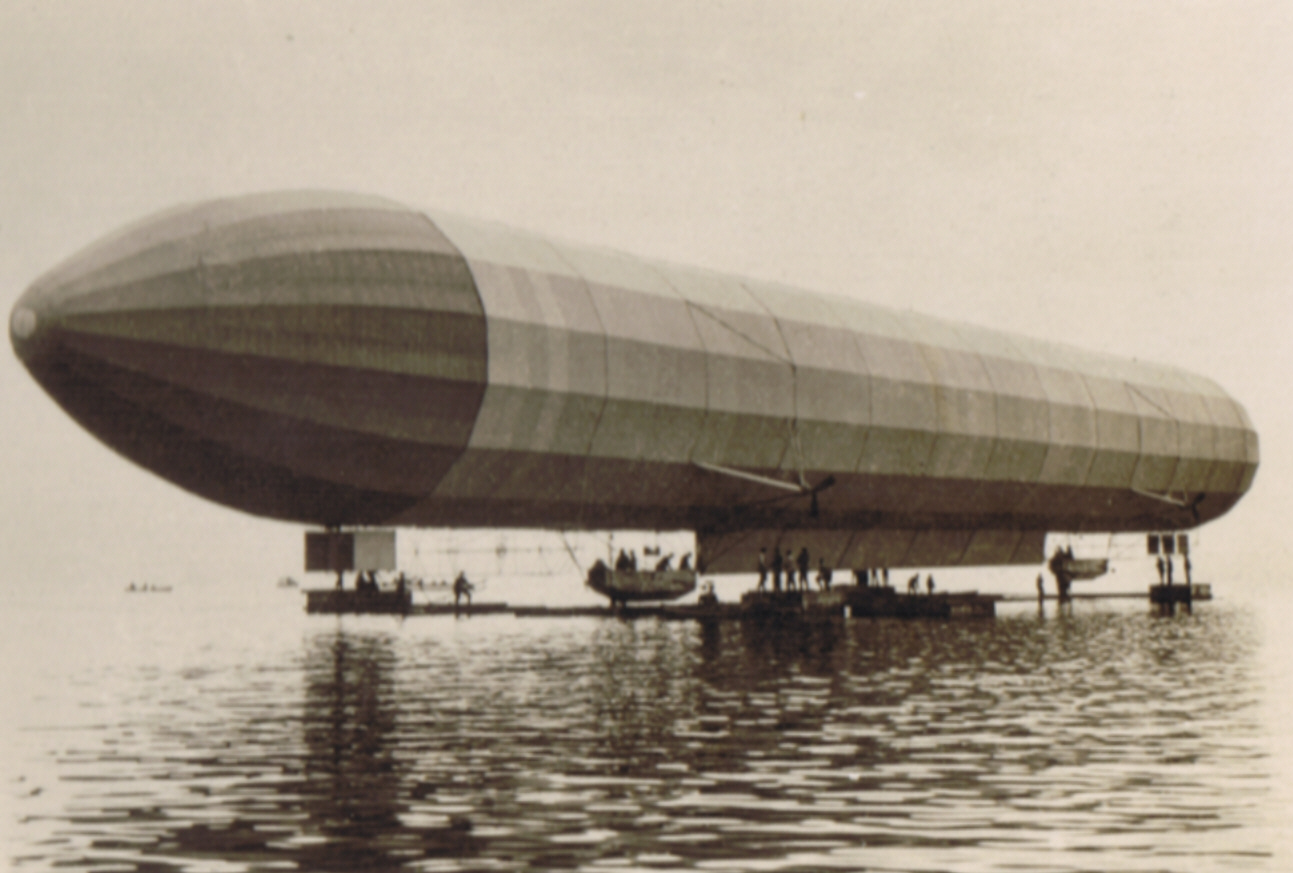

General information
- Type: Experimental airship
- National origin: Germany
- Manufacturer: Luftschiffbau Zeppelin
- Designer: Ludwig Dürr
- Number built: 1

History
- First flight: 17 January 1906

The LZ 2 was a German experimental airship constructed by Luftschiffbau Zeppelin and first flown in 1905. It was the true ancestor of later Zeppelin airship designs. The major mistakes made by Kübler in the design of the LZ 1 were not repeated: the designer, Ludwig Dürr, who was to head the design of all subsequent Zeppelins, used triangular-section girders instead of Kübler's flat girders, and elevators instead of a lead weight to control pitch. The life of the LZ 2 was brief, consisting of only one real flight.

== History ==
LZ 2 was the same size as its predecessor, LZ 1, but significantly improved. Due to delays, the new Zeppelin was not completed until November 1905, at the beginning of the winter storms. When LZ 2 was rolled out of the hangar for its first launch, a gust of wind struck the airship and pushed it against the hangar wall. Repairs took almost two months to complete.

On 17 January 1906, the LZ 2 was once again rolled out of the hangar. The engines were started, and the airship lifted off. Due to a very strong lift, the airship could only be stabilized at an altitude of 450 m, when the rudder jammed and the ship tilted at an angle of 20%. As a result, the engines could no longer be adequately supplied with fuel and stopped. Drifting uncontrollably like a balloon, LZ 2 floated towards the Allgäu region. Count Zeppelin decided to land the ship by releasing gas from the lifting cells. The anchor was dropped and caught in a frozen field. The two gondolas struck the ground several times before the anchor chain broke and LZ 2 continued drifting close to the ground. Eventually, the airship brushed against two birch trees, slightly damaging the hull, before coming to rest gently near Fischreute/Sommersried, close to Kißlegg.

Local farmers assisted the crew by hauling heavy stones to secure the ship at the bow and stern. It was the first landing of a Zeppelin on land. Originally, the intention had been to land on the smooth surface of Lake Constance, in order to avoid the risks associated with a land landing.

A severe thunderstorm during the night destroyed the airship before anything could be done. Had the ship been anchored only at the bow, it might have turned into the wind and possibly been saved.

Using saws and axes, the airship was dismantled, and the parts were transported by horse-drawn vehicles to Kißlegg, where the metal was melted down and sent back to the manufacturer. Many of its parts were used for the LZ 3.

== Legacy ==
Its near-sister ship, the LZ 3—which first flew on 9 October 1906—was purchased by the German Army and operated as the Z I until 1913. Before being purchased by the Army, LZ 3 made many flights and carried a number of prestigious passengers, including the German Crown Prince.

== Specifications ==
Data from Robinson 1973 pp.29-30

General characteristics

- Length: 126.19 m (414 ft 0 in)
- Diameter: 11.75 m (38 ft 6 in)
- Volume: 10,370 m^{3} (366,200 cu ft)
- Powerplant: 2 × Daimler piston engines , 63 kW (84 hp) each

Performance

- Maximum speed: 40 km/h (25 mph, 22 kn)
- Range: 1,100 km (680 mi, 590 nmi)
- Service ceiling: 850 m (2,800 ft)

== Bibliography ==
- Stephenson, Charles (2004). Zeppelins: German Airships 1900-40. Oxford: Osprey.
