= Arnfried Edler =

German musicologist (1938 – 2022)

- Born: 21 March 1938; Lüdenscheid, Germany
- Died: 20 April 2022 (aged 84); Hanover, Germany
- Occupation: musicologist

Arnfried Edler (21 March 1938 – 20 April 2022) was a German musicologist and university professor in Kiel and Hanover.

== Life ==
Born in Lüdenscheid, Edler studied music, German literary history and philosophy in Saarbrücken and Kiel and also took the A-Examen for Protestant Church Music at the Musikhochschule Köln in 1964. After completing his doctorate in historical musicology in 1968 and his legal clerkship for teaching at grammar schools, he worked from 1969 as a research assistant, head of the student cantor's office and university organist in Kiel with simultaneous teaching duties at the Lübeck Academy of Music.

After his habilitation in 1978, he became professor of historical musicology at the University of Kiel. From 1989 to 2003, he worked at the Hochschule für Musik, Theater und Medien Hannover.

Edler's research focuses on the music history of the 18th and 19th centuries, the social, mental and genre history of music (especially for keyboard instruments) as well as the history of aesthetics of music and music education. He has frequently worked as editor and co-author on scientific monument and complete editions (Carl Philipp Emanuel Bach, Robert Schumann) as well as on congress and project reports.

== Publications ==
- Studien zur Auffassung antiker Musikmythen im 19. Jahrhundert (Kieler Schriften zur Musikwissenschaft. Vol. 20, ZDB-ID 504075-9). Bärenreiter, Kassel among others 1970 (Zugleich: Kiel, Univ., Diss., 1968).
- Der nordelbische Organist. Studien zu Sozialstatus, Funktion und kompositorischer Produktion eines Musikerberufes von der Reformation bis zum 20. Jahrhundert (Kieler Schriften zur Musikwissenschaft. Vol. 23). Bärenreiter, Kassel among others 1982, ISBN 3-7618-0636-1 (Zugleich: Kiel, Univ., Habil.-Schr., 1978).
- Robert Schumann und seine Zeit (Große Komponisten und ihre Zeit). Laaber-Verlag, Laaber 1982, ISBN 3-921518-71-7 (3., überarbeitete und erweiterte Auflage. ibid 2008, ISBN 978-3-89007-653-9; in the Italian language as Schumann e il suo tempo. EDT, Turin 1991, ISBN 88-7063-137-0).
- Gattungen der Musik für Tasteninstrumente (Handbuch der musikalischen Gattungen. Vol. 7, parts 1–3). 3 volumes. Laaber-Verlag, Laaber 1997–2004;
  - Part 1: Von den Anfängen bis 1750, XIII/463 Seiten mit 209 Abb. und 251 Notenbeispielen, 1997, ISBN 3-89007-130-9
  - Part 2: Von 1750 bis 1830, VII/384 Seiten mit 60 Abb. und 65 Notenbeispielen, 2003, ISBN 3-89007-286-0
  - Part 3: Von 1830 bis zur Gegenwart, VIII/392 Seiten mit 78 Abb. und 64 Notenbeispielen, 2004, ISBN 3-89007-595-9
    - expanded new edition: Geschichte der Klavier- und Orgelmusik, 3 vols, Laaber 2007.
- Musik zwischen Mythologie und Sozialgeschichte. Ausgewählte Aufsätze aus den Jahren 1972 bis 2000 (Publikationen der Hochschule für Musik und Theater Hannover. Vol. 13), edited by Wolfgang Horn and Günter Katzenberger. Wißner, Augsburg 2003, ISBN 3-89639-379-0.
