= Lüdenscheider Nachrichten =

German newspaper in North Rhine-Westphalia

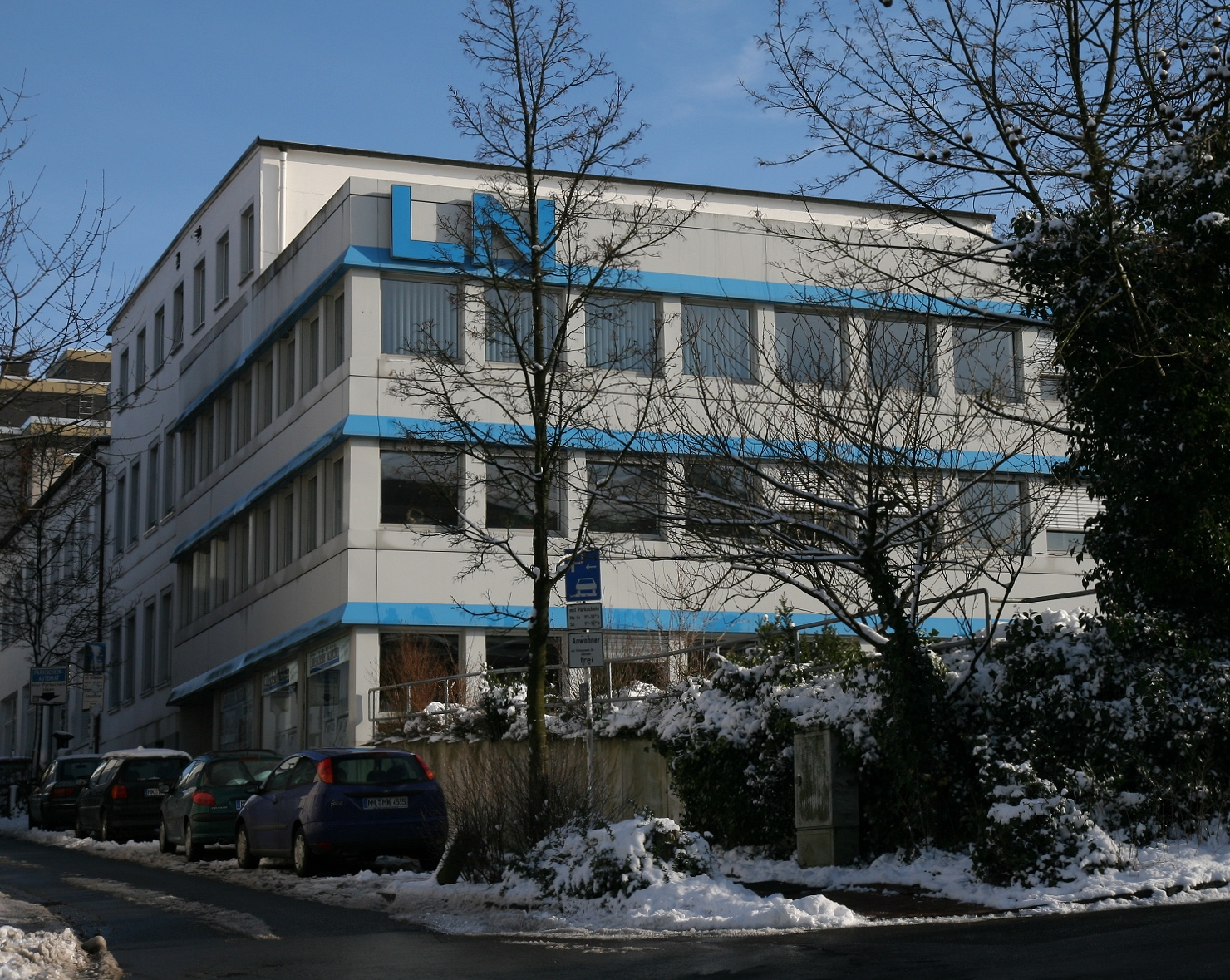
- Publishing house
- Type: Daily newspaper
- Owner: Märkischer Zeitungsverlag GmbH & Co. KG
- Publisher: Dirk Ippen
- Editor-in-chief: Martin Krigar
- Founded: 1854
- Language: German
- Headquarters: Lüdenscheid
- Sister newspapers: Meinerzhagener Zeitung; Altenaer Kreisblatt; Allgemeiner Anzeiger; Süderländer Volksfreund; Süderländer Tageblatt
- Website: https://www.come-on.de/

The Lüdenscheider Nachrichten is a local daily newspaper for Lüdenscheid and the surrounding area in the southern part of the Märkischer Kreis, North Rhine-Westphalia, Germany. It is the largest newspaper in Lüdenscheid. It is published every day except Sunday, sometimes even on public holidays. It celebrated its 150th anniversary in 2004.

The Lüdenscheider Nachrichten is published by Märkischer Zeitungsverlag, which also publishes the Meinerzhagener Zeitung, the Altenaer Kreisblatt, the Allgemeine Anzeiger (Halver) and the Süderländer Volksfreund (Werdohl). The Lüdenscheider Nachrichten cooperates editorially and technically with the Süderländer Tageblatt (Plettenberg) and the Mendener Zeitung. The total circulation of all the above, printed in Meinerzhagen, is approximately 48,000 copies.

The Lüdenscheider Nachrichten is a local newspaper that takes all its regional news from the Westfälische Anzeiger, which is published in Hamm and also supplies the regional news for a number of other newspapers.

The Lüdenscheider Nachrichten belongs to Dirk Ippen's media group, which also includes the Münchner Merkur, the tabloid newspaper tz (Munich), the Kreiszeitung in Syke, the Oranienburger Generalanzeiger, the Altmark-Zeitung, the Fehmarnsche Tageblatt, the Offenbach-Post in Offenbach am Main, and the Hessische/Niedersächsische Allgemeine in Kassel.

The chief editor of the Lüdenscheider Nachrichten is Hans Willems.

== Restructuring ==
As with many other newspapers, restructuring measures have also cost the Lüdenscheider Nachrichten jobs in recent years. In 2004, the online edition and accounting were taken over by the editorial staff of the Westfälischer Anzeiger in Hamm, resulting in the loss of jobs in Lüdenscheid.

In 2006, the Lüdenscheider Nachrichten dismissed its photo editors, the work being taken over by the editors of the respective departments or freelancers.

The companies left the Publishers' Association, and new employees are no longer paid according to collective bargaining agreements. A large part of the reporting now comes from freelancers.

== People at LN ==
- Dirk Ippen, owner
- Volker Griese, journalist

== See also ==
- List of newspapers in Germany
