= Lukas Hemleb =

German director

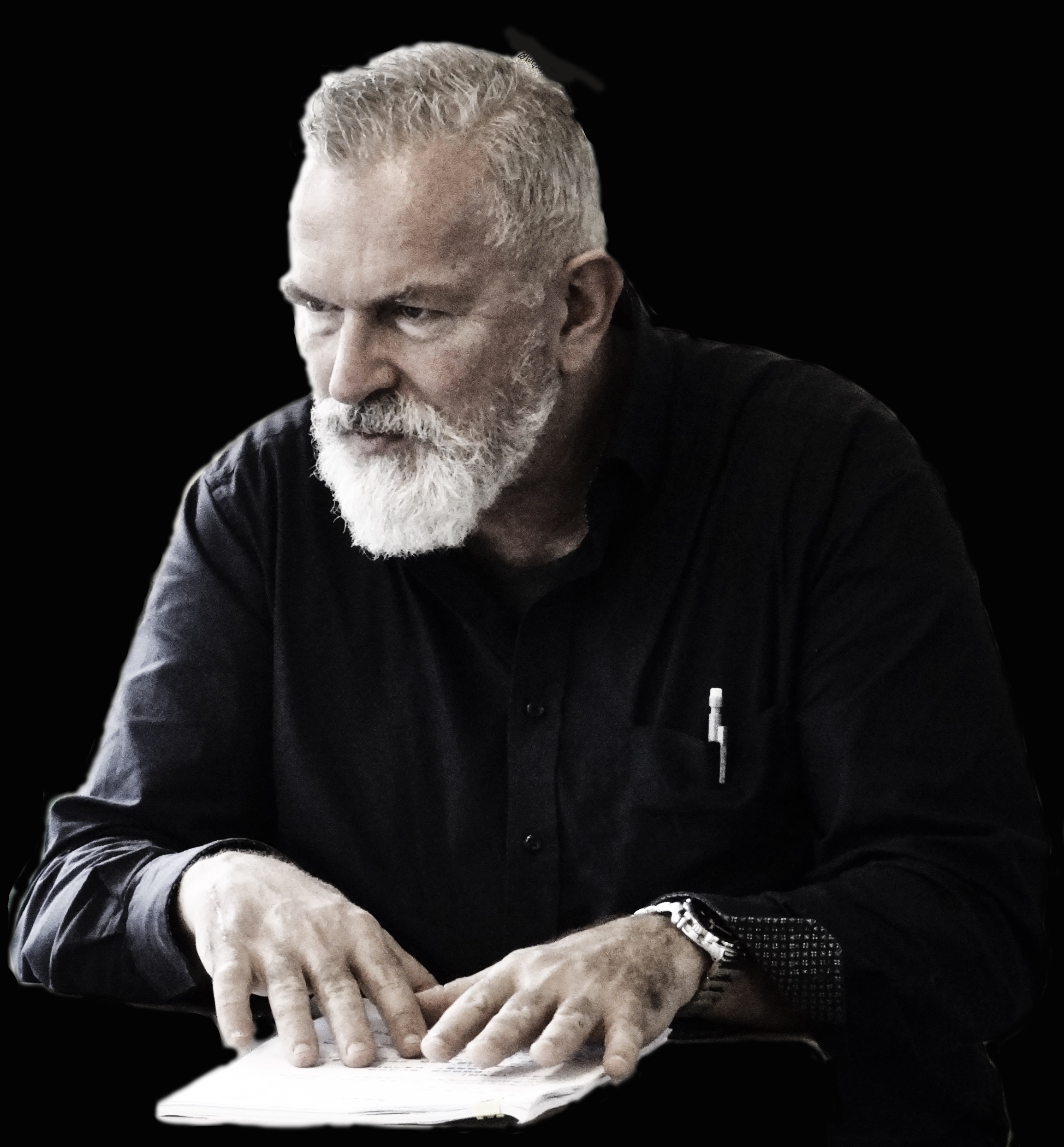
Lukas Hemleb

Lukas Hemleb (born 1960 in Bad Homburg vor der Höhe) is a German director of plays and operas, scenic designer, and librettist.

== Career ==
Born Lukas Hemmleb in Bad Homburg vor der Höhe, he was in Berlin assistant of Peter Stein, Klaus Michael Grüber and Luc Bondy, and worked in Italy with Luca Ronconi. His first own productions was in the 1990s at the Schauspielschule of the Théâtre national de Strasbourg and at the Schaubühne am Lehniner Platz. He staged at the Schauspielhaus Bochum and the Grillo-Theater in Essen, but also with performers from Cameroon and Nigeria.

His stagings were shown at the Théâtre National de l’Odéon, the Comédie-Française and other theatres in France, and also in Lausanne, Antwerp), and in Vienna at the Burgtheater and the Theater an der Wien). He directed works by Shakespeare, Molière, contemporary authors, also stage versions of literature from Dante to Marina Tsvetaeva. He worked also as a librettist for musical stage works by Reinhard Febel.

He has worked as opera director and stage set designer in Paris, Lyon, Lisbon, Aix-en-Provence, Mannheim, and at the Deutsche Oper am Rhein. He is interested in rarely played works from the 17th and 18th century. At the Schwetzingen Festival, he staged Alessandro Scarlatti's late opera Telemaco.

Interested in Chinese and Japanese culture, Hemleb has worked in Taiwan and Japan. He has lived in recent years in France and Asia.
