= Beethoven Prize =

- Awarded for: "the best orchestral work of a young composer"
- Location: Bonn
- Country: Germany
- Reward: 25,000DM
- First award: 1961
- Final award: 1992

The Beethoven Prize of the city of Bonn was an international composition competition. In 1959 Bonn's Lord Mayor Wilhelm Daniels announced the establishment of a Beethoven prize for "the best orchestral work of a young composer". No restrictions were made to genre, style and instrumentation of the composition. The prize was given every 3 years, the prize money was 25,000DM (1961: biennially, 5,000DM). The prize was last awarded in 1992. Other Beethoven Prizes existed in Vienna and Berlin.

== Recipients ==
- 1961 Heimo Erbse for Pavimento, op. 19, for large orchestra
- 1963 Milko Kelemen for Transfiguration for piano and orchestra
- 1967 György Ligeti for Requiem
- 1970 Klaus Huber for Tenebrae
- 1974 Bruno Maderna for Aura for orchestra (posthum), Peter Michael Hamel for Dharana, Chris Hinze for Live Music Now
- 1977 Iannis Xenakis for Erikhthon for orchestra, Pauline Oliveros for Bonn Fire, Pierre Mariétan for Opus Wassermusik, Luftklang, Straßenmusik
- 1980 Wolfgang Rihm for Jacob Lenz, Aleksander Lasón for Symphonie concertante for piano and orchestra, Reinhard Febel for Charivari for ensemble
- 1983 Manuel Hidalgo for Hacia (string quartet), Manfred Stahnke for Penthesilea (3rd string quartet), Joachim Krebs for Quartettomanie (2nd string quartet)
- 1986 Jörg Birkenkötter for Sechs Stücke für Kammerensemble, Michael Jarell for Trei II for soprano and five instruments, Konstantinos Varotsis for "Schillern" ("Iridescences")
- 1989 Bernd Jestl for Der König stirbt (opera), Hermann Spree for Aufregungszustand am Nachmittag (chamber opera)
- 1992 Paul Roberts for Align II for Saxophon-Trio and Piano
