= Jugend musiziert =

German music competition for children and adolescents

Logo of "Jugend musiziert"

Jugend musiziert is a music competition for children and adolescents in Germany on regional, federal, and national levels.

== Jugend musiziert in Germany ==
In Germany, the nationwide competition refers to young adults up to 20 years old and, for the singing category, up to 27 years old. It serves both the promotion of amateur music and the promotion of young people with professional musical ambitions. The participants should therefore not be in musical training (full-time) or professional practice. Many well-known musicians performed there as prize-winners for the first time to a wider audience. Moreover, success at the competition is often a benchmark for the quality of schools and music lessons. The number of participants in the regional competition from an institution is a clear indication of their commitment and the associated motivation.

The competition is divided into three stages: First stage is at regional level, second is at federal state level for those who passed the first stage. Those passing the federal state level will compete at the national level. The instrument categories change from solo participation to ensemble each year. In 1993, singing was added to the originally purely instrumental competition. Currently, the federal states of North Rhine-Westphalia, Bavaria, Saxony-Anhalt, Schleswig-Holstein and Berlin have a pilot phase for the Pop Music category with the instruments guitar pop, pop-bass, drums and pop singing. North Rhine-Westphalia has also added the category DJ.

The participants play music from different epochs. The length of the presentation depends on age and lasts from 6 to 20 minutes.

In 2005, "Jugend musiziert" had nationwide over 20,000 participants in 148 domestic regional competitions and 30 German schools abroad. About 6,500 of them were forwarded to the federal state competitions, and nearly 2,000 first prize-winners attended the national competition. The regional competitions usually take place in the first months of the year.

The competition was founded in 1963 under the sponsorship of Deutscher Musikrat (German Music Council) and the patronage of the President of Germany.

== Prizes ==
	First prize	Second prize	Third prize	Forwarding
Regional competition	25–21 Points	20–16 Points	from 15 Points	from 23 Points in age group II to State level
State competition	25–23 Points	22–20 Points	from 19 Points	from 23 Points in age group III to Federal level
Federal competition	25–24 Points	23–22 Points	from 21 Points	

== Literature ==
- Invention und Durchführung. 25 Jahre Wettbewerbe "Jugend musiziert" – Spektrum eines jugendkulturellen und musikpädagogischen Förderungsprogrammes. Materialien und Dokumente 1963–1988. Hrsg. im Auftrag des Deutschen Musikrats von Eckart Rohlfs. Deutscher Musikrat, München 1991 ISBN 3-928544-00-4
- Peter Linzenkirchner, Gudrun Eger-Harsch: Gute Noten mit kritischen Anmerkungen. Wirkungsanalyse der Wettbewerbe "Jugend musiziert" 1984–1993. Dokumentation und Kommentierung. Hrsg. für den Deutschen Musikrat von Eckart Rohlfs. Deutscher Musikrat, Bonn/München 1995 ISBN 3-928544-20-9
- Bundesgeschäftsstelle "Jugend musiziert" (Hrsg.): 33 Jahre Wettbewerbe "Jugend musiziert". Bestandsaufnahme und weitere Planung. Deutscher Musikrat, München 1996 ISBN 3-928544-25-X
