= Deutscher Musikpreis =

German music prize

Deutscher Musikpreis is a German music prize, awarded since 1979 by the German Music Publishers Association. The prize is currently 12,500 euros.

== Winners ==
- 1982 RIAS Jugendorchester
- 1985 Peter Maffay
- 1989 Richard Jakoby
- 1993 Die Prinzen
- 1997 Bundesjazzorchester
- 2000 Rolf Zuckowski
- 2004 Udo Jürgens
- 2008 Bundesjugendorchester
- 2012 Dieter Thomas Heck
