= Vera Schwarz =

Austrian opera singer (1888–1964)

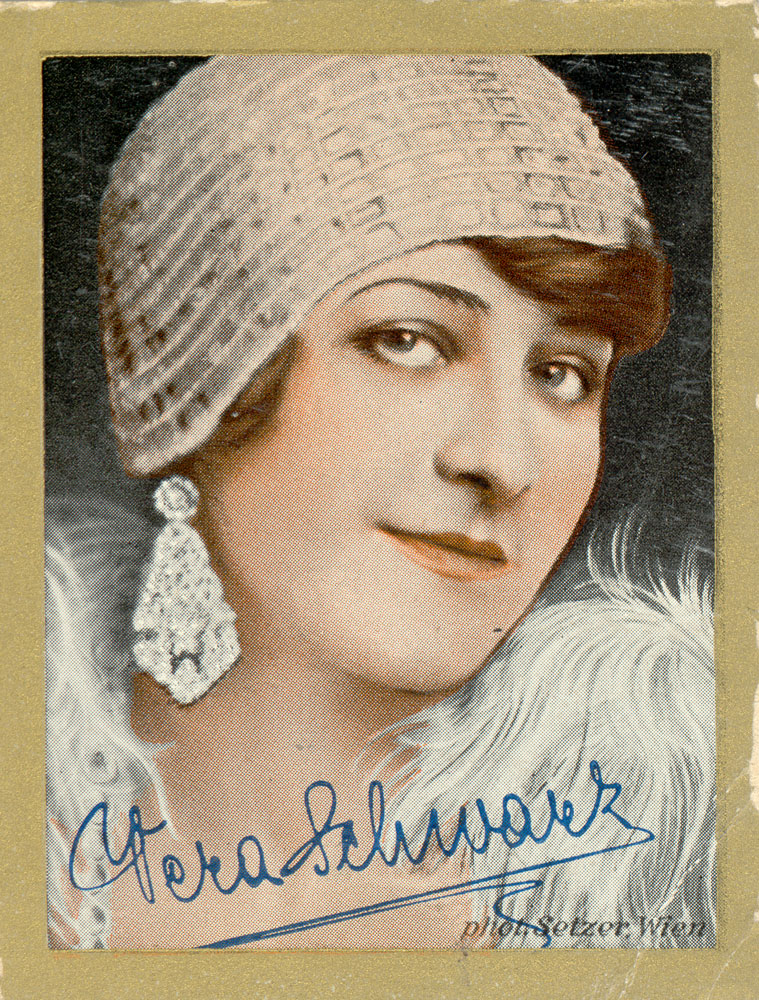
- Vera Schwarz Portrait
- Born: 10 July 1888; Zagreb
- Died: 4 December 1964 (aged 76); Vienna
- Burial place: Feuerhalle Simmering (cremated ashes)
- Occupation: soprano
- Known for: operetta partnership with Richard Tauber
- Father: David Schwarz

Vera Schwarz (10 July 1888 – 4 December 1964) was an Austrian soprano, known primarily for her operetta partnership with Richard Tauber.

== Life ==
Vera Schwarz was born in Zagreb, the daughter of Hungarian-Croatian aviation pioneer David Schwarz. She studied in Vienna with Philipp Forstén and gave her debut in 1908 at the Theater an der Wien. From 1908 to 1912 she was a member of the Grazer Oper, and from 1911 to 1913 she sang at the Johann Strauss Theater in Vienna. After performing in Karlsbad she came to the Hamburger Stadttheater in 1914. From 1918 to 1922 she was an ensemble member of the Staatsoper Unter den Linden in Berlin.

=== Vienna ===
From 1921 to 1930 Schwarz appeared often as a guest in Vienna, performing the title roles of Tosca and Carmen, Eva in Die Meistersinger von Nürnberg, Sieglinde in Die Walküre, Countess in The Marriage of Figaro and Rachel in La Juive, receiving the title "Kammersängerin"". It was during this time that she taught her Vienna Staatsoper colleague Leo Slezak's daughter (and Walter Slezak's brother), Margarete. In her book Der Apfel fällt nicht weit vom Stamm Margarete Slezak recounts their meeting: "I paid Vera Schwarz a visit, and asked her to test my voice. Frau Schwarz found it would be worthwhile to train my voice, and promised me, while keeping this strictly secret from my family, to give me lessons. She lived with her mother, a delicate yet unbelievably energetic lady. Mama Schwarz missed no performance of her daughter. She sat in the middle of the parquet and influenced the audience's applause particularly loudly. While doing so she would turn left and right claiming loudly: "Charming, magnificent! Who is this God-gifted singer?". One time an acquaintance sat behind, unseen by her. He bent forward and said for everyone to overhear: "But, gnädige Frau, surely you would know that!"

=== Partnership with Richard Tauber ===
From 1929 to 1933 Schwarz was a member of the Metropol-Theater Berlin ensemble, returning in 1931 to 1933 to the Staatsoper Unter den Linden. She became well known as Richard Tauber's operetta partner, and sang often in this genre, almost always with Tauber. She appeared with Tauber in the Berlin Premiere of Lehar's operetta Paganini in January 1926 at the Deutsches Künstlertheater, and in a new production at the Theater des Westens in April 1930, both conducted by the composer. She and Tauber appeared, again under the composer's baton, in the October 1929 premiere of Das Land des Lächelns at the Metropol Theater in Berlin.

Schwarz and Tauber had first appeared together in Carmen at the Berliner Staatsoper in May 1921, and were often to appear together in operas such as Die Tote Stadt, Un Ballo in Maschera, Tosca, and Die Fledermaus at the Wiener Staatsoper. It was here they last appeared together in Das Land des Lächelns in February 1938.

=== International activity ===
She appeared in the opera houses of Amsterdam, Budapest, London, Munich, and Paris, where she performed Tosca in 1928 at the Opéra-Comique Paris. In 1929 she sang Octavian in Rosenkavalier at the Salzburger Festspiele. One of her last roles was as Verdi's Lady Macbeth at the 1939 Glyndebourne Festival.

=== Persecution and emigration ===
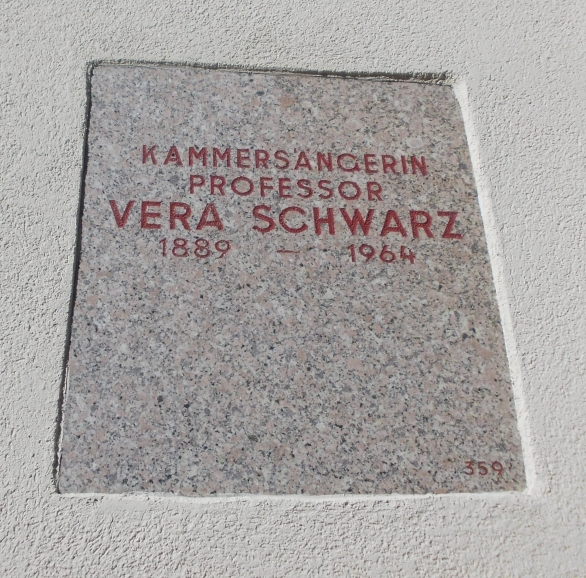
Feuerhalle Simmering, grave of Vera Schwarz

Having Jewish paternal grandparents, Schwarz was forced to leave Germany in 1933, singing in Vienna, giving a world premiere of a work by Salmhofer in 1935, and appearing as late as 1938 with Tauber in Lehar's Das Land des Lächelns. A few months after this performance, she emigrated first to England (where she sang Lady Macbeth in Glyndebourne), then to the United States, where she appeared in Chicago and in San Francisco, but concentrated mostly on concert appearances (including concerts at the Los Angeles German-Jewish club)), and teaching in New York, and in Hollywood. Here she coached Risë Stevens and Marni Nixon.

=== Later life ===
Schwarz returned to Vienna in 1948, teaching voice and giving masterclasses at Mozarteum University Salzburg. She died in Vienna in 1964 and was cremated at Feuerhalle Simmering, where also her ashes are buried (Abt. MH, Nr. 359).

In 2011, a street in Vienna's 23rd district was named Vera-Schwarz-Gasse in her honour.
