= Manuel Hidalgo (composer) =

Spanish composer (born 1956)

Manuel Antonio Hidalgo Téllez (Note: In this Spanish name, the first or paternal surname is Hidalgo and the second or maternal family name is Téllez.) (born 4 February 1956) is a Spanish composer of classical music.

Born in Antequera, Andalusia, in 1956, Manuel Hidalgo studied music in Granada, Zurich and Berlin and, under Helmut Lachenmann, in Hanover and Stuttgart. His opera Bacon 1561–1992 premiered at the Schwetzingen Festival in 2001.

== Awards ==
- 1983: The Beethoven Prize, awarded by the city of Bonn to young composers, for his string quartet Hacia.
