= Zeppelin LZ 1 =

1900 Zeppelin A Class airship

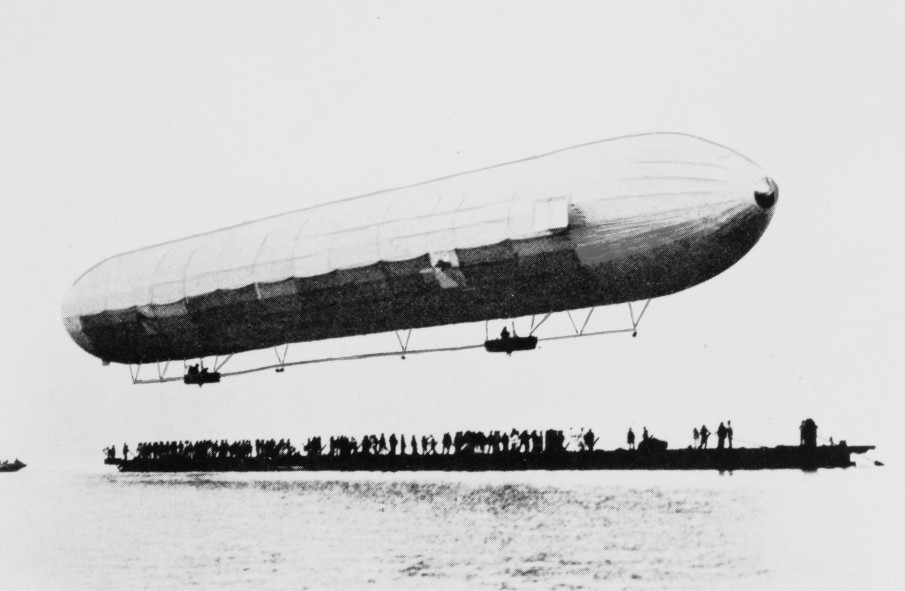
- First Zeppelin flight, above a boat at Lake Constance

General information
- Type: Experimental airship
- National origin: Germany
- Manufacturer: Gesellschaft zur Förderung der Luftschifffahrt
- Designer: Theodor Kober
- Number built: 1

History
- First flight: 2 July 1900

The Zeppelin LZ 1 was the first successful experimental rigid airship. It was first flown from a floating hangar on Lake Constance, near Friedrichshafen in southern Germany, on 2 July 1900. "LZ" stood for Luftschiff Zeppelin, or "Airship Zeppelin".

== Design and development ==
Count Zeppelin had been devoting his energies to the design of large rigid-framed airships since his retirement from the army in 1890. In 1898 he established the Gesellschaft zur Förderung der Luftschifffahrt. The company had a subscribed capital of 800,000 Deutschmarks, of which Zeppelin contributed 300,000 Deutschmarks: the remainder was provided by various industrialists, including 100,000 Deutschmarks contributed by Carl Berg, whose company provided the aluminium framework of the airship. The company first constructed a large floating shed to contain the airship. This arrangement was decided on firstly because Zeppelin believed that landing the ship over water would be safer and secondly because the floating shed, moored only at one end, would turn so that it was always facing into the wind.

The LZ 1 was constructed using a cylindrical framework with 16 wire-braced polygonal transverse frames and 24 longitudinal members covered with smooth surfaced cotton cloth. Inside was a row of 17 gas cells made from rubberized cotton. The airship was steered by forward and aft rudders and propulsion was provided by two 10.6 kW (14.2 hp) Daimler NL-1 internal-combustion engines, each driving two propellers mounted on the envelope. Pitch control was by use of a 100 kg (220 lb) weight suspended beneath the hull which could be winched forward or aft to control its attitude. Passengers and crew were carried in two 6.2 m (20 ft) long aluminium gondolas suspended forward and aft.

Construction of the airship began on 17 June 1898, when the first sections of the framework were delivered from Berg's factory and was completed by 27 January 1900. Inflation of the gasbags took place during June and the airship was first taken out of the shed on the evening of 2 July, with Hauptmann Hans Bartsch von Sigsfeld of the Prussian Airship Battalion at the controls.

The first flight revealed serious structural deficiencies in the framework, and an attempt to remedy this was made by incorporating the walkway between the gondolas into a rigid keel structure. At the same time the moveable weight was increased to 150 kg (330 lb), the aft rudders moved from either side of the envelope to below it, and an elevator fitted below the nose.

== Operational history ==
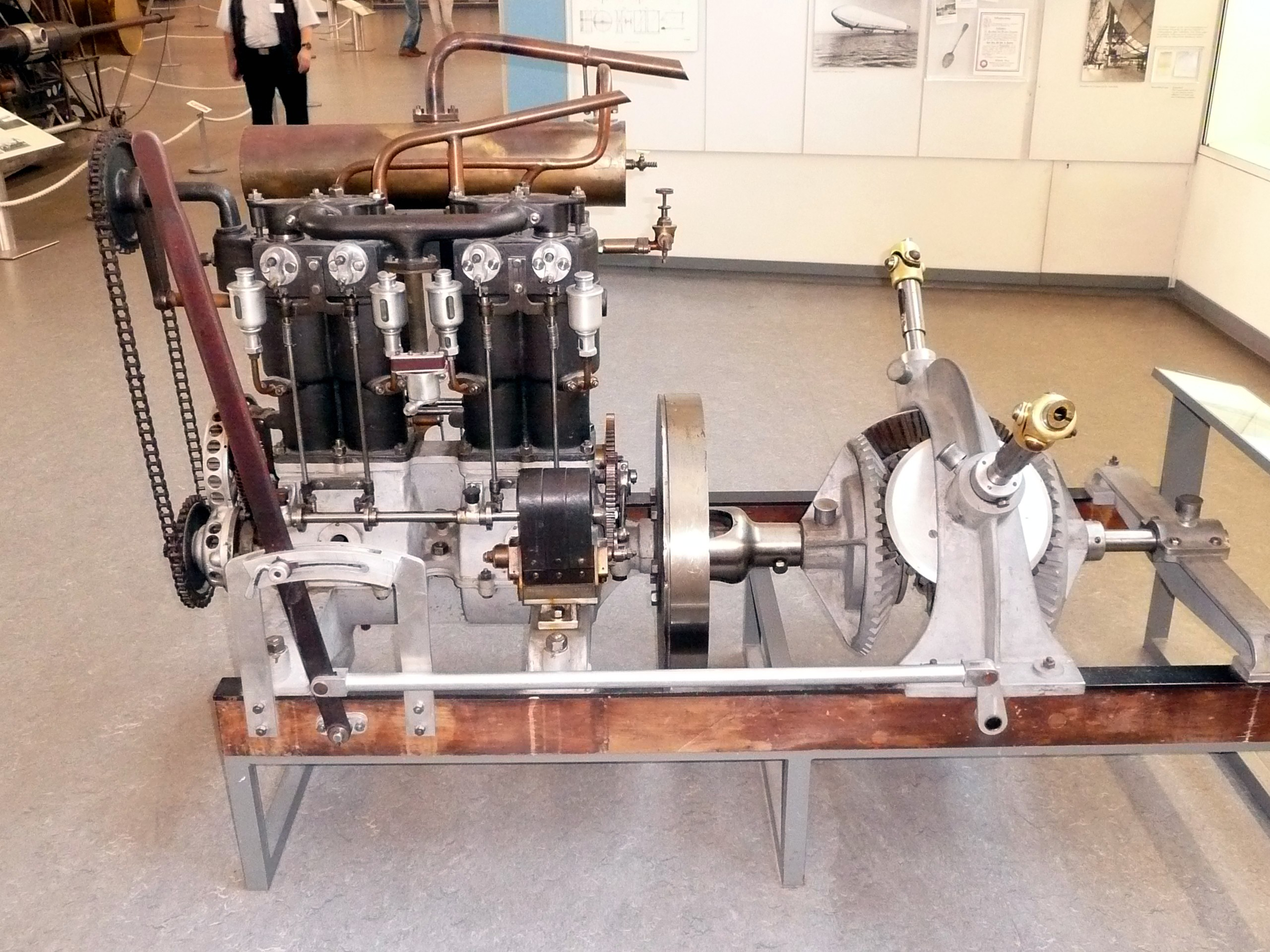
One of LZ 1's Daimler NL-1 engines, preserved in the Deutsches Museum, Munich

At its first trial the LZ 1 carried five people, reached an altitude of 410 m (1,350 ft) and flew a distance of 6.0 km (3.7 mi) in 17 minutes, but by then the moveable weight had jammed and one of the engines had failed: the wind then forced an emergency landing. After repairs and alterations, the ship flew two more times, on 17 and 24 October. It showed its potential by beating the speed record of 6 kilometres per hour (3.2 kn; 3.7 mph) then held by the French Army's electric-powered non-rigid airship La France, but this did not convince any potential investors. Because funding was exhausted, Graf von Zeppelin had to dismantle the airship, sell the scrap and tools and liquidate the company.

== Specifications ==
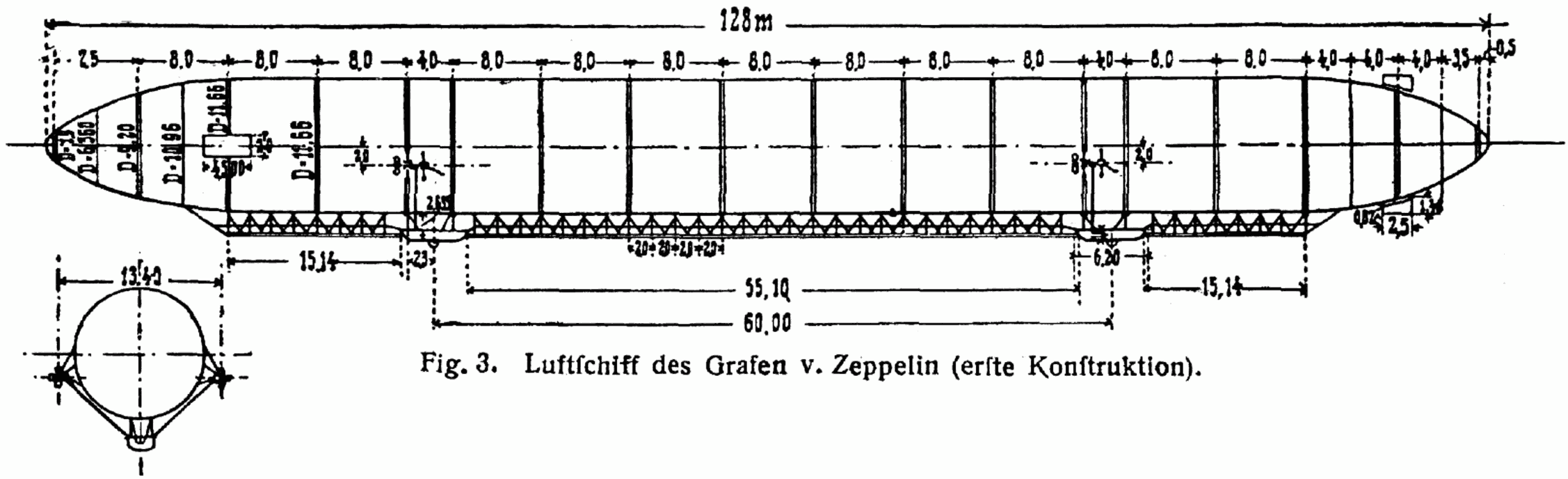
The Lexikon der gesamten Technik (second Auflage 1904–1920) included this plan of the LZ 1.

Data from Robinson 1973 pp.23-4

General characteristics

- Length: 128.02 m (420 ft 0 in)
- Diameter: 11.73 m (38 ft 6 in)
- Volume: 11,298 m^{3} (399,000 cu ft)
- Useful lift: 12,428 kg (27,400 lb)
- Powerplant: 2 × Daimler NL-1 4-cylinder water-cooled piston engines , 11 kW (14.2 hp) each

Performance

- Maximum speed: 27 km/h (17 mph, 15 kn)

== See also ==
- Timeline of hydrogen technologies
- Zeppelin
