= Lüdenscheid =

- Town
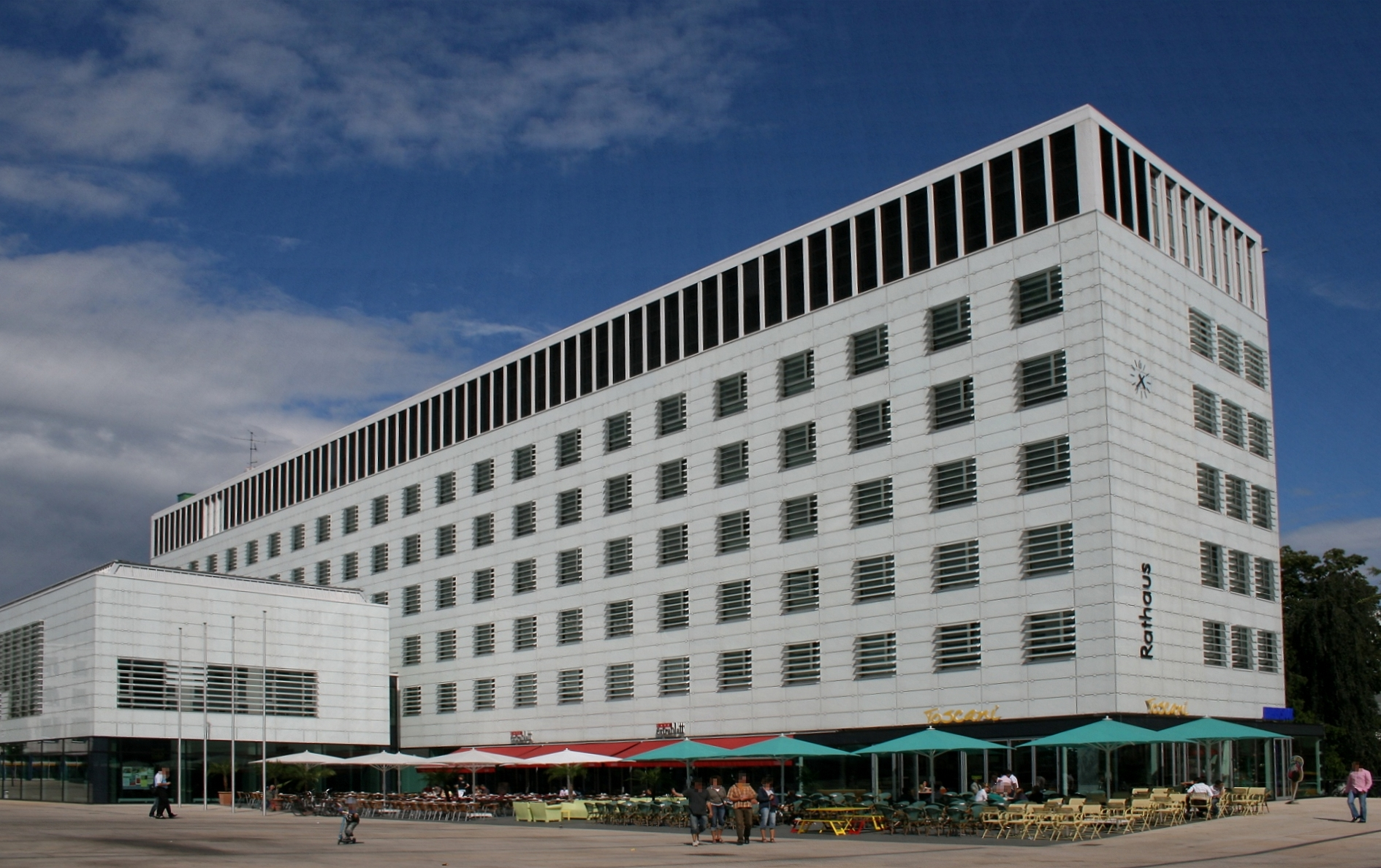
- Town hall of Lüdenscheid

- Coat of arms

- Location of Lüdenscheid within Märkischer Kreis district
- Interactive map of Lüdenscheid
- Location within Germany Location within North Rhine-Westphalia
- Coordinates: 51°13′N 07°38′E
- Country: Germany
- State: North Rhine-Westphalia
- Admin. region: Arnsberg
- District: Märkischer Kreis

Government
  - Mayor (2020–25): Sebastian Wagemeyer (SPD)

Area
  - Total: 87.02 km^{2} (33.60 sq mi)
- Elevation: 232–539 m (761–1,768 ft)

Population (2025-12-31)
  - Total: 70,810
  - Density: 813.7/km^{2} (2,108/sq mi)
- Time zone: UTC+01:00 (CET)
  - Summer (DST): UTC+02:00 (CEST)
- Postal codes: 58507–58515
- Dialling codes: 02351
- Vehicle registration: MK, LÜD, LS
- Website: www.luedenscheid.de

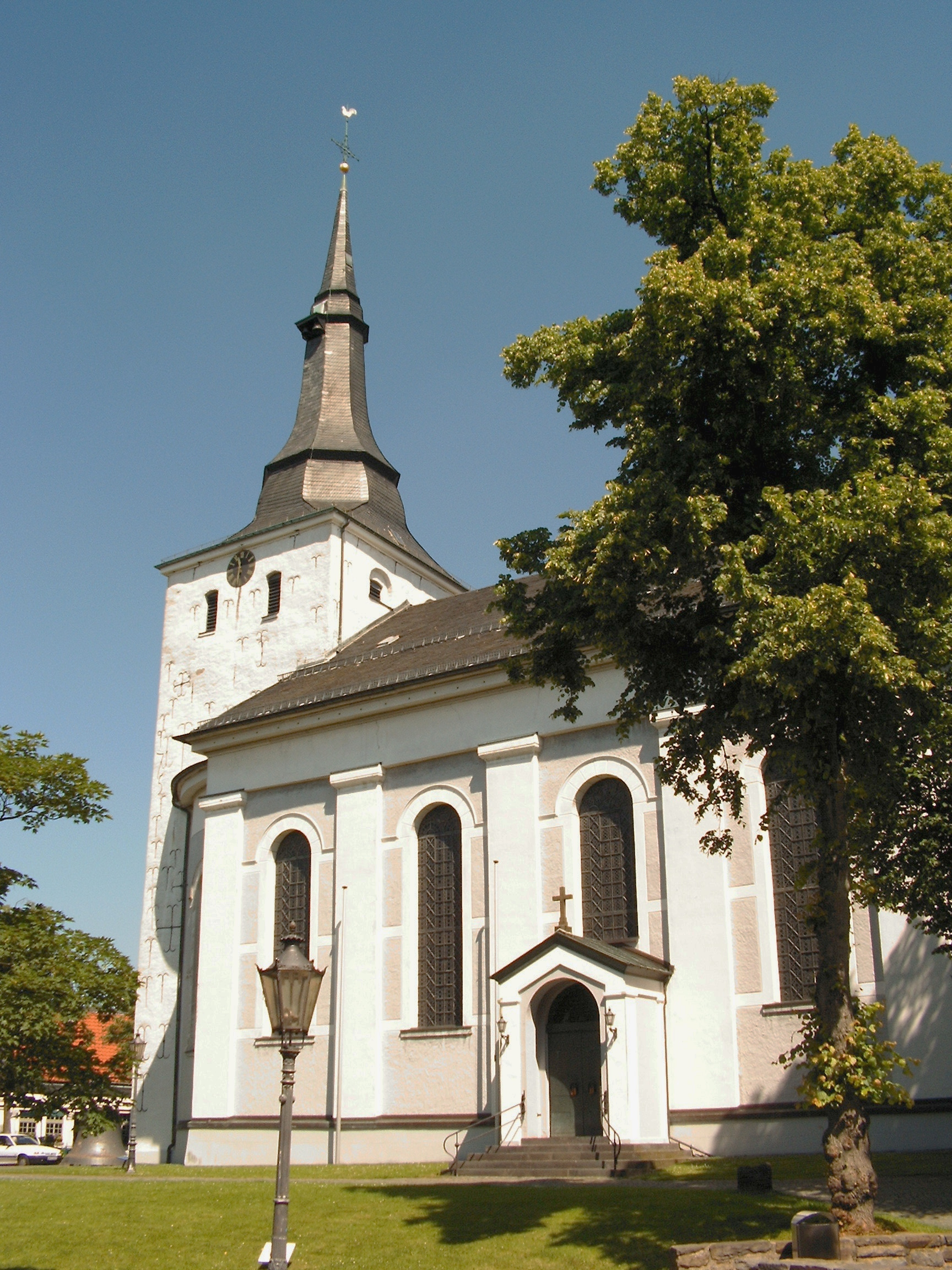
Church of the Redeemer, former St. Medardus

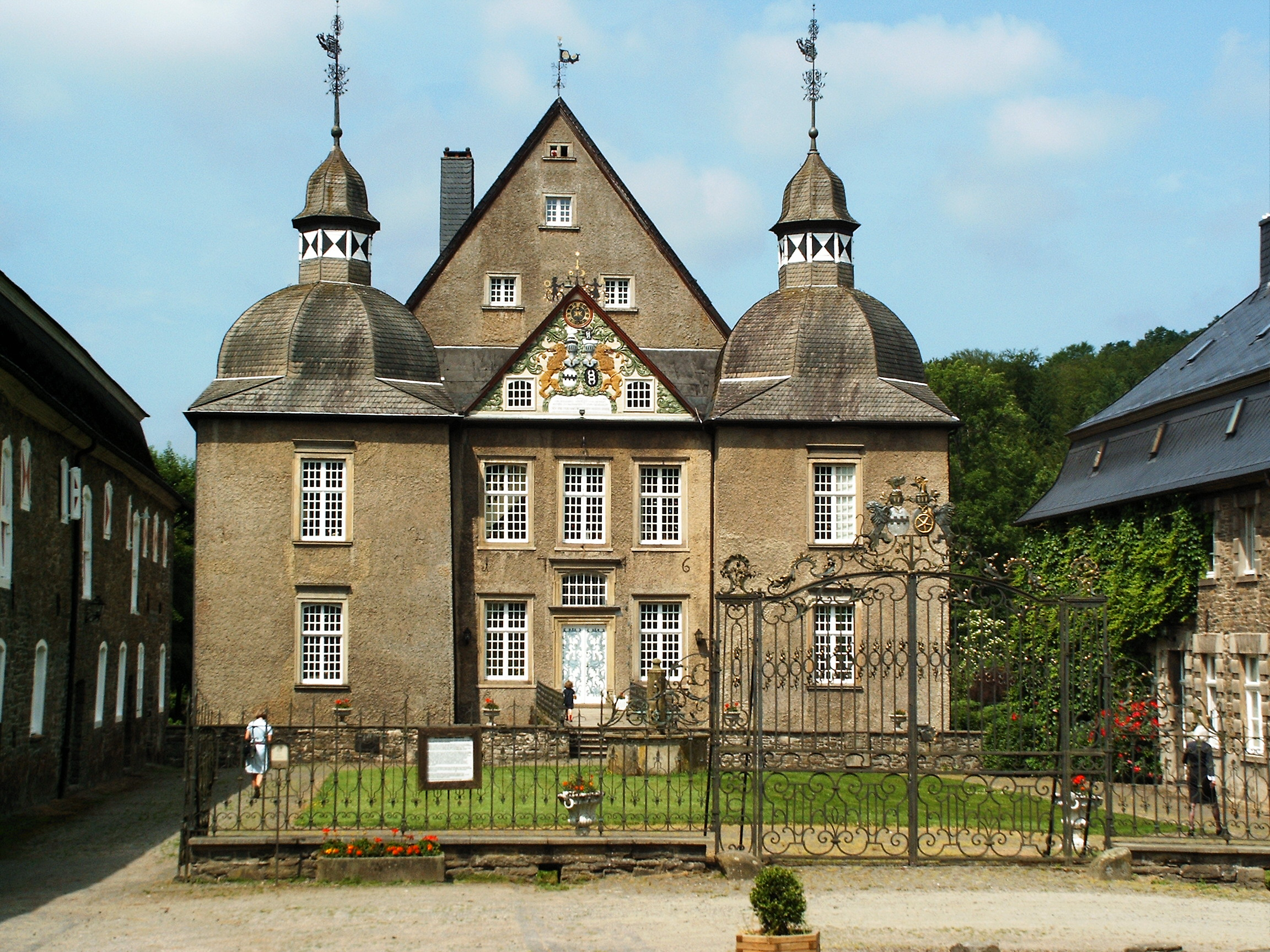
Water castle Neuenhof

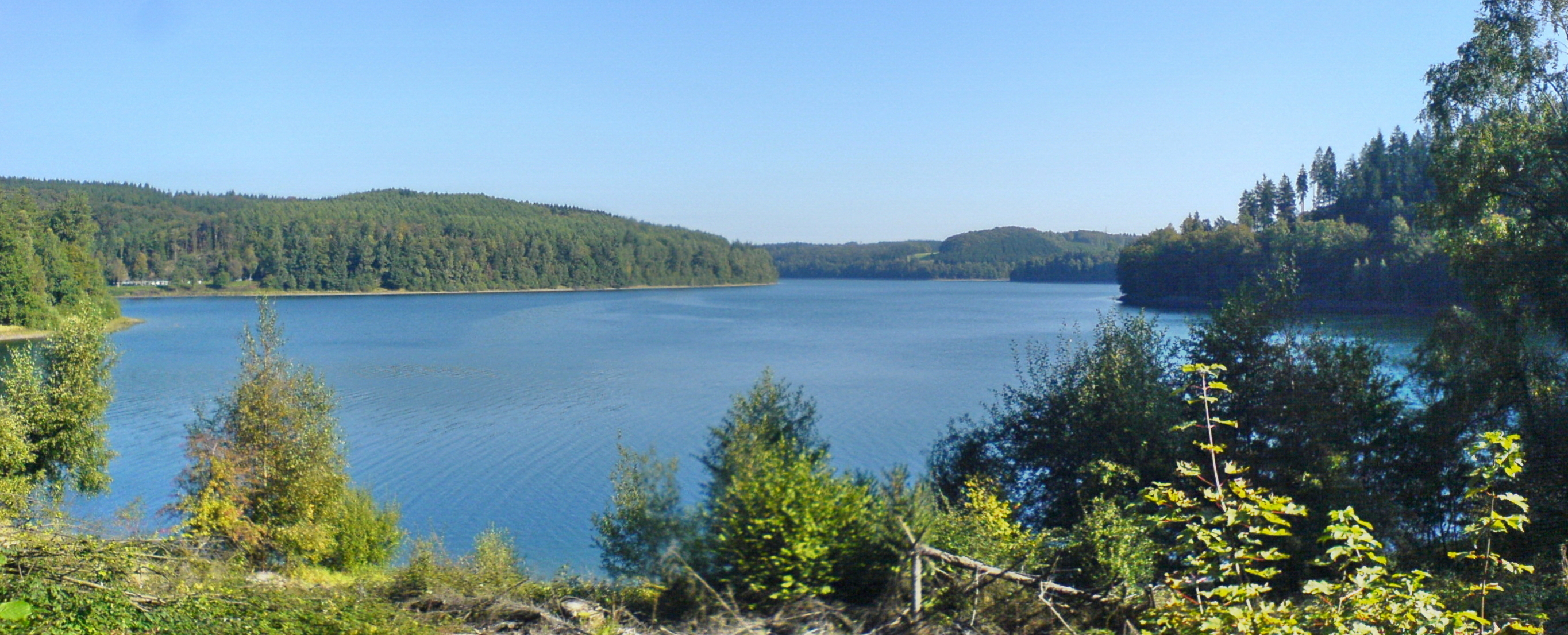
Verse River reservoir

Lüdenscheid (German pronunciation: [ˈly:dn̩ʃaɪt]) is a city in the Märkischer Kreis district, in North Rhine-Westphalia, Germany. It is located in the Sauerland region.

== Geography ==
Lüdenscheid is located on the saddle of the watershed between the Lenne and Volme rivers which both empty into the Ruhr river (which subsequently flows into the Rhine), with three smaller valleys leading to them. The saddle has a height of 420 meters, higher elevations on the watershed are an unnamed hilltop of 505 meters in the north, and the 663 meters high Nordhelle in the Ebbe Mountains range. In the surrounding mountainous area, six dams created reservoirs to regulate the water flow in the Ruhr and supply drinking water. The mountainous nature of the city's territory gave rise to the nickname "Bergstadt" (mountain town). The original settlement circles around the church built on a ledge of the slope above the saddle.

== Climate ==
Climate data for Lüdenscheid (1991–2020 normals)
Month	Jan	Feb	Mar	Apr	May	Jun	Jul	Aug	Sep	Oct	Nov	Dec	Year
Mean daily maximum °C (°F)	3.4 (38.1)	4.6 (40.3)	8.3 (46.9)	13.2 (55.8)	17.0 (62.6)	20.1 (68.2)	22.0 (71.6)	21.8 (71.2)	17.7 (63.9)	13.0 (55.4)	7.7 (45.9)	4.2 (39.6)	12.8 (55.0)
Daily mean °C (°F)	1.1 (34.0)	1.8 (35.2)	4.4 (39.9)	8.4 (47.1)	12.2 (54.0)	15.2 (59.4)	17.1 (62.8)	16.8 (62.2)	13.1 (55.6)	9.4 (48.9)	5.2 (41.4)	2.0 (35.6)	8.9 (48.0)
Mean daily minimum °C (°F)	−1.2 (29.8)	−0.9 (30.4)	0.9 (33.6)	3.8 (38.8)	7.3 (45.1)	10.3 (50.5)	12.4 (54.3)	12.1 (53.8)	9.1 (48.4)	6.1 (43.0)	2.7 (36.9)	−0.2 (31.6)	5.2 (41.4)
Average precipitation mm (inches)	119.1 (4.69)	95.4 (3.76)	91.8 (3.61)	55.8 (2.20)	78.4 (3.09)	74.7 (2.94)	95.4 (3.76)	95.0 (3.74)	89.0 (3.50)	90.2 (3.55)	93.8 (3.69)	115.0 (4.53)	1,091.2 (42.96)
Average precipitation days (≥ 1.0 mm)	20.1	18.3	18.3	13.7	16.2	15.9	16.3	16.1	15.4	17.4	19.6	20.9	207.8
Average snowy days (≥ 1.0 cm)	10.2	11.2	5.2	0.7	0	0	0	0	0	0	1.8	7.0	36.1
Average relative humidity (%)	88.0	84.2	79.2	71.6	72.9	74.2	75.5	76.0	81.5	85.0	88.5	89.1	80.5
Mean monthly sunshine hours	50.7	69.7	118.6	164.0	183.7	187.1	189.1	186.6	140.3	103.9	54.5	41.0	1,488.4
Source: World Meteorological Organization

Largest groups of foreign residents
Nationality	Population (2011)
Turkey	3,115
Greece	2,858
Italy	906

== History ==
While first settlement in the Lüdenscheid area is confirmed for the 9th century, the first mention of the place as a village was made in 1067 and as a city in 1268. In the 15th and 16th century Lüdenscheid was a member of the Hanseatic League. Since 1609 the town belonged to the Electorate of Brandenburg, the later Prussia. In 1815 it became part of the new Prussian Province of Westphalia, and 1975, with the creation of the Märkischer Kreis, became seat of its administration. In 1898 the aluminium framework of the first Zeppelin airship was built in the factory of Carl Berg in Lüdenscheid.

== Population ==
Historical population

Year	Pop.	±% p.a.
1965	77,898	—
1970	79,086	+0.30%
1975	76,226	−0.73%
1980	74,584	−0.43%
1985	73,294	−0.35%
1990	79,401	+1.61%
1995	81,837	+0.61%

Year	Pop.	±% p.a.
2000	80,613	−0.30%
2005	78,688	−0.48%
2010	75,463	−0.83%
2015	73,354	−0.57%
2020	71,911	−0.40%
2025	70,810	−0.31%

Source: Landesdatabank Nordrhein-Westfalen

== Economy ==
Lüdenscheid is a predominantly industrial city with small and medium-sized firms in the metal and plastics industry. The largest company employs 2,000 people in Lüdenscheid, with other firms employing 800 people or less.

The economic importance came to the fore in the Middle Ages, when the city became a centre for metal ore mining in the surrounding area, through the ("osemund"/osmond iron). The ore was processed by the hammers and wire drawers of Lüdenscheid, serviced by water power in the surrounding valleys. A number of artisanal smitheries in Lüdenscheid made finished products out of those materials. In order to market these products to a wider area, Lüdenscheid joined the Hanseatic League.

With the emergence of the industrial age, the production of buttons and buckles played a large role, reflected in the Button Museum. Later, new materials like aluminium, bakelite, and plastics were adopted. A supporting industry producing the forms for the stamping, blanking, pressing and casting emerged and still plays an important part in Lüdenscheid's industry.

Production of parts of the auto industry and of fittings for electrical installations play an important role as well as continuous casting of aluminium profiles. Products notable to end consumers are lamps and lighting systems and toys.

== Education ==
One of the five branches of South Westphalia University of Applied Sciences is in Lüdenscheid. See also the Fachhochschule Südwestfalen (FH SWF)), which offers various engineering programmes and is located in the city.

== Places of interest ==
- Church of the Redeemer

in the center of the circular layout of the old city. The protestant church is the oldest in the city. Its tower dates from the 11th century, while the parish nave was rebuilt during the classicistic period in the early 19th century.

- Water castle Neuenhof

in the Elspe valley behind the Nurre mountain. The present building with an early baroque style was erected in the end of the 17th century.

- Homert tower

Observation tower on top of the Homert mountain (539 m above sea level), the highest location in Lüdenscheid

- Verse River reservoir
- City Museum

including among others the Button Museum and other exhibits showing the evolution of Lüdenscheid's industry

== Coat of arms ==
The coat of arms shows Saint Medardus as the patron of the city. Below it has the red-and-white checked fess from the arms of the Counts of the Mark. The city wall at the bottom denotes the city rights that Lüdenscheid received in 1287.

== Sports ==
"Lüdenscheid-Nord" is a demeaning and satirical name, most commonly used by the fans of FC Schalke 04 to mock the football club Borussia Dortmund. The real football club Rot-Weiß Lüdenscheid is playing in the Bezirksliga, the eight level below the Bundesliga, but did play once in the second Bundesliga Nord (Northern section) for two seasons in 1977–78 and 1978–79.

The Highlander Lüdenscheid are a skaterhockey-team playing in the highest German league, the Bundesliga.

== Culture ==
The Lüdenscheider Altstadtbühne is a part of the culture in Lüdenscheid. It is based in the Luisenstraße. The chairman is Christel Gabler. A well-known actor is Peter Zimmer.

== Twin towns – sister cities ==
Lüdenscheid is twinned with:

- Den Helder, Netherlands (1980)
- Brighouse, England (1983)
- Leuven, Belgium (1987)
- Myślenice, Poland (1989)
- Romilly-sur-Seine, France (1991)
- Taganrog, Russia (1991)

== Notable people ==
- Carl Berg (1851–1906), airship builder
- Adolf Schulte (1894–1917), World War I flying ace
- Wilhelm Ackermann (1896–1962), mathematician
- Paul Wieghardt (1897–1969), American painter and professor
- Else Hueck-Dehio (1897–1976), writer
- Kurt Weill (1900–1950), composer, had his first engagement from 1919–1921 at the theatre in Lüdenscheid
- Arnfried Edler (born 1938), musicologist
- Nuri Şahin (born 1988), footballer
- Werner Naumann (1909–1982), German politician and Reichsminister of Public Enlightenment and Propaganda (30 April – 1 May 1945)
- Dörte Schiltz (born 1976), Olympic rhythmic gymnast

== Media ==
The Lüdenscheid newspaper is the Lüdenscheider Nachrichten.
