= Hannoversche Gesellschaft für Neue Musik =

German publisher

The Hannoversche Gesellschaft für Neue Musik (HGNM) also "Gesellschaft für Neue Musik" is a publisher based in Hanover specializing in Neue Musik.

== History and activities ==
The association was founded on 31 January 1987 in Hanover. The aim of the association is the promotion and communication of Neue Musik. The association is a corporate member of the Society for New Music, the Gesellschaft für Neue Musik, the Internationale Gesellschaft für Neue Musik, the Internationale Gesellschaft für Neue Musik (IGNM) and the Niedersächsischen Gesellschaft für Neue Musik.

The Hannoversche Gesellschaft für Neue Musik organises concerts and premieres of neue musik, organises international composition competitions and commissions compositions. It has organised music festivals, including the Biennale Neue Musik Hannover, ein Glockenkonzert zum 30. Evangelischen Kirchentag 2005 and the festival für neue musik.

The association produced numerous introductions to works and documentaries. Since 1987, it has published the journal Noten und Notizen: Zeitschrift der Hannoverschen Gesellschaft für Neue Musik e.V..

== Publication ==
- Hinrich Bergmeier, Anke Sonnek: Elliott Carter. Eine Hommage, Springe: HGNM, 1991
