= Richard Jakoby =

German music pedagogue

Richard Matthias Jakoby (11 September 1929 – 9 July 2017) was a German music teacher and cultural manager and until 1993 director of the Hochschule für Musik und Theater Hannover.

== Life ==
Born in Dreis, Jakoby was the sixth of seven children (he had a twin sister with whom he received piano lessons). He attended school in Klüsserath (where his father was a teacher) and from 1937 in Trier (Friedrich-Wilhelms-Gymnasium from 1940). During the Second World War he was a student in the medical service and for a short time he was called up for the Volkssturm to dig tank trenches. The family moved back to Dreis after the destruction of Trier by bombing in 1944. At times he worked and lived in the winery of his piano teacher. From 1946 he attended the Cusanus-Gymnasium in Wittlich with the Abitur in 1949, after which he studied Romance languages and literature, musicology and music education and philosophy in Mainz. He financed his studies by teaching and as a working student before he received a Gutenberg scholarship. In 1954 he passed the state examination and received his doctorate. While still a student he worked as a piano teacher and choir director. He was a secondary school teacher in Wittlich and Mainz, taught French at the Volkshochschule in Mainz and was a lecturer at the university institute there, became head of the youth music school and director of the Mainz Peter Cornelius Conservatory.

In 1964 he became full professor of musicology and music education at the Staatliche Hochschule für Musik und Theater in Hannover, became director of its predecessor institute (the Musikhochschule) in 1968 and founding president of the Hochschule für Musik und Theater in 1979, a position he held until his retirement in 1993. Under him, the university gained the right to award doctorates and habilitations, and under him, the new building and the establishment of theatre and journalism departments were built. He later became an honorary citizen of the Hanover University of Music and Drama. From 1976 he also held a teaching position for musicology at the Leibniz University of Hanover, where he became an honorary professor in 1981.

He advocated the inclusion of the local musical cultures of the Third World in music education (he was also on the Council of the Goethe Institutes). For a long time he represented the interests of the art and music academies in the West German Rectors' Conference. He travelled a lot and was very active and well known as a cultural networker.

He was president and from 1988 honorary member of the Deutscher Musikrat. Jakoby was editor of the Musikalmanach - Musikleben in Deutschland and the magazines Musik und Bildung and Musikforum.

Jakoby was also a music and theatre critic for newspapers and an employee of the Süddeutsche and Westdeutsche Rundfunk. He received the Lower Saxony Prize for Culture, the Deutscher Musikpreis, the Plaque of Honour of the City of Hanover and the Order of Merit of the Federal Republic of Germany.

He had been married to Irmgard Mohr since 1955 and lived in Hannover and Dreis. The concert hall of the Musikhochschule was named after him on his 80th birthday.

Jakoby died in Hanover at the age of 87.

== Writings ==
- The Cantata. (1968)8
- Richard Jakoby (ed.): Staatliche Hochschule für Musik und Theater Hannover. Struktur, Zielsetzungen, Geschichte. Hannover: Madsack, 1973
- Zum Wandel der Musikanschauungen von der Antike bis zur Gegenwart. Göttingen, 1981
- Richard Jakoby : Leben und Werk. Hanover, 2006
- Studying music in the Federal Republic of Germany : music, music education, musicology : study guide.

== Literature ==
- Deutscher Musikrat (ed.): Richard Jakoby, Leben und Werk, Hanover 2006
