= Airship =

Powered lighter-than-air aircraft

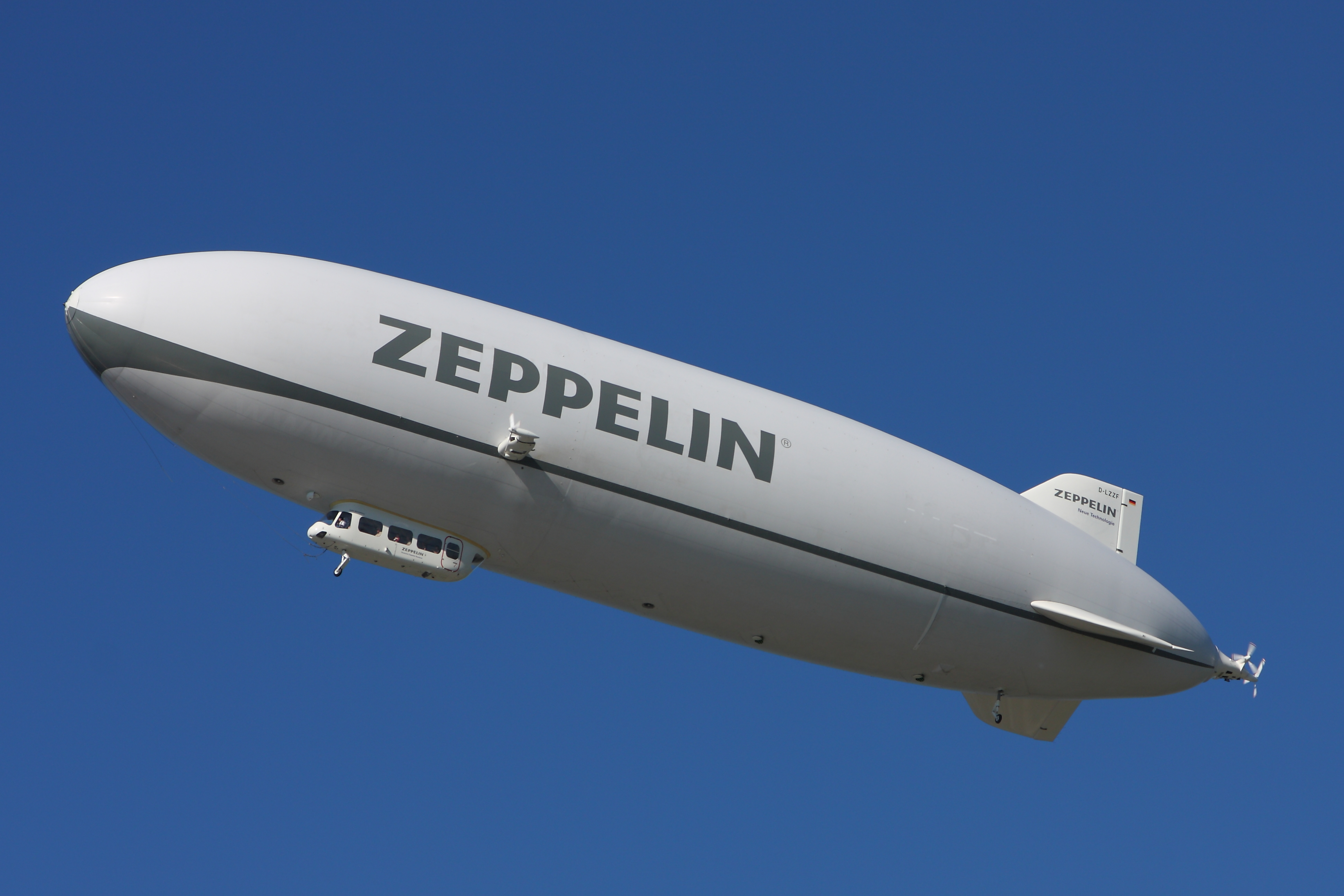
A modern airship, Zeppelin NT D-LZZF in 2010

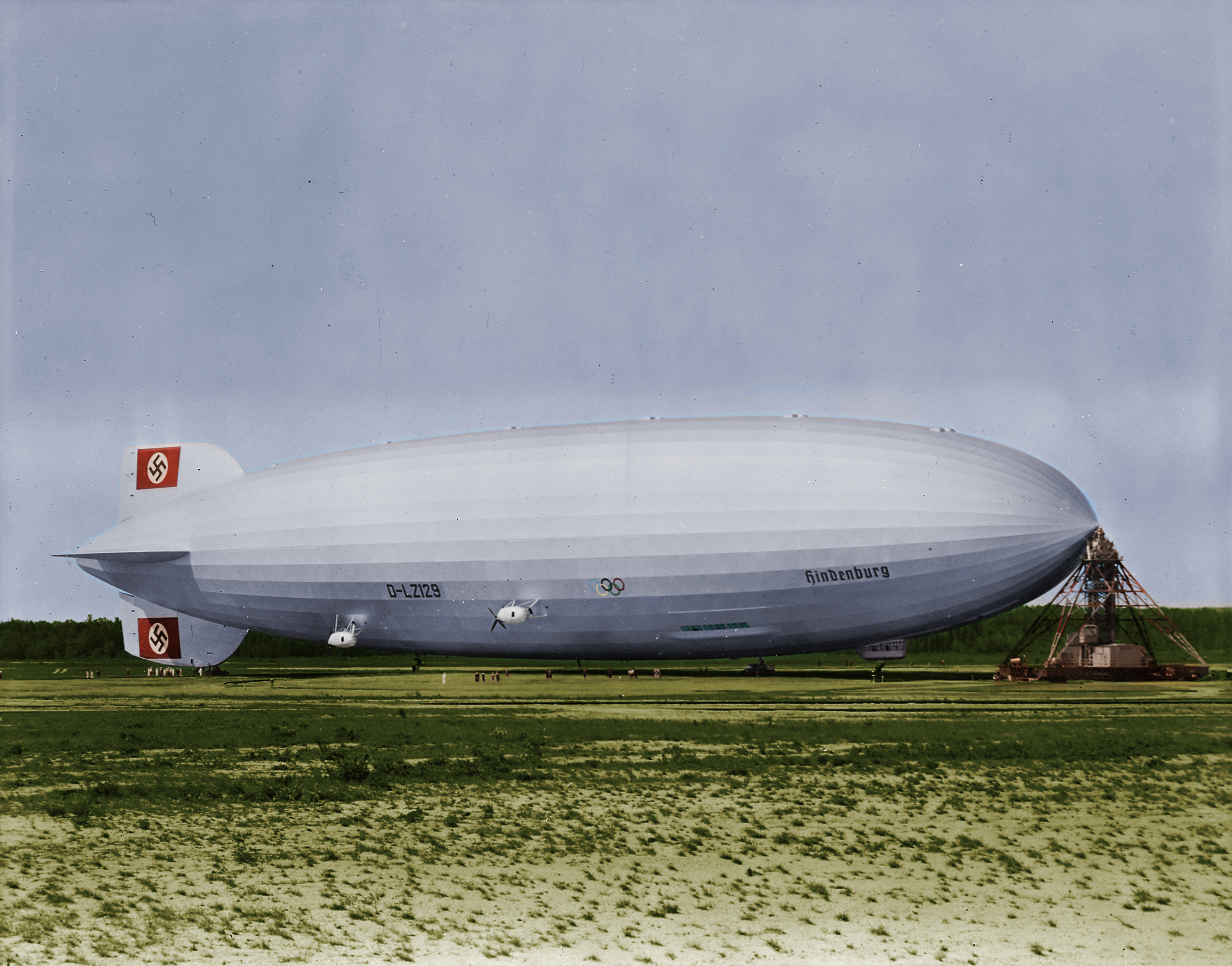
The LZ 129 Hindenburg and LZ 130 Graf Zeppelin II were the largest airships ever built

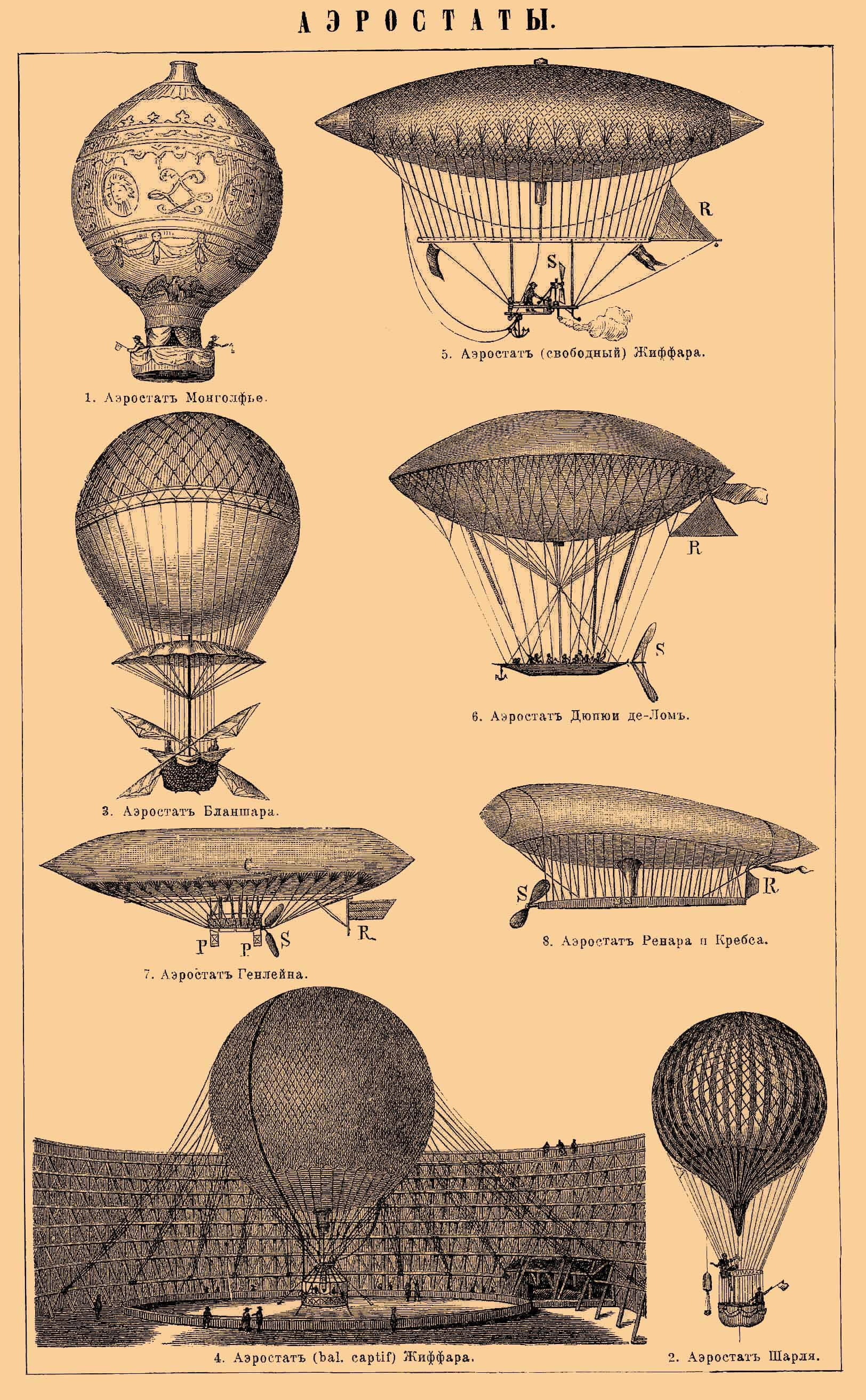
Dirigible airships compared with related aerostats, from the Brockhaus and Efron Encyclopedic Dictionary, 1890–1907

An airship, dirigible balloon or dirigible is a type of aerostat (lighter-than-air) aircraft that can navigate through the air flying under its own power. Aerostats use buoyancy from a lifting gas that is less dense than the surrounding air to achieve the lift needed to stay airborne.

In early dirigibles, the lifting gas was hydrogen, due to its high lifting capacity and ready availability. Still, its inherent flammability led to several fatal accidents, rendering hydrogen airships obsolete. The alternative lifting gas, helium, is not flammable, but is rare and relatively expensive. Significant amounts were first discovered in the United States and for a while helium was only available for airship usage in North America. Most airships built since the 1960s have used helium, though some have used hot air. (Note: A few airships after World War II still used hydrogen. The first British airship to use helium was the Chitty Bang Bang of 1967.)

The bulk of an airship consists of the lighter-than-air envelope, which may either form the gasbag itself or contain some gas-filled cells. The engines, crew, and payload capacity necessary for the airship's operation are instead housed in the gondola, one or more enclosed platforms suspended below the envelope.

The main types of airship are non-rigid, semi-rigid, and rigid airships. Non-rigid airships, often called "blimps", rely solely on internal gas pressure to maintain the envelope shape. Semi-rigid airships maintain their shape by internal pressure, but have some form of supporting structure, such as a fixed keel, attached to it. Rigid airships have an outer structural framework that maintains the shape and carries all structural loads, while the lifting gas is contained in one or more internal gasbags or cells. Rigid airships were first flown by Count Ferdinand von Zeppelin, and the vast majority of rigid airships built were manufactured by the firm he founded, Luftschiffbau Zeppelin. As a result, rigid airships are often called zeppelins.

Airships were the first aircraft capable of controlled, powered flight, with their greatest period of use before the 1950s; their decline began as aeroplanes surpassed their capabilities and was accelerated by a series of high-profile accidents, including the 1930 crash and burning of the British R101 in France, the 1933 and 1935 storm-related crashes of the twin airborne aircraft carrier U.S. Navy rigids, the USS Akron and USS Macon respectively, and the 1937 explosion of the German hydrogen-filled Hindenburg. Since the 1960s, helium inflated non-rigid airships have been used where the ability to hover for extended periods outweighs the need for speed and maneuverability, such as for advertising, tourism, camera platforms, geological surveys, and aerial observation.

== Terminology ==
Ballon-Poisson, a navigable balloon designed by aeronaut Ferdinand Lagleize, c. 1850

=== Airship ===
In the pioneer years of aeronautics, terms such as "airship", "air-ship", "air ship", and "ship of the air" were used to refer to any navigable or dirigible flying machine. In 1919 Frederick Handley Page was reported as referring to "ships of the air", with smaller passenger types as "air yachts". In the 1930s, large intercontinental flying boats were also sometimes referred to as "ships of the air" or "flying-ships". Nowadays, the term "airship" is used only for powered, dirigible balloons, with sub-types being classified as rigid, semi-rigid, or non-rigid. Semi-rigid architecture is the more recent, following advances in deformable structures and the exigency of reducing the weight and volume of the airships. They have a minimal structure that maintains the shape in concert with the overpressure of the gas envelope.

=== Aerostat ===
An aerostat is an aircraft that remains aloft using buoyancy or static lift, as opposed to the aerodyne, which obtains lift by moving through the air. Airships are a type of aerostat. The term aerostat has also been used to indicate a tethered or moored balloon as opposed to a free-floating balloon. Aerostats today are capable of lifting a payload of 3,000 pounds (1,400 kg) to an altitude of more than 4.5 kilometres (2.8 mi) above sea level. They can also stay in the air for extended periods of time, particularly when powered by an on-board generator or if the tether contains electrical conductors. Because of this capability, aerostats can serve as platforms for telecommunications services. For instance, Platform Wireless International Corporation announced in 2001 that it would use a tethered 1,250 pounds (570 kg) airborne payload to deliver cellular phone service to a 140 miles (230 km) region in Brazil. The European Union's ABSOLUTE project was also reportedly exploring the use of tethered aerostat stations to provide telecommunications during disaster response.

=== Blimp ===
A blimp is a non-rigid aerostat. In British usage, it refers to any non-rigid aerostat, including barrage balloons and other kite balloons, having a streamlined shape and stabilising tail fins. Some blimps may be powered dirigibles, as in early versions of the Goodyear Blimp. Later Goodyear dirigibles, though technically semi-rigid airships, have still been called "blimps" by the company.

=== Zeppelin ===
The term zeppelin originally referred to airships manufactured by the German Zeppelin Company, which built and operated the first rigid airships in the early years of the twentieth century. The initials LZ, for Luftschiff Zeppelin (German for "Zeppelin airship"), were usually prefixed to their craft's serial identifiers.

Streamlined rigid (or semi-rigid) airships are often referred to as "Zeppelins", because of the fame that this company acquired due to the number of airships it produced, although its early rival was the Parseval semi-rigid design.

=== Hybrid airship ===
Hybrid airships fly with a positive aerostatic contribution, usually equal to the empty weight of the system, and the variable payload is sustained by propulsion or aerodynamic contribution.

== Classification ==
Airships are classified according to their method of construction into rigid, semi-rigid, and non-rigid types.

=== Rigid ===
A rigid airship has a rigid framework covered by an outer skin or envelope. The interior contains one or more gasbags, cells, or balloons to provide lift. Rigid airships are typically unpressurised and can be made to virtually any size. Most, but not all, of the German Zeppelin airships have been of this type.

=== Semi-rigid ===
A semi-rigid airship has some supporting structure, but the main envelope is held in shape by the internal pressure of the lifting gas. Typically, the airship has an extended, usually articulated keel running along the bottom of the envelope to stop it kinking in the middle by distributing suspension loads into the envelope, while also allowing lower envelope pressures.

=== Non-rigid ===
Non-rigid airships are often called "blimps". A famous example is the American Goodyear airships, though not all have been blimps.

A non-rigid airship relies entirely on internal gas pressure to retain its shape during flight. Unlike a rigid airship's gas envelope, the non-rigid airship's gas envelope has no compartments. However, it still typically has smaller internal bags containing air (ballonets). As altitude increases, the lifting gas expands, and air from the ballonets is expelled through valves to maintain the hull's shape. To return to sea level, the process is reversed: air is forced back into the ballonets by scooping air from the engine exhaust and using auxiliary blowers.

== Construction ==
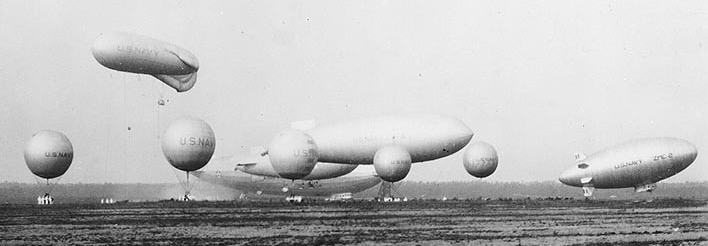
U.S. Navy airships and balloons, 1931: in the background, ZR-3, in front of it, (l to r) J-3 or 4, K-1, ZMC-2, in front of them, "Caquot" observation balloon, and in foreground free balloons used for training

=== Envelope ===
The envelope is the structure that contains the buoyant gas. Envelopes in the early 19th century were made from goldbeater's skin, selected for its low weight, relatively high strength, and impermeability compared to paper or linen. By the 1920s, natural rubber treated with cotton became the predominant elastomer used in envelope construction. Natural rubber was succeeded by neoprene in the 1930s and by Nylon and PET in the 1950s. A few airships have been metal-clad. The most successful of which is the Detroit ZMC-2, which logged 2265 hours of flight time from 1929 to 1941 before being scrapped, as it was considered too small for operational use on anti-submarine patrols.

The problem of the exact determination of the pressure on an airship envelope is still problematic and has fascinated major scientists such as Theodor Von Karman.

The envelope may contain ballonets (see below), allowing adjustment of the buoyant gas density by adding or removing envelope volume.

=== Ballonet ===
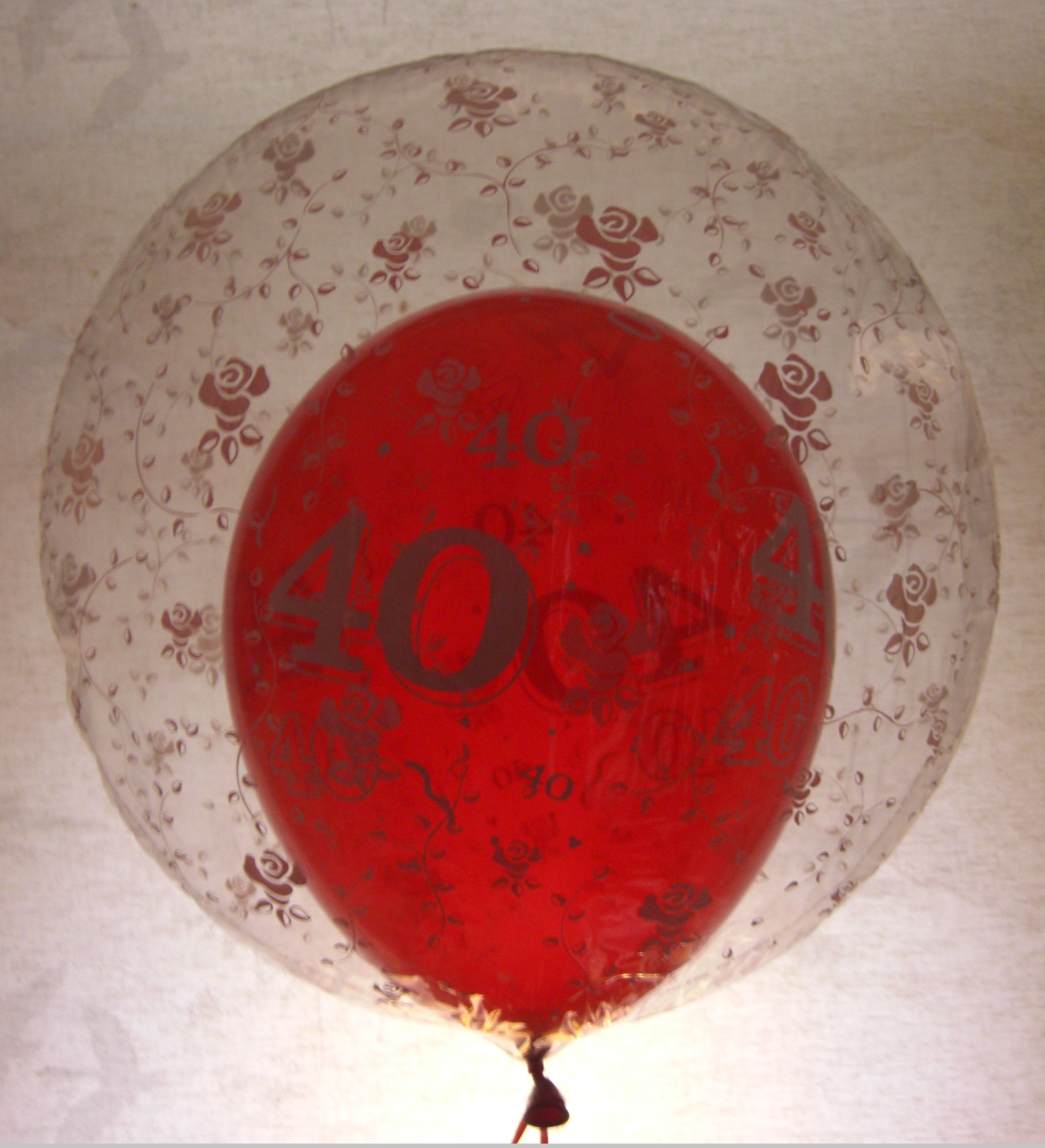
The air-filled red balloon acts as a simple ballonet inside the outer balloon, which is filled with lifting gas.

A ballonet is an air bag inside the outer envelope of an airship, which, when inflated, reduces the volume available for the lifting gas, making it denser. Because air is denser than the lifting gas, inflating the ballonet reduces overall lift, while deflating it increases it. In this way, the ballonet can be used to adjust the lift as required by controlling the buoyancy. By inflating or deflating ballonets strategically, the pilot can control the airship's altitude and attitude.

Ballonets may typically be used in non-rigid or semi-rigid airships, commonly with multiple ballonets located both fore and aft to maintain balance and to control the pitch of the airship.

=== Lifting gas ===
Lifting gas is generally hydrogen, helium, or hot air.

Hydrogen provides the highest lift 1.1 kg/m^{3} (0.069 lb/cu ft) and is inexpensive and readily available, but is highly flammable and can detonate when mixed with air. Helium is completely non flammable, but gives lower performance-1.02 kg/m^{3} (0.064 lb/cu ft) and is a rare element and much more expensive.

Thermal airships use a heated lifting gas, usually air, in a fashion similar to hot air balloons. The first to do so was flown in 1973 by the British company Cameron Balloons.

=== Gondola ===
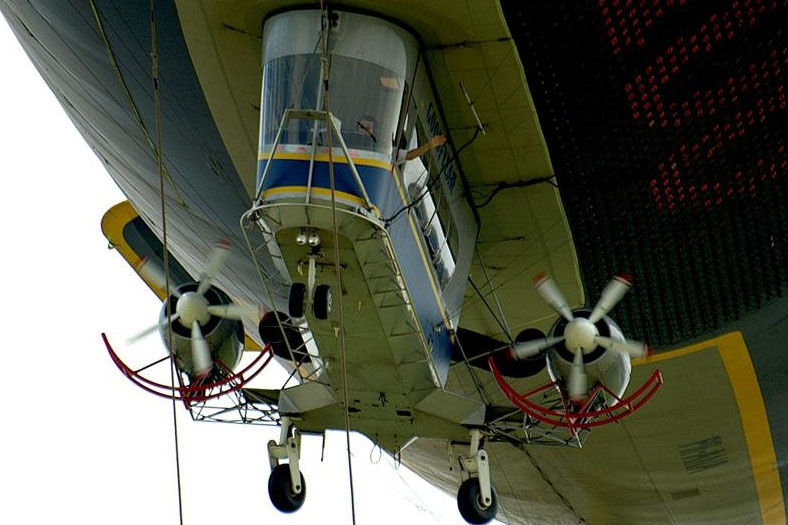
A gondola fitted with twin propellers

=== Propulsion and control ===
Small airships carry their engine(s) in their gondola. Where there were multiple engines on larger airships, these were placed in separate nacelles, termed power cars or engine cars. To allow asymmetric thrust to be applied for maneuvering, these power cars were mounted towards the sides of the envelope, away from the centre line gondola. This also raised them above the ground, reducing the risk of a propeller strike when landing. Widely spaced power cars were also termed wing cars, from the use of "wing" to mean being on the side of something, as in a theatre, rather than the aerodynamic device. These engine cars carried a crew during flight who maintained the engines as needed, but who also worked the engine controls, throttle, etc., mounted directly on the engine. Instructions were relayed to them from the pilot's station by a telegraph system, as on a ship.

If fuel is burnt for propulsion, then a progressive reduction in the airship's overall weight occurs. In hydrogen airships, this is usually dealt with by simply venting cheap hydrogen lifting gas. In helium airships, water is often condensed from the exhaust and stored as ballast.

=== Fins and rudders ===
To control the airship's direction and stability, it is equipped with fins and rudders. Fins are typically located on the tail section and provide stability and resistance to rolling. Rudders are movable surfaces on the tail that allow the pilot to steer the airship left or right.

=== Empennage ===
The empennage is the tail section of the airship, which includes the fins, rudders, and other aerodynamic surfaces. It plays a crucial role in maintaining stability and controlling the airship's attitude.

=== Fuel and power systems ===
Airships require a source of power to operate their propulsion systems. This includes engines, generators, or batteries, depending on the airship's type and design. Fuel tanks or batteries are typically located within the envelope or gondola.

=== Navigation and communication equipment ===
To navigate safely and communicate with ground control or other aircraft, airships are equipped with a range of instruments, including GPS systems, radios, radar, and navigation lights.

=== Landing gear ===
Some airships have landing gear that allows them to land on runways or other surfaces. This landing gear may include wheels, skids, or landing pads.

== Performance ==
=== Efficiency ===
The main advantage of airships with respect to any other vehicle is that they require less energy to remain in flight, compared to other air vehicles. The proposed Varialift airship, powered by a mixture of solar-powered engines and conventional jet engines, would use only an estimated 8 percent of the fuel required by jet aircraft. Furthermore, utilizing the jet stream could allow for a faster and more energy-efficient cargo transport alternative to maritime shipping. This is one of the reasons why China has embraced their use recently.

== History ==
=== Early pioneers ===
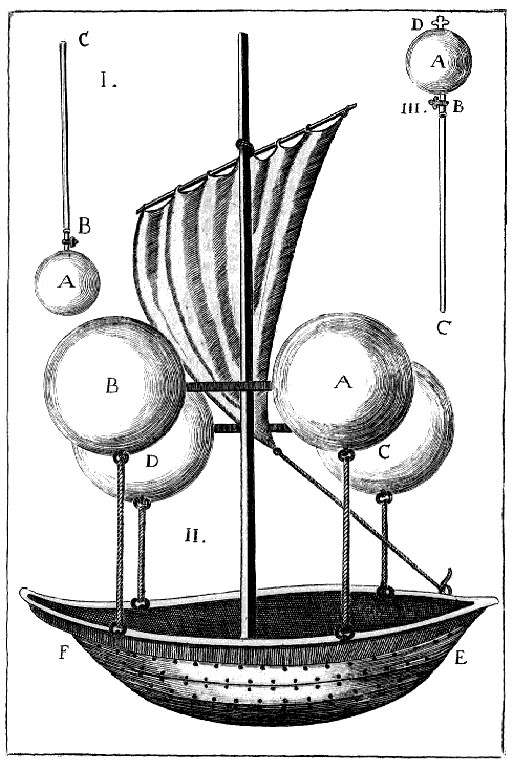
Francesco Lana de Terzi's Aerial Ship design of 1670

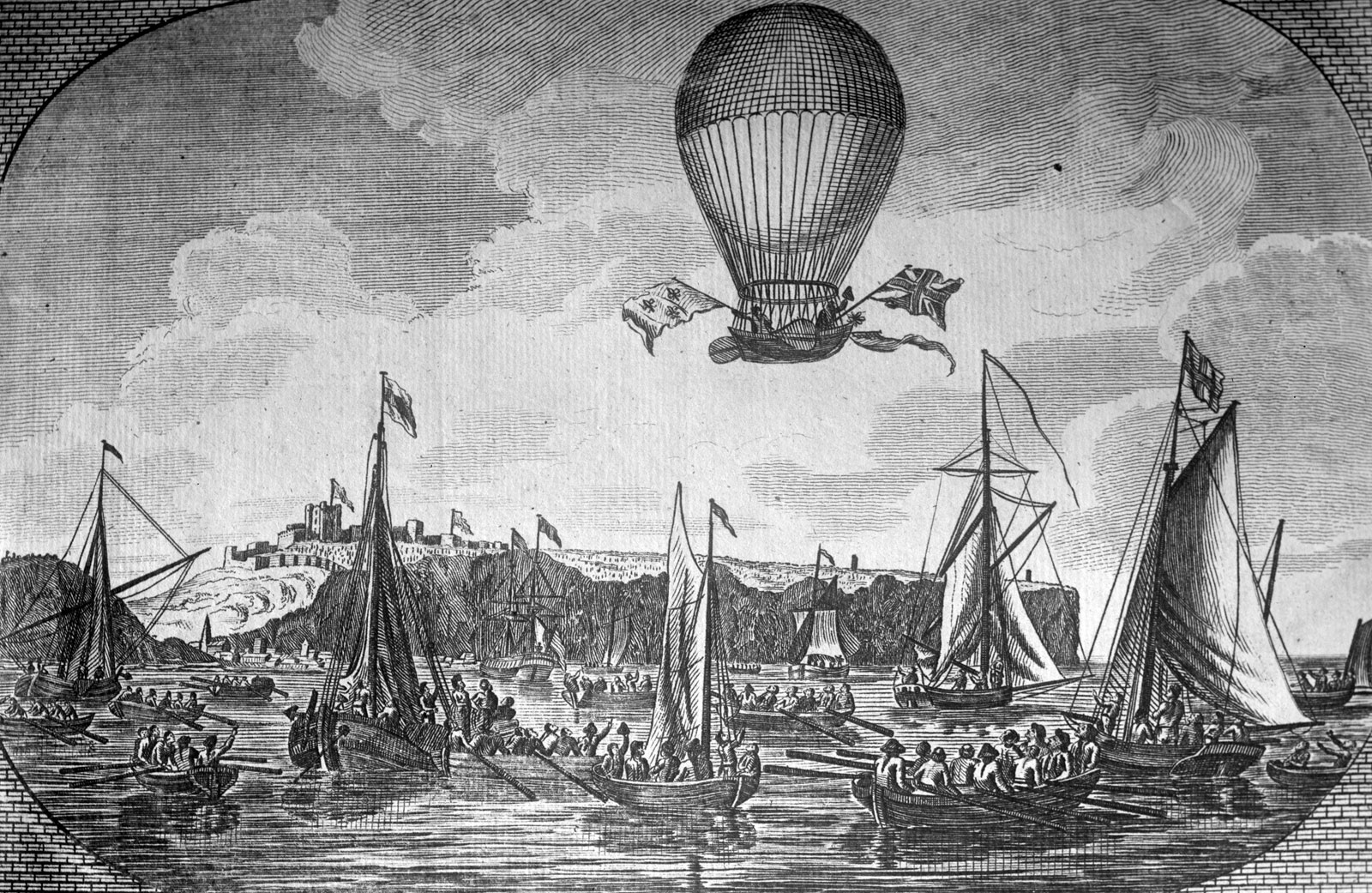
Crossing of the English Channel by Blanchard in 1785

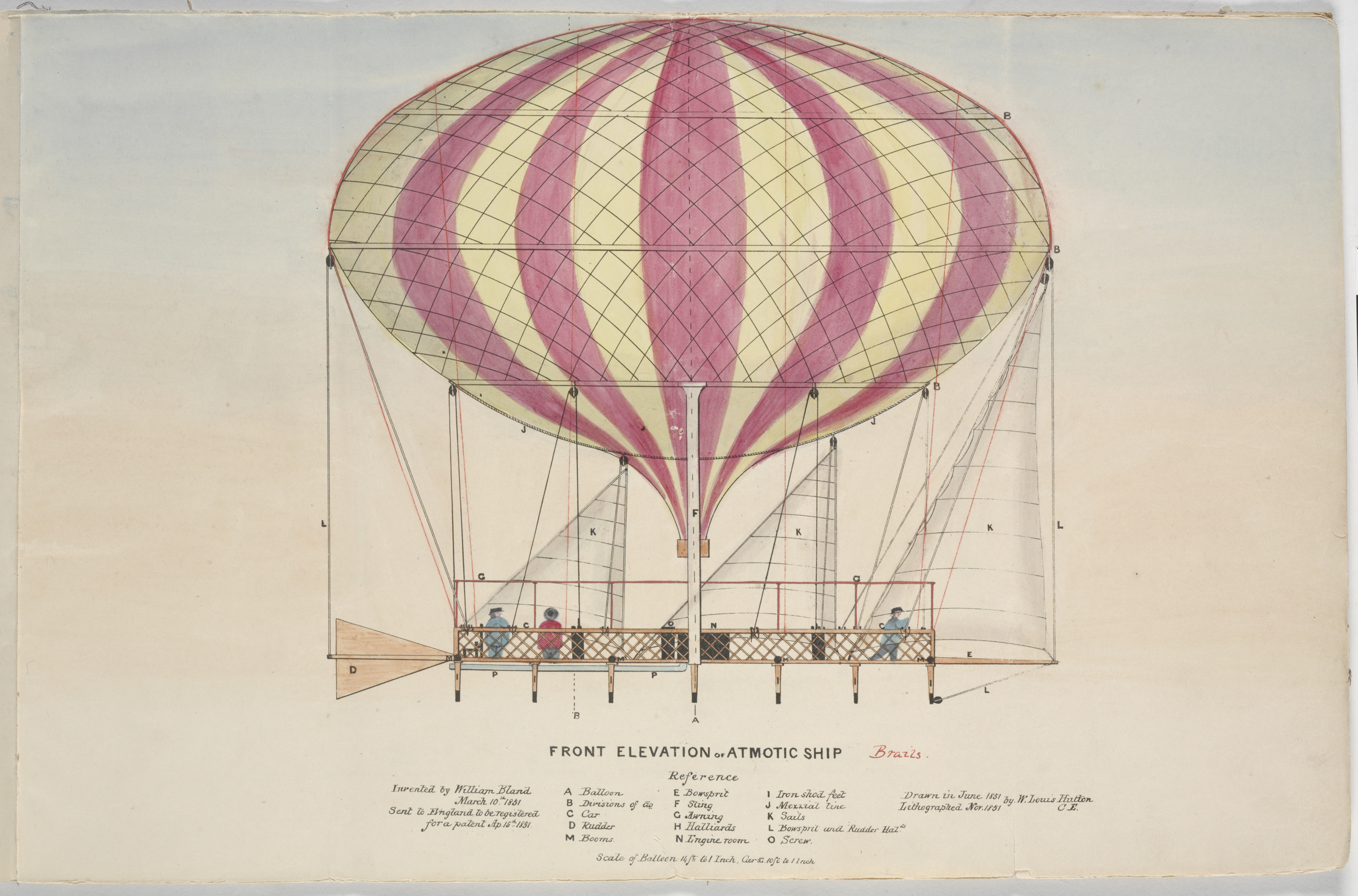
Bland's 1851 Atmotic Ship design p. 3

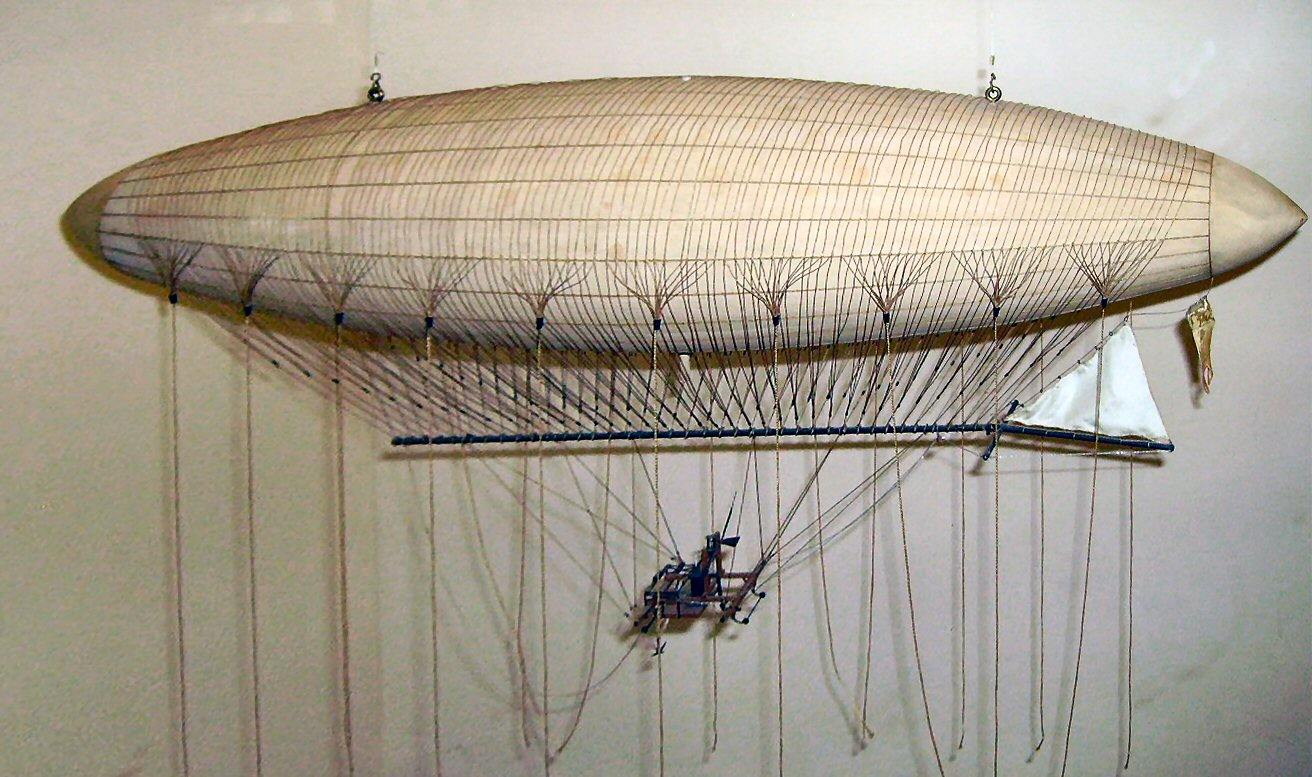
A model of the 1852 Giffard airship at the London Science Museum

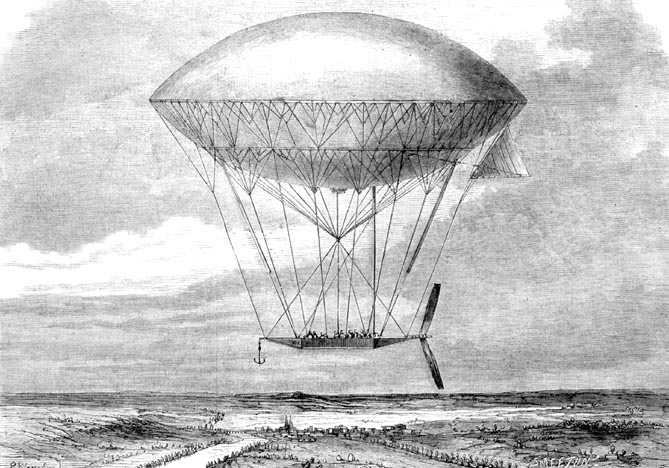
The navigable balloon developed by Henri Dupuy de Lôme in 1872

==== 17th–18th century ====
In 1670, the Jesuit Father Francesco Lana de Terzi, sometimes referred to as the "Father of Aeronautics", published a description of an "Aerial Ship" supported by four copper spheres from which the air was evacuated. Although the basic principle is sound, such a craft was unrealizable then and remains so to the present day, since external air pressure would cause the spheres to collapse unless their thickness were such as to make them too heavy to be buoyant. A hypothetical craft constructed using this principle is known as a vacuum airship.

In 1709, the Brazilian-Portuguese Jesuit priest Bartolomeu de Gusmão made a hot-air balloon, the Passarola, ascend to the skies before an astonished Portuguese court. It would have been on August 8, 1709, when Father Bartolomeu de Gusmão held, in the courtyard of the Casa da Índia, in the city of Lisbon, the first Passarola demonstration. The balloon caught fire without leaving the ground, but, in a second demonstration, it rose to 95 meters in height. It was a small balloon of thick brown paper, filled with hot air, produced by the "fire of material contained in a clay bowl embedded in the base of a waxed wooden tray". The event was witnessed by King John V of Portugal and the future Pope Innocent XIII.

A more practical dirigible airship was described by Lieutenant Jean Baptiste Marie Meusnier in a paper entitled "Mémoire sur l'équilibre des machines aérostatiques" (Memorandum on the equilibrium of aerostatic machines) presented to the French Academy on 3 December 1783. The 16 watercolor drawings published the following year depict a 260-foot-long (79 m) streamlined envelope with internal ballonets that could be used for regulating lift: this was attached to a long carriage that could be used as a boat if the vehicle was forced to land in water. The airship was designed to be driven by three propellers and steered with a sail-like aft rudder. In 1784, Jean-Pierre Blanchard fitted a hand-powered propeller to a balloon, the first recorded means of propulsion carried aloft. In 1785, he crossed the English Channel in a balloon equipped with flapping wings for propulsion and a birdlike tail for steering.

==== 19th century ====
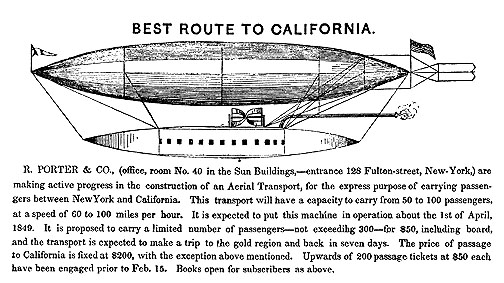
1849 Rufus Porter design

The 19th century saw continued attempts to add methods of propulsion to balloons. Rufus Porter built and flew scale models of his "Aerial Locomotive", but never a successful full-size implementation. The Australian William Bland sent designs for his "Atmotic airship" to the Great Exhibition held in London in 1851, where a model was displayed. This was an elongated balloon with a steam engine driving twin propellers suspended underneath. The balloon's lift was estimated at 5 tons, and the car with fuel at 3.5 tons, giving a payload of 1.5 tons. Bland believed that the machine could be driven at 80 km/h (50 mph) and could fly from Sydney to London in less than a week.

In 1852, Henri Giffard became the first person to make an engine-powered flight when he flew 27 km (17 mi) in a steam-powered airship. Airships would develop considerably over the next two decades. In 1863, Solomon Andrews flew his aereon design, an unpowered, controllable dirigible in Perth Amboy, New Jersey, and offered the device to the U.S. Military during the Civil War. He flew a later design in 1866 around New York City and as far as Oyster Bay, New York. This concept used changes in lift to provide propulsive force and did not need a powerplant. In 1872, the French naval architect Dupuy de Lôme launched a large navigable balloon, which was propelled by a propeller driven by eight men. It was developed during the Franco-Prussian war and was intended as an improvement to the balloons used for communications between Paris and the countryside during the siege of Paris, but was completed only after the end of the war.

In 1872, Paul Haenlein flew an airship with an internal combustion engine running on the coal gas used to inflate the envelope, the first use of such an engine to power an aircraft. Charles F. Ritchel made a public demonstration flight in 1878 of his hand-powered one-person rigid airship, and went on to build and sell five of his aircraft.

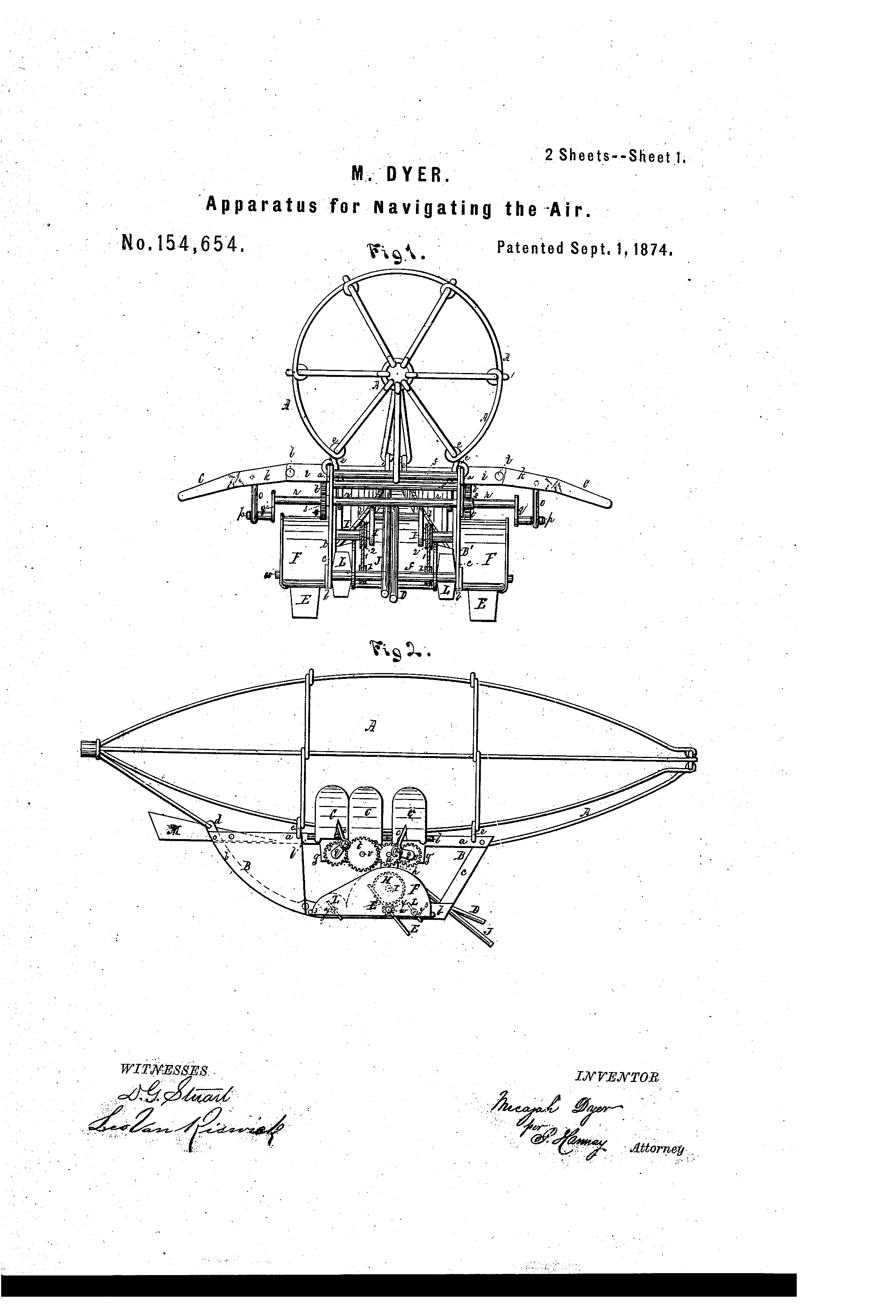
Dyer Airship 1874 patent drawing page 1

In 1874, Micajah Clark Dyer filed U.S. Patent 154,654 "Apparatus for Navigating the Air". It is believed successful trial flights were made between 1872 and 1874, but detailed dates are not available. The apparatus used a combination of wings and paddle wheels for navigation and propulsion.

In operating the machinery the wings receive an upward and downward motion, in the manner of the wings of a bird, the outer ends yielding as they are raised, but opening out and then remaining rigid while being depressed. The wings, if desired, may be set at an angle so as to propel forward as well as to raise the machine in the air. The paddle-wheels are intended to be used for propelling the machine, in the same way that a vessel is propelled in water. An instrument answering to a rudder is attached for guiding the machine. A balloon is to be used for elevating the flying ship, after which it is to be guided and controlled at the pleasure of its occupants.

More details can be found in the book about his life.

In 1883, the first electric-powered flight was made by Gaston Tissandier, who fitted a 1.5 hp (1.1 kW) Siemens electric motor to an airship.

The first fully controllable free flight was made in 1884 by Charles Renard and Arthur Constantin Krebs in the French Army airship La France. La France made the first flight of an airship that landed where it took off; the 170 ft (52 m) long, 66,000 ft^{3} (1,900 m^{3}) airship covered 8 km (5.0 mi) in 23 minutes with the aid of an 8.5 hp (6.3 kW) electric motor, and a 435 kg (959 lb) battery. It made seven flights in 1884 and 1885.

In 1888, the design of the Campbell Air Ship, designed by Professor Peter C. Campbell, was built by the Novelty Air Ship Company. It was lost at sea in 1889 while being flown by Professor Hogan during an exhibition flight.

From 1888 to 1897, Friedrich Wölfert built three airships powered by Daimler Motoren Gesellschaft-built petrol engines, the last of which, Deutschland, caught fire in flight and killed both occupants in 1897. The 1888 version used a 2 hp (1.5 kW) single cylinder Daimler engine and flew 10 km (6 mi) from Canstatt to Kornwestheim.

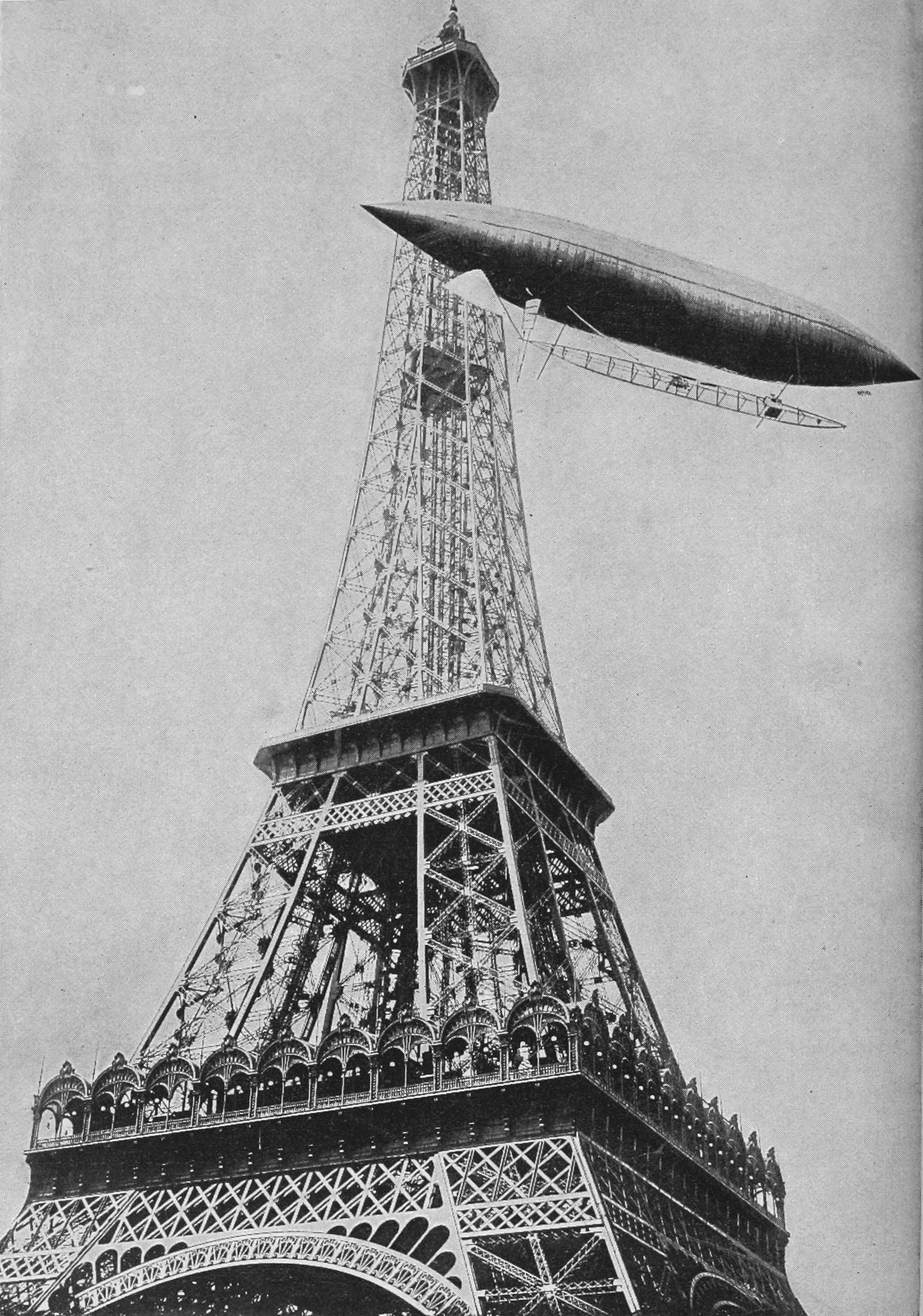
Santos-Dumont No. 6 rounding the Eiffel Tower in 1901

In 1897, an airship with an aluminum envelope was built by the Hungarian-Croatian engineer David Schwarz. It made its first flight at Tempelhof field in Berlin after Schwarz had died. His widow, Melanie Schwarz, was paid 15,000 marks by Count Ferdinand von Zeppelin to release the industrialist Carl Berg from his exclusive contract to supply Schwartz with aluminium.

From 1897 to 1899, Konstantin Danilewsky, a medical doctor and inventor from Kharkov, built four muscle-powered airships with a gas volume of 150–180 m^{3} (5,300–6,400 cu ft). About 200 ascents were made within the framework of an experimental flight program, at two locations, with no significant incidents.

=== Early 20th century ===
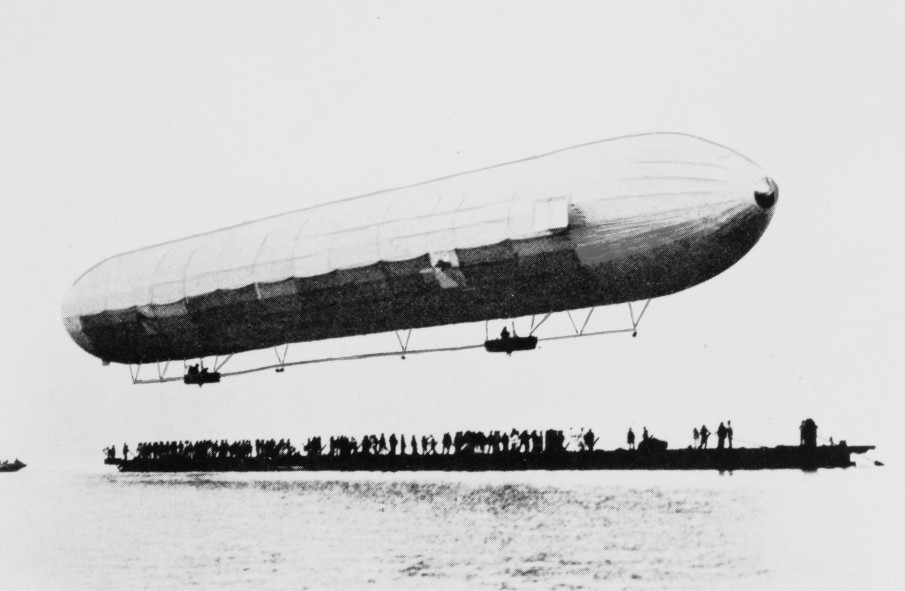
LZ1, Count Zeppelin's first airship

In July 1900, the Luftschiff Zeppelin LZ1 made its first flight. This led to the most successful airships of all time: the Zeppelins, named after Count Ferdinand von Zeppelin, who began working on rigid airship designs in the 1890s, leading to the flawed LZ1 in 1900 and the more successful LZ2 in 1906. The Zeppelin airships had a framework composed of triangular lattice girders covered with fabric that contained separate gas cells. At first, multiplane tail surfaces were used for control and stability; later designs had simpler cruciform tail surfaces. The engines and crew were accommodated in "gondolas" hung beneath the hull, with driving propellers attached to the sides of the frame via long drive shafts. Additionally, there was a passenger compartment (later a bomb bay) located halfway between the two engine compartments.

Alberto Santos-Dumont was a wealthy young Brazilian who lived in France and had a passion for flying. He designed 18 balloons and dirigibles before turning his attention to fixed-wing aircraft. On 19 October 1901, he flew his airship Number 6, from the Parc Saint Cloud to and around the Eiffel Tower and back in under thirty minutes. This feat earned him the Deutsch de la Meurthe prize of 100,000 francs. Many inventors were inspired by Santos-Dumont's small airships. Many airship pioneers, such as the American Thomas Scott Baldwin, financed their activities through passenger flights and public demonstration flights. Stanley Spencer built the first British airship with funds from advertising baby food on the sides of the envelope. Others, such as Walter Wellman and Melvin Vaniman, set their sights on loftier goals, attempting two polar flights in 1907 and 1909, and two trans-Atlantic flights in 1910 and 1912.

Captain Tom Baldwin in flight on his balloon the "New California Arrow" during the dirigible races at the International Aeronautic Tournament in Forest Park, 23 October 1907

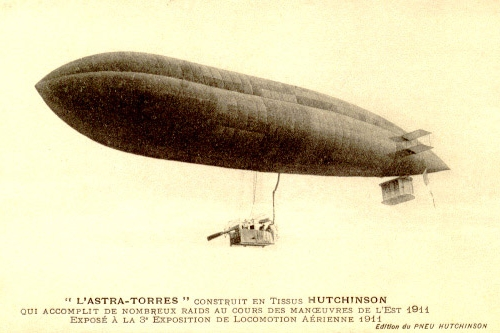
Astra-Torres airship No.1 at an air show in 1911

On May 12, 1902, the inventor and Brazilian aeronaut Augusto Severo de Albuquerque Maranhao and his French mechanic, Georges Saché, died while flying over Paris in the airship Pax. A marble plaque at number 81 of the Avenue du Maine in Paris commemorates the location of Augusto Severo's accident. The Catastrophe of the Balloon "Le Pax" is a 1902 short silent film recreation of the catastrophe, directed by Georges Méliès. That same year, Spanish engineer Leonardo Torres Quevedo published the details of an innovative airship design in Spain and France, titled Perfectionnements aux aerostats dirigibles" ("Improvements in dirigible aerostats"). Featuring a non-rigid body with internal bracing wires—a system known as "auto-rigid"—it overcame the structural flaws of both rigid (Zeppelin-type) and flexible aircraft. This configuration provided greater flight stability, enabling the use of heavier engines and a higher passenger capacity. In 1905, assisted by Captain Alfredo Kindelán, Torres built the airship Torres Quevedo at the Guadalajara military base. He patented an improved design in 1909 and offered it to the French Astra company, which began mass production in 1911 as the Astra-Torres airship. Torres also designed a docking station to resolve the technical challenges of mooring dirigibles. In 1910, he proposed securing the nose of an airship to a mooring mast, allowing the craft to weathervane as wind direction changed. This ground-erected metal column allowed airships to be moored in the open at any time, regardless of wind speed. Additionally, his design improved the accessibility of temporary landing sites for passenger disembarkation. He filed the final patent in Belgium in February 1911, and later in France and the United Kingdom in 1912, under the title "Improvements in Mooring Arrangements for Airships".

Other airship builders were also active before the war: from 1902 the French company Lebaudy Frères specialized in semirigid airships such as the Patrie and the République, designed by their engineer Henri Julliot, who later worked for the American company Goodrich; the German firm Schütte-Lanz built the wooden-framed SL series from 1911, introducing important technical innovations; another German firm Luft-Fahrzeug-Gesellschaft built the Parseval-Luftschiff (PL) series from 1909, and Italian Enrico Forlanini's firm had built and flown the first two Forlanini airships.

In Britain, the Army built its first dirigible, the Nulli Secundus, in 1907. The Navy ordered the construction of an experimental rigid in 1908. Officially known as His Majesty's Airship No. 1 and nicknamed the Mayfly, it broke its back in 1911 before making a single flight. Work on a successor did not start until 1913.

The German airship passenger service, known as DELAG (Deutsche-Luftschiffahrts AG), was established in 1910.

=== World War I ===
Italian military airship, 1908

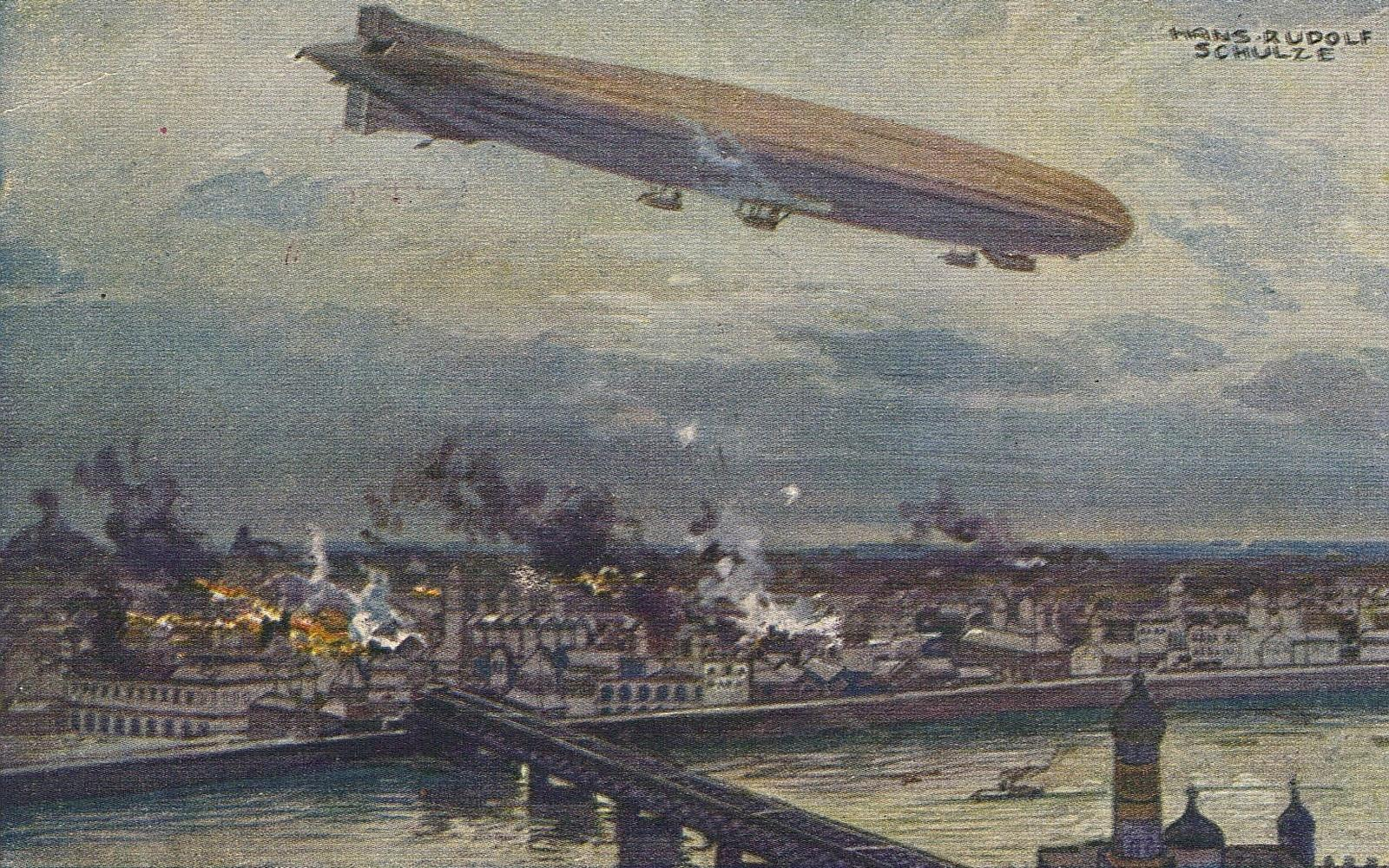
German airship Schütte Lanz SL2 bombing Warsaw in 1914

The prospect of airships as bombers had been recognized in Europe well before the airships were up to the task. H. G. Wells's The War in the Air (1908) described the obliteration of entire fleets and cities by airship attack. The Italian forces became the first to use dirigibles for military purposes during the Italo–Turkish War, with the first bombing mission flown on 10 March 1912. World War I marked the airship's real debut as a weapon. The Germans, French, and Italians all used airships for scouting and tactical bombing early in the war, and all learned that airships were too vulnerable for operations over the front. The decision to end operations in direct support of armies was made by all in 1917.

Many in the German military believed they had found the ideal weapon to counter British naval superiority and strike at Britain itself. In contrast, more realistic airship advocates believed the zeppelin's value lay in its role as a long-range scout-and-attack craft for naval operations. Raids on England began in January 1915 and peaked in 1916; following losses to British defences, only a few raids were conducted in 1917–18, the last in August 1918. Zeppelins proved to be terrifying but inaccurate weapons. Navigation, target selection, and bomb-aiming proved to be difficult under the best of conditions, and the cloud cover that was frequently encountered by the airships reduced accuracy even further. The physical damage done by airships over the course of the war was insignificant, and the deaths that they caused amounted to a few hundred. Nevertheless, the raids caused a significant diversion of British resources to defence efforts. The airships were initially immune to attack by aircraft and anti-aircraft guns: as the pressure in their envelopes was only just higher than ambient air, holes had little effect. But following the introduction of a combination of incendiary and explosive ammunition in 1916, their flammable hydrogen lifting gas made them vulnerable to the defending aeroplanes. Several were shot down in flames by British defenders, and many others were destroyed in accidents. New designs capable of reaching greater altitudes were developed, but while this made them immune to attack, it also worsened their bombing accuracy.

Countermeasures by the British included sound detection equipment, searchlights, and anti-aircraft artillery, followed by night fighters in 1915. One tactic used early in the war, when their limited range meant the airships had to fly from forward bases and the only zeppelin production facilities were in Friedrichshafen, was the British Royal Naval Air Service's bombing of airship sheds. Later in the war, the development of the aircraft carrier led to the first successful carrier-based air strike in history: on the morning of 19 July 1918, seven Sopwith 2F.1 Camels were launched from HMS Furious and struck the airship base at Tønder, destroying zeppelins L 54 and L 60.

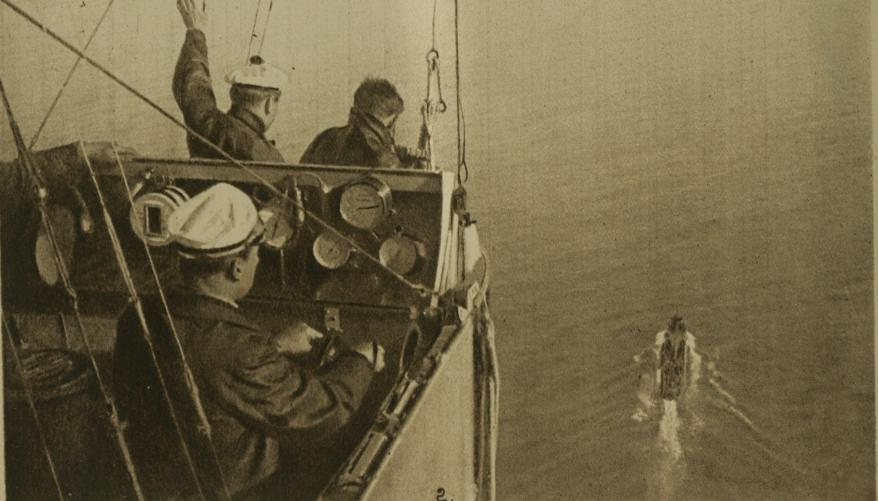
View from a French dirigible approaching a watership in 1918

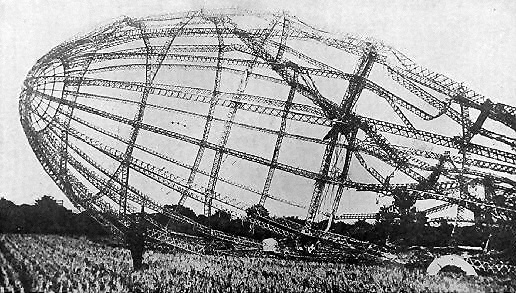
Wreckage of Zeppelin L31 or L32 shot down over England, 23 September 1916

The British Army had abandoned airship development in favour of aeroplanes before the start of the war, but the Royal Navy had recognized the need for small airships to counteract the submarine and mine threat in coastal waters. Beginning in February 1915, they began to develop the SS (Sea Scout) class of blimp. These had a small envelope of 1,699–1,982 m^{3} (60,000–70,000 ft^{3}) and at first used aircraft fuselages without the wing and tail surfaces as control cars. Later, more advanced blimps with purpose-built gondolas were used. The NS class (North Sea) were the largest and most effective non-rigid airships in British service, with a gas capacity of 10,200 m^{3} (360,000 ft^{3}), a crew of 10, and an endurance of 24 hours. Six 230 lb (100 kg) bombs were carried, as well as three to five machine guns. British blimps were used for scouting, mine clearance, and convoy patrol duties. During the war, the British operated over 200 non-rigid airships. The effectiveness of British non-rigid airships during the war relied heavily on the distinctive three-lobed envelope design developed for the Astra-Torres airships, which was incorporated into the Coastal, C Star and North Sea classes, utilizing them alongside other Entente powers for anti-submarine warfare. Several were sold to Russia, France, the United States, and Italy. The large number of trained crews, low attrition rate, and constant experimentation in handling techniques meant that at the war's end, Britain was the world leader in non-rigid airship technology.

The Royal Navy continued the development of rigid airships until the end of the war. Eight rigid airships had been completed by the armistice (No. 9r, four 23 Class, two R23X Class, and one R31 Class), although several more were in an advanced state of completion by the war's end. Both France and Italy continued to use airships throughout the war. France preferred the non-rigid type, whereas Italy flew 49 semi-rigid airships in both the scouting and bombing roles.

Aeroplanes had almost entirely replaced airships as bombers by the end of the war, and Germany's remaining zeppelins were destroyed by their crews, scrapped, or handed over to the Allied powers as war reparations. The British rigid airship program, which had mainly been a reaction to the potential threat of the German airships, was wound down.

=== The interwar period ===
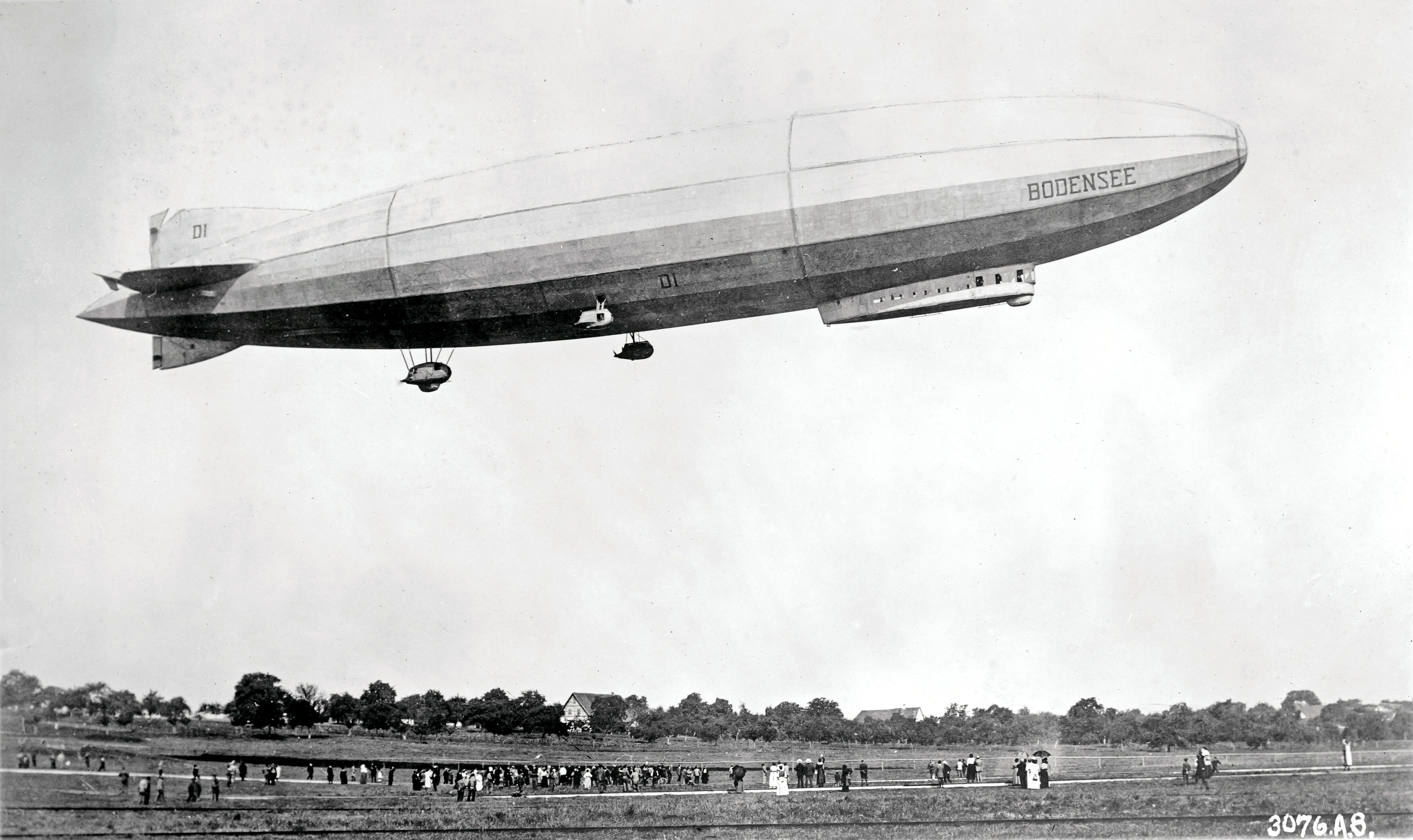
The Zeppelin LZ 120 Bodensee 1919

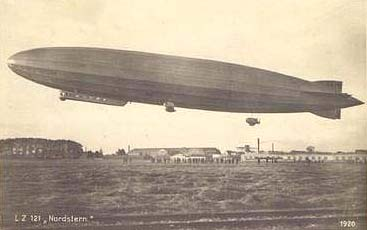
The LZ 121 Nordstern 1920

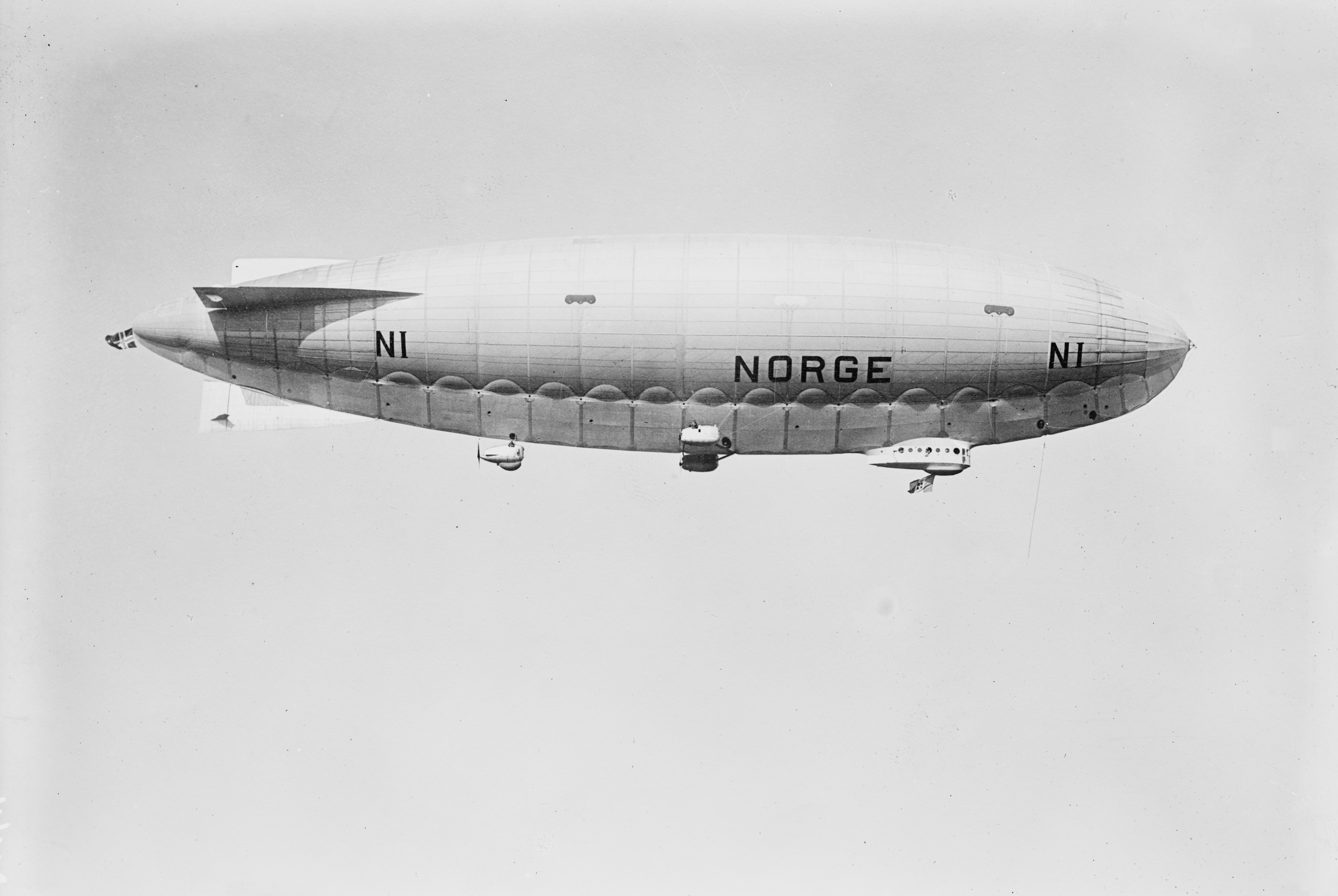
Norge airship in flight 1926

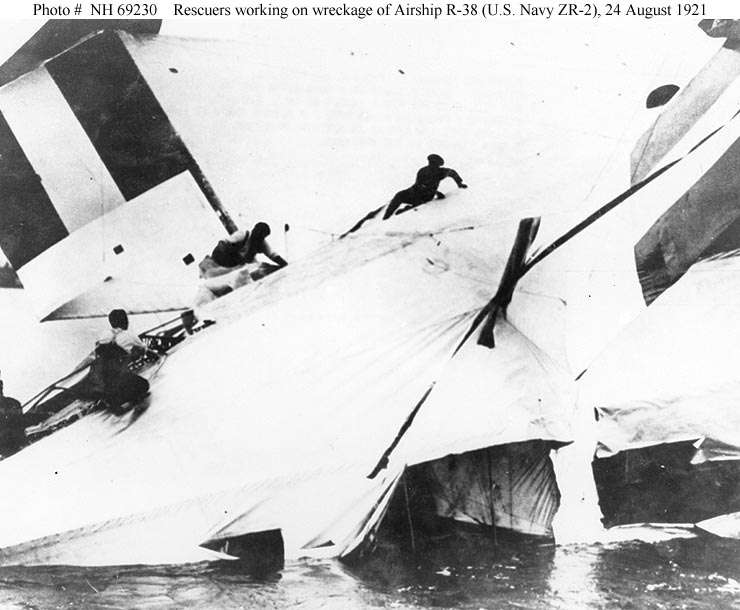
Rescuers scramble across the wreckage of British R-38/USN ZR-2, 24 August 1921.

Britain, the United States, and Germany built rigid airships between the two world wars. Italy and France made limited use of Zeppelins handed over as war reparations. Italy, the Soviet Union, the United States, and Japan mainly operated semi-rigid airships.

Under the terms of the Treaty of Versailles, Germany was not allowed to build airships of greater capacity than a million cubic feet. Two small passenger airships, LZ 120 Bodensee and its sister ship LZ 121 Nordstern, were built immediately after the war but were confiscated following the sabotage of the wartime Zeppelins that were to have been handed over as war reparations: Bodensee was given to Italy and Nordstern to France. On May 12, 1926, the Italian-built semi-rigid airship Norge was the first aircraft to fly over the North Pole.

The British R33 and R34 were improved versions of the German L 33, which had come down almost intact in Yorkshire on 24 September 1916. Despite being almost three years out of date by the time they were launched in 1919, they became two of the most successful airships in British service. The creation of the Royal Air Force (RAF) in early 1918 created a hybrid British airship program. The RAF was not interested in airships, while the Admiralty was, so a deal was made in which the Admiralty would design any future military airships and the RAF would handle workforce, facilities, and operations. On 2 July 1919, R34 began the first crossing of the Atlantic by a passenger aircraft. It landed at Mineola, Long Island on 6 July after 108 hours in the air; the return crossing began on 8 July and took 75 hours. This feat failed to generate enthusiasm for continued airship development, and the British airship program was rapidly wound down.

During World War I, the U.S. Navy acquired its first airship, the DH-1, but it was destroyed while being inflated shortly after delivery to the Navy. After the war, the U.S. Navy contracted to buy the R 38, which was being built in Britain, but before it was handed over, it was destroyed because of a structural failure during a test flight.

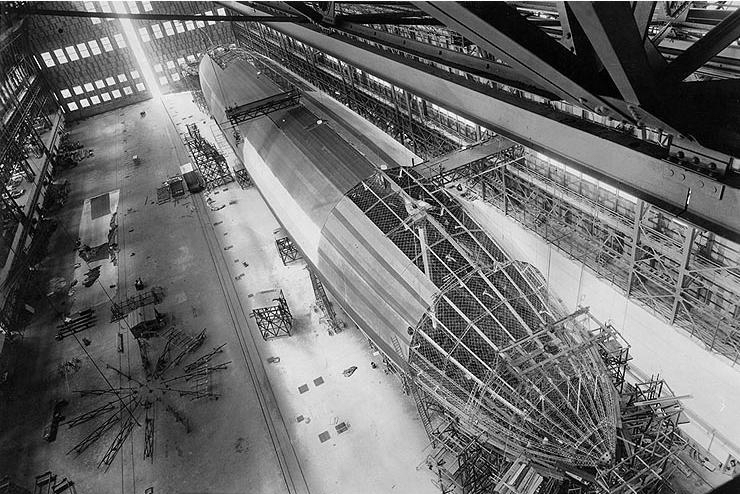
USS Shenandoah (ZR-1) during construction, 1923

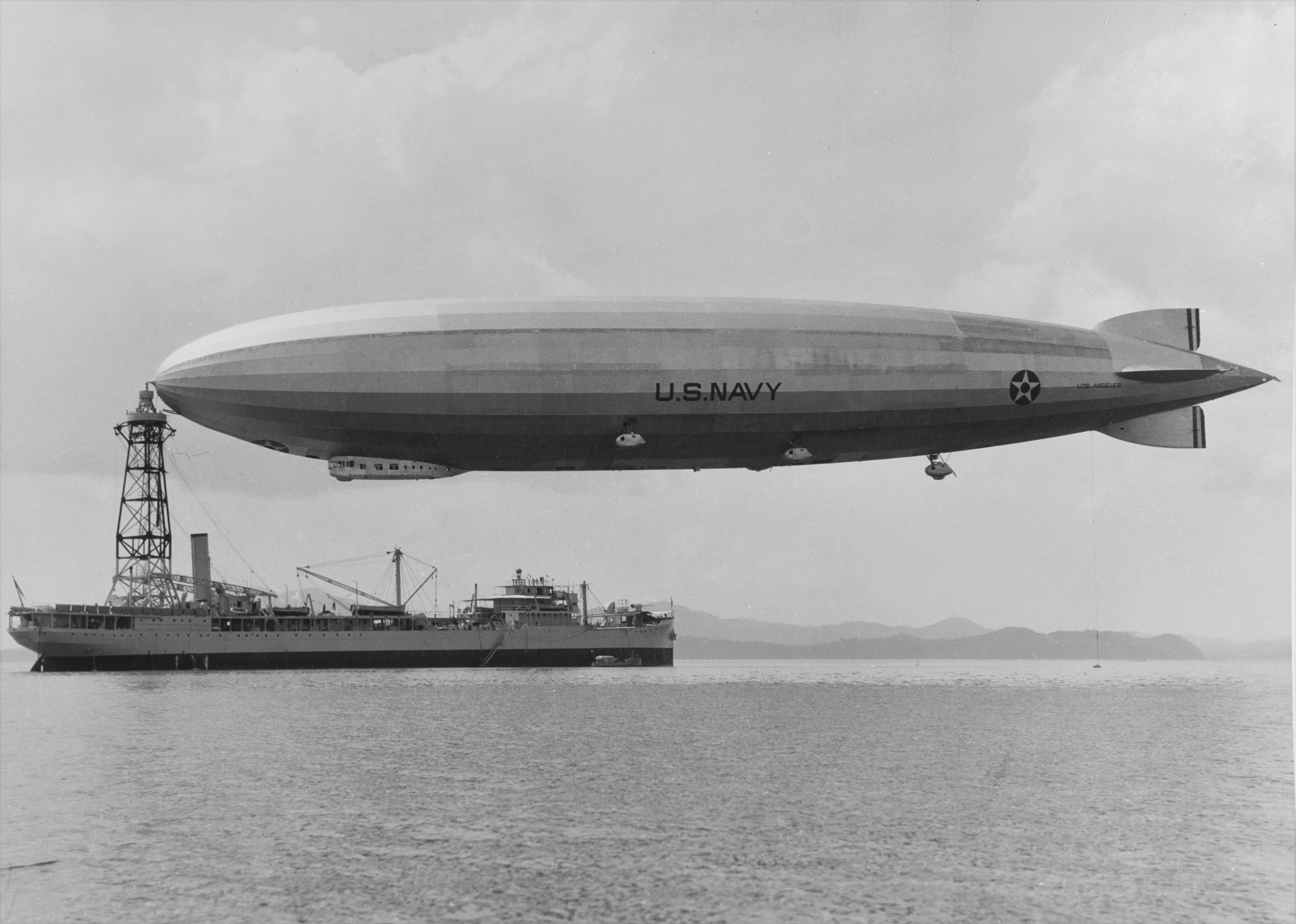
USS Los Angeles (ZR-3) beside tender USS Patoka February 1931

America then started constructing the USS Shenandoah, designed by the Bureau of Aeronautics and based on the Zeppelin L 49. Assembled in Hangar No. 1 and first flown on 4 September 1923 at Lakehurst, New Jersey, it was the first airship to be inflated with the noble gas helium, which was then so scarce that the Shenandoah contained most of the world's supply. A second airship, USS Los Angeles, was built by the Zeppelin company as compensation for the airships that should have been handed over as war reparations according to the terms of the Versailles Treaty but had been sabotaged by their crews. This construction order saved the Zeppelin works from the threat of closure. The success of the Los Angeles, which was flown successfully for eight years, encouraged the U.S. Navy to invest in its own, larger airships. When the Los Angeles was delivered, the two airships had to share the limited supply of helium, and thus alternated operating and overhauls.

In 1922, Sir Dennistoun Burney suggested a plan for a subsidised air service throughout the British Empire using airships (the Burney Scheme). Following the coming to power of Ramsay MacDonald's Labour government in 1924, the scheme was transformed into the Imperial Airship Scheme, under which two airships were built, one by a private company and the other by the Royal Airship Works under Air Ministry control. The two designs were radically different. The "capitalist" ship, the R100, was more conventional, while the "socialist" ship, the R101, had many innovative design features. Construction of both took longer than expected, and the airships did not fly until 1929. Neither airship was capable of the service intended, though the R100 did complete a proving flight to Canada and back in 1930. On 5 October 1930, the R101, which had not been thoroughly tested after major modifications, crashed on its maiden voyage to India at Beauvais in France, killing 48 of the 54 people aboard. Among the dead were the craft's chief designer and the Secretary of State for Air. The disaster ended British interest in airships.

In 1925 the Zeppelin company started construction of the Graf Zeppelin (LZ 127), the largest airship that could be built in the company's existing shed, and intended to stimulate interest in passenger airships. The Graf Zeppelin burned blau gas, similar to propane, stored in large gas bags below the hydrogen cells, as fuel. Since its density was similar to that of air, it avoided the weight change as fuel was used, and thus the need to valve hydrogen. The Graf Zeppelin had an impressive safety record, flying over 1,600,000 km (990,000 mi) (including the first circumnavigation of the globe by airship) without a single passenger injury.

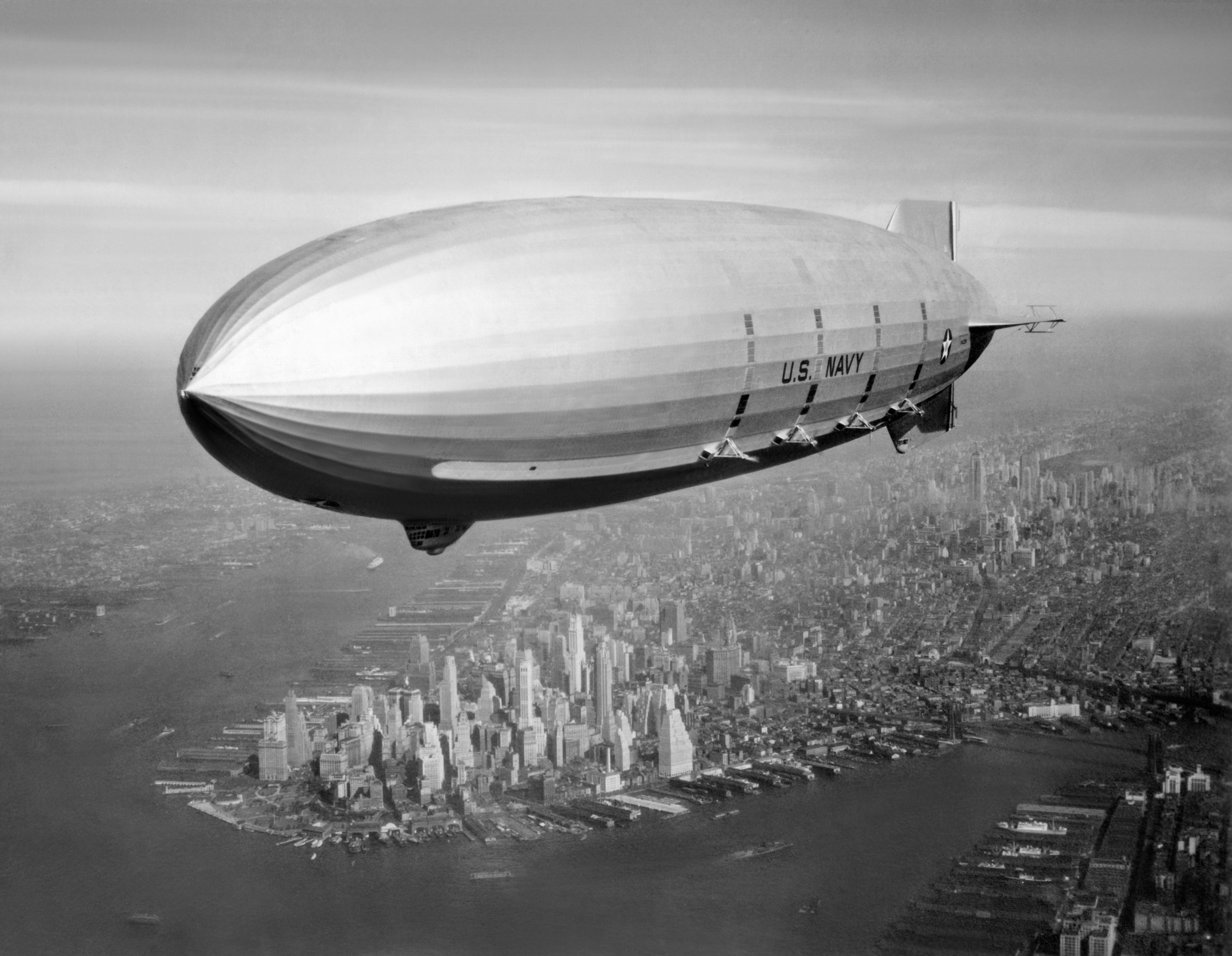
USS Macon over Lower Manhattan, 1933

The U.S. Navy experimented with using airships as airborne aircraft carriers, building on a concept pioneered by the British. The USS Los Angeles was used for initial experiments, and the USS Akron and Macon, the world's largest at the time, were used to test the principle in naval operations. Each carried four F9C Sparrowhawk fighters in its hangar, and could carry a fifth on the trapeze. The idea had mixed results. By the time the Navy began developing a sound doctrine for using the ZRS-type airships, the last of the two built, USS Macon, had been wrecked. Meanwhile, the seaplane had become more capable and was considered a better investment.

Eventually, the U.S. Navy lost all three U.S.-built rigid airships to accidents. USS Shenandoah flew into a severe thunderstorm over Noble County, Ohio while on a poorly planned publicity flight on 3 September 1925. It broke into pieces, killing 14 of its crew. USS Akron was caught in a severe storm and flown into the surface of the sea off the shore of New Jersey on 3 April 1933. It carried no lifeboats and few life vests, so 73 of its crew of 76 died from drowning or hypothermia. USS Macon was lost after suffering a structural failure offshore near Point Sur Lighthouse on 12 February 1935. The failure caused a loss of gas, which was exacerbated when the aircraft was flown over pressure height, causing it to lose too much helium to maintain flight. Only two of its crew of 83 died in the crash thanks to the inclusion of life jackets and inflatable rafts after the Akron disaster.

The Empire State Building was completed in 1931 with a dirigible mast, in anticipation of future passenger airship service, but no airship ever used the mast. Various entrepreneurs experimented with airship-based commuting and freight shipping.

In the 1930s, the German Zeppelins successfully competed with other means of transport. They could carry significantly more passengers than other contemporary aircraft while providing amenities similar to those on ocean liners, such as private cabins, observation decks, and dining rooms. Less importantly, the technology was potentially more energy-efficient than heavier-than-air designs. Zeppelins were also faster than ocean liners. On the other hand, operating airships was quite involved. Often, the crew would outnumber passengers, and on the ground, large teams were necessary to assist mooring, and very large hangars were required at airports.

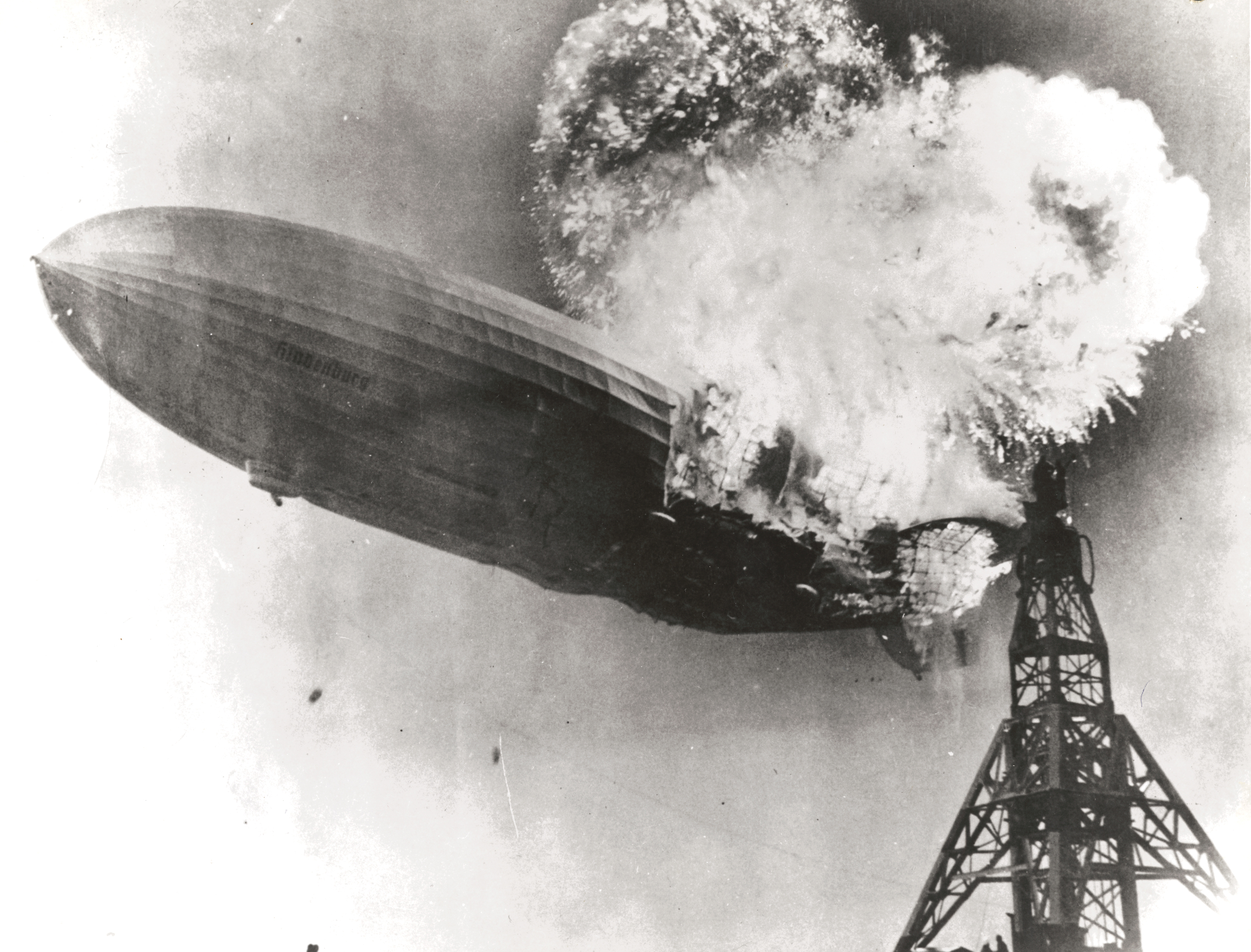
The Hindenburg explodes, 6 May 1937

By the mid-1930s, only Germany still pursued airship development. The Zeppelin company continued to operate the Graf Zeppelin on passenger service between Frankfurt and Recife in Brazil, taking 68 hours. Even with the small Graf Zeppelin, the operation was almost profitable. In the mid-1930s, work began on an airship designed specifically to operate a passenger service across the Atlantic. The Hindenburg (LZ 129) completed a successful 1936 season, carrying passengers between Lakehurst, New Jersey and Germany. The year 1937 started with the most spectacular and widely remembered airship accident. Approaching the Lakehurst mooring mast minutes before landing on 6 May 1937, the Hindenburg suddenly burst into flames and crashed to the ground. Of the 97 people aboard, 35 died: 13 passengers, 22 aircrew, along with one American ground-crewman. The disaster occurred before a large crowd and was filmed, and a radio news reporter was recording the arrival. This was a disaster that theatre goers could see and hear in newsreels. The Hindenburg disaster shattered public confidence in airships and brought a definitive end to their "golden age". The day after the Hindenburg disaster, the Graf Zeppelin landed safely in Germany after its return flight from Brazil. This was the last international passenger airship flight.

Hindenburg's identical sister ship, the Graf Zeppelin II (LZ 130), could not carry commercial passengers without helium, which the United States refused to sell to Germany. The Graf Zeppelin made several test flights and conducted electronic espionage until 1939, when it was grounded as the war began. The two Graf Zeppelin airships were scrapped in April 1940.

Development of airships continued only in the United States and, to a lesser extent, in the Soviet Union. The Soviet Union had several semi-rigid and non-rigid airships. The semi-rigid dirigible SSSR-V6 OSOAVIAKhIM was among the largest of these craft, and it set the longest endurance flight at the time of over 130 hours. It crashed into a mountain in 1938, killing 13 of the 19 people on board. Although this was a severe blow to the Soviet airship program, the Soviets continued to operate non-rigid airships until 1950.

=== World War II ===
While Germany determined that airships were obsolete for military purposes in the coming war and concentrated on developing aeroplanes, the United States pursued a program of military airship construction even though it had not developed a clear military doctrine for airship use. When the Japanese attacked Pearl Harbor on 7 December 1941, bringing the United States into World War II, the U.S. Navy had 10 nonrigid airships:

- 4 K-class: K-2, K-3, K-4 and K-5 designed as patrol ships, all built in 1938.
- 3 L-class: L-1, L-2 and L-3 as small training ships, produced in 1938.
- 1 G-class, built in 1936 for training.
- 2 TC-class that were older patrol airships designed for land forces, built in 1933. The U.S. Navy acquired both from the United States Army in 1938.

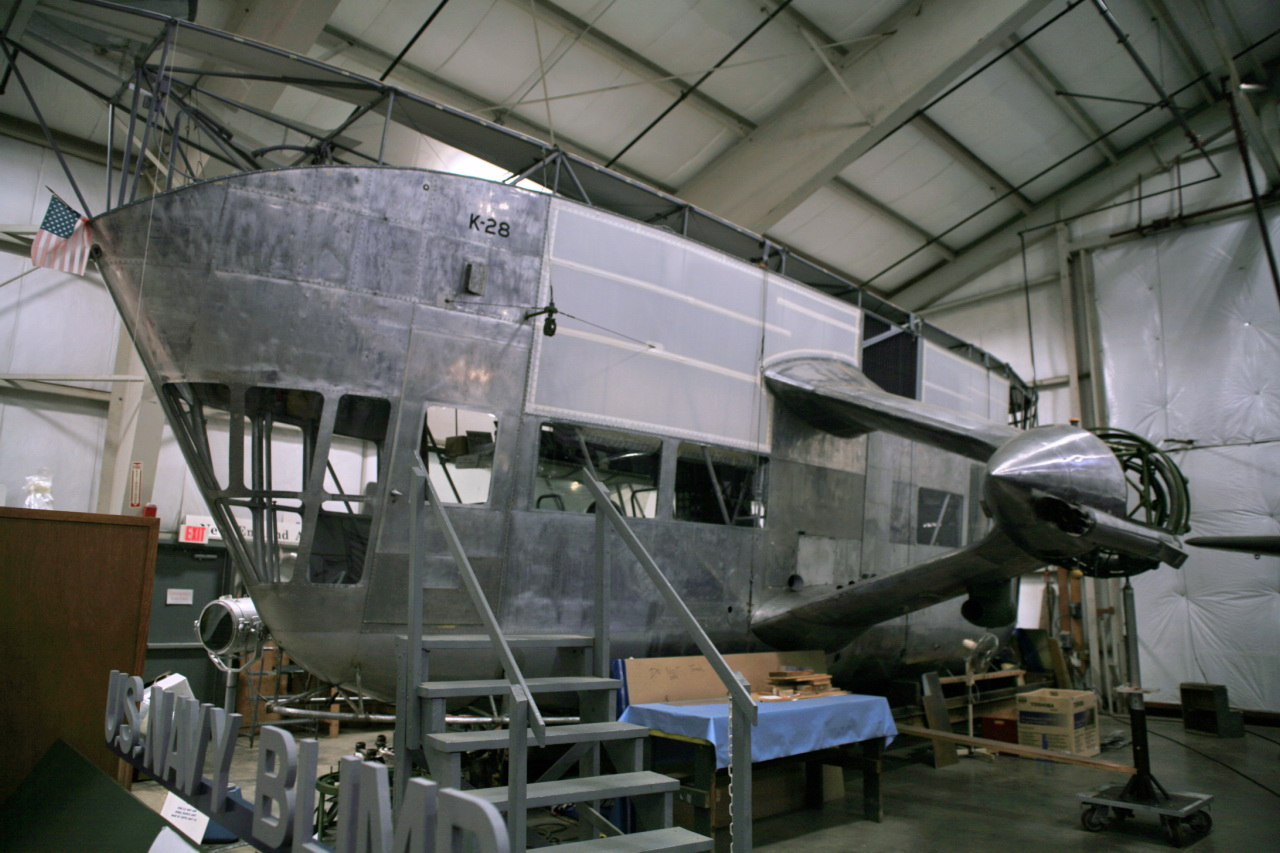
Control car (gondola) of the Goodyear ZNPK (K-28) later operated by Goodyear as Puritan VI

Only K- and TC-class airships were suitable for combat, and they were quickly pressed into service against Japanese and German submarines, which were then sinking American shipping within visual range of the American coast. U.S. Navy command, remembering airship's anti-submarine success in World War I, immediately requested new modern antisubmarine airships and on 2 January 1942 formed the ZP-12 patrol unit based in Lakehurst from the four K airships. The ZP-32 patrol unit was formed from two TC and two L airships a month later, based at NAS Moffett Field in Sunnyvale, California. An airship training base was created there as well. The status of submarine-hunting Goodyear airships in the early days of World War II has created significant confusion. Although various accounts refer to airships Resolute and Volunteer as operating as "privateers" under a Letter of Marque, Congress never authorized a commission, nor did the President sign one.

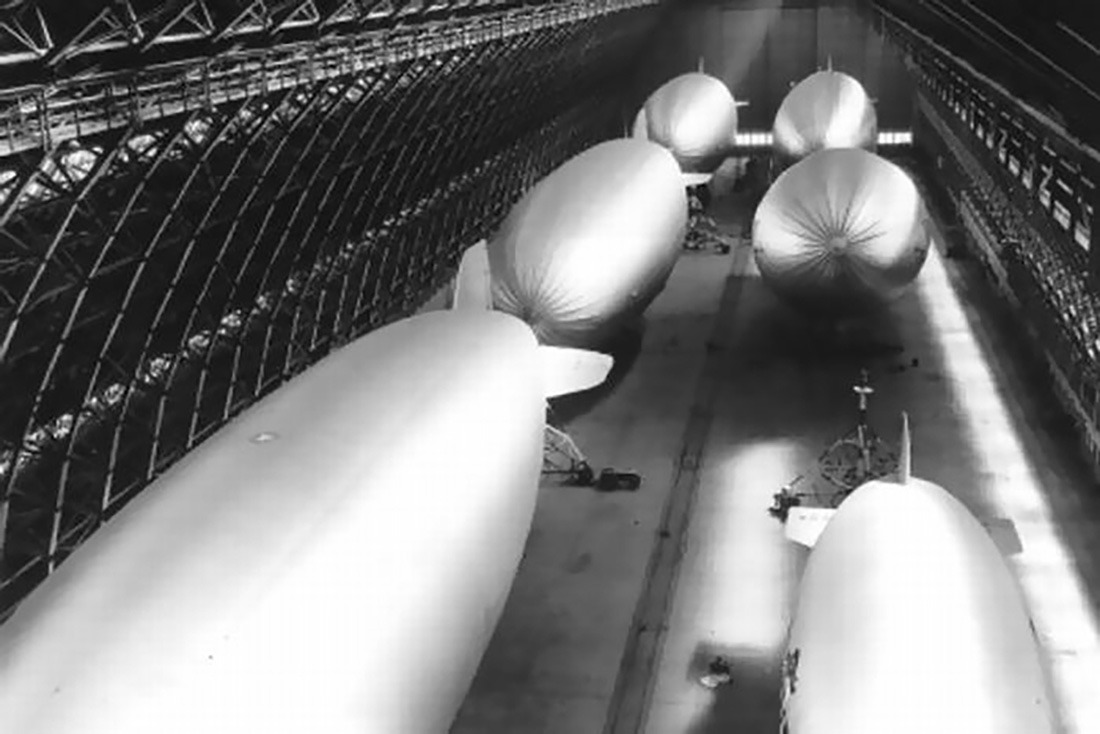
A view of six helium-filled blimps being stored in one of the two massive hangars located at NAS Santa Ana, during World War II

In 1942–44, approximately 1,400 airship pilots and 3,000 support crew members were trained in the military airship crew training program, and the number of airship military personnel grew from 430 to 12,400. The U.S. airships were produced by the Goodyear factory in Akron, Ohio. From 1942 to 1945, 154 airships were built for the U.S. Navy (133 K-class, 10 L-class, seven G-class, four M-class) and five L-class for civilian customers (serial numbers L-4 to L-8).

The primary airship tasks were patrol and convoy escort near the American coastline. They also served as an organization centre for convoys, directing ship movements, and were used in naval search-and-rescue operations. Rarer duties of the airships included aerophotography reconnaissance, naval mine-laying and mine-sweeping, parachute unit transport and deployment, and cargo and personnel transportation. They were deemed quite successful in their duties with the highest combat readiness factor in the entire U.S. Air Force (87%).

During the war, some 532 ships without airship escort were sunk near the U.S. coast by enemy submarines. Only one ship, the tanker Persephone, of the 89,000 or so in convoys escorted by blimps was sunk by the enemy. Airships engaged submarines with depth charges and, less frequently, with other on-board weapons. They were excellent at driving submarines down, where their limited speed and range prevented them from attacking convoys. The weapons available to airships were so limited that until the advent of the homing torpedo, they had little chance of sinking a submarine.

Only one airship was ever destroyed by a U-boat: on the night of 18/19 July 1943, the K-74 from ZP-21 division was patrolling the coastline near Florida. Using radar, the airship located a surfaced German submarine. The K-74 made her attack run, but the U-boat opened fire first. K-74's depth charges did not release as she crossed the U-boat, and the K-74 received serious damage, losing gas pressure and an engine, but landing in the water without loss of life. The crew was rescued by patrol boats in the morning, but one crewman, Aviation Machinist's Mate Second Class Isadore Stessel, died from a shark attack. The U-boat, submarine U-134, was slightly damaged and the next day or so was attacked by aircraft, sustaining damage that forced it to return to base. It was finally sunk on 24 August 1943 by a British Vickers Wellington near Vigo, Spain.

Fleet Airship Wing One operated from Lakehurst, New Jersey, Glynco, Georgia, Weeksville, North Carolina, South Weymouth NAS, Massachusetts, Brunswick NAS, and Bar Harbor, Maine, Yarmouth, Nova Scotia, and Argentia, Newfoundland.

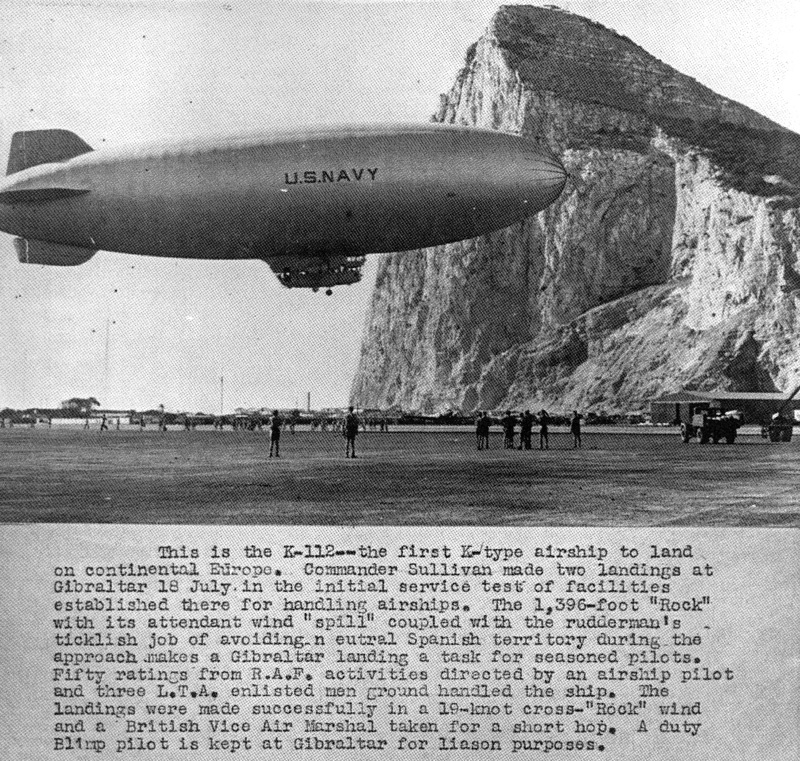
K-class blimps of USN Blimp Squadron ZP-14 conducted antisubmarine warfare operations at the Strait of Gibraltar in 1944–45.

Some Navy blimps saw action in the European theatre of war. In 1944–45, the U.S. Navy moved an entire squadron of eight Goodyear K class blimps (K-89, K-101, K-109, K-112, K-114, K-123, K-130, & K-134) with flight and maintenance crews from Weeksville Naval Air Station in North Carolina to Naval Air Station Port Lyautey, French Morocco. Their mission was to locate and destroy German U-boats in the relatively shallow waters around the Strait of Gibraltar where magnetic anomaly detection (MAD) was viable. PBY aircraft had been searching these waters, but MAD required low-altitude flying that was dangerous at night. The blimps were considered a perfect solution to establish a 24/7 MAD barrier (fence) at the Straits of Gibraltar with the PBYs flying the day shift and the blimps flying the night shift. The first two blimps (K-123 & K-130) left South Weymouth NAS on 28 May 1944 and flew to Argentia, Newfoundland, the Azores, and finally to Port Lyautey where they completed the first transatlantic crossing by nonrigid airships on 1 June 1944. The blimps of USN Blimp Squadron ZP-14 (Blimpron 14, aka The Africa Squadron) also conducted mine-spotting and mine-sweeping operations in key Mediterranean ports and various escorts, including the convoy carrying United States President Franklin D. Roosevelt and British Prime Minister Winston Churchill to the Yalta Conference in 1945. Airships from the ZP-12 unit took part in the sinking of the last U-boat before German capitulation, sinking the U-881 on 6 May 1945 together with destroyers USS Atherton and USS Moberly.

Other airships patrolled the Caribbean, Fleet Airship Wing Two, Headquartered at Naval Air Station Richmond, covered the Gulf of Mexico from Richmond and Key West, Florida, Houma, Louisiana, as well as Hitchcock and Brownsville, Texas. FAW 2 also patrolled the northern Caribbean from San Julian, the Isle of Pines (now called Isla de la Juventud) and Guantánamo Bay, Cuba, as well as Vernam Field, Jamaica.

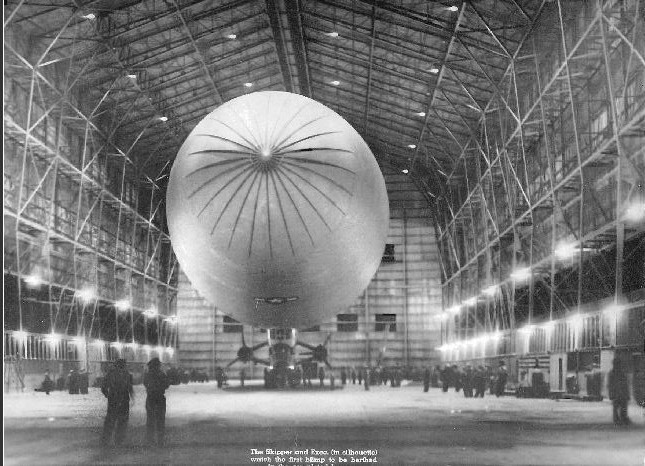
Interior view of Carlsen Field's LTA hangar built by African American Seabees of the 80th Naval Construction in 1943

Navy blimps of Fleet Airship Wing Five (ZP-51) operated from bases in Trinidad, British Guiana and Paramaribo, Suriname. Fleet Airship Wing Four operated along the coast of Brazil. Two squadrons, VP-41 and VP-42 flew from bases at Amapá, Igarapé-Açu, São Luís Fortaleza, Fernando de Noronha, Recife, Maceió, Ipitanga (near Salvador, Bahia), Caravelas, Vitória and the hangar built for the Graf Zeppelin at Santa Cruz, Rio de Janeiro.

Fleet Airship Wing Three operated squadrons, ZP-32 from Moffett Field, ZP-31 at NAS Santa Ana, and ZP-33 at NAS Tillamook, Oregon. Auxiliary fields were at Del Mar, Lompoc, Watsonville and Eureka, California, North Bend and Astoria, Oregon, as well as Shelton and Quillayute in Washington.

From 2 January 1942 until the end of war airship operations in the Atlantic, the blimps of the Atlantic fleet made 37,554 flights and flew 378,237 hours. Of the over 70,000 ships in convoys protected by blimps, only one was sunk by a submarine while under blimp escort.

The Soviet Union flew a single airship during the war. The USSR-V1 (also known as the SSSR-V1 or the CCCP-B1) was originally built in 1932. and rebuilt in 1942 as the USSR-V12. The V12 entered service in 1942 for hydrogen delivery, paratrooper training, and equipment transport. It made 1432 flights with 300 metric tons of cargo until 1945. In 1947, the V12 crashed into the shed doors, catching fire. It was rebuilt and re-commissioned, as the USSR-V12bis Patriot, in the same year.

On 1 February 1945, the Soviets commissioned a second airship, Pobyeda (Victory). The Pobyeda was used for mine-sweeping and wreckage clearing in the Black Sea, crashing on 29 January 1947.

=== Postwar period ===
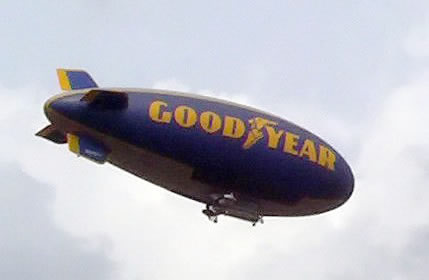
One of the Goodyear Tire and Rubber Company's blimp fleet, being replaced by Zeppelin NT semirigids

Although airships are no longer used for major cargo and passenger transport, they are still used for other purposes such as advertising, sightseeing, surveillance, research, and advocacy.

There were several studies and proposals for nuclear-powered airships, starting with a 1954 study by F.W. Locke Jr for the US Navy. In 1957, Edwin J. Kirschner published the book The Zeppelin in the Atomic Age, which promoted the use of atomic airships. In 1959, Goodyear presented a plan for a nuclear-powered airship for both military and commercial use. Several other proposals and papers were published during the next decades.

In the 1980s, Per Lindstrand and his team introduced the GA-42 airship, the first airship to use fly-by-wire flight control, which considerably reduced the pilot's workload.

An airship was prominently featured in the James Bond film A View to a Kill, released in 1985. The Skyship 500 had the livery of Zorin Industries.

The world's largest thermal airship (300,000 cubic feet; 8,500 cubic metres) was constructed by the Per Lindstrand company for French botanists in 1993. The AS-300 carried an underslung raft, which the airship positioned atop tree canopies in the rain forest, allowing the botanists to conduct their treetop research without causing significant damage to the rainforest. When research was finished at a given location, the airship returned to pick up and relocate the raft.

In June 1987, the U.S. Navy awarded a US$168.9 million contract to Westinghouse Electric and Airship Industries of the UK to find out whether an airship could be used as an airborne platform to detect the threat of sea-skimming missiles, such as the Exocet. At 2.5 million cubic feet, the Westinghouse/Airship Industries Sentinel 5000 (Redesignated YEZ-2A by the U.S. Navy) prototype design was to have been the largest blimp ever constructed. Additional funding for the Naval Airship Program was killed in 1995 and development was discontinued.

The SVAM CA-80 airship, produced in 2000 by Shanghai Vantage Airship Manufacture Co., Ltd., conducted a successful trial flight in September 2001. This was designed for advertisement and propagation, air photography, scientific testing, tours, and surveillance duties. It was certified as a grade-A Hi-Tech introduction program (No. 20000186) in Shanghai. The CAAC granted type design approval and a certificate of airworthiness for the airship.

In the 1990s, the Zeppelin company returned to the airship business. Their new model, designated the Zeppelin NT, made its maiden flight on 18 September 1997. As of 2009 there were four NT aircraft flying; a fifth was completed in March 2009, and an expanded NT-14 (14,000 cubic meters of helium, capable of carrying 19 passengers) was under construction. One was sold to a Japanese company, and was planned to be flown to Japan in the summer of 2004. Due to delays getting permission from the Russian government, the company decided to transport the airship to Japan by sea. One of the four NT craft is in South Africa carrying diamond detection equipment from De Beers, an application at which the very stable, low-vibration NT platform excels. The project included design adaptations for high-temperature operation and desert climates, as well as a separate mooring mast and a very heavy mooring truck. NT-4 belonged to Airship Ventures of Moffett Field in Mountain View, San Francisco Bay Area, and provided sightseeing tours.

Blimps are used for advertising and as TV camera platforms at major sporting events. The most iconic of these are the Goodyear Blimps. Goodyear operates three blimps in the United States, and The Lightship Group, now The AirSign Airship Group, operates up to 19 advertising blimps around the world. Airship Management Services owns and operates three Skyship 600 blimps. Two operate as advertising and security ships in North America and the Caribbean. Airship Ventures operated a Zeppelin NT for advertising, passenger service, and special mission projects. They were the only airship operator in the U.S. authorized to fly commercial passengers until they closed their doors in 2012.

Skycruise Switzerland AG owns and operates two Skyship 600 blimps. One operates regularly over Switzerland and is used on sightseeing tours.

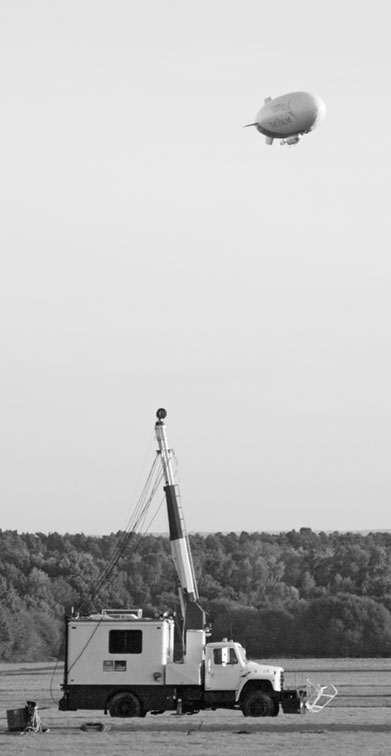
The Spirit of Dubai approaches its motorized mooring mast

The Switzerland-based Skyship 600 has also played other roles over the years. For example, it was flown over Athens during the 2004 Summer Olympics as a security measure. In November 2006, it carried advertising calling it The Spirit of Dubai as it began a publicity tour from London to Dubai, UAE on behalf of The Palm Islands, the world's largest artificial islands created as a residential complex.

Los Angeles-based Worldwide Aeros Corp. produces FAA Type Certified Aeros 40D Sky Dragon airships.

In May 2006, the U.S. Navy began to fly airships again after a hiatus of nearly 44 years. The program uses a single American Blimp Company A-170 nonrigid airship, with designation MZ-3A. Operations focus on crew training and research, and the platform integrator is Northrop Grumman. The program is directed by the Naval Air Systems Command and is being carried out at NAES Lakehurst, the original centre of U.S. Navy lighter-than-air operations in previous decades.

In November 2006, the U.S. Army bought an A380+ airship from American Blimp Corporation through a systems-level contract with Northrop Grumman and Booz Allen Hamilton. The airship started flight tests in late 2007, with a primary goal of carrying 2,500 lb (1,100 kg) of payload to an altitude of 15,000 ft (4,600 m) under remote control and autonomous waypoint navigation. The program will also demonstrate carrying 1,000 lb (450 kg) of payload to 20,000 ft (6,100 m) The platform could be used for intelligence collection. In 2008, the CA-150 airship was launched by Vantage Airship. This is an improved version of the model CA-120, and was completed in 2008. With larger volume and increased passenger capacity, it is the largest manned nonrigid airship in China at present.

In late June 2014 the Electronic Frontier Foundation flew the GEFA-FLUG AS 105 GD/4 blimp AE Bates (owned by, and in conjunction with, Greenpeace) over the NSA's Bluffdale Utah Data Center in protest.

==== Postwar projects ====
Hybrid designs such as the Heli-Stat airship/helicopter, the Aereon aerostatic/aerodynamic craft, and the CycloCrane (a hybrid aerostatic/rotorcraft) struggled to take flight. The Cyclocrane was also interesting because the airship's envelope rotated about its longitudinal axis.

In 2005, a short-lived project of the U.S. Defense Advanced Research Projects Agency (DARPA) was Walrus HULA, which explored the potential of using airships as long-distance, heavy-lift craft. The primary goal of the research program was to determine the feasibility of building an airship capable of carrying 500 short tons (450 t) of payload a distance of 12,000 mi (19,000 km) and land on an unimproved location without the use of external ballast or ground equipment (such as masts). In 2005, two contractors, Lockheed Martin and US Aeros Airships, were each awarded approximately $3 million to conduct feasibility studies on WALRUS designs. Congress removed funding for Walrus HULA in 2006.

== Modern airships ==
=== Military ===
In 2010, the U.S. Army awarded a $517 million (£350.6 million) contract to Northrop Grumman and partner Hybrid Air Vehicles to develop a Long Endurance Multi-Intelligence Vehicle (LEMV) system consisting of three HAV 304s. The project was cancelled in February 2012 due to it being behind schedule and over budget; also the forthcoming U.S. withdrawal from Afghanistan where it was intended to be deployed. Following this the Hybrid Air Vehicles HAV 304 Airlander 10 was repurchased by Hybrid Air Vehicles then modified and reassembled in Bedford, UK, and renamed the Airlander 10. As of 2018, it was being tested in readiness for its UK flight test programme.

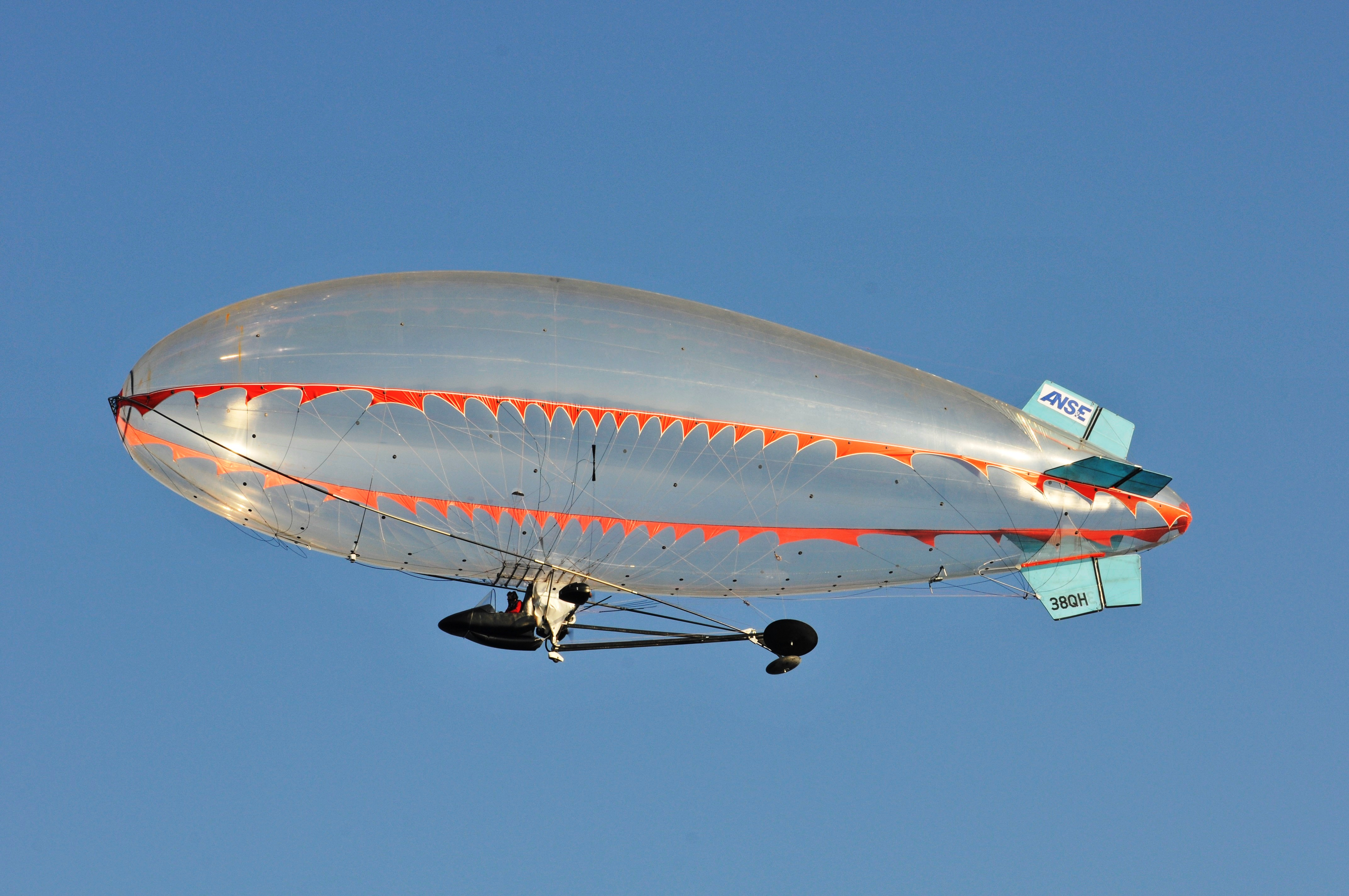
A-N400 (A-NSE company)

A-NSE, a French company, manufactures and operates airships and aerostats. For 2 years, A-NSE has been testing its airships for the French Army. Airships and aerostats are operated to provide intelligence, surveillance, and reconnaissance (ISR) support. Their airships include many innovative features, such as water-ballast take-off and landing systems, variable-geometry envelopes, and thrust–vectoring systems.

The U.S. government has funded two major projects in the high altitude arena. The Composite Hull High Altitude Powered Platform (CHHAPP) is sponsored by U.S. Army Space and Missile Defense Command. This aircraft is also sometimes called the HiSentinel High-Altitude Airship. This prototype ship made a five-hour test flight in September 2005. The second project, the high-altitude airship (HAA), is sponsored by DARPA. In 2005, DARPA awarded a contract worth nearly $150 million to Lockheed Martin for prototype development. The first flight of the HAA was planned for 2008 but was delayed due to programmatic and funding issues. The HAA project evolved into the High Altitude Long Endurance-Demonstrator (HALE-D). The U.S. Army and Lockheed Martin launched the first-of-its-kind HALE-D on July 27, 2011. After attaining an altitude of 32,000 ft (9,800 m), due to an anomaly, the company decided to abort the mission. The airship made a controlled descent in an unpopulated area of southwest Pennsylvania.

On 31 January 2006, Lockheed Martin made the first flight of their secretly built hybrid airship designated the P-791. The design is very similar to the SkyCat, unsuccessfully promoted for many years by the British company Advanced Technologies Group (ATG).

Dirigibles have been used in the War in Afghanistan for reconnaissance purposes, as they enable constant monitoring of a specific area via cameras mounted on the airships.

=== Passenger transport ===
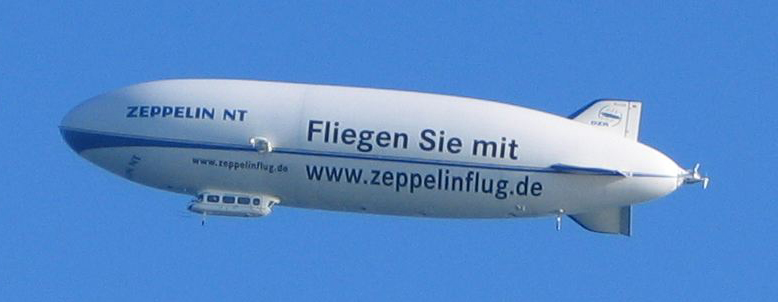
A Zeppelin NT airship

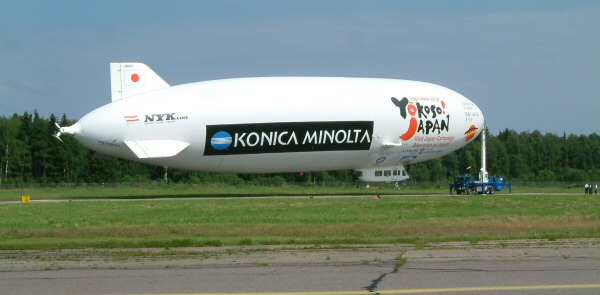
Yokoso! Japan passenger airship at the Malmi Airport in Helsinki, Finland

In the 1990s, the successor to the original Zeppelin company in Friedrichshafen, the Zeppelin Luftschifftechnik GmbH, resumed airship construction. The first experimental craft (later christened Friedrichshafen) of the type "Zeppelin NT" flew in September 1997. Though larger than common blimps, the Neue Technologie (New Technology) zeppelins are much smaller than their giant ancestors and not actually Zeppelin-types in the classical sense. They are sophisticated semirigids. Apart from the greater payload, their main advantages compared to blimps are higher speed and excellent maneuverability. Meanwhile, several Zeppelin NT have been produced and operated profitably in joyrides, research flights, and similar applications.

In June 2004, a Zeppelin NT was sold for the first time to a Japanese company, Nippon Airship Corporation, for tourism and advertising mainly around Tokyo. It was also given a role at the 2005 Expo in Aichi. The aircraft began a flight from Friedrichshafen to Japan, stopping at Geneva, Paris, Rotterdam, Munich, Berlin, Stockholm, and other European cities to carry passengers on short legs of the flight. Russian authorities denied overflight permission, so the airship had to be dismantled and shipped to Japan rather than following the historic Graf Zeppelin flight from Germany to Japan.

In 2008, Airship Ventures Inc. began operations from Moffett Federal Airfield near Mountain View, California and, until November 2012, offered tours of the San Francisco Bay Area for up to 12 passengers.

=== Exploration ===
In November 2005, De Beers, a diamond mining company, launched an airship exploration program over the remote Kalahari Desert. A Zeppelin NT, equipped with a Bell Geospace gravity gradiometer, was used to find potential diamond mines by scanning the local geography for low-density rock formations, known as kimberlite pipes. On 21 September 2007, the airship was severely damaged by a whirlwind while in Botswana. One crew member, who was on watch aboard the moored craft, was slightly injured but released after overnight observation in the hospital.

=== Thermal ===
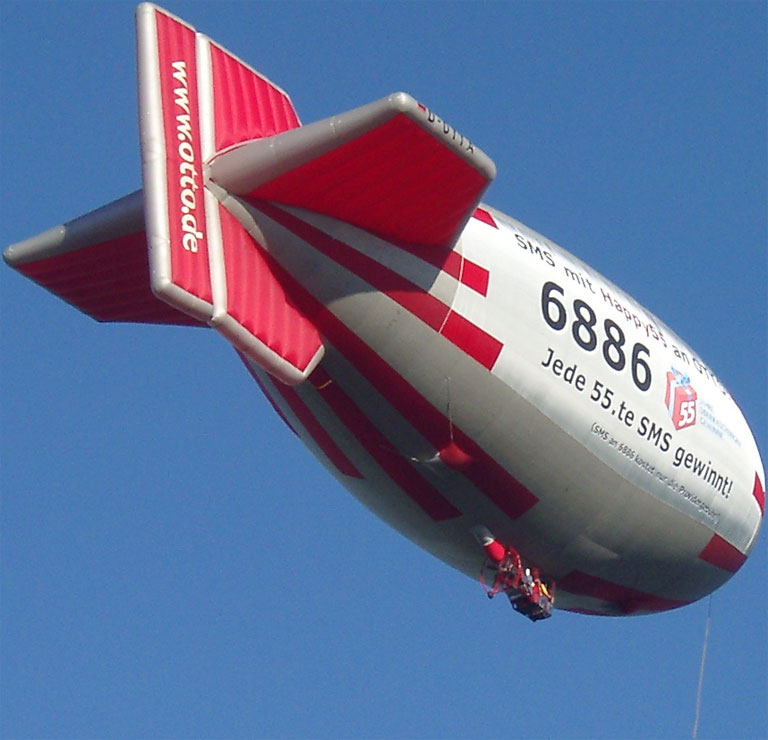
Thermal airship (manufacturer GEFA-FLUG/Germany)

Several companies, such as Cameron Balloons in Bristol, United Kingdom, build hot-air airships. These combine the structures of both hot-air balloons and small airships. The envelope is the normal cigar shape, complete with tail fins, but is inflated with hot air instead of helium to provide the lifting force. A small gondola, carrying the pilot and passengers, a small engine, and the burners to provide the hot air, is suspended below the envelope, beneath an opening through which the burners protrude.

Hot-air airships typically cost less to buy and maintain than modern helium-based blimps, and can be quickly deflated after flights. This makes them easy to carry in trailers or trucks and inexpensive to store. They are usually very slow-moving, with a typical top speed of 25–30 km/h (16–19 mph; 6.9–8.3 m/s). They are mainly used for advertising, but at least one has been used in rainforests for wildlife observation, as they can be easily transported to remote areas.

=== Unmanned remote ===
Remote-controlled (RC) airships, a type of unmanned aerial system (UAS), are sometimes used for commercial purposes, such as advertising and aerial video and photography, as well as for recreational purposes. They are particularly common as an advertising mechanism at indoor stadiums. While RC airships are sometimes flown outdoors, doing so for commercial purposes is illegal in the US. Commercial use of an uncrewed airship must be certified under part 121.

=== Adventures ===
In 2008, French adventurer Stéphane Rousson attempted to cross the English Channel with a muscular pedal-powered airship.

Stephane Rousson also flies the Aérosail, a sky sailing yacht [Fr].

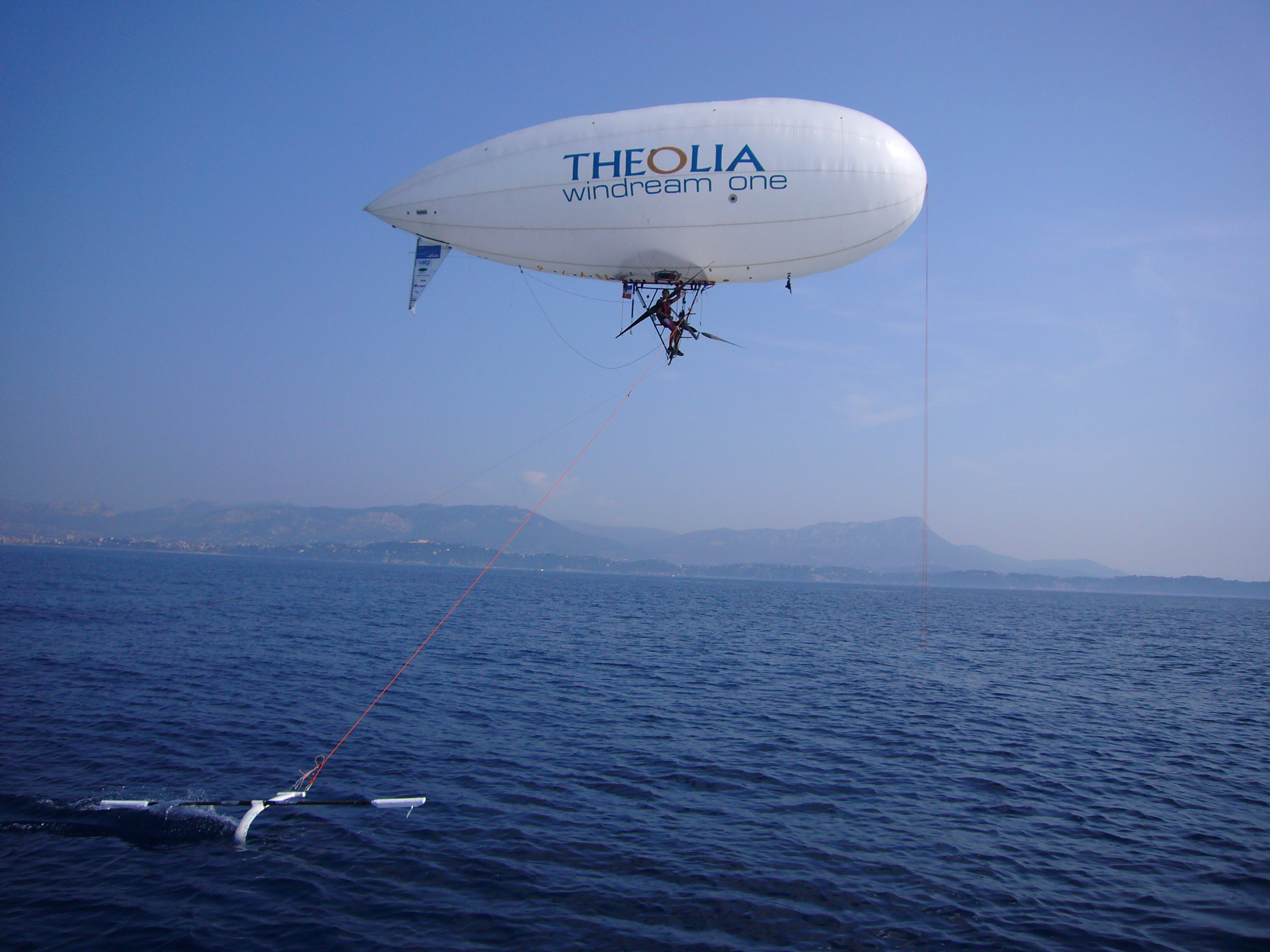
Aerosail

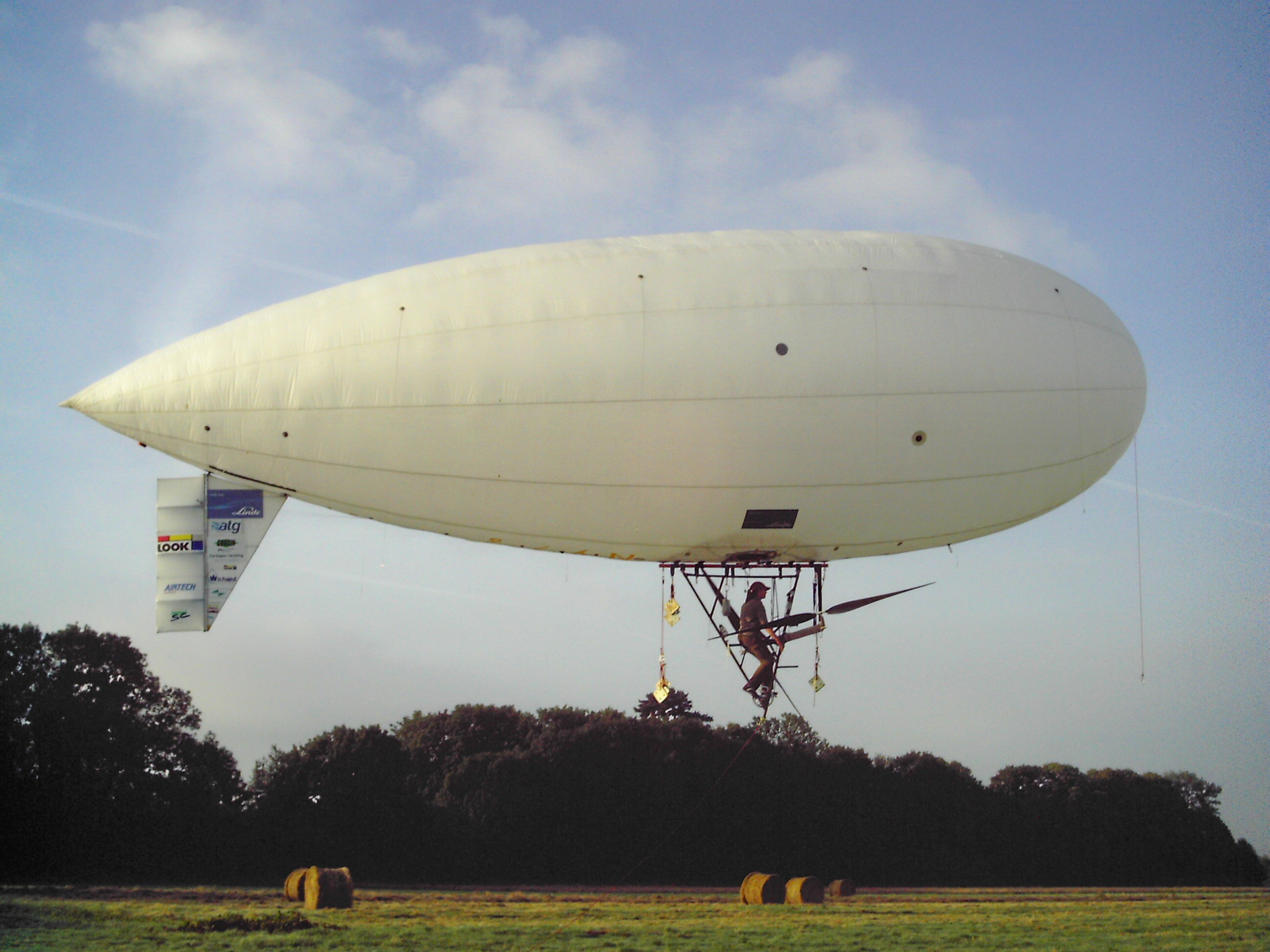
Mlle Louise pedal Airship by Stephane Rousson

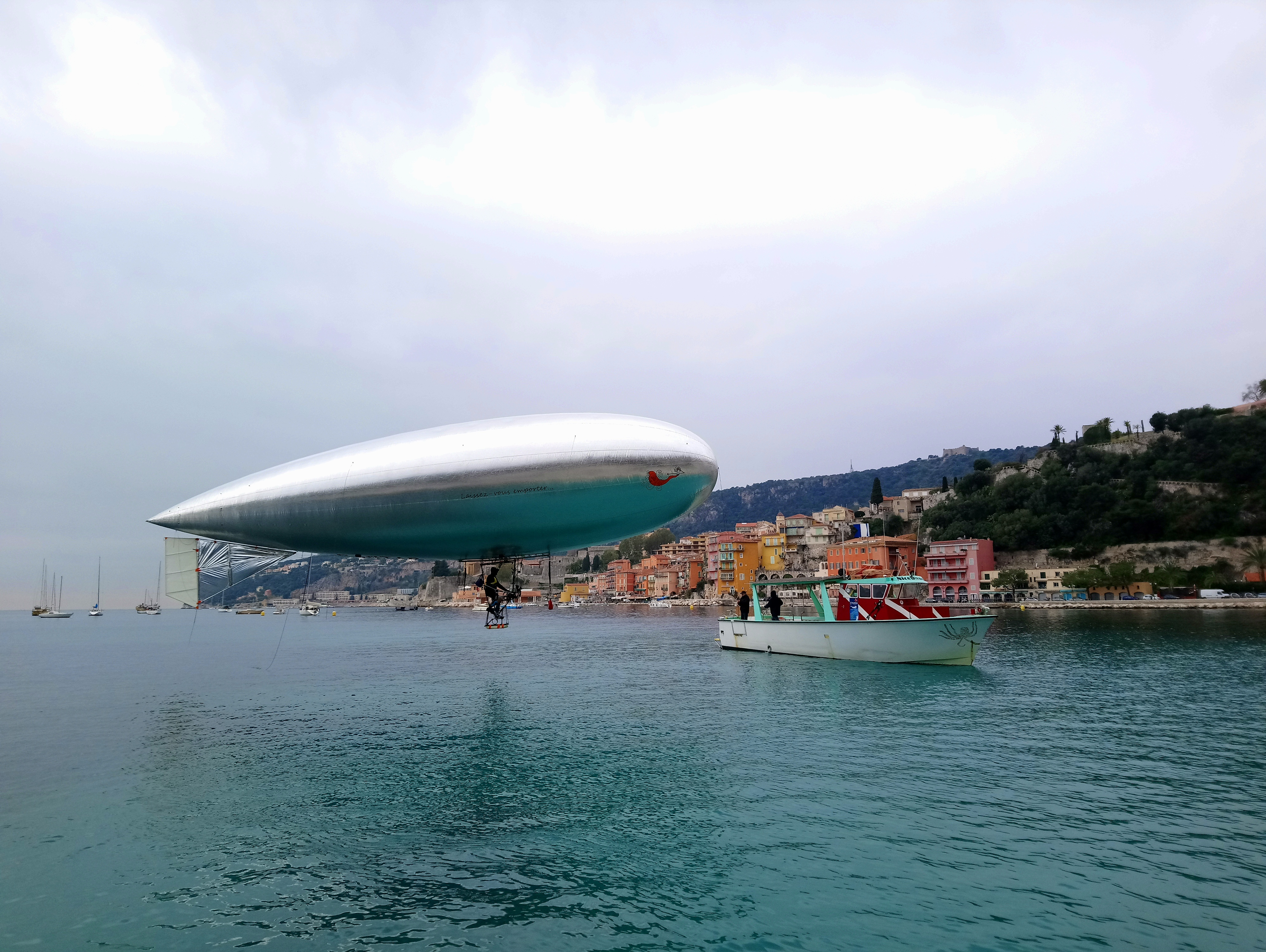
Zeppy 3 by Stephane Rousson

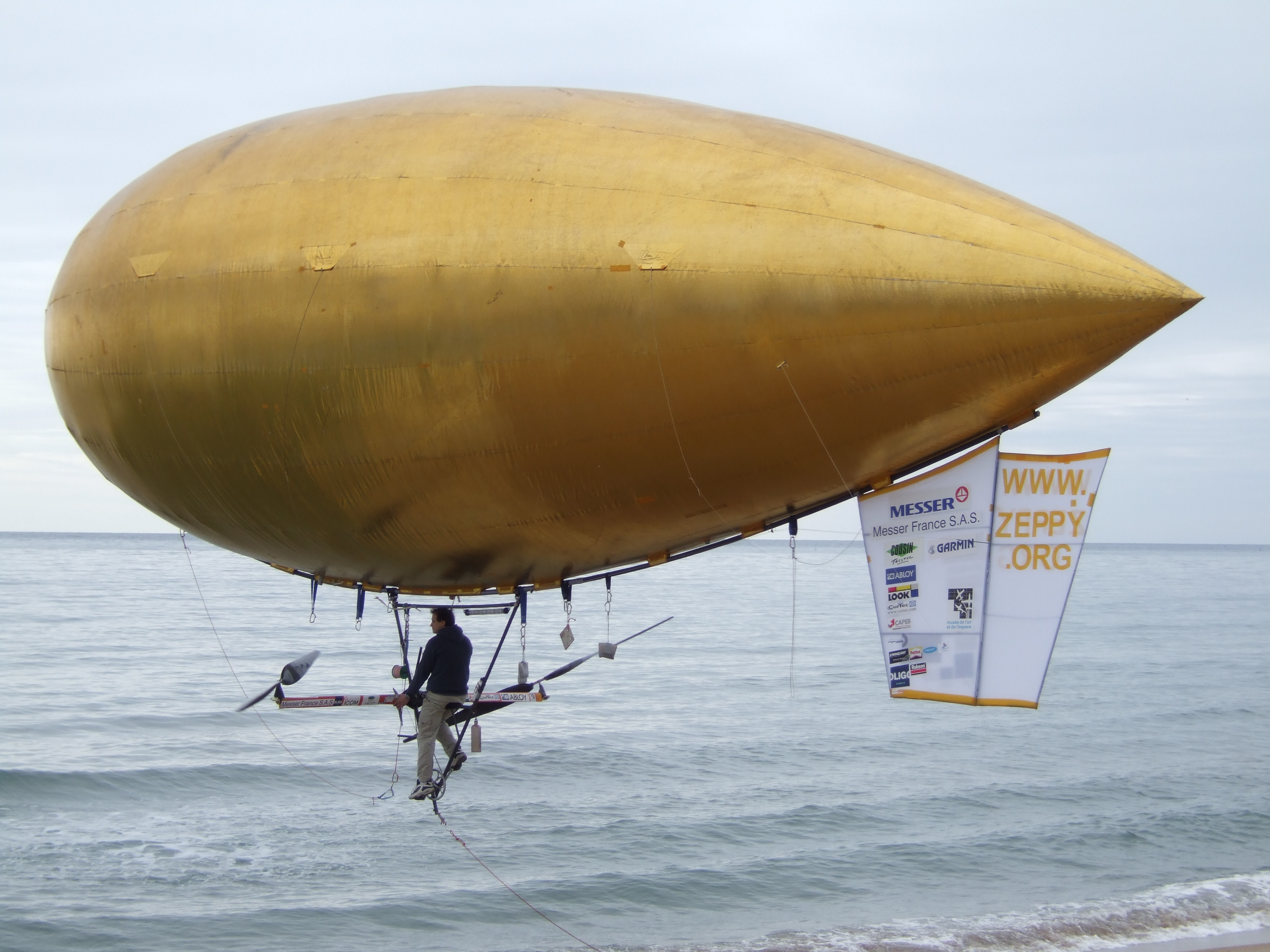
Zeppy One

== Current design projects ==
The largest airship, the LZ 129 Hindenburg at 245 meters length and 41 meters diameter, dwarfs the size of the largest historic and modern passenger and cargo aeroplanes.

Today, with large, fast, and more cost-efficient fixed-wing aircraft and helicopters, it is unknown whether huge airships can operate profitably in regular passenger transport. However, as energy costs rise, attention is once again returning to these lighter-than-air vessels as a possible alternative. At the very least, the idea of comparatively slow, "majestic" cruising at relatively low altitudes and in a comfortable atmosphere certainly has retained some appeal. There have been some niches for airships in and after World War II, such as long-duration observations, antisubmarine patrol, platforms for TV camera crews, and advertising; these generally require only small and flexible craft, and have thus generally been better fitted for cheaper (non-passenger) blimps.

=== Heavy lifting and buoyancy compensation ===
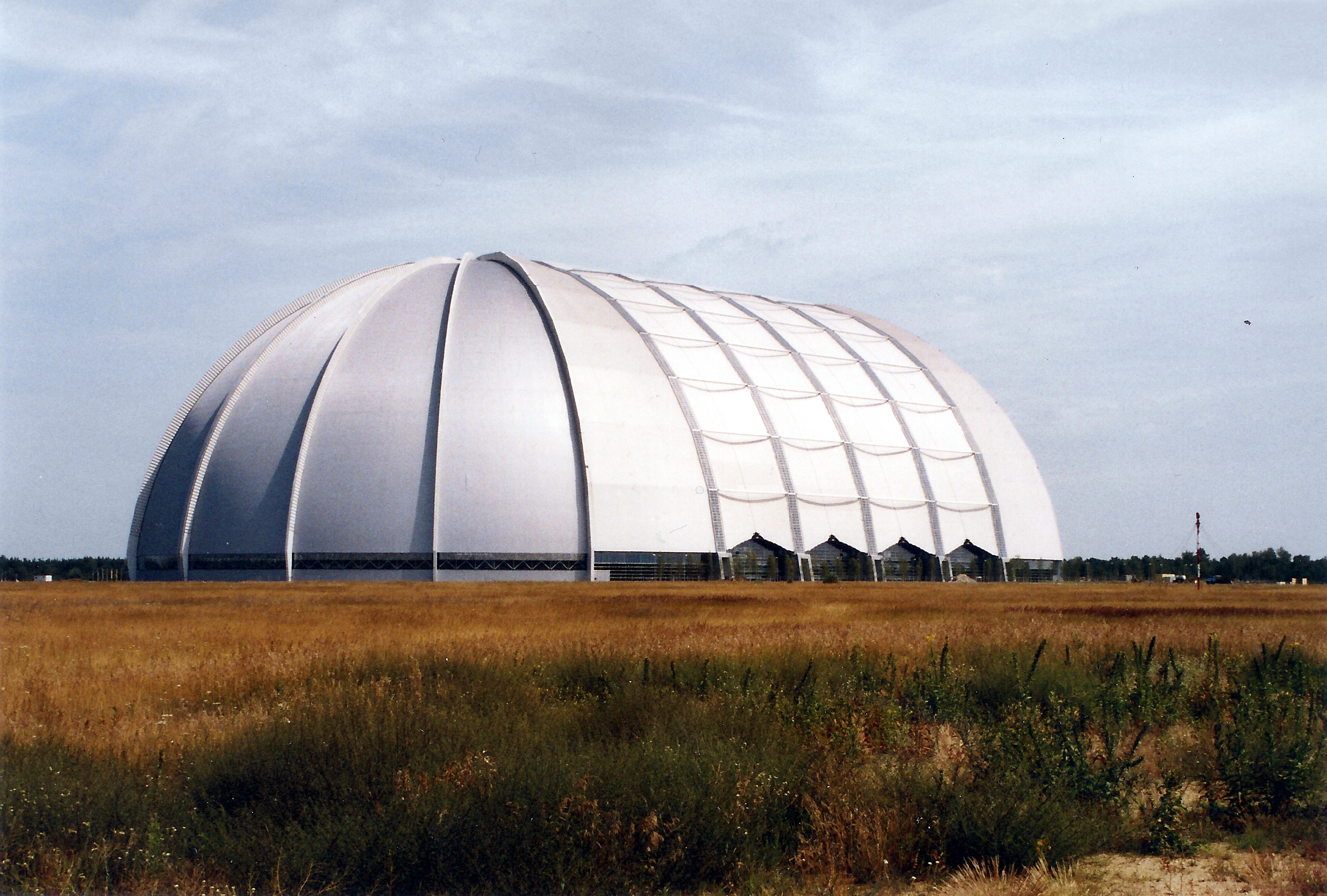
CargoLifter hangar near Berlin, since 2004 used as Tropical Islands resort

It has periodically been suggested that airships could be employed for cargo transport, especially for delivering extremely heavy loads over great distances to areas with poor infrastructure. This has also been called roadless trucking. Also, airships could be used for heavy lifting over short distances (e.g., on construction sites); this is described as heavy-lift, short-haul. In both cases, the airships would be heavy haulers.

The old Zeppelins already faced the challenge of maintaining buoyancy when large amounts of fuel were burnt on long, often intercontinental, trips. Letting go lifting gas would be an expensive option. Another idea was to pick up water as ballast from the sea or from exhaust fumes. A third was using a kind of lift gas that could be burnt, like Blau gas, as a Buoyancy compensator. The matter is even worse when heavy freight is delivered.

One recent (1996 to 2002) enterprise of this sort was the German Cargolifter project, in which a hybrid (thus not entirely Zeppelin-type) airship, even larger than Hindenburg, was proposed. Around 2000, CargoLifter AG built the world's largest self-supporting hall, measuring 360 m (1,180 ft) long, 210 m (690 ft) wide and 107 m (351 ft) high about 60 km (37 mi) south of Berlin. In May 2002, the project was stopped for financial reasons; the company had to file bankruptcy. The enormous CargoLifter hangar was later converted to house the Tropical Islands Resort. Cargolifter had intended to replace its cargo upon delivery with water-filled containers of the same weight.

Although no rigid airships are currently used for heavy lifting, hybrid airships are being developed for such purposes. AEREON 26, tested in 1971, was described in John McPhee's The Deltoid Pumpkin Seed. Flying Whales is a French aeronautic start-up developing an airship for transporting heavy loads.

An impediment to the large-scale development of airships as heavy haulers has been determining how to use them cost-efficiently. To have a significant economic advantage over ocean transport, cargo airships must deliver their payload faster than ocean carriers but more cheaply than airplanes. William Crowder, a fellow at the Logistics Management Institute, has calculated that cargo airships are only economical when they can transport 500 to 1,000 tons, approximately the same as a super-jumbo aircraft. The large initial investment required to build such a large airship has been a hindrance to production, especially given the risk inherent in a new technology. The chief commercial officer of the company, hoping to sell the LMH-1, a cargo airship developed by Lockheed Martin, believes that airships can be economical in hard-to-reach locations such as mining operations in northern Canada that currently require ice roads.

=== Metal-clad airships ===
A metal-clad airship has a very thin metal envelope, rather than the usual fabric. The shell may be either internally braced or monocoque as in the ZMC-2, which flew many times in the 1920s, the only example ever to do so. The shell may be gas-tight, as in a non-rigid blimp, or the design may employ internal gas bags, as in a rigid airship. Compared to a fabric envelope, the metal cladding is expected to be more durable.

=== Hybrid airships ===
A Hybrid airship is an aircraft that combines characteristics of heavier-than-air (aeroplane or helicopter) and lighter-than-air technology. Examples include helicopter-airship hybrids intended for heavy-lift applications and dynamic-lift airships intended for long-range cruising. Most airships, when fully loaded with cargo and fuel, are ballasted to be heavier than air and thus must rely on their propulsion system and shape to generate the aerodynamic lift needed to stay aloft. All airships can be operated to be slightly heavier than air at periods during flight (descent). Accordingly, the term "hybrid airship" refers to a craft that obtains a significant portion of its lift from aerodynamic lift or other kinetic means.

For example, the Aeroscraft is a buoyancy-assisted air vehicle that generates lift through a combination of aerodynamics, thrust vectoring, and gas buoyancy generation and management, and will, for much of the time, fly heavier-than-air. Aeroscraft is Worldwide Aeros Corporation's continuation of DARPA's now cancelled Walrus HULA (Hybrid Ultra Large Aircraft) project.

The Patroller P3 hybrid airship developed by Advanced Hybrid Aircraft Ltd, BC, Canada, is a relatively small (85,000 ft^{3} / 2,400 m^{3}) buoyant craft, manned by the crew of five and with the endurance of up to 72 hours. The flight tests with the 40% RC scale model proved that such a craft can be launched and landed without a large team of strong ground-handlers. Design features a special "winglet" for aerodynamic lift control.

=== Airships in space exploration ===
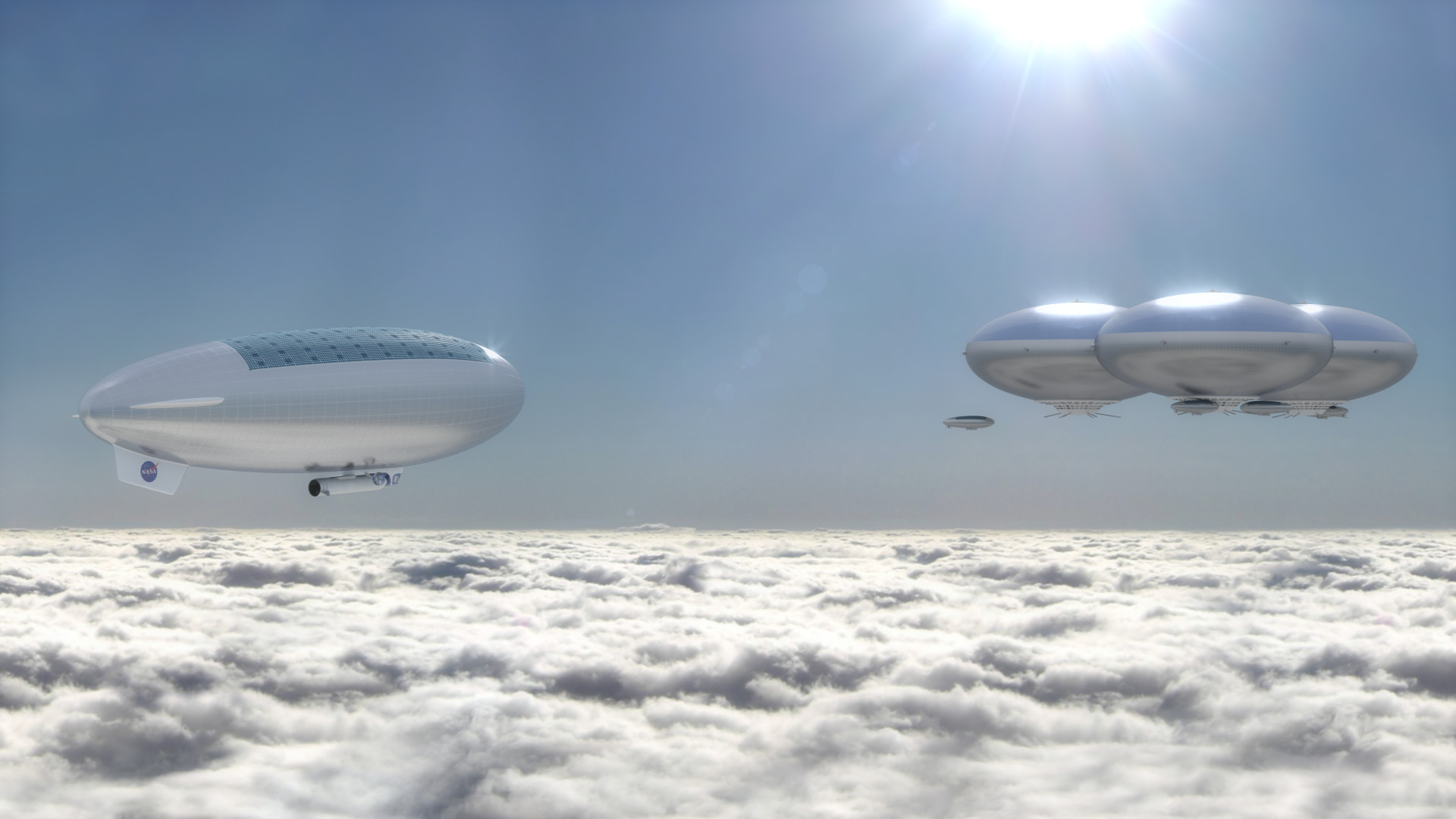
Artist's rendering of a NASA crewed floating outpost in the atmosphere of Venus

Airships have been proposed as a potential, cheap alternative to surface rocket launches for achieving Earth orbit. JP Aerospace have proposed the Airship to Orbit project, which intends to float a multi-stage airship up to mesospheric altitudes of 55 km (180,000 ft) and then use ion propulsion to accelerate to orbital speed. At these heights, air resistance would not be a significant problem for achieving such speeds. The company has not yet built any of the three stages.

NASA has proposed the High Altitude Venus Operational Concept, which comprises a series of five missions including crewed missions to the atmosphere of Venus in airships. Pressures on the surface of the planet are too high for human habitation, but at a specific altitude the pressure is equal to that found on Earth and this makes Venus a potential target for human colonization.

Hypothetically, there could be an airship lifted by a vacuum—that is, by material that can contain nothing at all inside but withstand the atmospheric pressure from the outside. It is, at this point, science fiction, although NASA has posited that a vacuum airship could eventually be used to explore the surface of Mars.

=== Cruiser feeder transport airship ===
EU FP7 MAAT Project has studied an innovative cruiser/feeder airship system, for the stratosphere with a cruiser remaining airborne for a long time and feeders connecting it to the ground and flying as piloted balloons.

=== Airships for humanitarian and cargo transport ===
Google co-founder Sergey Brin founded LTA Research in 2015 to develop airships for humanitarian and cargo transport. The company's 124-meter-long airship Pathfinder 1 received a special airworthiness certificate from the FAA for the helium-filled airship in September 2023.

The certificate allowed the largest airship since the ill-fated Hindenburg to begin flight tests at Moffett Field, a joint civil-military airport in Silicon Valley. The Pathfinder is deemed the largest flying aircraft in size, beating that of the Stratolaunch Roc and many more.

== Comparison with heavier-than-air aircraft ==
The advantage of airships over aeroplanes is that static lift sufficient for flight is generated by the lifting gas and requires no engine power. This was an immense advantage before the middle of World War I and remained an advantage for long-distance or long-duration operations until World War II. Modern concepts for high-altitude airships include photovoltaic cells to reduce the need to land for refuelling, allowing them to remain airborne until their consumables expire. This similarly reduces or eliminates the need to consider variable fuel weight in buoyancy calculations.

The disadvantages are that an airship has a very large reference area and a comparatively large drag coefficient, resulting in a larger drag force than aeroplanes and even helicopters. Given the large frontal area and wetted surface of an airship, a practical limit is reached around 130–160 kilometres per hour (80–100 mph), only about one-third the typical airspeed of a modern commercial airplane. Thus, airships are used where speed is not critical.

The lift capability of an airship is equal to the buoyant force minus the weight of the airship. This assumes standard air-temperature and pressure conditions. Corrections are usually made for water vapour and impurities in the lifting gas, as well as for the gas-cell inflation percentage at liftoff. Based on specific lift (lifting force per unit volume of gas), the greatest static lift is provided by hydrogen (11.15 N/m^{3} or 71 lb_{f}/1000 cu ft) with helium (10.37 N/m^{3} or 66 lb_{f}/1000 cu ft) a close second.

In addition to static lift, an airship can obtain a certain amount of dynamic lift from its engines. Dynamic lift in past airships has been about 10% of the static lift. Dynamic lift allows an airship to "take off heavy" from a runway similar to fixed-wing and rotary-wing aircraft. This requires additional weight in the engines, fuel, and landing gear, thereby reducing some of the static lift capacity.

The altitude at which an airship can fly largely depends on how much lifting gas it can lose due to expansion before stasis is reached. The ultimate altitude record for a rigid airship was set in 1917 by the L-55 under the command of Hans-Kurt Flemming when he forced the airship to 7,300 m (24,000 ft) attempting to cross France after the "Silent Raid" on London. The L-55 lost lift during descent to lower altitudes over Germany and crashed. While such waste of gas was necessary for the survival of airships in the later years of World War I, it was impractical for commercial operations or operations of helium-filled military airships. The highest flight made by a hydrogen-filled passenger airship was 1,700 m (5,500 ft) on the Graf Zeppelin's around-the-world flight.

The greatest disadvantage of the airship is size, which is essential to increasing performance. As size increases, the problems of ground handling increase geometrically. As the German Navy changed from the P class of 1915 with a volume of over 31,000 m^{3} (1,100,000 ft^{3}) to the larger Q class of 1916, the R class of 1917, and finally the W class of 1918, at almost 62,000 m^{3} (2,200,000 ft^{3}) ground handling problems reduced the number of days the Zeppelins were able to make patrol flights. This availability declined from 34% in 1915 to 24.3% in 1916 and finally 17.5% in 1918.

So long as the power-to-weight ratios of aircraft engines remained low and specific fuel consumption high, the airship had an edge for long-range or long-duration operations. As those figures changed, the balance shifted rapidly in the aeroplane's favour. By mid-1917, the airship could no longer survive in combat against aeroplanes. By the late 1930s, the airship barely had an advantage over the aeroplane on intercontinental over-water flights, and that advantage had vanished by the end of World War II.

This is in face-to-face tactical situations. Currently, a high-altitude airship project is planned to survey hundreds of kilometres as their operation radius, often much farther than the normal engagement range of a military aeroplane. For example, a radar mounted on a vessel platform 30 m (100 ft) high has radio horizon at 20 km (12 mi) range, while a radar at 18,000 m (59,000 ft) altitude has radio horizon at 480 km (300 mi) range. This is significantly important for detecting low-flying cruise missiles or fighter-bombers.

== Safety ==
The most commonly used lifting gas, helium, is inert and therefore presents no fire risk. A series of vulnerability tests was done by the UK Defence Evaluation and Research Agency DERA on a Skyship 600. Since the internal gas pressure was maintained at only 1–2% above the surrounding air pressure, the vehicle proved highly tolerant to physical damage or to attack by small-arms fire or missiles. Several hundred high-velocity bullets were fired through the hull, and even two hours later, the vehicle would have been able to return to base. Ordnance passed through the envelope without causing critical helium loss. The results and related mathematical model are presented in the hypothesis of considering a Zeppelin NT-size airship. In all instances of light armament fire evaluated under both test and live conditions, the airship was able to complete its mission and return to base.

== Licensing ==
In the United Kingdom, the basic pilot licence for airships is the PPL(As), or private pilot licence, which requires a minimum of 35 hours of instruction in airships. To fly commercially, a Commercial Pilot Licence (Airships) is required.

== See also ==
- Airborne aircraft carrier
- Aircruise
- Airship hangar
- Barrage balloon
- Conrad Airship CA 80 (1975–1977)
- Evolutionary Air and Space Global Laser Engagement
- High-altitude platform station
- Hyperion, fictional airship type.
- List of airship accidents
- List of British airships
- List of current airships in the United States
- List of Zeppelins
- Mystery airship
- Worldwide Aeros Corp
- Zeppelin mail

== Notes ==
	Aerostat	Aerodyne		
	Lift: Lighter than air gas	Lift: Fixed wing	Lift: Unpowered rotor	Lift: Powered rotor
Unpowered free flight	(Free) balloon	Glider	Helicopter, etc. in autorotation	(None – see note 2)
Tethered (static or towed)	Tethered balloon	Kite	Rotor kite	(None – see note 2)
Powered	Airship	Airplane, ornithopter, etc.	Autogyro	Gyrodyne, helicopter
