= Lockheed Martin P-791 =

Experimental hybrid airship

P-791
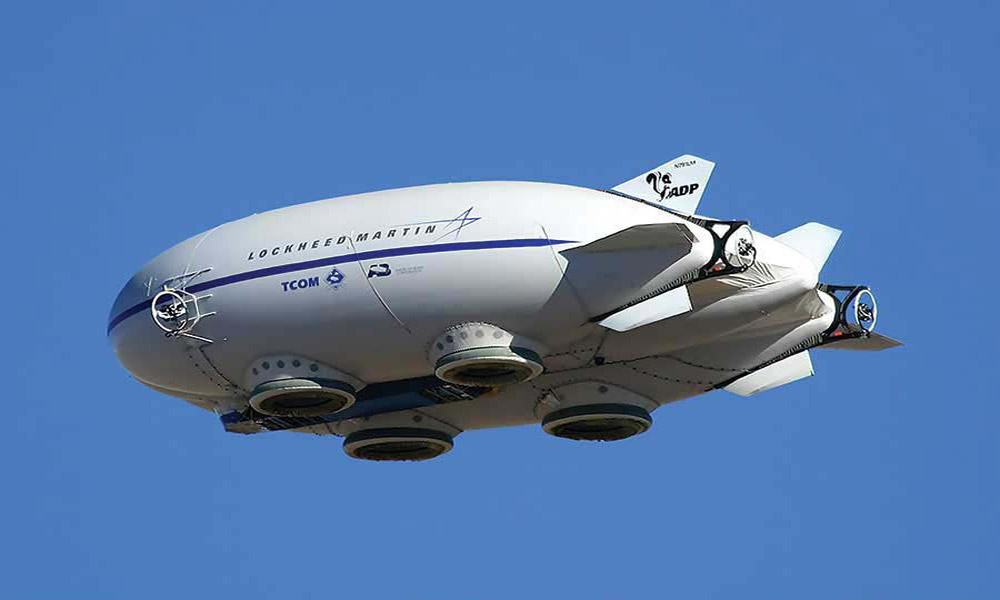
- Lockheed Martin P-791

General information
- Type: Hybrid airship
- National origin: United States
- Manufacturer: Lockheed Martin
- Status: Prototype
- Number built: 1

History
- First flight: 31 January 2006

The Lockheed Martin P-791 is an experimental aerostatic and aerodynamic hybrid airship developed by Lockheed Martin. The first flight of the P-791 took place on 31 January 2006 at the company's flight test facility at United States Air Force Plant 42 in Palmdale, CA.

== Description ==
The P-791 has a tri-hull shape, with disk-shaped cushions on the bottom for landing. As a hybrid airship, part of the weight of the craft and its payload are supported by aerostatic (buoyant) lift and the remainder is supported by aerodynamic lift. The combination of aerodynamic and aerostatic lift is an attempt to benefit from both the high speed of aerodynamic craft and the lifting capacity of aerostatic craft.

== History ==
The P-791 was designed as part of the U.S. Army's Long Endurance Multi-intelligence Vehicle (LEMV) program, but lost the program's competition to Northrop Grumman's HAV-3 design. The P-791 was modified to be a civil cargo aircraft under the name SkyTug, with a lift capability of 20 short tons (18,000 kg) and plans to scale larger.

In March 2016, Straightline Aviation signed a Letter of intent for 12 LMH1 airships, valued at $480 million.

== LMH-1 ==
In 2014, Hybrid Enterprises from Atlanta, Georgia entered into an agreement with Lockheed Martin to market and sell the commercial LMH-1 Hybrid Aircraft built by Lockheed, based on the technology demonstrated by the P-791.

At the Paris Air Show in June 2015, Lockheed Martin announced that all required FAA certification planning steps were complete, and Hybrid Enterprises was accepting orders. The LMH1 would initially transport 20 tonnes of cargo or 19 passengers, plus 2 crew members, with deliveries beginning in 2018. In September 2016, plans were announced to operate the LMH-1 craft in Alaska.

In September 2017 it was announced that the first flight of the LMH-1 was being delayed to 2019.

In May 2023, Lockheed Martin announced the transfer of intellectual property and assets related to their airship business, and the LMH-1, to a new company, called AT^{2} Aerospace, which would continue the development of the LMH-1 as the Z1 hybrid airship.

== LMZ1M ==
The Lockheed Martin LMZ1M is the follow on to the P-791 test vehicle.

== See also ==
- Hybrid Air Vehicles HAV 304 Airlander 10
- Aeroscraft
- EosXi
- Helistat
- Thermoplan
