= SkyCat =

UK series of aerostat

SkyCat (a portmanteau of "Sky Catamaran") is a class of proposed heavy-lift hybrid airships which derive more than half of their lift by helium buoyancy and the balance via aerodynamic lift produced by aerodynamic shaping. The SkyCat design incorporates hover cushion technology in place of wheels, allowing craft to take off and land anywhere, including remote regions without need for airports or sophisticated forward based infrastructure.

The SkyKitten, a 1/6 linear scale model of a SkyCat design was built and flown by Advanced Technologies Group (ATG) (now-defunct successor to Airship Industries) in the United Kingdom at Cardington.

"SkyFreighter" is the name given by the Hybrid Air Vehicles to one of its implementations of the SkyCat design. These are proposed to carry heavy-lift and ultra-heavy-lift cargo payloads from 50 tons net payload to as heavy as 1000 tons which may be a mix of outsized and/or containerized objects.

The Skycat is almost impervious to light ordnance, such as automatic rifle or mortar fire, which will merely pass through the metallized PET film envelope without causing critical helium loss.

SkyCat air vehicle developments are being pursued by at least one major aerospace company. DARPA concluded their "WALRUS" contract with industry to explore technology options that might be employed in such vehicles as SkyCat in CY-2006.

ATG went into administration in 2005 having produced only one airship, the SkyCat. SkyCat Group was formed and bought ATG's operations. In turn Hybrid Air Vehicles of the UK was formed acquiring the assets of SkyCat Group in 2007 to continue development of the concept.

== See also ==
- EosXi
- P-791 - a very similar aircraft from Lockheed-Martin
