= Hybrid airship =

Partially aero-static aircraft

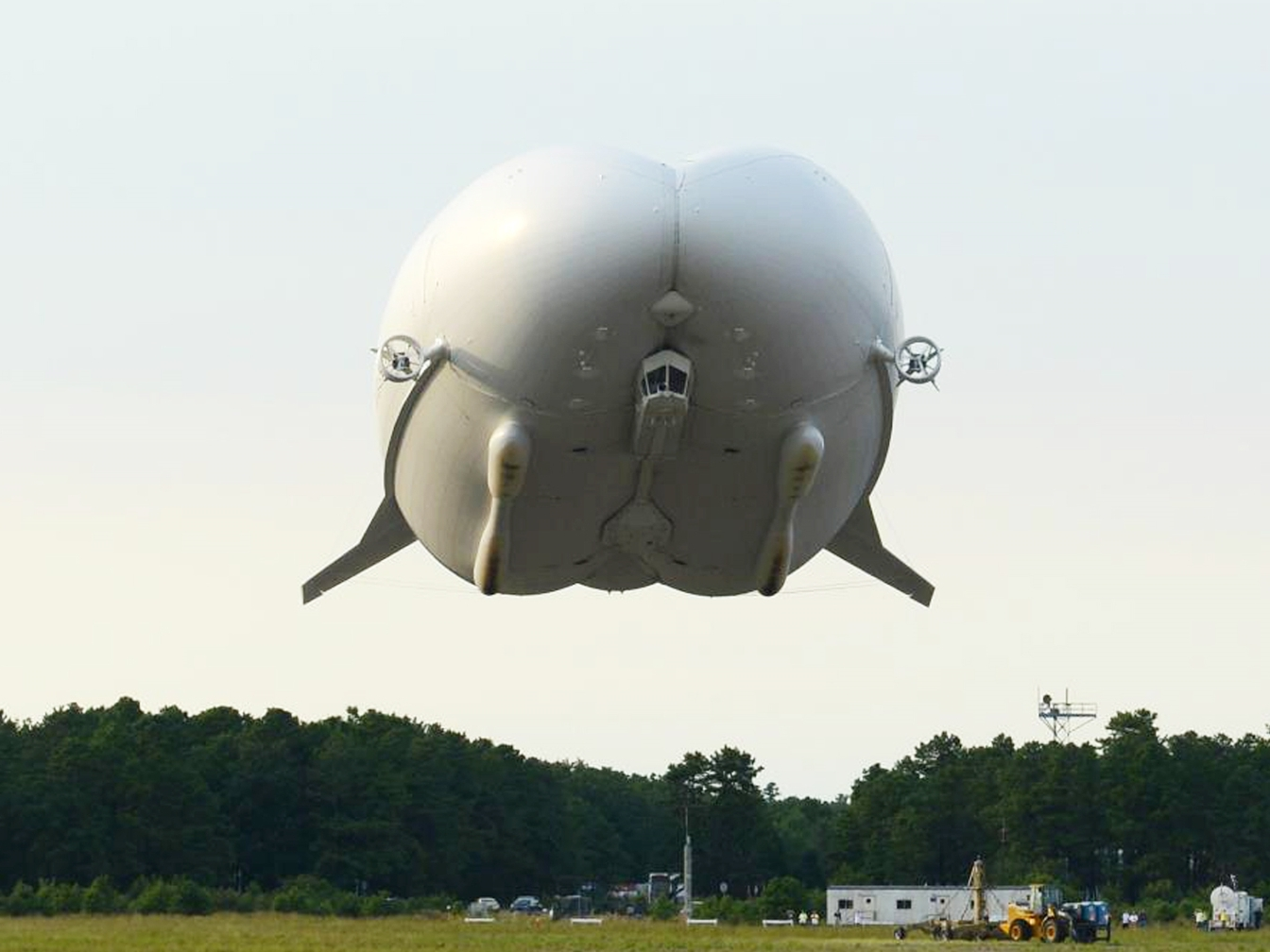
The HAV 304 dynastat, seen bow-on

A hybrid airship is a powered aircraft that obtains some of its lift as a lighter-than-air (LTA) airship and some from aerodynamic lift as a heavier-than-air aerodyne.

A dynastat is a hybrid airship with fixed wings and/or a lifting body and is typically intended for long-endurance flights. It requires forward flight to create the aerodynamic lift component.

A rotastat is a hybrid airship with rotary wings and is typically intended for heavy lift applications. Its rotary wings can provide lift even when hovering or manoeuvring vertically, like a helicopter.

No production designs have been built, but several crewed and uncrewed prototypes have flown.

The term "hybrid airship" has also been used to describe an airship comprising a mix of rigid, semi-rigid, and non-rigid construction.

== Features ==
Conventional airships have low operating costs because they need no engine power to remain airborne, but are limited in several ways, including low payload/volume ratios and low speeds. Additionally, ground handling of an airship can be difficult. Because it is floating, in even a light breeze it is susceptible to wind buffeting.

On the other hand, heavier-than-air aircraft, or aerodynes, especially rotorcraft, require the constant use of power to generate lift, and conventional airplanes also require runways.

The hybrid airship combines the airship's aerostatic lift, from a lighter-than-air gas such as helium, with the heavier-than-air craft's dynamic lift from movement through the air. Such a hybrid craft is still heavier than air, which makes it similar in some ways to a conventional aircraft. The dynamic lift may be provided by helicopter-like rotary wings (the rotastat), or a lift-producing shape similar to a lifting body combined with horizontal thrust (the dynastat), or a combination of the two.

Hybrid airships are intended to fill the middle ground between the low operating cost and low speeds of traditional airships and the higher speed but higher fuel consumption of heavier-than-air craft. By combining dynamic and buoyant lift, hybrids are intended to provide improved airspeed, air-cargo payload capacity and (in some types) hovering capability compared to a pure airship, while having longer endurance and greater lifting capacity compared to a pure aerodyne.

Hybrid aircraft technology is claimed to allow a wider range of flight-performance optimizations ranging from significantly heavier than air to near buoyant. This perception of uncommon dynamic flight range when coupled with an appropriate landing system is claimed to allow ultra heavy and affordable airlift transportation.

== Design ==
Compared to a conventional airship, the hybrid can be made smaller and does not need to carry ballast for altitude control, while compared to a heavier-than-air craft the hybrid requires either a smaller rotor or a shorter runway.

Where the dynastat is seen as more promising in the longer-distance passenger and freight roles, the rotastat is anticipated to be more suitable as a "flying crane" able to lift heavy external loads for shorter distances.

Some airships employ thrust vectoring, typically using pivoted ducted fan propulsors, to provide additional lift when the engine thrust is no longer needed for forward propulsion. Once airspeed is gained, the craft can use body lift to help carry a load greater than its aerostatic lift capacity alone. However, such airships are not usually regarded as hybrids.

=== Dynastats ===
The dynastat obtains additional lift by flying through the air. Configurations studied have included using deltoid (triangular), lenticular (circular), or flattened hulls, or adding a fixed wing.

Some early airships were fitted with wing planes, with the intention of providing additional dynamic lift. However, the added lift of planes can be less efficient than simply increasing the volume of the airship. At low air speeds, of 60 mph (97 km/h) or less, the increase in lift obtained by the use of planes on an airship would require a disproportionate increase in engine power and fuel consumption compared to increasing the size of the gas bags. Moreover, the attachment of flying surfaces to the airship's envelope would require significant structural strengthening, with attendant weight gain.

Conventional airships often make use of aerodynamic lift by using their elevators to set a nose-up attitude so that the main body of the airship provides some lift as it flies along; however, this is typically done to counteract minor out-of-trim conditions, and it is as likely that the nose may need to be pointed down to reduce lift.

Some Hybrid designs, such as the Lockheed Martin LMZ1M (follow on to the Lockheed Martin P-791 test vehicle), use a flattened or multi-lobed hull to increase the aerodynamic lift obtainable. The aerodynamic approach is similar to that of a lifting body aircraft, although the airspeeds involved are much lower. Attainable dynamic-lift-to-drag ratios are significantly below those of efficient fixed wings, in part because induced drag increases with decreasing aspect ratio. As a result, the lift comes at a higher drag penalty than when using wings. On the other hand, compared to a helicopter, the dynastat has better fuel efficiency within a given speed range.

Another issue arises during takeoff and landing, when, in calmer conditions, the airspeed may be too low to provide sufficient aerodynamic lift. For this reason, the dynastat is often conceived of as a STOL rather than VTOL aircraft, requiring a shorter runway than a conventional airplane.

=== Rotastats ===
The rotastat obtains additional lift from powered rotors, similarly to a helicopter. Single-, twin-, and four-rotor designs have all been studied.

Early examples in the inter-war period included designs by Oehmichen and Zodiac. These used the rotors for vertical control only, with additional powered propellers for forward flight, as in the gyrocopter.

In more recent times, the experimental Piasecki PA-97 "Helistat" attached four helicopter airframes to a helium blimp, while the SkyHook JHL-40 remains a project. Typically, aerostatic lift is sufficient to support the weight of the craft itself, while, when a load is carried, the rotors provide additional lift as required.

=== Gliding under gravity ===
If an airship does not have enough lift, it will sink under gravity. By angling the nose down, this can lead to a gliding forward flight just like a conventional glider. If an airship has excess lift, it will rise. By angling the nose up, this can also lead to forward movement. In this way, an airship which periodically alternates its buoyancy between positive and negative, while adjusting its attitude accordingly, can gain almost continuous aerodynamic forward thrust. Thus, flight proceeds in a leisurely vertical zig-zag pattern. Because no energy is consumed directly in creating thrust, the principle allows for flights of long duration, although at slow speeds. The proposed Hunt GravityPlane is a hybrid airship designed to take full advantage of gravity gliding.

The principle also works underwater, where it is used operationally in the underwater glider.

Historically, this principle of aerial navigation, under the name of Wellenflug (wavy flight) was first formulated and experimentally tested in the year 1899 by Konstantin Danilevsky in Kharkov, Russian Empire, and described in detail in his book/

Theoretically, a hydrogen fuel cell could be used in tandem with an electrolysis cell to control the buoyancy of gliding Hybrid Airships. Solar or other onboard electricity sources would be needed to replenish the hydrogen, and to power navigational equipment. Unfortunately, the flammability of Hydrogen (see Hindenburg Disaster) may cause regulatory issues, which may explain the lack of current experiments using this combination of technology.

== History ==
=== Early hybrids ===
Gliding under gravity dates from the period during and shortly after the American Civil War, when Solomon Andrews built two such airships. The first of these, Aereon, used three individual cigar shaped balloons rigged together in a flat plane; the second, Aereon #2, employed a single "lemon-shaped" balloon. Andrews' Aereons were propelled by angling the balloons upward and dropping ballast, then process was then reversed with the balloons being angled downward and large quantities of lifting gas being vented.

In 1905 Alberto Santos-Dumont conducted various experiments with his first airplane, the Santos-Dumont 14-bis, prior to attempting to fly it for the first time. These included hanging it from a steel cable and towing it, and subsequently hanging it beneath the envelope of a previously built airship (Number 14) - akin to learning to swim with "water wings". The combined craft was unusable, and was broken up, being referred to as "a monstrous hybrid". After these "rehearsals" were completed, Santos-Dumont made the first public demonstration of a heavier-than-air aircraft in Europe.

In 1907 the British Army Dirigible No 1 (named Nulli Secundus) first flew. It used aerodynamic surfaces for attitude control in flight, and for its first flight was also fitted with large wings amidships. The wings were intended to aid stability rather than provide lift and were removed for all subsequent flights. The use of dynamic lift by pitching the nose of the airship up or down was also recognised and practised on this airship.

In June 1907 Alberto Santos Dumont constructed his No. 16, described by l'Aérophile as an appareil mixte. This had a 99 m^{3} (3,500 ft^{3}) envelope but was too heavy to fly without supplementary lift supplied by a 4 m (13 ft) wing surface. It was tested without success on 8 June 1907.

=== Modern hybrids ===
The Aereon 26 was an aircraft which made its first flight in 1971. It was a small-scale prototype of the hybrid Airship Aereon Dynairship and part of the "TIGER" project. But it was never built due to lack of market for a hybrid airship.

In 1984 the AeroLift CycloCrane helistat flew briefly.

The 1986 Piasecki PA-97 Helistat experimental design combined four helicopters with a blimp in an attempt to create a heavy-lift vehicle for forestry work. It broke up at the end of its first flight.

The SkyCat or "Sky Catamaran" vehicular technology is a hybrid aircraft amalgamation; a scale version at 12 meters called "SkyKitten", built by the Advanced Technologies Group Ltd, flew in 2000. The U.S. Defense Advanced Research Projects Agency (DARPA) initiated the Walrus Hybrid Ultra Large Aircraft program in 2005, a technology development initiative focused on ultra heavy air lift technology explorations. The program was terminated in 2007.

In 2006, the Lockheed Martin P-791 underwent uncrewed flight tests. It was an unsuccessful candidate for the military Long Endurance Multi-intelligence Vehicle program even though it was the only successful Hybrid Airship to have ever flown until 7 August 2016.

In 2008, Boeing announced that it was teaming up with SkyHook to develop a heavy duty lifting vehicle, the SkyHook JHL-40 Boeing subsequently shelved the project.

The Hybrid Air Vehicles HAV 304 was built for the US Army Long Endurance Multi-intelligence Vehicle (LEMV) program. It flew successfully for 90 minutes in August 2012. Following cancellation of the LEMV project, Hybrid Air Vehicles re-purchased the HAV 304 vehicle and brought it back to the UK. It has been refurbished and renamed the Airlander 10. On August 17, 2016, the Airlander 10 had its first successful test flight outside the Cardington Hangars at RAF Cardington. Chief Test Pilot Dave Burns said in a statement "It was privilege to fly the Airlander for the first time and it flew wonderfully. I’m really excited about getting it airborne. It flew like a dream." Over 200 more flight hours are needed for full certification.

Airlander 10 completed design certification testing before being written off when it came loose from its moorings in a high wind on 18 November 2017 at Cardington Airfield.

=== Other current projects ===
An Australian-based company is working on a project to develop an air crane called the SkyLifter, a capable of lifting up to 150 tons.

A Canadian start-up, Solar Ship, Inc., is developing solar powered hybrid airships that can run on solar power alone. The idea is to create a viable platform that can travel anywhere in the world delivering cold medical supplies and other necessitates to locations in Africa and Northern Canada without needing any kind of fuel or infrastructure. The hope is that technology developments in solar cells and the large surface area provided by the hybrid airship are enough to make a practical solar powered aircraft. Some key features of the Solarship are that it can fly on aerodynamic lift alone without any lifting gas, and the solar cells along with the large volume of the envelope allow the hybrid airship to be reconfigured into a mobile shelter that can recharge batteries and other equipment.

The Hunt GravityPlane (not to be confused with the ground-based gravity plane) is a proposed gravity-powered glider by Hunt Aviation in the US. It also has aerofoil wings, improving its lift-drag ratio and making it more efficient. The GravityPlane requires a large size in order to obtain a large enough volume-to-weight ratio to support this wing structure, and no example has yet been built. Unlike a powered glider, the GravityPlane does not consume power during the climbing phase of flight. It does however consume power at the points where it changes its buoyancy between positive and negative values. Hunt claim that this can nevertheless improve the energy efficiency of the craft, similar to the improved energy efficiency of underwater gliders over conventional methods of propulsion. Hunt suggest that the low power consumption should allow the craft to harvest sufficient energy to stay aloft indefinitely. The conventional approach to this requirement is the use of solar panels in a solar-powered aircraft. Hunt has proposed two alternative approaches. One is to use a wind turbine and harvest energy from the airflow generated by the gliding motion, the other is a thermal cycle to extract energy from the differences in air temperature at different altitudes.

== List of hybrid airships ==
Type	Country	Class	Date	Role	Status	Notes
AeroLift CycloCrane	USA	Rotastat	1984	Flying crane	Prototype	
Dynalifter	USA	Dynalifter Group	2007	Experimental	Prototype	Technology demonstrator - destroyed on the ground in a storm
Andrews Aereon	USA	Gravity glider	1863?	Experimental	Prototype	Propulsion by alternately dropping ballast and venting gas.
Andrews Aereon 2	USA	Gravity glider	1866?	Experimental	Prototype	Propulsion by alternately dropping ballast and venting gas.
ATG SkyKitten	United Kingdom	Dynastat	2000	Experimental	Prototype	Scale demonstrator for the proposed SkyCat.
Hunt GravityPlane	USA	Gravity glider			Project	Various means of ballast control and energy harvesting proposed.
Hybrid Air Vehicles HAV-3	United Kingdom	Dynastat	2008	Experimental	Prototype	Technology demonstrator.
Hybrid Air Vehicles HAV 304/Airlander 10	United Kingdom	Dynastat	2012	Multi-role	Prototype	Built in conjunction with Northrop Grumman as the HAV 304 for the US Army LEMV programme. Rebuilt as the Airlander 10.
Lockheed Martin P-791	USA	Dynastat	2006	Experimental	Prototype	Led to the proposed LMZ1M and LMH1.
Nimbus EosXi	Italy	Dynastat	2006	UAV		Delta-wing hybrid.
Piasecki PA-97 Helistat	USA	Rotastat	1986	Flying crane	Prototype	The only prototype was destroyed on July 1, 1986 in a crash.
SkyHook JHL-40	USA	Rotastat	2008	Flying crane	Project	Joint project with Boeing. Proposed in 2008. Development was halted until funding increases.
Thermoplan ALA-40	Russia	Dynastat	1992	Experimental	Prototype	Lenticular scale demonstrator for the proposed ALA-600, the only prototype was destroyed in a ground accident in 1992.
Walrus HULA	USA	Dynastat	2010	Transport	Project	DARPA project, cancelled 2010.

== See also ==
- Kytoon—a tethered kite/balloon hybrid

	Aerostat	Aerodyne		
	Lift: Lighter than air gas	Lift: Fixed wing	Lift: Unpowered rotor	Lift: Powered rotor
Unpowered free flight	(Free) balloon	Glider	Helicopter, etc. in autorotation	(None – see note 2)
Tethered (static or towed)	Tethered balloon	Kite	Rotor kite	(None – see note 2)
Powered	Airship	Airplane, ornithopter, etc.	Autogyro	Gyrodyne, helicopter
