= Cardington Airfield =

Former Royal Air Force station in Bedfordshire, England

- Near Shortstown, Bedfordshire in England
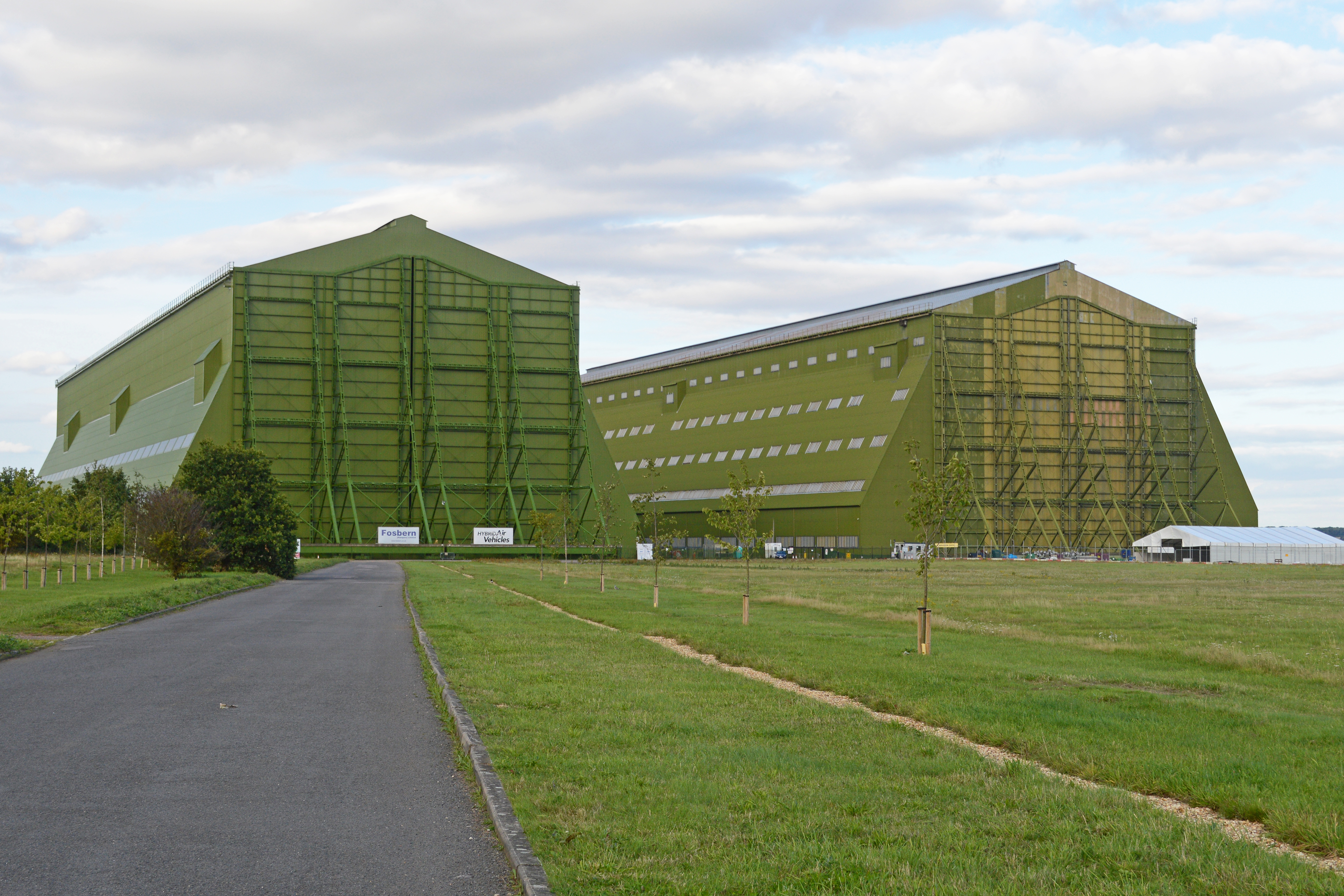
- Former airship sheds at Cardington during 2017.

Site information
- Type: Airfield
- Owner: Ministry of Defence (MOD)
- Condition: Closed

Location
- Location within Bedfordshire
- Coordinates: 52°06′32″N 000°25′21″W
- Height: 170 feet (52 m)

Site history
- Built: 1915
- In use: 1915–2000
- Fate: Sold for residential redevelopment and various private uses.; Former airship sheds remain and are designated as listed buildings.; Part of the site is retained by the MOD and leased to the Met Office.

Airfield information
- Elevation: 30 metres (98 ft) AMSL

Cardington Airfield, previously RAF Cardington, is a former Royal Air Force station in Bedfordshire, England, with a long and varied history, particularly in relation to airships and balloons. The station was formerly part of the civil parish of Eastcotts, before that was abolished on 1 April 2019.

== History ==
=== Construction under the Short brothers ===
The site started life as a private venture when aircraft manufacturing company Short Brothers bought land there to build airships for the Admiralty. It constructed a 700-foot-long (210 m) Airship hangar (the No. 1 Shed) in 1915 to enable it to build two rigid airships, the R-31 and the R-32. Short also built a housing estate, opposite the site, which it named Shortstown.

=== Royal Airship Works ===
The airships site was nationalised in April 1919, becoming known as the Royal Airship Works.

In preparation for the R101 project, the No. 1 shed was extended between October 1924 and March 1926; its roof was raised by 35 feet and its length increased to 812 feet. The No. 2 (southern) shed, which had originally been located at RNAS Pulham, Norfolk was dismantled in 1928 and re-erected at Cardington.

After the crash of the R101, in October 1930, all airship work in Britain stopped. Cardington then became a storage station.

During 1936-7 Cardington started building barrage balloons; it became the No 1 RAF Balloon Training Unit responsible for the storage and training of balloon operators and drivers. From 1943 to 1967 it was home to the RAF meteorological research balloons training unit, undertaking development and storage (after 1967 this was undertaken by the Royal Aircraft Establishment).

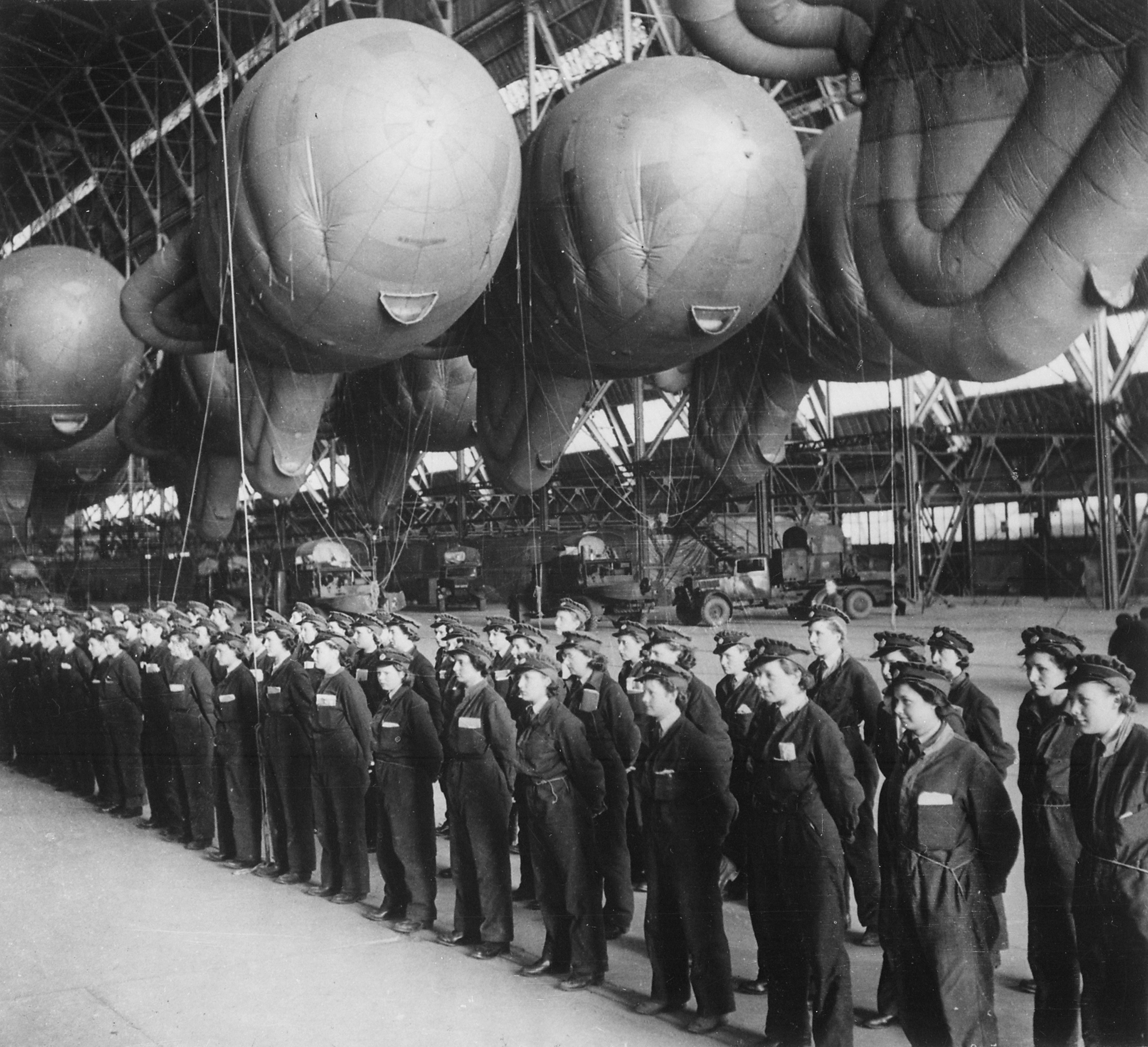
WAAF Barrage Balloon crews at RAF Cardington.

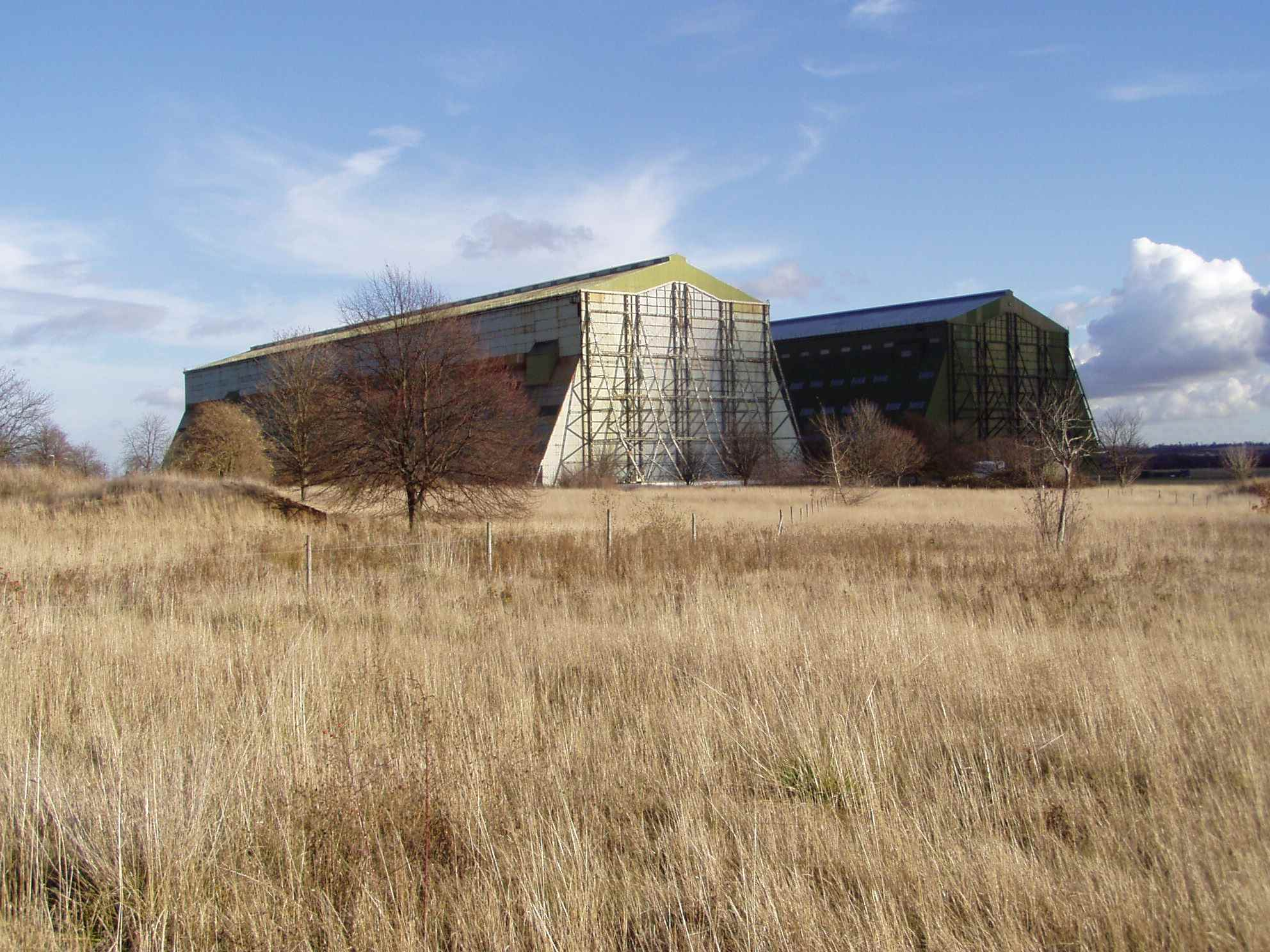

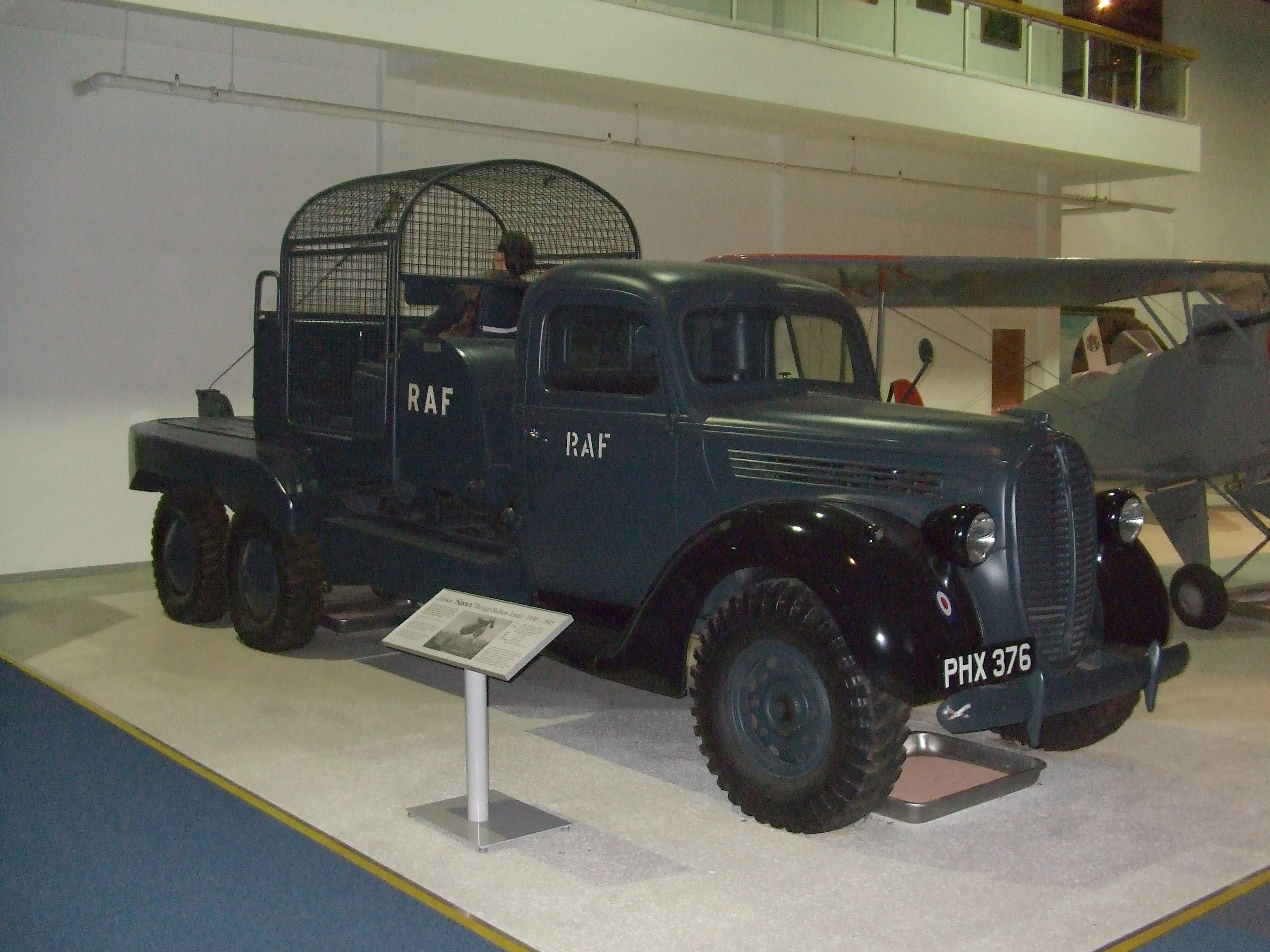
Restored Fordson Sussex Balloon Winch Tender

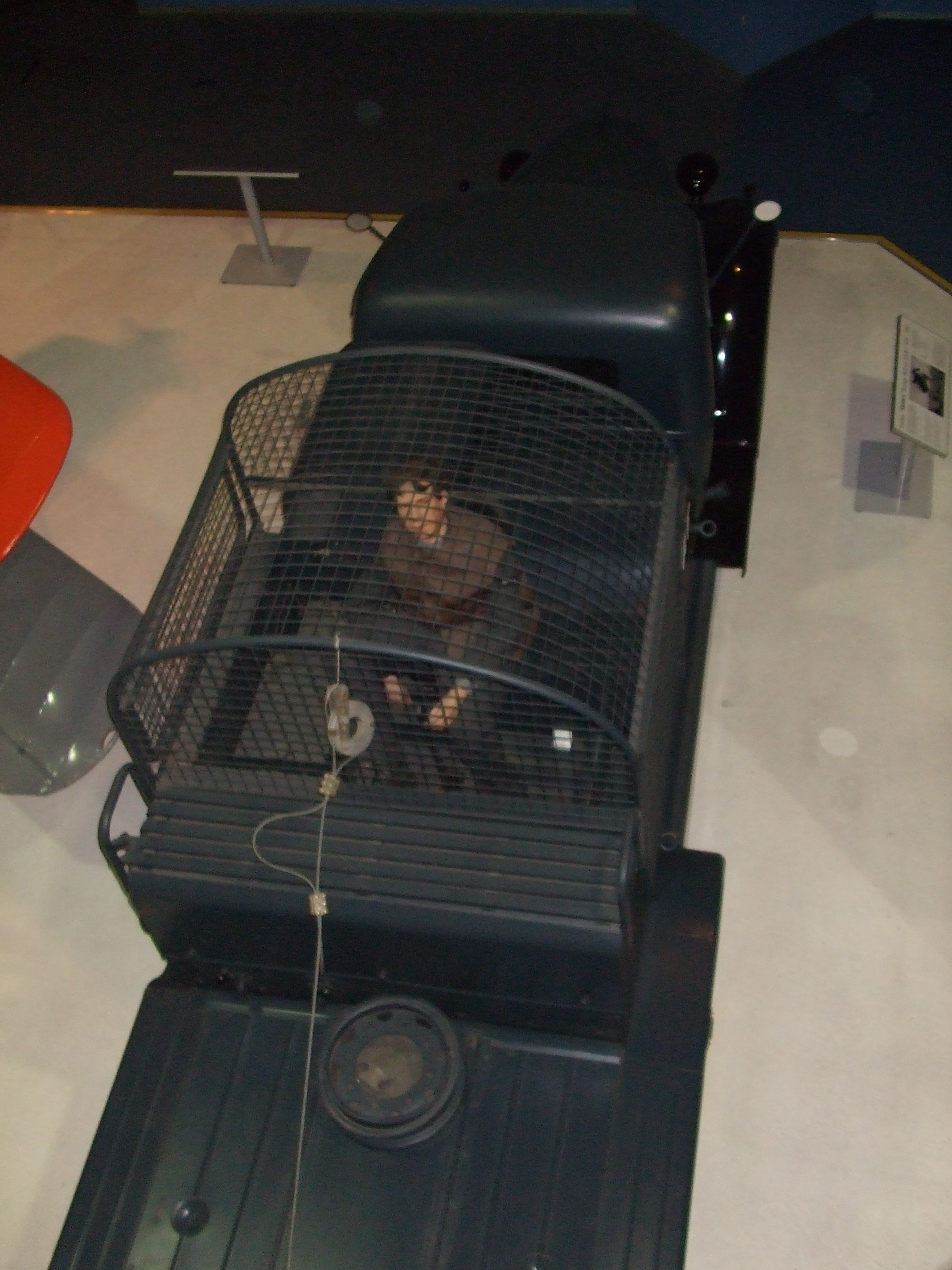
Rear view of Fordson Sussex on display at the RAF Museum Hendon.

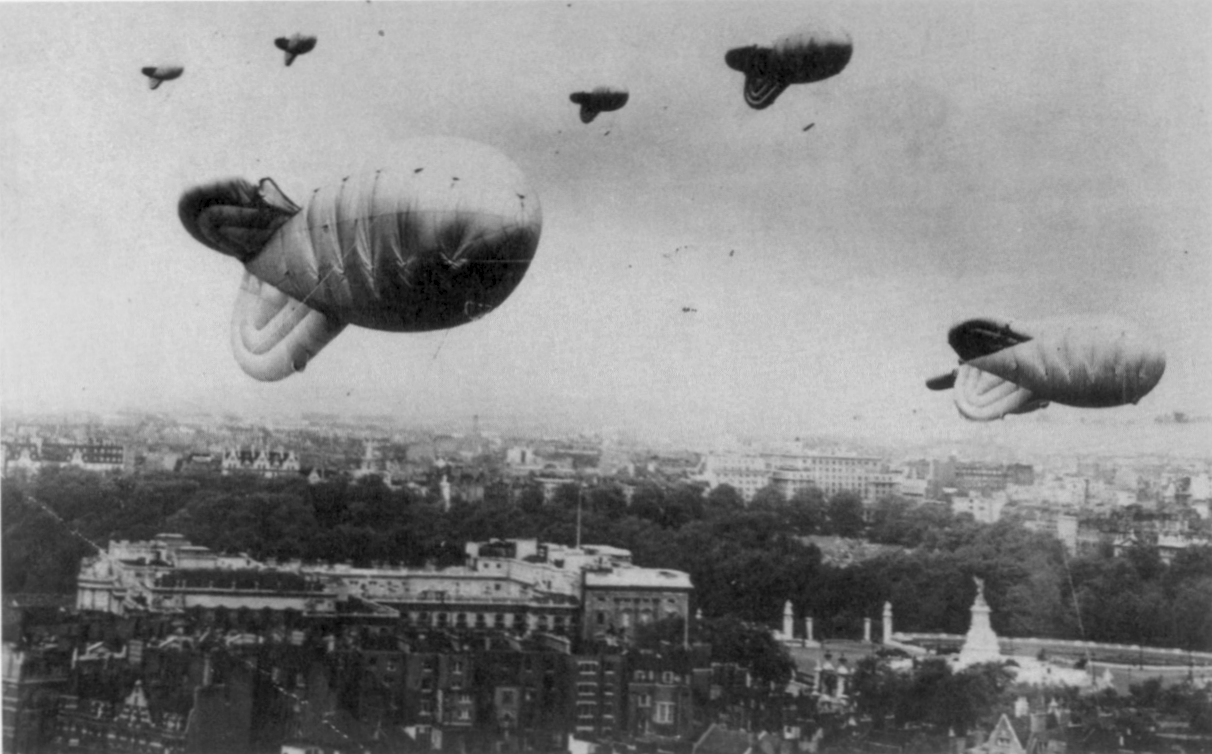
Balloons over London.

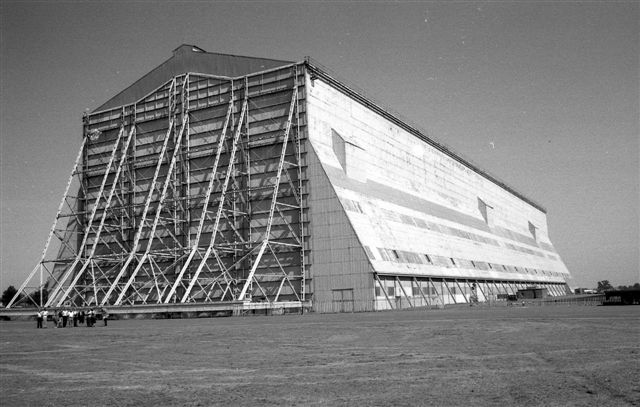
One of the two Cardington sheds with people in the foreground for scale.

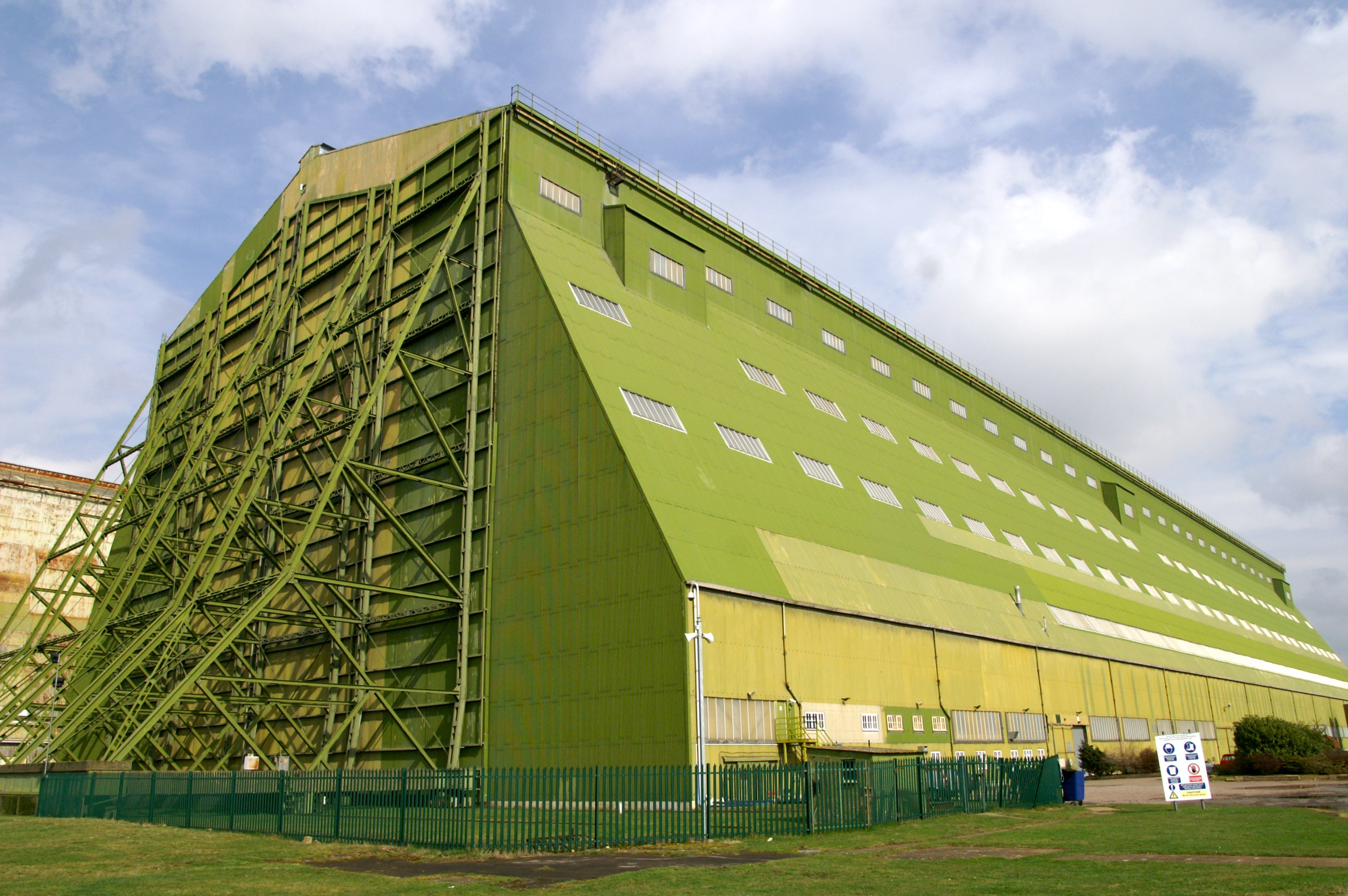
Hangar 2 (the RNAS shed from Pulham, Norfolk)

=== Post airship use ===
The two airship sheds ceased being part of the RAF Cardington site in the late 1940s and they were put to other uses. The fence was moved, so that they were outside the main RAF Cardington site.

During the 1950s, RAF Cardington was the reception unit for National Service and saw thousands of recruits issued with their kit. The Parachute Regiment was stationed there as one of the hangars housed the balloons from which trainees made their first drops. In 1954 RAF Maintenance Command used Shed No.1 for its rehearsals for the Royal Tournament. The Royal Marine Commandos also used Shed No.1 for its rehearsals for the 1987 Royal Tournament.

Hangar 1 was used by the Royal Aircraft Establishment (RAE) to operate balloons on behalf of the Met Office carrying instruments to measure conditions in the atmosphere. The balloons were also used in parachute development (although they were unmanned – using a heavy dead weight); much of this work was carried out in secret.

For both airships and barrage balloons, Cardington manufactured its own hydrogen, in the Gas Factory, using the steam reforming process. In 1948 the Gas Factory became 279 MU (Maintenance Unit), RAF Cardington; and then, in 1955, 217 MU.

217 MU, RAF Cardington, produced all the gases used by the Royal Air Force until its closure in April 2000; including gas cylinder filling and maintenance.

The following units were here at some point:

- No. 1 Balloon Repair Depot (1940)
- No. 2 Aircraft Storage Unit (1933-38)
- No. 2 RAF Depot (1937-39)
- No. 2 Recruit Receiving Centre (1939-40)
- No. 4 Aviation Candidates Selection Board (1939-44)
- No. 7 Aviation Candidates Selection Board (1939-44)
- No. 9 Aviation Candidates Selection Board (1940-44)
- No. 14 Joint Services Trials Unit (1959)
- No. 19 Aviation Candidates Selection Board (1940-44)
- No. 20 Aviation Candidates Selection Board (1940-44)
- Sub site of No. 25 Maintenance Unit RAF (1939-1956)
- No. 26 Maintenance Unit RAF (1938-39 & 1940-47)
- No. 102 'P' Balloon Flight (1944)
- No. 102 Personnel Dispersal Centre (1945-46)
- No. 104 'P' Balloon Flight (1944)
- No. 172 Personnel Transit Centre (1952)
- No. 217 Maintenance Unit RAF (1955-)
- No. 244 Maintenance Unit RAF (1953-55)
- No. 260 (Balloon) Wing
- No. 912 (Balloon) Squadron
- No. 914 (Balloon) Squadron
- No. 924 (Balloon) Squadron
- No. 931 (Balloon) Squadron
- No. 954 (Balloon) Squadron
- No. 955 (Balloon) Squadron
- No. 956 (Balloon) Squadron
- No. 957 (Balloon) Squadron
- No. 958 (Balloon) Squadron
- No. 959 (Balloon) Squadron
- No. 963 (Balloon) Squadron
- No. 965 (Balloon) Squadron
- No. 967 (Balloon) Squadron
- No. 970 (Balloon) Squadron
- No. 971 (Balloon) Squadron
- No. 972 (Balloon) Squadron
- No. 973 (Balloon) Squadron
- No. 974 (Balloon) Squadron
- No. 975 (Balloon) Squadron
- No. 976 (Balloon) Squadron
- No. 986 (Balloon) Squadron
- No. 990 (Balloon) Squadron
- No. 2802 Squadron RAF Regiment
- Ferry Flight, Cardington RAF (1939)
- Polish Balloon Unit (1945-46)
- Training Aids Development Unit RAF (1944-46)

== Post military use ==
=== Driving Standards Agency (DSA) ===
The northern part of the site has for many years been used by the UK Government Driving Standards Agency Training and Development Centre to train Driving Examiners.

=== Building Research Establishment ===
In 1971 Hangar 2 became the Fire Research Station (part of the Home Office) which conducted gas explosion experiments and for investigating fires. Full scale testing and fire research was undertaken from 1989. In 1990 the facility was transferred to Building Research Establishment as a whole building test facility for the Cardington tests. Here, multi-storey steel, concrete and wooden buildings were constructed and then destructively tested within the huge space available. This shed was repainted and maintained in comparison with Shed 1.

The buildings tests were mentioned during the course of the BBC series The Conspiracy Files as evidence in the controversy surrounding the collapse of World Trade Center Building 7 on 11 September 2001.

=== Meteorological Research Unit ===
There has been Meteorological Office presence on the site since flying began in the 1920s and The Met Office association continues by maintaining a Meteorological Research Unit (MRU). This is responsible for conducting research into part of the atmosphere called the boundary layer by using a tethered helium balloon which is kept in a small portable hangar. A continuous record of surface meteorological observations has also been made since 1996.

=== Indoor model aircraft flying ===
By the support of Lord Brabazon, fliers of extreme lightweight high-performance indoor flying models obtained access over a period of over 40 years. The first F1D World Championship took place in Cardington in 1961. Four world championships were held in the 1970s and 1980s for teams from across Europe and the United States. Record flights were made of over 45 minutes under the highest available ceiling in the UK.

=== 134 Squadron Air Training Corps ===
134 Sqn of the Air Training Corps has been based since 1953 within the former RAF Cardington site. As part of the redevelopment, a new Squadron headquarters has been built.

=== Airships return to Cardington ===
A company called Airship Industries attempted to revive the fortunes of the airship industry in the Shed 1 (on closure of the RAE operation) in the 1980s, but the efforts ended in failure. As of 2022, the site was being used for the development of a hybrid airship, the Airlander 10, by the company Hybrid Air Vehicles.

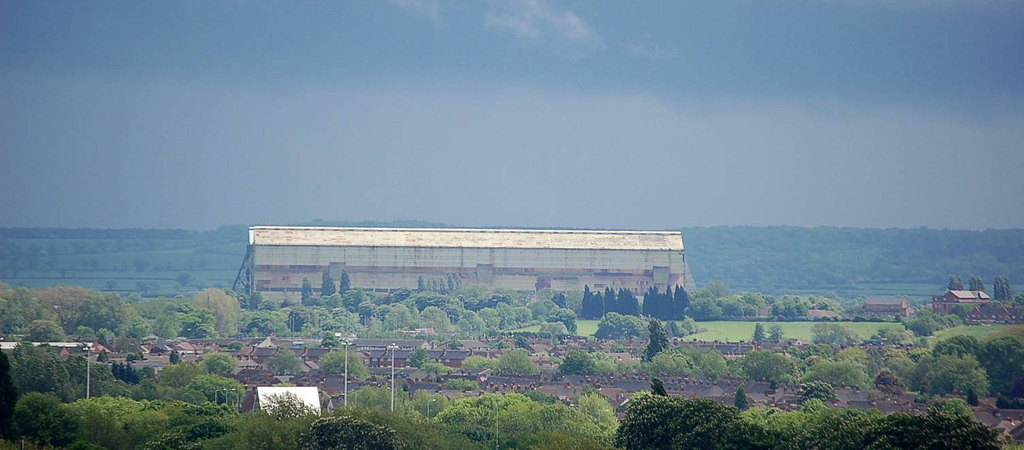
Cardington Airship Sheds (Shed 1)

== Media ==
In 1993 planning permission was granted for construction of theatrical stagings and the site was used for rehearsals by musicians including Paul McCartney Band on the Run: 25th Anniversary Edition, Spice Girls, U2, Rod Stewart, One Direction, Take That and AC/DC.

In 1968 some scenes for Chitty Chitty Bang Bang were filmed at Cardington Sheds. Also during the 1960s, much of the film Those Magnificent Men in Their Flying Machines was shot in the vicinity of the village. In 1971 the sheds appeared in the First World War war film Zeppelin starring Michael York.

The Star Wars film series has used both Sheds 1 and 2 for filming. Shed 1 was used to represent the Rebel base on Yavin 4 in the original 1977 film, and Shed 2 was later used itself for the Yavin base in the 2016 standalone film Rogue One.

In 2012, Shed 2 was leased to Warner Bros. and is used as a studio for film and television productions. Director Christopher Nolan has used this location to film scenes for three of his movies; scenes from Batman Begins, The Dark Knight, and Inception were filmed in Shed 2. Christopher Nolan returned to this location during the summer of 2011 to film the plane scene for his third and final Batman film, The Dark Knight Rises.

Parts of Curly's Airships, a concept album from 2000, about R101, by Judge Smith, were recorded in the sheds.

The film Sky Captain and the World of Tomorrow was filmed at Cardington in 2004.

Rihanna filmed parts of her music video for "Shut up and drive" there.

In Series 14 Episode 3 of the motoring show Top Gear presenter James May used Cardington as the base for his 'Caravan Airship'.

In 2017 parts of the Disney film Dumbo were shot in Shed 2.

Three Warner Bros. films were shot in the sheds along with Warner Bros. Studios, Leavesden were: Pan, Fantastic Beasts and Where to Find Them and Justice League.

In 2023, it was used for a Channel 4 reality television series, Scared of the Dark, and Netflix reality competition series Squid Game: The Challenge.

== New Cardington development ==
Construction company Bellway Homes has bought most of the Cardington site and is building 1000 new homes on the site.

== Restoration of Hangar 1 ==
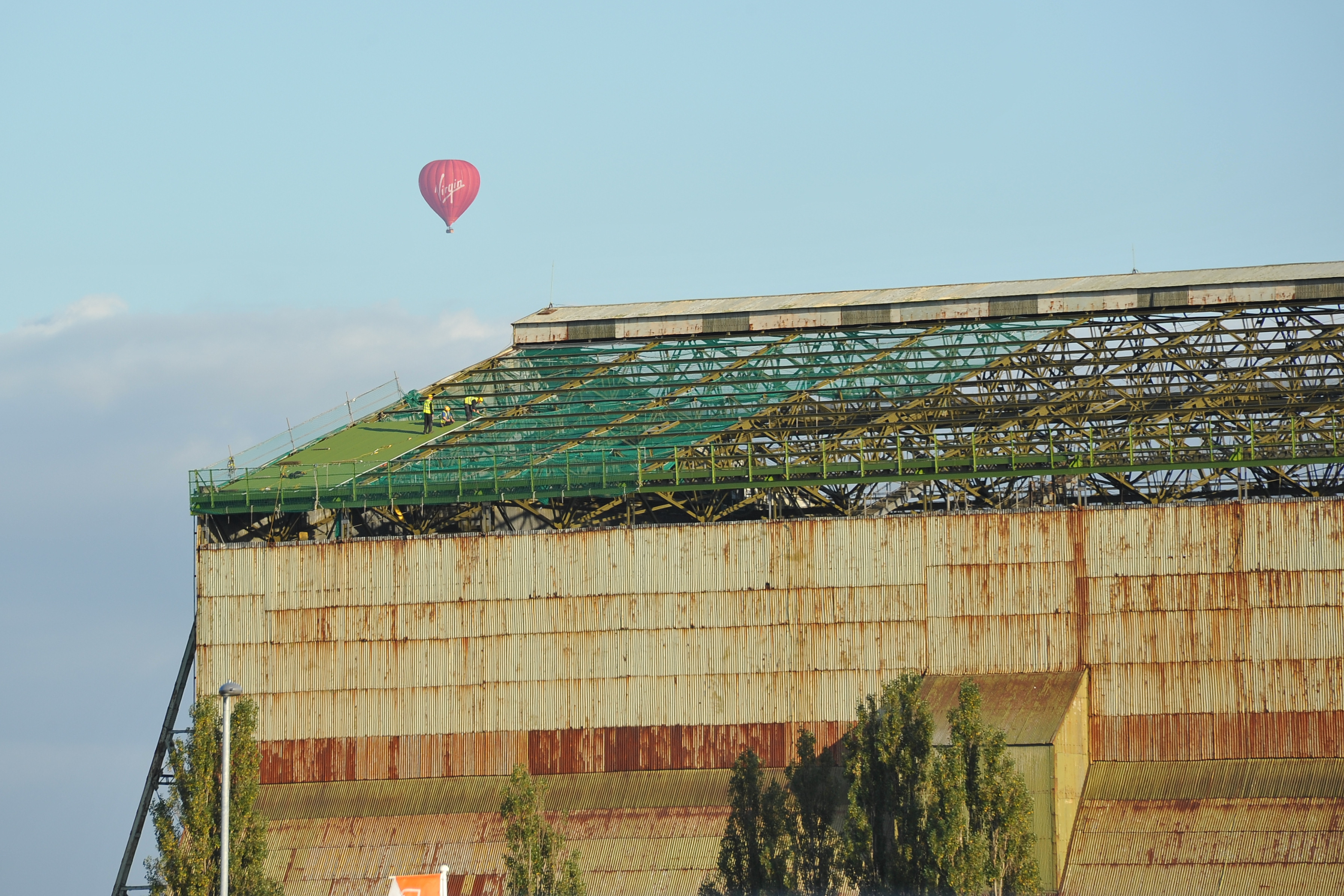
In October 2012 refurbishment work started on Hangar Number 1, with large sections of the roof being replaced.

Both hangars are Grade II* listed. English Heritage deemed Hangar Number 1 at Cardington to be at risk in 2007, needing complete repair and refurbishment. In October 2015 restoration of the hangars was completed and they were unveiled to the public.

== See also ==
- Airship Industries
- List of former Royal Air Force stations
- Hybrid Air Vehicles
- RAF Balloon Command
- Royal Aircraft Establishment
- Met Office

=== Airships ===
- R100
- R101
- Airlander 10
