= AeroLift CycloCrane =

US hybrid airship

CycloCrane
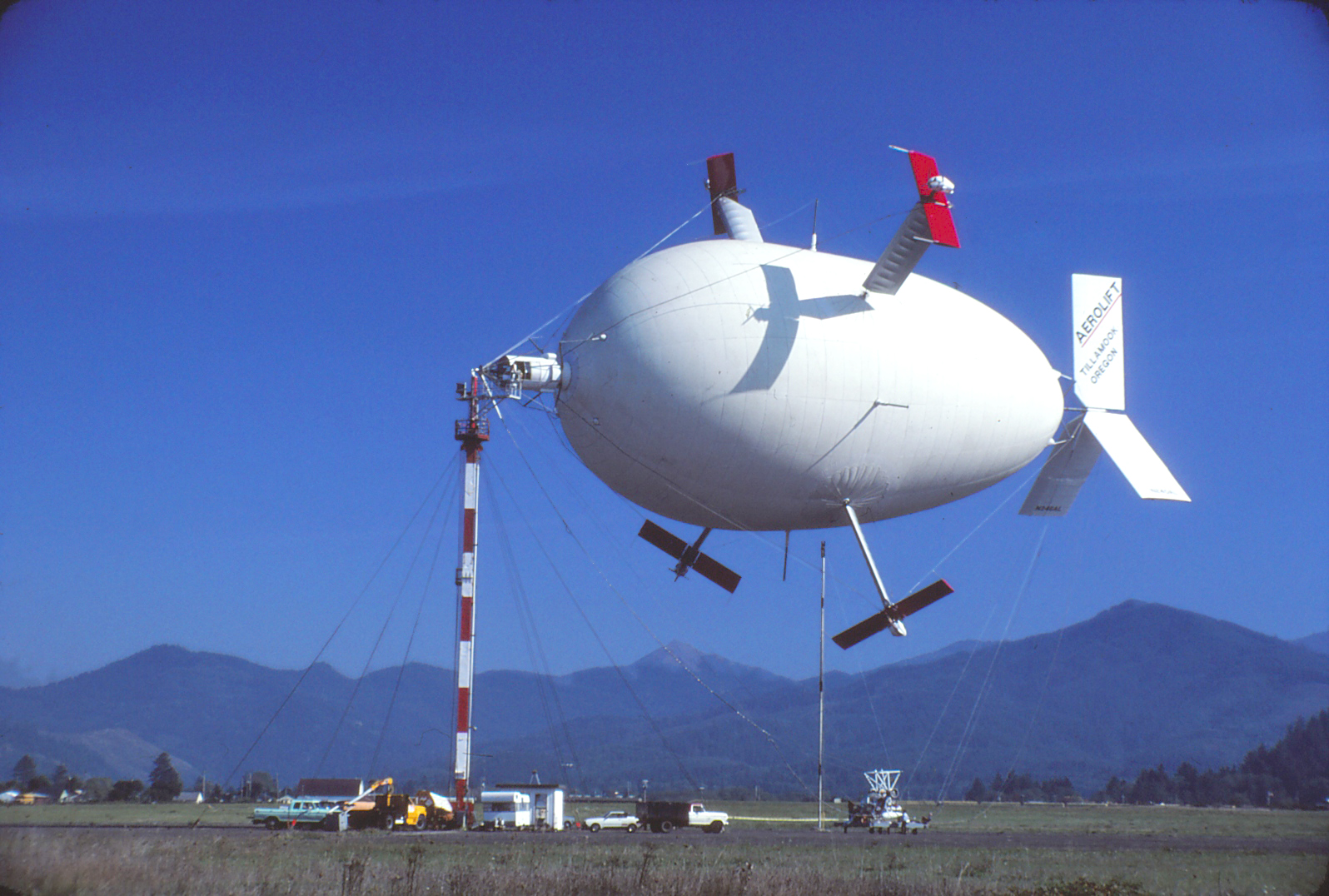
- Cyclocrane hybrid airship undergoing tests in 1982 in Tillamook, Oregon

General information
- Type: Airship for heavy lifting
- National origin: United States
- Manufacturer: AeroLift, Blimp Avenue, Tillamook, Oregon
- Number built: 1

History
- First flight: (crewed) October 15, 1984

The AeroLift CycloCrane was a unique US hybrid airship which adopted helicopter derived airfoil control for low speed flight manoeuvring by spinning on its axis. It was intended to be a heavy load lifter, initially aimed at the Canadian logging industry. A proof of concept vehicle flew at times during the 1980s, but no large production aircraft were built.

== Design and development ==
AeroLift Inc was set up in 1980 by CycloCrane inventor Arthur Crimmins, with funding from five major Canadian logging companies, with the objective of building a hybrid airship capable of conducting aerial logging at remote sites inaccessible by conventional means. The CycloCrane was a most unusual aircraft, utterly unique in its method of three-dimensional drive and attitude control.

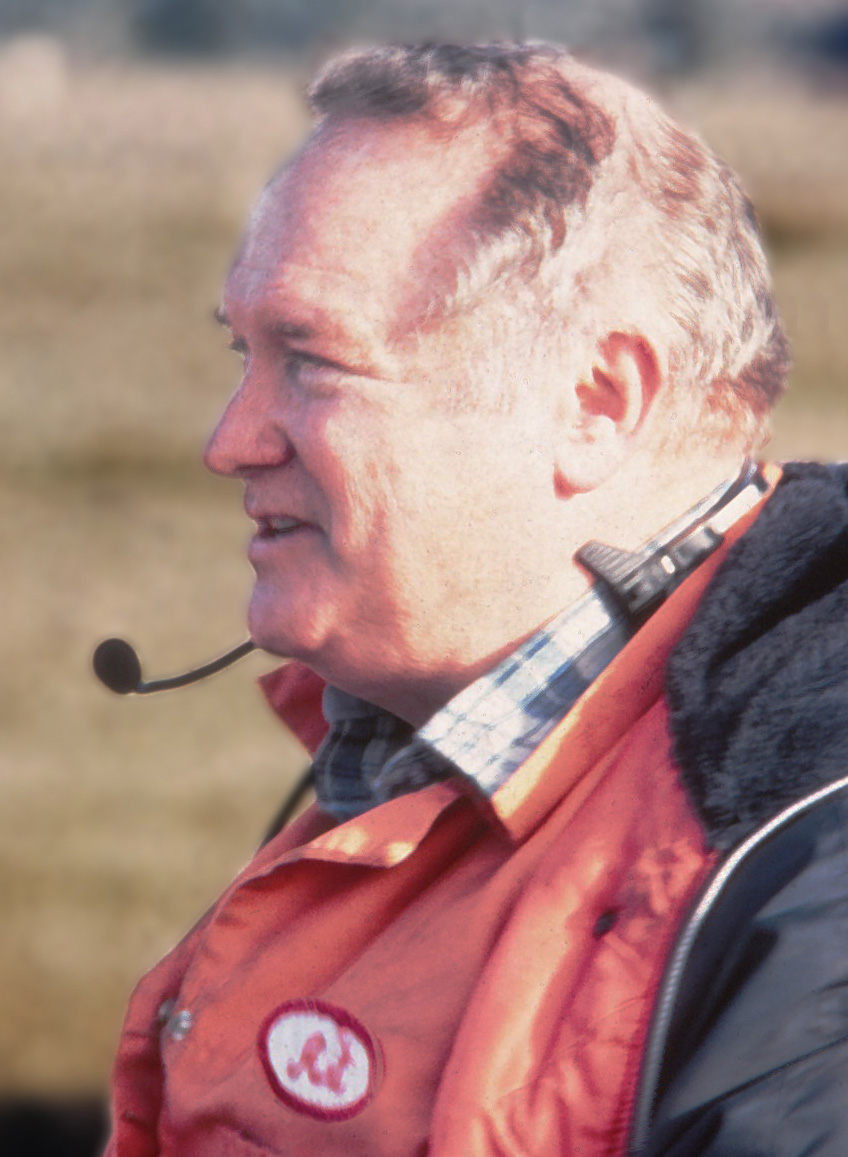
Arthur Crimmins during Cyclocrane flight tests in 1984

Two proof of concept versions were built, identical in size and varying in some details. Each had a fabric, oblate spheroid gas bag, or aerostat, to provide aerostatic lift sufficient to support the aircraft and fifty percent of the payload. Airfoils attached to the structure generated forces used to control the airship and to lift the other half of the load. The aerostat contained a rigid internal axle along its long axis. Halfway along the axle, two long beams were fixed at right angles to it and to each other, passing through the aerostat (envelope) where they carried four wings of symmetric airfoil section, or blades as AeroLift termed them. Each blade carried at its tip another, shorter wing mounted with its long axis perpendicular to the plane of the blade, making a T shape. Aerolift termed the blade and wing assembly a "stalk". The stalks could be rotated from their orientation in hover (wherein the blade surfaces were perpendicular to the long axis of the airship and the eventual direction of flight) toward the direction of flight. At the end of the blades, above the wing, were pylons that carried propeller driving engines, oriented at right angles to both wing and blade long axes, so they powered the aircraft forward in normal flight.

A "hybrid airship" is defined as an airship that employs two forms of lift; aerostatic and aerodynamic, or buoyancy from gas that is lighter than air and lift from aerodynamic surfaces like wings and rotors. In the Cyclocrane the lighter than air gas, which was either helium or a helium and hydrogen mixture, carried the weight of the aircraft, including fluids and crew, and half the payload. The wings on the ends of the blades generated the lift needed to either carry the rest of the payload or to hold the airship down if it was unloaded. In a two-ton slingload Cyclocrane, for example, (which was the nominal size of the proof of concept models) the lifting gas would lift the weight of the vehicle, fluids and crew and one ton of payload. The wings would produce one ton of force to either lift one ton of payload or to hold the ship down against one ton of buoyancy when the payload was released.

Flights began with the airship either attached to the slingload, or tethered, and allowed to rise until the net buoyancy is transferred to the tether or the load. The "stalk" (the assembly the engine is mounted on) that is hanging beneath the aerostat (the gas bag) is pointed forward and the engine started. The other three stalks are oriented with their blades, wings and engine centerlines perpendicular to the long axis of the airship. Once the lower engine is warmed up and running at full power that stalk is quickly rotated ninety degrees. As soon as the stalk begins to point forward the thrust generated by that engine starts the airship center body into rotation. After a revolution or two the other engine (or engines) are started. When the rate of rotation (in the two ton slingload Cyclocrane) reaches thirteen revolutions per minute the relative wind over the wings, is sixty-miles-per-hour. That airspeed is sufficient to create the lift needed to lift one ton, if the airship is loaded, or to hold the ship down against one ton of buoyancy if it isn't.

To fly to his destination the pilot executes a cyclic command to the wings that causes them to change their orientation through each revolution to either lift the load or counteract the aerostatic lift. Once hovering at the desired altitude a collective command is issued by the pilot to the blades, rotating them toward the direction of flight, causing them to function as propeller blades and pulling the airship forward (or backward). This forward velocity component allows for a reduction in the rate of rotation to maintain the necessary sixty-mile-per-hour relative wind over the wings. The result of this mixing of velocity components means that the path that the wings trace through the air as the ship reaches full forward flight is a helix, the rotation rate decreases as the horizontal speed increases and at full forward flight the ship is no longer rotating.

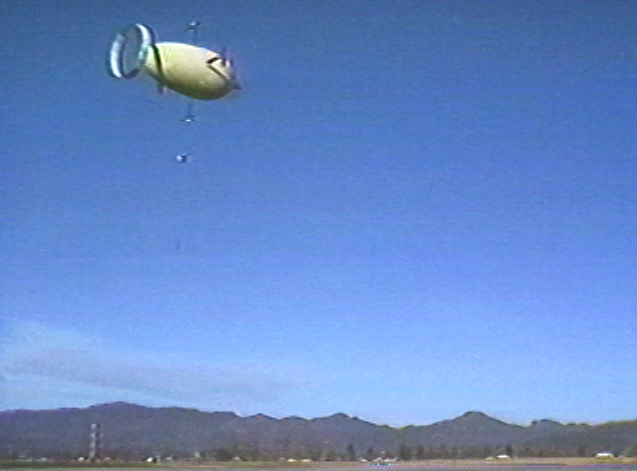
Cyclocrane flight test – 1984 – Pilot Colonel JJ Morris, Flight Engineers Bill Giordano and Arthur Crimmins

To come to a stop so the load can be released or to moor the airship the process is reversed. The stalks are gradually rotated in the opposite direction causing them to act as a propeller again to take the ship back into rotation and hover. The load is then released and the ship can return for another load or if the ship is to be moored it can be secured to a tether or mast.

Both versions of the CycloCrane were 178 ft (54.25 m) long. The first version, completed in 1982 had four piston engines and was fitted with a large, inverted Y-shaped tail needed to stabilise it at its moorings by keeping it pointed into wind. That version was destroyed at its moorings in a storm and was never flown. It was rebuilt by 1984 and fitted with an 18 faceted, ring shaped tail wire braced to the central axis. The aerostats in both versions were 68 ft 0 in (20.73 m) in diameter and 136 ft 0 in (41.45 m) long and manufactured by ILC Dover of Frederica, Delaware, USA. Partly to save weight, this version had only two engines, a pair of 150 hp (112 kW) Textron Lycoming AEIO-320 horizontally opposed piston engines driving 4-bladed propellers. This left the CycloCrane rather underpowered, particularly in lift.

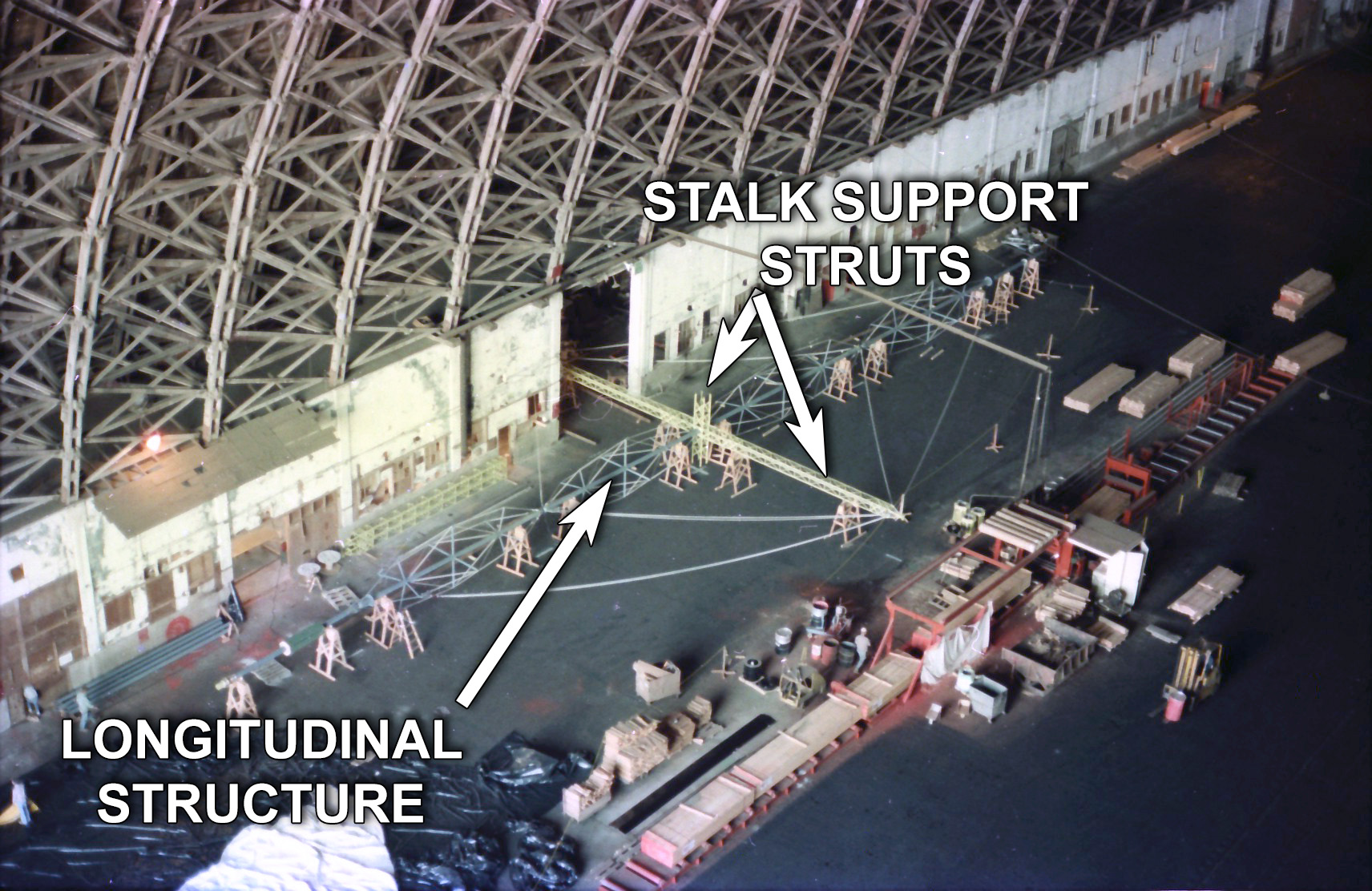
Cyclocrane Internal components including the longitudinal structure and two of four stalk support struts

The revised CycloCrane began uncrewed flights in August 1984 and made its first crewed flight on October 15, 1984 with Colonel JJ Morris as the pilot, Robert Crimmins as co-pilot, Bill Giordano as the flight engineer and Arthur Crimmins as flight engineer and commander. The first untethered flight was made eight days later. By mid-1985 it had accumulated 7 hrs of flight under a US Forest Service contract, but the lack of power limited the spin rate to 10 rpm, rather than the designed 13 rpm so that the aircraft was less nimble in its movements than intended and also only able to lift loads of about half of the target 2 tons. AeroLift received several military contracts in the late 1980s to keep the CycoCrane idea afloat, particularly one from DARPA in 1988 for mooring investigations on a 36 ft model and renewal of the proof of concept aircraft for military suitability tests. For its final flights the tail was altered again into a combination of the early inverted Y within the ring of the first rebuild.

When the defense funding ended in 1990, the company ceased to trade.

== Specifications (proof of concept vehicle, second version) ==
Data from Jane's All the World's Aircraft 1989/90 p.671

General characteristics

- Length: 178 ft 0 in (54.25 m) overall
- Height: 255 ft 0 in (77.72 m) overall, from hook to uppermost engine
- Volume: 330,000 cu ft (9,300 m^{3}) helium volume, notional
- Empty weight: 1,500 lb (680 kg) helium filled buoyant weight
- Powerplant: 2 × Textron Lycoming AEIO-320 4-cylinder horizontally opposed air cooled piston engines, 150 hp (110 kW) each
- Propellers: 4-bladed

== See also ==
Video about the CycloCrane: https://www.youtube.com/watch?v=CiU71GFs4Fs

Related development

- Piasecki PA-97
