= Hybrid Air Vehicles Airlander 10 =

British hybrid airship prototype

Airlander 10
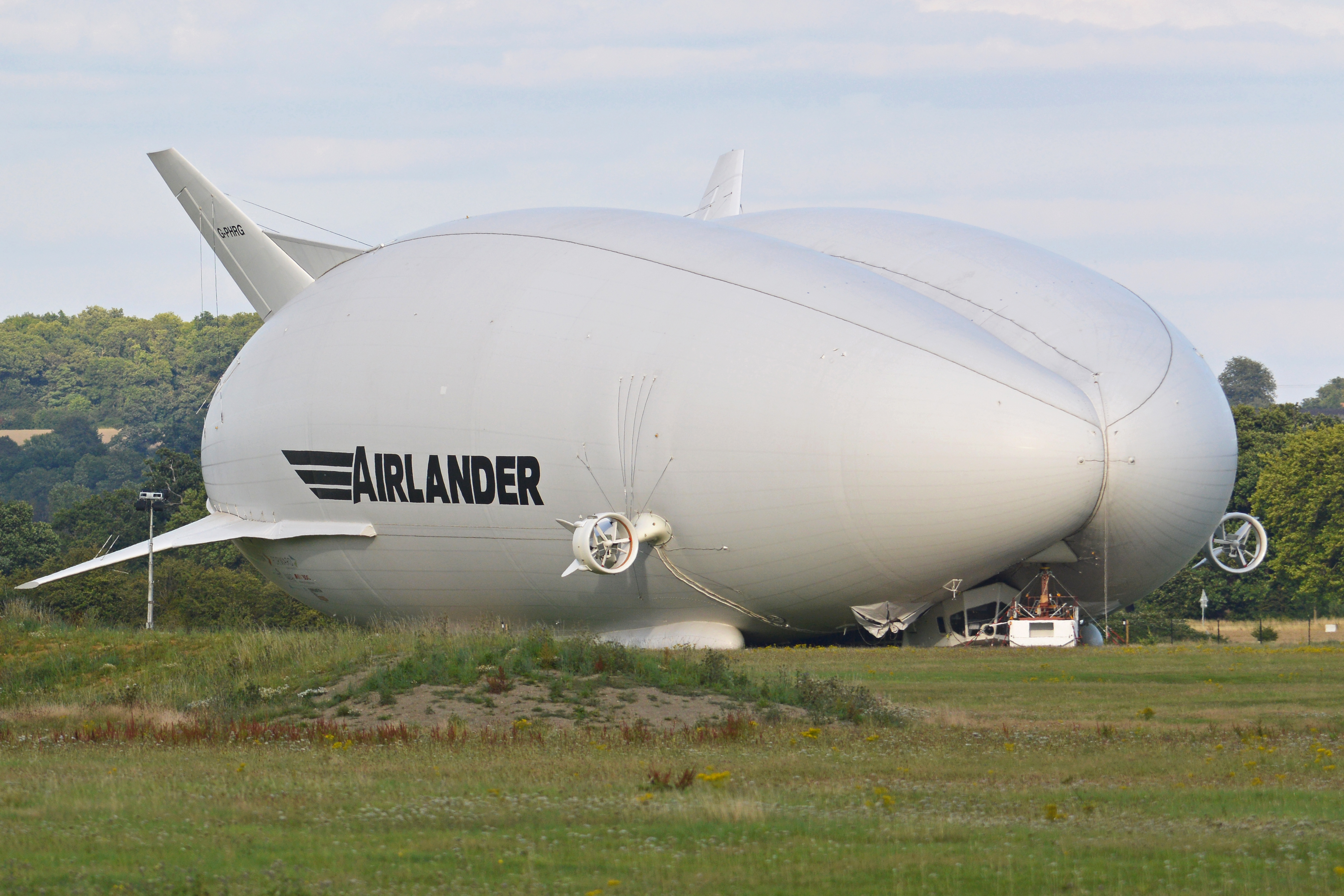
- The Airlander 10 moored at Cardington Airfield on 6 August 2017

General information
- Other names: The Flying Bum; The Flying Buttocks
- Type: Hybrid airship
- National origin: United Kingdom
- Manufacturer: Hybrid Air Vehicles
- Status: Prototype
- Number built: 1

History
- First flight: 7 August 2012 (as HAV 304); 17 August 2016 (as Airlander 10)
- Developed from: HAV 304

The Hybrid Air Vehicles Airlander 10 (originally developed as the HAV 304; nicknamed "The Flying Bum" (Note: Or "The Flying Buttocks") is a hybrid airship designed and built by British manufacturer Hybrid Air Vehicles (HAV). Comprising a helium airship with auxiliary wing and tail surfaces, it flies using both aerostatic and aerodynamic lift and is powered by four diesel engine-driven ducted propellers.

The HAV 304 was originally built for the United States Army's Long Endurance Multi-intelligence Vehicle (LEMV) programme. Its maiden flight took place in 2012 at Lakehurst, New Jersey, in the US. In 2013, the LEMV project was cancelled by the US Army.

HAV reacquired the airship and brought it back to Cardington Airfield in England. It was reassembled and modified for civilian use, and in this form was redesignated the Airlander 10. The modified aircraft completed design certification testing before being written off when it came loose from its moorings in a high wind on 18 November 2017 at Cardington Airfield.

Production of the Airlander 10 has been pushed back multiple times, and deliveries are currently mooted for 2028.

== Development ==
=== HAV 304 and the LEMV requirement ===
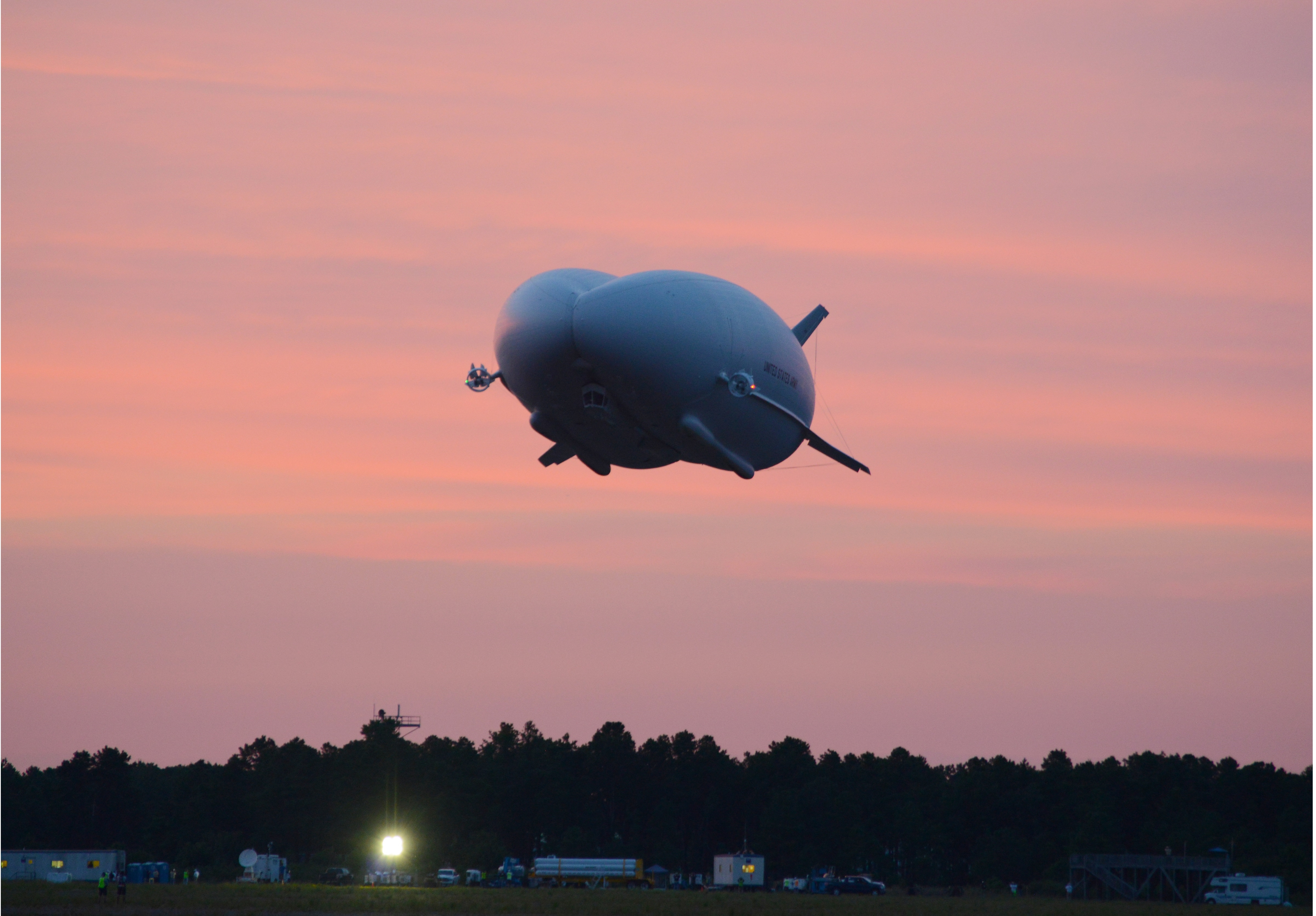
HAV 304 in flight, August 2012

During the 1990s, the UK based company Hybrid Air Vehicles (HAV) formed a partnership with US aerospace and defence company Northrop Grumman to promote the type in defence markets, particularly in the US.

Following the successful demonstration of the HAV-3 small-scale demonstrator, and with Northrop Grumman as the prime bidder, the hybrid airship concept was accepted for the US Long Endurance Multi-intelligence Vehicle (LEMV) project, in preference to the Lockheed Martin P-791 that had also been submitted.

The LEMV programme was intended to demonstrate a medium-altitude long-endurance unmanned aerial vehicle capable of providing Intelligence, surveillance, target acquisition, and reconnaissance (ISTAR) support for ground troops. Besides HAV, UK and US subcontractors included Warwick Mills (fabric engineering and development), ILC Dover (specialised engineering development and manufacturing services), Textron subsidiary AAI Corporation (US Army OneSystem UAV/surveillance aircraft control & information distribution station), Stafford Aero Technologies (flight control systems) and SAIC (full-motion video processing). Northrop Grumman were responsible for the integration of the various electro-optical/infrared, signals intelligence, radar and communications relay payloads onto the airship.

==== Operational requirements ====
Requirements included the capability to operate at six kilometres (20,000 ft) above mean sea level, a 3,000-kilometre (1,900 mi) radius of action, and a 21-day on-station availability, provide up to 16 kilowatts of electrical power for payload, be runway independent and carry several different sensors at the same time. According to the U.S. Army, the LEMV was to have been a recoverable and reusable multi-mission platform. It could be forward located to support extended geostationary operations from austere locations and capable of beyond-line-of-sight command and control. The developmental prototype emerged as the HAV 304, a helium-filled airship with twin conjoined hulls having a total internal capacity of 38,000 m^{3} (1,300,000 cu ft).

With an overall length of 91 metres (299 ft), the airship was longer than any contemporary rivals. However, several mid-20th century airships were longer: for example the German Hindenburg-class airships were 245 metres (804 ft) long. The "largest-ever" non-rigid airship, the U.S. Navy's ZPG-3W 1950s-era military airborne early warning airship, was longer at 123 m (404 ft) and larger with a 42,450-cubic-metre (1,499,000 cu ft) envelope capacity.

Operationally, the LEMV was intended to be typically flown autonomously or as a remotely operated aircraft; for being transported to theatres of operation or within normal civil airspace, the airship can also be flown by onboard operators. According to Northrop's projections, one LEMV could provide the equivalent work of 15 fixed-wing medium-altitude aircraft.

The LEMV was intended to be capable of a wide variety of roles, including enhanced ISR (Intelligence, surveillance and reconnaissance) capabilities, beyond-line-of-sight communications and signals intelligence collection. It would integrate with existing ground station command centres and equipment used by ground troops in forward operating bases, making its data available to multiple users and analysts and reducing the information shortfall during operations.

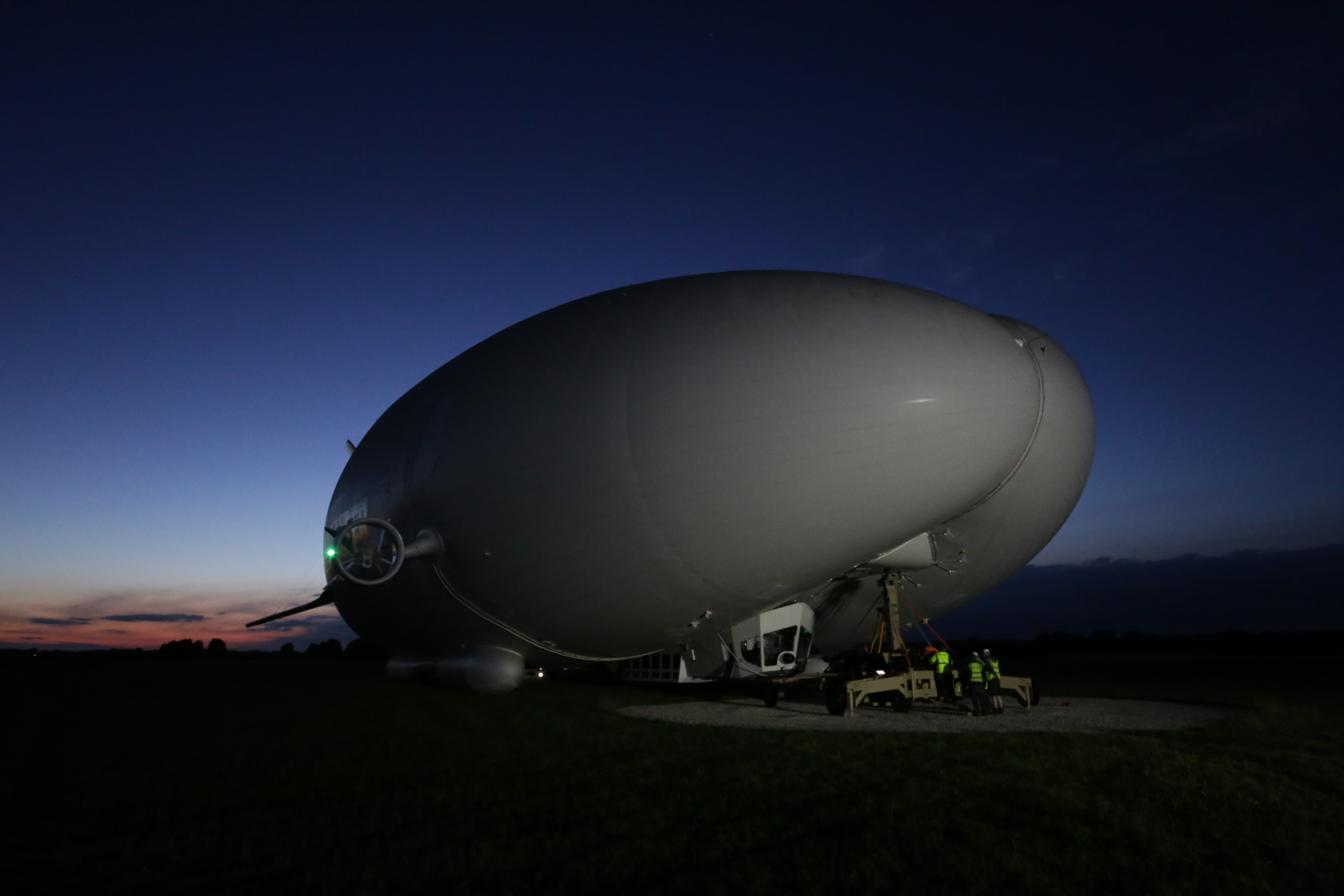
Airlander 10 on the ground, August 2016

The LEMV would be able to operate, like a helicopter, from small forward bases. Its operating cost and endurance were expected to be better than other surveillance options.

The airship could serve as a steady communications relay, ensuring that groups of soldiers in mountainous areas would never lose contact with one another, even if they do not have direct line of sight to each other. The LEMV could have tracked important convoys, key roadways, or other key infrastructure as semi-permanent overwatch escorts, monitor an urban area of interest to prepare for major battles or enforce security, or focus on shutting down border chokepoints. The LEMV would have enabled the American DoD to fly the most technologically advanced payloads in the near term as they became available.

=== Airlander 10 conversion ===
Following cancellation of the LEMV project, the deflated HAV 304 was repurchased by HAV, returned to the UK and hangared at Cardington Airfield. There it was reassembled, refurbished and modified for a more general role; accordingly, the aircraft was no longer an example of the HAV 304 design, having been rebuilt into the Airlander 10 prototype instead. Under HAV's ownership, it gained its nickname of "The Flying Bum" or in American English, "The Flying Buttocks".

The Airlander 10 is designed primarily for civilian use. However it can, like the HAV 304, be fitted for a wide variety of defence roles.

== Design ==
=== Overview ===
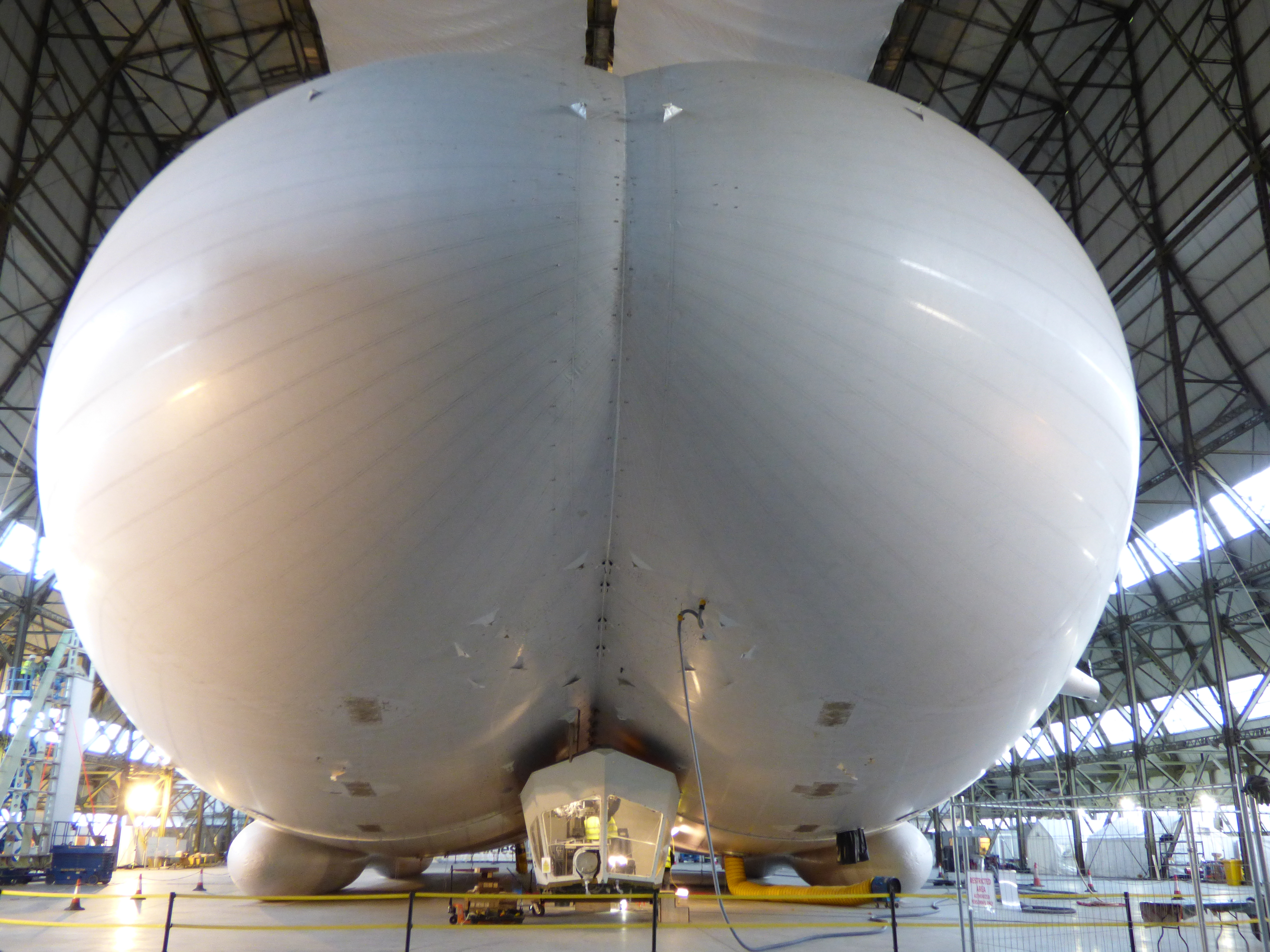
Airlander 10 in Hangar One at Cardington Airfield, January 2016

The HAV 304 / Airlander 10 is a hybrid airship, achieving lift, and thereby flight, via both aerostatic and aerodynamic forces. Unlike most airship designs, it does not have a circular cross-section, having adopted an elliptical shape with a contoured and flattened hull. This shaping is deliberate so that it acts as a lifting body, contributing aerodynamic lift while the airship is in forward motion; generating up to half of the airship's lift in a similar manner to that of a conventional fixed-wing aeroplane. Buoyancy is also provided by helium contained within the envelope, the pressure from which maintains the airship's unique shape, between 60 percent and 80 percent of the aircraft's weight is supported by the lighter-than-air helium. The Airlander 10 is equipped with a set of pneumatic skids that are designed to let the airship land and take off from a wide variety of terrain, as well as from water.

The Airlander 10 is capable of staying aloft for five days while crewed, and over two weeks while unmanned. The type had the potential for various civil and military applications; these include transportation purposes, conducting aerial surveillance, acting as a communications relay, supporting disaster relief operations, and various passenger services such as leisure flights and luxury VIP duties. Many of these duties could involve different configurations of the airship's mission module to suit. Northrop also said the LEMV could be used as a cargo aircraft, claiming that it had enough buoyancy to haul 7 tonnes (7,000 kg; 15,000 lb) of cargo 3,900 km (2,400 mi) at 50 km/h (30 mph). According to HAV, the design would allow operators to choose among trade-offs between endurance and cargo capacity, carrying up to a maximum of 14,000 kg (30,000 lb) of cargo.

=== Flight deck and controls ===
The Airlander 10 possesses a sizeable flight deck with four large floor-to-ceiling windows, providing a high level of external visibility. While the airship had originally been envisioned to be unmanned, HAV adopted an optionally piloted approach as a result of customer interest in such operations. In 2015, positions for a single pilot and an observer had been installed in the Airlander 10; HAV intend to adopt a twin-pilot configuration along with a greater prevalence of glass cockpit-style controls and instrumentation in the future. The airship is controlled by a side-stick mounted on the right-hand side, somewhat resembling that of a rotorcraft; there are no rudder pedals, the side-stick being automatically slaved to the vanes instead. Garmin-built avionics furnish the cockpit; the suite includes a closed-circuit television system that enables the pilot to view the otherwise-distant engines.

The propulsion units and flying surfaces are both connected to the flight control system via fly-by-optics, using optical fibre cables to efficiently cope with the vast scale of the vehicle. The pilot's controls are various switches and potentiometers, which are connected to the flight control system to produce digital signals encoded into light pulses by one of three FCS-Masters and transmitted to the appropriate FCS-Satellite(s) located around the vehicle. These 11 FCS-Satellites then connect electrically to the appropriate equipment including flying surface actuators, engine controls, Secondary Power Distributors etc. Outputs from these various units also take the return path back to the flight deck via the flight control system to provide feedback to the pilot on engine conditions, flying surface positions, Secondary Power conditions etc. Transitioning between the vehicle's multiple modes of flight is regulated directly by the flight control system, enabling the vehicle to be operated locally, remotely or in an unmanned configuration. According to HAV, the designing of the flight control regime was eased by the natural pendulum stability of the airship.

=== Structure ===
The hull of the airship comprises a skin made of triple-layered combination of composite materials. The skin keeps in the gas, and provides rigidity so the craft retains its shape when inflated. The four engines, fins and the flight deck are attached directly upon it. Materials used include Vectran, Kevlar, Tedlar, polyurethane, and Mylar; the Mylar layer, enveloped within polyurethane film layers, forms the airship's gas barrier. The Airlander 10 only has diaphragms and ballonets (see below) as internal framework; weight from the payload module is distributed across every frame via cables running across and into the hull as well. According to HAV's Technical Director Mike Durham, the entirety of the airship's structural strength is derived from being inflated to just above atmospheric pressure with a 4-in water gauge pressure (around 0.15 psi, 1 kPa, or 1% of a standard atmosphere) differential; this strength is due to the diameter of the vessel despite the relatively-low pressure differential.

The hull is internally divided by diaphragms into a total of six main compartments with additional sub-divisions; these divisions can be sealed in the event of emergencies, such as battle damage being sustained, allowing for the majority of the airship's helium, and thereby lift capacity, to be retained. Ballonets are housed within these compartments in order to regulate gas pressure; these are inflated on the ground to increase density and reduce lift. Air and helium are not allowed to mix in the ballonets, thus enabling each to be furnished with valves and fans in order to increase and decrease air volume independently; this approach is claimed by HAV to be unique to the airship.

According to estimates performed by Northrop, the biggest foreseen threat to the HAV 304 is adverse weather conditions, such as high winds or thunderstorms, that could buffet the craft. The threat posed by windy conditions is in part due to its vast surface area in comparison to most aircraft; in particular, ground operations are more difficult in such conditions, but not thought to reach the extent of becoming impossible. According to HAV chief test pilot David Burns, the danger from missiles was relatively low as they can pass through the airship without forcing it down. The skin is reportedly capable of handling small arms fire and other causes of tears due to a level of built-in redundancy and the relatively-low pressure difference between the inside and outside of the hull.

=== Propulsion ===
The Airlander 10 is powered by a total of four Thielert Centurion 325 hp (242 kW) V8 diesel engines which drive sets of three-bladed ducted propellers to provide the thrust for both flight and manoeuvring. These engines are positioned in pairs, one set being located towards the rear of the airship, while the other are positioned alongside the sides of the forward fuselage, mounted on stub wings. Each engine is furnished with a 67 hp (50 kW) generator, which provides electrical power for the airship and its mission systems. The assembly for each of the side-mounted engines can be pivoted 20 degrees in either direction, vectoring the thrust to provide flight control, particularly during landing and taking off; the rear-mounted engines are fixed. By employing thrust vectoring, the engines can direct their thrust downwards to provide additional lift during takeoff. A series of four triangular-shaped variable vanes are positioned behind the engines to provide further control authority by re-directing thrust from the rear engines over the tail fins.

While cruising at altitude, propulsion can be switched to a more efficient electric drive fed from the airship's central generator. Due to the hybrid aerostatic/aerodynamic lift approach, fuel can be expended without entering a state of positive buoyancy that would necessitate routine helium venting in order to land, a costly weakness present upon conventional airships. Fuel is primarily contained within the 12-metre-long (40 ft) main fuel module housing up to nine tons of fuel; the main tank is supplemented by separate rear and forward tanks, containing up to four tonnes (4,000 kg; 8,800 lb). To optimise cruising efficiency, the angle of incidence can be adjusted by pumping fuel between the fore and aft tanks.

== Operational history ==
=== The LEMV project and the HAV 304 ===
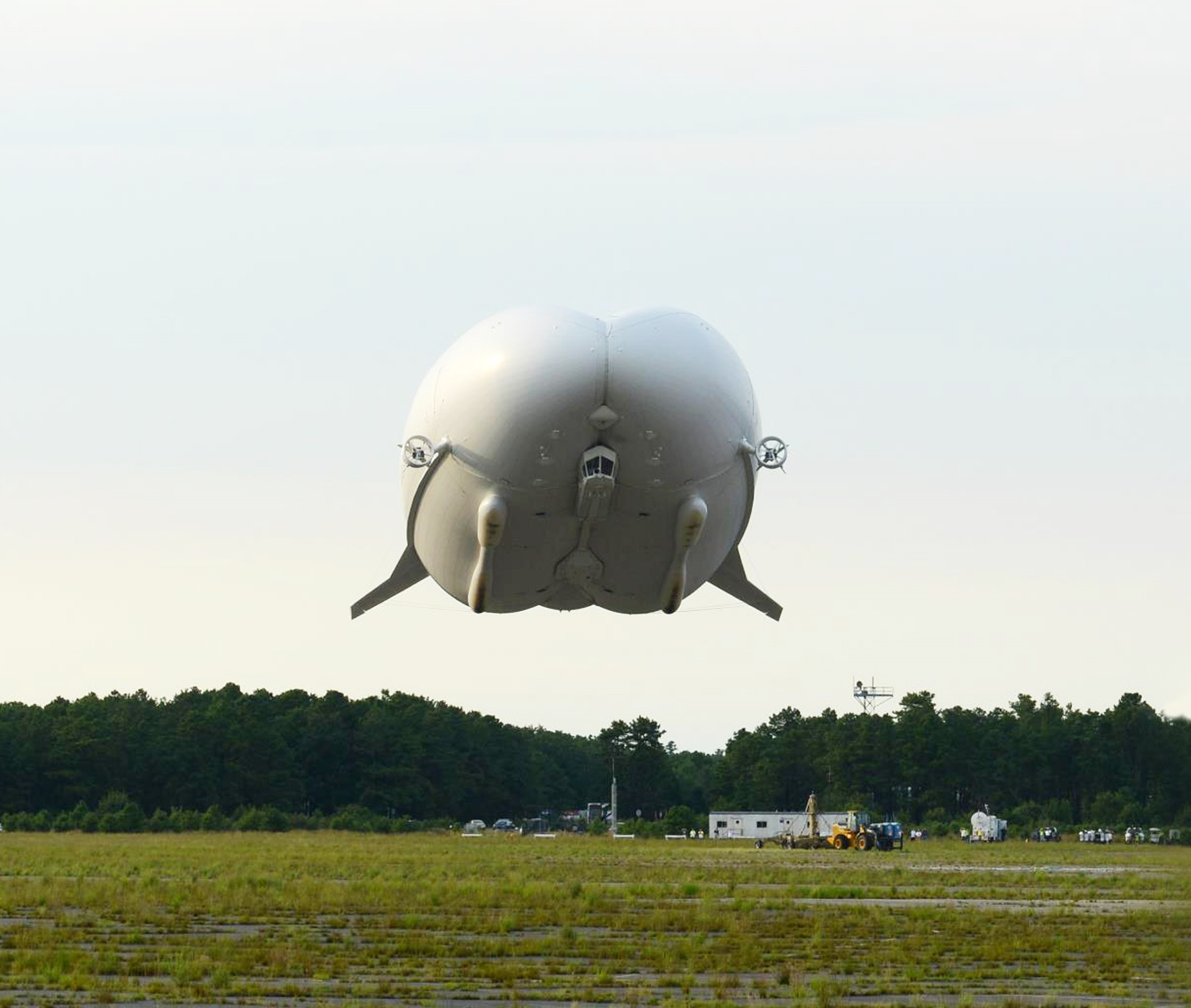
The HAV 304 during its maiden flight in August 2012

On 14 June 2010, the agreement for the development of the project was signed between the US Army Space and Missile Defense Command/Army Forces Strategic Command and Northrop Grumman. The agreement also included options for procuring two additional airships. The timeline for LEMV was an 18-month schedule starting in June 2010 that included vehicle inflation at about month 10. Additional operational characterization would have occurred at Yuma Proving Ground, Arizona, in month 16. The project cost between $154 million and $517 million, dependent on all options. The cost included the design, development, and testing of the airship system within an 18-month time period, followed by transport to Afghanistan for military assessment.

Throughout development, technological challenges and multiple delays were encountered. In October 2011, aerospace publication Flight International reported that the LEMV was scheduled to conduct its first flight in November 2011, three months later than originally planned. According to media reports, the first flight of the LEMV was rescheduled in early June 2012; however, unspecified problems again delayed the flight until August 2012.

The LEMV required at least 300 m (1,000 ft) of runway (violating the runway-independent requirement), and a tether point with a 100 m (300 ft) clear flat area around on which to park, which prevented them from operating at most large bases and all small bases.

On 7 August 2012 the LEMV, carrying US Army registration 09-009, conducted its maiden flight over Joint Base McGuire-Dix-Lakehurst, New Jersey. The flight lasted 90 minutes and was performed with a crew on board, being flown by Chief Test Pilot David Burns. The first flight primary objective was to perform a safe launch and recovery with a secondary objective to verify the flight control system operation. Additional first flight objectives included airworthiness testing and demonstration, and system level performance verification. At this point, the combat deployment of the LEMV to Afghanistan was projected to occur in early 2013.

Two months after the test flight, the US Army stated that it had concerns about sending the airship abroad; these included safety, transportation to the theatre of operations, and the timeline of deployment. The US Army had planned to demonstrate the first LEMV in Afghanistan 18 months after the signing of the contract; at one point, proposals included plans to construct a further five airships following mission completion. In October 2012, the Government Accountability Office (GAO) stated that the LEMV project was 10 months behind schedule due to a combination of factors, including issues with fabric production, foreign components being cleared through customs, and the impact of adverse weather conditions.

On 14 February 2013, the US Army confirmed that it had cancelled the LEMV development effort. In a statement made by a US Army Space and Missile Defense Command spokesperson, the cancellation was a result of technical and performance challenges that had been encountered, as well as resource constraints that had come into effect. Practical and theoretical knowledge gained was redirected from the LEMV to the JLENS program.

=== Reacquisition and the Airlander 10 prototype ===
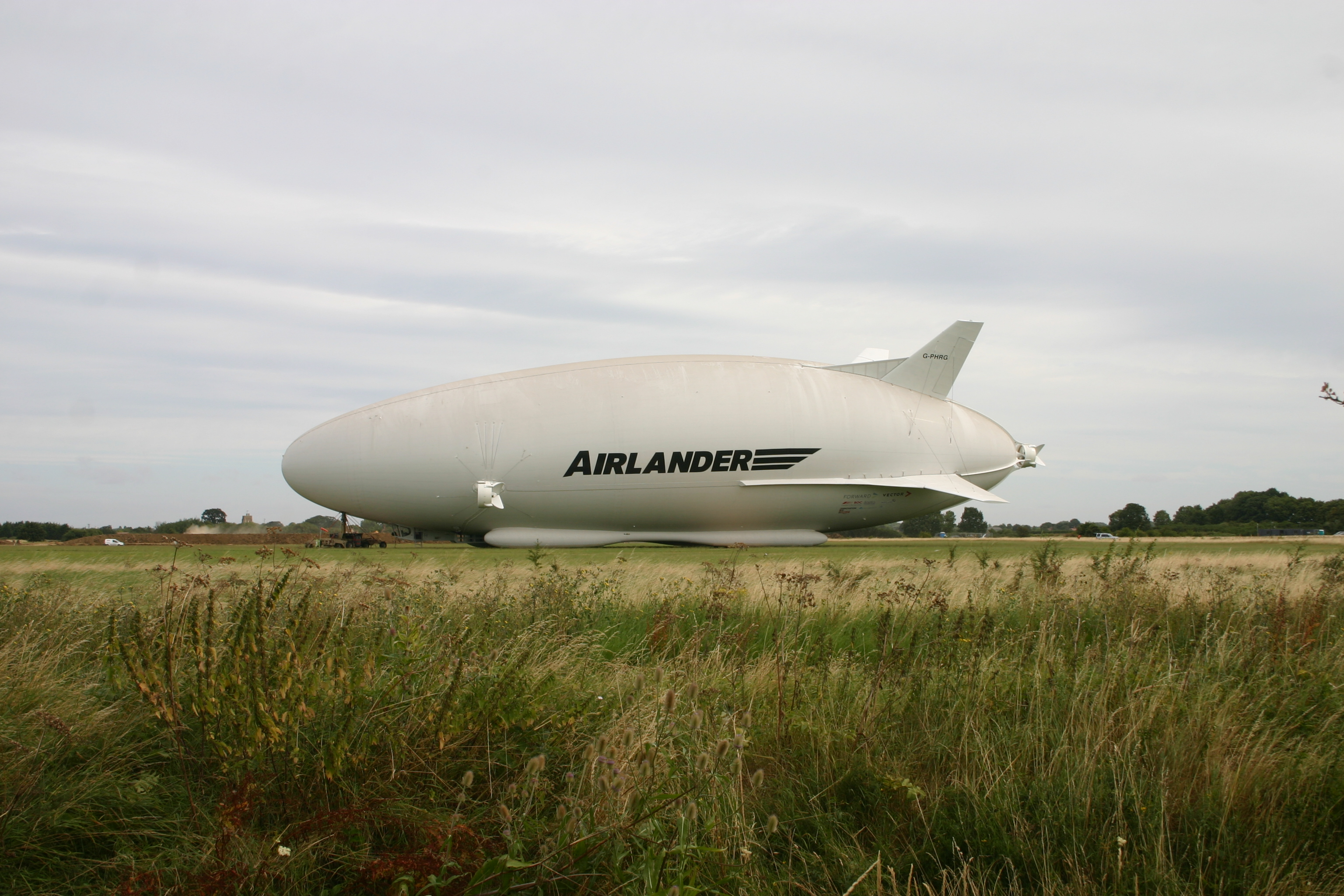
The prototype Airlander 10, G-PHRG Martha Gwyn, in August 2016

The US Army believed that the project's technical data and computer software could be useful for future projects but that selling it would save money. Hybrid Air Vehicles expressed an interest in purchasing the airship, saying they wanted to use it for cold-weather flights and other testing for the development of their proposed "Airlander 50" 50-ton cargo airship. The HAV offer included the basic avionics, mooring masts and spare engines but not the specialist equipment or helium. With this the only offer on the table, in September 2013 the Pentagon sold the LEMV airship back to HAV for $301,000.

The deflated airship was returned to the UK, where it underwent reassembly and modification as the Airlander 10 prototype at Cardington Airfield. In April 2014, HAV announced that it was forming an industry team with Selex ES and QinetiQ to develop and demonstrate the sensor capabilities of the Airlander 10, and that a three-month demonstration period for the UK's Ministry of Defence has been planned. One suggested use is as a mother ship for launching multiple UAVs.

In April 2014, it was announced that both the European Aviation Safety Agency (EASA) and the UK's Civil Aviation Authority (CAA) had approved the necessary permissions for Airlander 10 to return to flight. At one point, HAV had intended for the airship to have completed reassembly and be ready for test flights by December 2014; however, delays were encountered while additional financing from commercial and government entities was being sought. The project received both UK and EU funding to support the airship's further development, totalling £7 million by March 2016. Crowdfunding from members of the general public also raised £2.1 million.

Re-registered as G-PHRG, on 21 March 2016 the fully assembled Airlander 10 was publicly unveiled; at this point, HAV announced that the type would be offered for both civil and military use in the future. The Airlander 10 is also to serve as a prototype for an even larger version of the airship, referred to as the Airlander 50. According to reports, several military customers have shown interest in potential uses for the type, including in a projected unmanned configuration. Named the Martha Gwyn after the company chairman's wife, the airship has become popularly known as "the flying bum" for "the resemblance its plump front end shares with a human's back end."

On 17 August 2016, the first test flight took place at the aircraft's home base, Cardington Airfield in Bedfordshire, England, and lasted 30 minutes. During the final approach to its mooring mast at the end of its second test flight on 24 August 2016, the airship's mooring rope became entangled in wires and the nose hit the ground, damaging the cockpit. The crew were unharmed.

The Airlander 10 was repaired and fitted with inflatable "feet" designed to be deployable in 15 seconds, to protect the cockpit in an emergency landing. It resumed flight testing on 10 May 2017. On 13 June 2017, during its fourth test flight, the Airlander reached an altitude of 3,500 feet (1,070 m).

On 18 November 2017, the airship broke free from its moorings in a high wind, automatically pulling a safety rip panel so that it deflated and fell to the ground. Two people received minor injuries. In January 2019, it was announced that the aircraft had enabled sufficient data to be gathered to complete its test and certification programme, and would be retired.

== Airlander 10 production version ==
Following the prototype tests flights, the Airlander 10 received CAA Production Organisation Approval and EASA Design Organisation Approval.

As of January 2020 the company is planning to manufacture a batch of certified, production standard Airlander 10 hybrid airships. Compared to the prototype they are planned to feature reduced aerodynamic drag, improved landing gear and a larger payload cabin. HAV estimate the CO_{2} footprint per passenger on Airlander 10 will be about 9 g/km or 4.5 kg, compared with about 53 kg per passenger on a jet plane.

In February 2022 it was reported that production of the Airlander would be moved to South Yorkshire.

In December 2024 the South Yorkshire Mayoral Combined Authority released the first instalment of a £7m loan, prompting the start of initial survey and site work for a manufacturing facility at a 50 hectare site at Carcroft Common, Doncaster. The facility is expected to have a production capacity of 10 units per year.

=== Orders and reservations ===
In June 2022, Spanish airline Air Nostrum announced that they had placed a reservation for ten airships, with delivery scheduled for 2026. The order was doubled to twenty airships in August 2023.

In October 2025 it was announced that Airlander had received its first military reservations from an unamed defence contractor.

== Technical specifications ==
=== HAV 304 ===
- Length: 91 m (298 ft 7 in)
- Width: 34 m (111 ft 7 in)
- Height: 26 m (85 ft 4 in)
- Envelope: 38,000 m^{3} (1,300,000 cu ft)
- Engines: four × 350 hp (260 kW), 4 L supercharged V8 diesel

=== Airlander 10 ===
Data from Hybrid Air Vehicles

General characteristics

- Capacity:
  - 100 passengers / 10,000 kg (22,050 lb) at 2,000 nmi range
  - 130 passengers / 13,000 kg (28,660 lb) at reduced range
- Length: 98 m (321 ft 6 in)
- Wingspan: 50 m (164 ft 0 in)
- Height: 30 m (98 ft 5 in)
- Volume: 38,000 m^{3} (1,340,000 cu ft)
- Gross weight: 20,000 kg (44,100 lb)
- Max takeoff weight: 33,285 kg (73,381 lb)
- Powerplant: 4 × 4 litre V8 turbocharged diesel engines, 242 kW (325 hp) each

Performance

- Maximum speed: 130 km/h (81 mph, 70 kn)
- Cruise speed: 102 km/h (63 mph, 55 kn)
- Range: 3,700 km (2,300 mi, 2,000 nmi)
- Ferry range: 7,400 km (4,600 mi, 4,000 nmi)
- Endurance: 5 days manned
- Service ceiling: 3,000 m (10,000 ft) , 20,000 feet maximum with reduced payload
  Loiter speed 20 knots (37 km/h)

== See also ==
- Lockheed Martin P-791
- Wide-area motion imagery
