= SkyHook JHL-40 =

Hybrid airship/helicopter proposed in 2008

- Artist's conception of Skyhook in operation

General information
- Type: Heavy lifter
- National origin: Canada / United States
- Manufacturer: Boeing
- Status: Proposed

The SkyHook JHL-40 was a proposed hybrid airship/helicopter. On July 9, 2008, Boeing announced that it had teamed up with SkyHook International, a Canadian company, to develop this aircraft.

According to company spokespeople, the aircraft would combine the best features of a blimp and a helicopter, and would be capable of carrying a 40 ton load up to 200 miles (320 km) without refueling. At 302 feet (92 m) long, it would classify as the largest helicopter in the world, and would be capable of flying up to 800 miles (1,300 km) without a load. The craft would use helium to provide enough lift to carry its own weight, and would use four helicopter rotors to lift the load and to propel the aircraft. By using both helium and helicopter rotors, the aircraft can avoid having to jettison helium after unloading.

In comparison, the CH-47 Chinook helicopter can carry a load the same distance, but can only lift a maximum of 10 tons.

SkyHook claimed that the aircraft would provide environmental benefits over traditional methods of delivering heavy loads, as it would require less fuel than a helicopter and not require building big roads for construction equipment.

The JHL-40, or Jess Heavy Lifter, is named after Pete Jess, the president and chief operating officer of SkyHook International, the company that owns the patent for the aircraft.

The planned aircraft was never certified by Transport Canada or the U.S. Federal Aviation Administration. The aircraft's overall performance and layout were established. The next major program milestone, never reached, was to be a detailed design in 2011, which would have centered on the design, analysis and specification of all hardware, software and related aircraft and ground support systems interfaces. Boeing planned to design and fabricate a production SkyHook HLV prototype at its Rotorcraft Systems facility in Ridley Park, Pennsylvania. The first SkyHook HLV aircraft was scheduled to fly in 2014. On September 13, 2010 however, Financial Times Deutschland revealed that development was halted until an infusion of 100 million dollars in public funding would be available.

== See also ==
Aircraft of comparable role, configuration, and era

- Piasecki PA-97 Helistat
- Cargolifter
