= Cardington test =

Fire tests conducted in England in the 1990s

The Cardington Fire Tests were a series of large-scale fire tests conducted in real structures (wood, steel-concrete composite, and concrete) at the BRE Cardington facility near Cardington, Bedfordshire, England, during the mid-1990s. After the tests, extensive computational and analytical studies of the behaviour of steel-framed composite structures in fire conditions were carried out by, among others, the University of Edinburgh, Sheffield University, and Imperial College London.

The results were presented in the form of a main report, which identified the main findings, together with numerous supplementary reports exploring various phenomena in detail.
