= Thermoplan =

ALA-40 Thermoplan

General information
- Type: Experimental hybrid airship
- Manufacturer: Ulyanovsk Aviation Production Complex in cooperation with Design Bureau "Thermoplan"
- Designer: Yury G. Ishkov
- Status: destroyed in a ground accident
- Number built: 1

History
- First flight: 1992 (towing mode)

External image
- Towing of the ALA-40 prototype (1992)

The Thermoplan is a given name of the prototype of Russian lenticular-shaped hybrid airship.

== Design features ==
The key feature of Thermoplan is its combined structure with primary section having a torus of revolution shape (one variant was to construct this section hermetic and fill with helium instead of the shell helium section). This section supports the shell which has two sections one filled with helium and second with air that can be heated by the airship engines exhaust gas or cooled naturally. This design, based on the concept of a "rozière", greatly improves the manoeuvrability compared to an all-helium type. The disc shape is also intended to improve manoeuvrability and to help resist winds up to 20 m/s (45 mph; 39 kn; 72 km/h).

Shell volume was 10660 cu. m. (376 450 cu. ft.) with its diameter of 40 m. The prototype had 2 Klimov GTD-350 engines (with 400 h.p. each), 1 Vedeneyev M14P motor (360 h.p.) and 2 electric power unit for vertical propulsion (50 h.p. each). Flight crew was 2 pilots.

== Project history ==
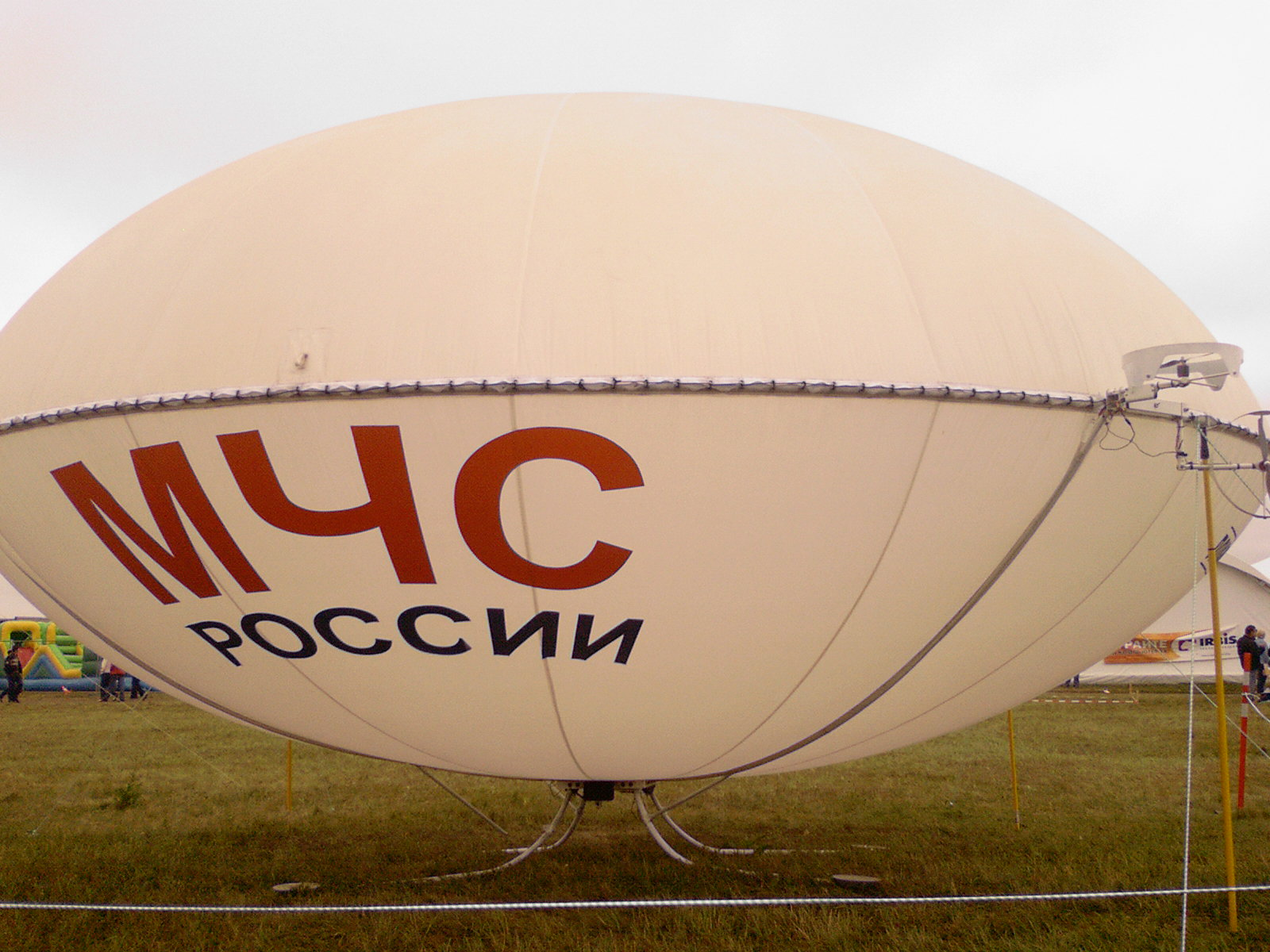
Testing model of a lenticular-shaped hybrid airship for monitoring emergency areas (2009)

The project was started in the late 1970s in the Moscow Aviation Institute by a small team of students led by Yury Ishkov under scientific direction of Sergey Eger. In the second half of 1980s with a help of then MAI rector Yuri Ryzhov they obtained support from Gazprom for the start-up Design Bureau "Thermpolan" and first scaled prototype ALA-40 was constructed at the Ulyanovsk Aviation Production Complex and rolled-out in 1992. That was a rather small airship, and a full-scale model was not built at that time due to the economic crisis of the 1990s in the USSR.

In the late 2000s there was an attempt to revive this project under the new name Locomoskyner by the Russian company Lokomosky in Ulyanovsk. However, this was not successful and the programme was cancelled.

== See also ==
- EKIP
- Lockheed Martin P-791
