= Hybrid Air Vehicles =

British manufacturer of hybrid airships

- Type: Limited
- Industry: Aviation
- Predecessor: SkyCat Group Ltd
- Founded: 2007; 19 years ago
- Founder: Roger Munk
- Headquarters: Ampthill Road, Bedford, United Kingdom
- Area served: Worldwide
- Key people: Sam Macleod (Chairman); Tom Grundy (Chief Executive)
- Products: Airlander 10
- Website: www.hybridairvehicles.com

Hybrid Air Vehicles (HAV) Limited is a British limited company and a British manufacturer of hybrid airships, though none have been built since the crash of its last demonstrator in Nov 2017. These aircraft use both aerodynamics and lighter-than-air (LTA) technology to generate lift, potentially allowing the vehicle to stay aloft for several weeks.

The company developed the HAV 3 technology demonstrator. This won it the US Army LEMV contract, in association with Northrop Grumman as the prime contractor, and led to the HAV 304. Following termination of the LEMV project, the HAV 304 was rebuilt as the Airlander 10. It was the largest aircraft flying at the time. The Airlander 10 was damaged in one event in 2016 and then written off after another event at the mast in 2017. The company has stated that it will not be rebuilt.

== History ==
=== Origins ===
HAV is the latest in a line of companies to acquire and develop airship technologies in the UK. Aerospace Developments was formed in 1971 and since then its assets have passed through successive companies Airship Developments, Airship Industries, Westinghouse Airships, Airship Technologies, Advanced Technologies Group (ATG) and, immediately preceding HAV, the SkyCat group which folded in 2007.

During this period a number of airships and hybrids were built.

=== Multi-hull airships ===
Hybrid Air Vehicles was formed in 2007 by Roger Munk (Jeffrey Roger Munk 1947–2010). It acquired the assets of the SkyCat group and established itself at Cardington Airfield, Bedfordshire, UK.

The company developed the HAV 3 technology demonstrator. In partnership with Northrop Grumman (NGC) as prime contractor, in 2009 it won a US$500 million US Army contract to develop a Long Endurance Multi-intelligence Vehicle (LEMV), which was delivered between 2009 and early 2013. Hybrid Air Vehicles designed, developed and manufactured the HAV 304 aircraft for the LEMV project, with NGC acting as the prime contractor and sensor system integrator. On 7 August 2012 a successful 90-minute test flight took place in Lakehurst, New Jersey. The LEMV project was cancelled In February 2013.

Hybrid Air Vehicles took the opportunity to buy back the envelope and associated materials, which they returned to the UK for conversion to the civilian Airlander 10. In 2014 it was unveiled in Cardington. It was reported as the world's largest aircraft.

One investor, heavy metal singer and commercial pilot Bruce Dickinson, announced plans to fly twice around the world nonstop.

== Aircraft ==
The HAV-3 scale demonstrator

=== HAV-3 ===
The HAV-3 craft was a 50 feet (15 m) long remote-controlled scale demonstrator based on the SkyCat concept.

Registered as G-OHAV (company serial HAV-3/001) it was built in 2008. Its first flight was in September 2008 at Cardington Airfield.

It was retired in 2010 following receipt of the LEMV contract.

=== HAV-304 LEMV and Airlander 10 ===
The HAV 304 was developed for the US military LEMV project.

Following cancellation of the LEMV project, HAV bought back the HAV 304, returned it to the UK and converted it for civilian use as the Airlander 10. Airlander 10 is 92 metres (302 ft) long, 44 metres (144 ft) wide, and 26 metres (85 ft) high. The Airlander 10 landed nose-down on 24 August 2016 during its second test flight on the Cardington airfield in Bedfordshire, causing damage to the cockpit. Repairs were completed by February the following year, and the Airlander recommenced its flight test programme on 10 May 2017. On 18 November 2017, the airship broke free from its moorings in a high wind and fell to the ground. The craft was written off after this incident.

=== Airlander 50 ===
The Airlander 50 is a proposed larger transport craft with a 50 tonne payload.
