= Piasecki PA-97 Helistat =

Experimental helicopter/airship by Piasecki Aircraft

PA-97 Helistat
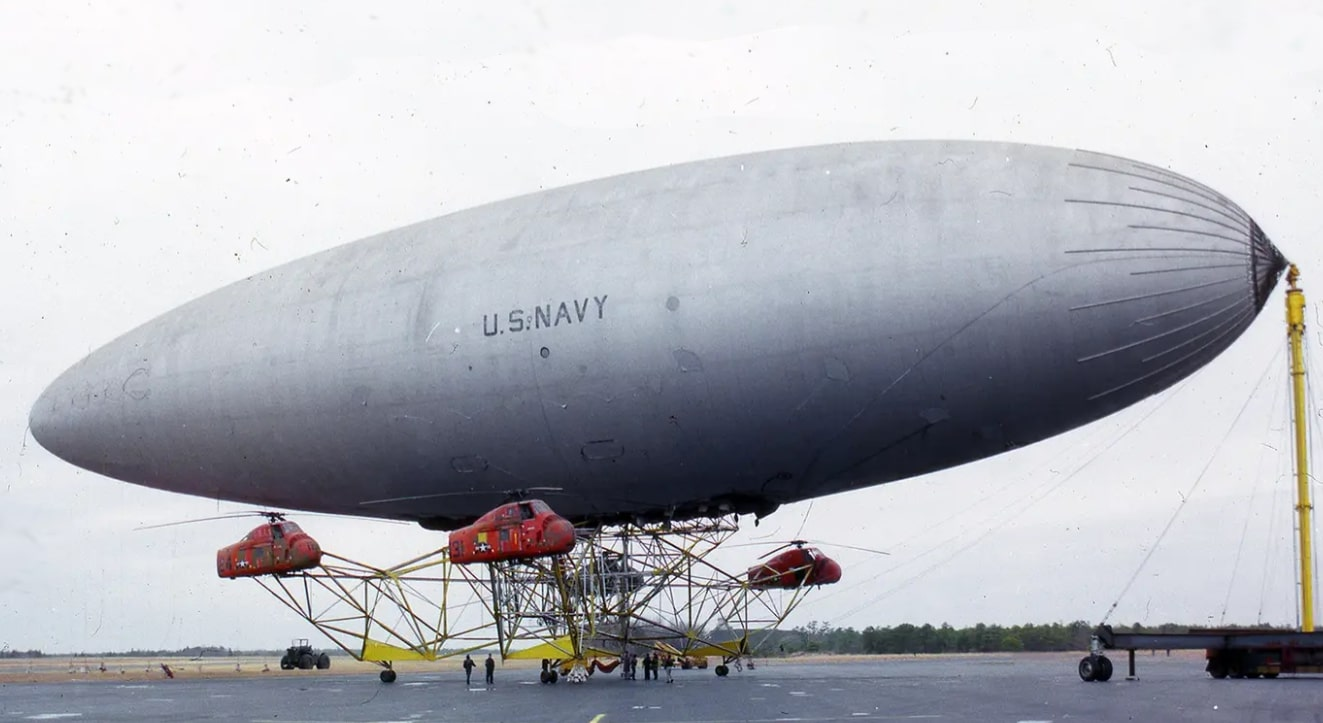

General information
- Type: Experimental heavy-lifter
- Manufacturer: Piasecki Aircraft
- Number built: 1

History
- First flight: 26 April 1986
- Retired: Destroyed in crash on 1 July 1986
- Developed from: N class blimp Sikorsky H-34

The Piasecki PA-97 Helistat was an American experimental heavy-lift aircraft, built by Piasecki by fastening four H-34J helicopters to a framework beneath a helium-inflated blimp envelope. The sole prototype was destroyed during a test flight, killing a test pilot and injuring another four in the course of a single incident.

== Design and development ==
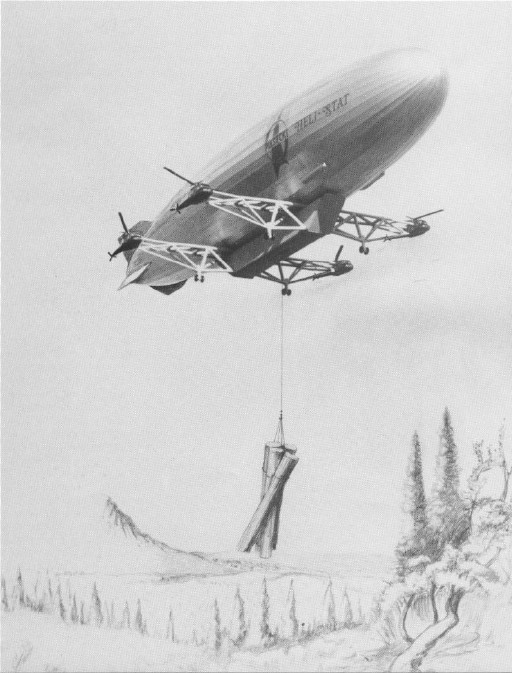
Artist's conception of the Heli-Stat in service

=== Helistat design concept ===
The Helistat concept was to augment the helicopters' dynamic lift with the static lift of an air buoyancy envelope. This would give greater maximum lift capability for heavy-lift work. At low weights (i.e. traveling to site without a payload) it would also free up the helicopters' rotor thrust for forward thrust, requiring less dynamic lift and lower fuel burn.

To maintain coincidence of the dynamic and static lifts (otherwise the envelope would pitch as helicopter power increased), it is impractical to use a single helicopter rotor, so multiple rotors are arranged around the center of buoyancy of the envelope.

Differential changes to the collective pitch (i.e. thrust) of the rotors gives powerful control forces. Propulsion and retardation are obtained from the cyclic tilt of the rotors, as for a normal helicopter. Yaw moments are produced by the differential cyclic tilting of the rotors (i.e. one side forward, the other back). In forward flight, the ruddervators at the tail of the blimp also add their pitch and yaw control moments.

=== PA-97 prototype ===
The PA-97 was built under a 1980 U.S. Navy contract for the Forest Service to demonstrate a heavy vertical airlifter for harvesting timber from inaccessible terrain. The single demonstrator used a retired Navy ZPG-2W blimp envelope and four Sikorsky H-34J helicopters. The combination of a large blimp with powered lift made the 343 foot (104.57 m) long helistat the largest dynamic lift aircraft in the world.

The helicopters used were aged examples of a long-established design. Their tail rotors were removed, their fuselages shortened and they were attached to a crude tubular aluminum framework beneath the helium-filled envelope. Four freely-castering twin-wheel bogies beneath the framework provided the undercarriage. Criticism has been expressed of the structural qualities and stress analysis of this framework.

Test flights were made from the Naval Air Engineering Station Lakehurst in New Jersey, making use of the long-established hangars for handling large airships. First flight was on 26 April 1986.

On 1 July 1986, the PA-97 crashed immediately after liftoff on a test flight, killing one of the pilots. A gust of wind from the rear of the aircraft induced some movement across the ramp. The undercarriage responded badly to this, the bogies shimmying uncontrollably. Vibration in the framework then coupled with a helicopter phenomenon known as ground resonance. The vibration was sufficient to cause a structural failure as the starboard rear helicopter broke off its mounting, its rotors cutting into the gasbag. The unbalanced lift then made the vibrations worse and the remaining three helicopters broke free.

== Specifications ==
General characteristics

- Crew: 4
- Capacity: 8 seats, including pilot
- Length: 343 ft 0 in (104.57 m)
- Diameter: 76 ft 0 in (23.17 m)
- Volume: 1,011,000 cu ft (28,628.33 m^{3})
- Gross weight: 111,917 lb (50,765 kg)
- Powerplant: 4 × Wright R-1820-84C reciprocating, 1,380 hp (1,030 kW) each

Performance

== See also ==
Related development

- AeroLift CycloCrane
- ZPG-2W blimp
- EosXi

Aircraft of comparable role, configuration, and era

- SkyHook JHL-40
- Cargolifter

Related lists

- List of airship accidents
