= Nimbus EosXi =

Italian unmanned hybrid airship

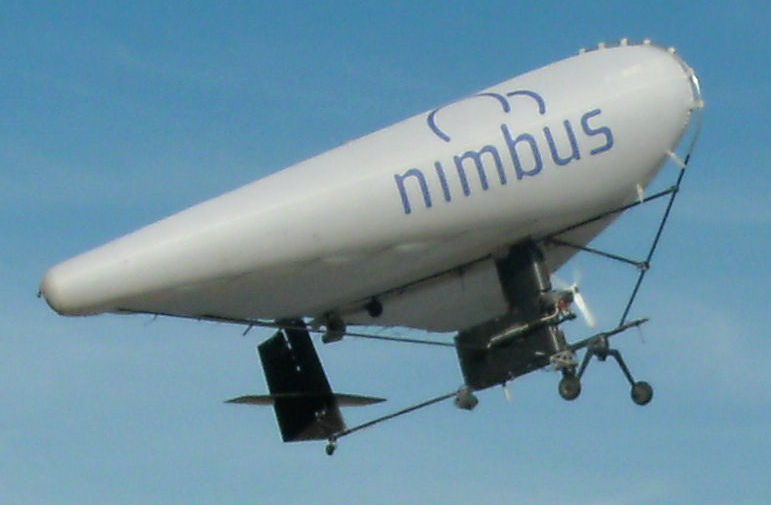
EosXi in flight

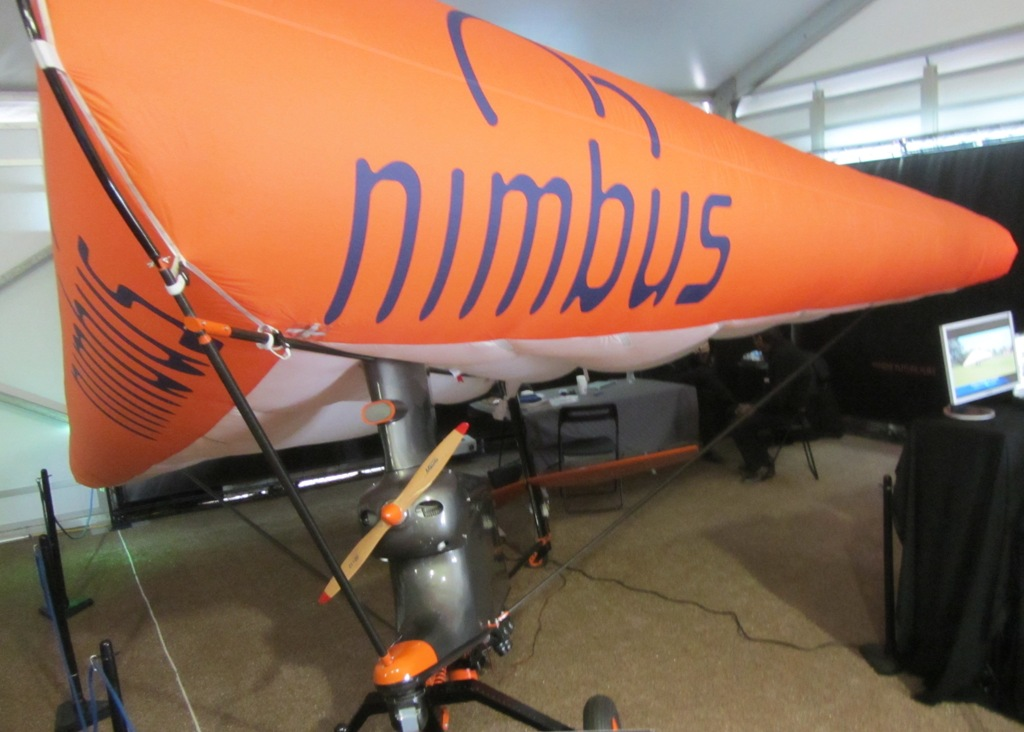
EosXi

The Nimbus EosXi is an Italian unmanned aerial vehicle (UAV) designed for civilian use, developed and manufactured by NIMBUS Srl.

EOS XI is a hybrid airship having a large, gas-filled delta wing which provides both aerostatic and aerodynamic lift, referred to by the manufacturer as a "metaplane". The cabin, tail assembly and propulsion system are suspended below the wing.

== Description ==
Although classified as an aerodyne (an aircraft heavier than air), the additional aerostatic lift allows extremely short take-off and landing (STOL) distances. Unlike conventional aircraft, which use adjustable control surfaces known as ailerons to maneuver in flight, the EosXi wing is a stiff structure with no moving parts. The craft uses only the suspended tail assembly's moveable planes for course and attitude control, relying on the wing's aerostatic lift to enhance stability. The large wing has a low wing loading that contributes to the vehicle's STOL characteristics.

The wing envelope has a multi-layer construction to obtain the required lightness, strength and aerodynamic characteristics.

The EosXi is claimed to have exceptional stability, due to its low centre of gravity, while the moveable tail surfaces are claimed to give high maneuverability. The delta wing is claimed to allow stable flight even when stalled, which in turn allows steep flight slope angles and extremely low velocity flight with STOL capability.

== Specifications ==
Data from Manufacturer

General characteristics

- Wingspan: 6.5 m (21 ft 4 in)

Performance

- Maximum speed: 50 km/h (31 mph, 27 kn)
- Cruise speed: 30 km/h (19 mph, 16 kn)
- Endurance: 3 hr

== See also ==
- Aerostat
- Aerodyne
