= Viktoria Luise =

Zeppelin dirigible

LZ 11 Viktoria Luise
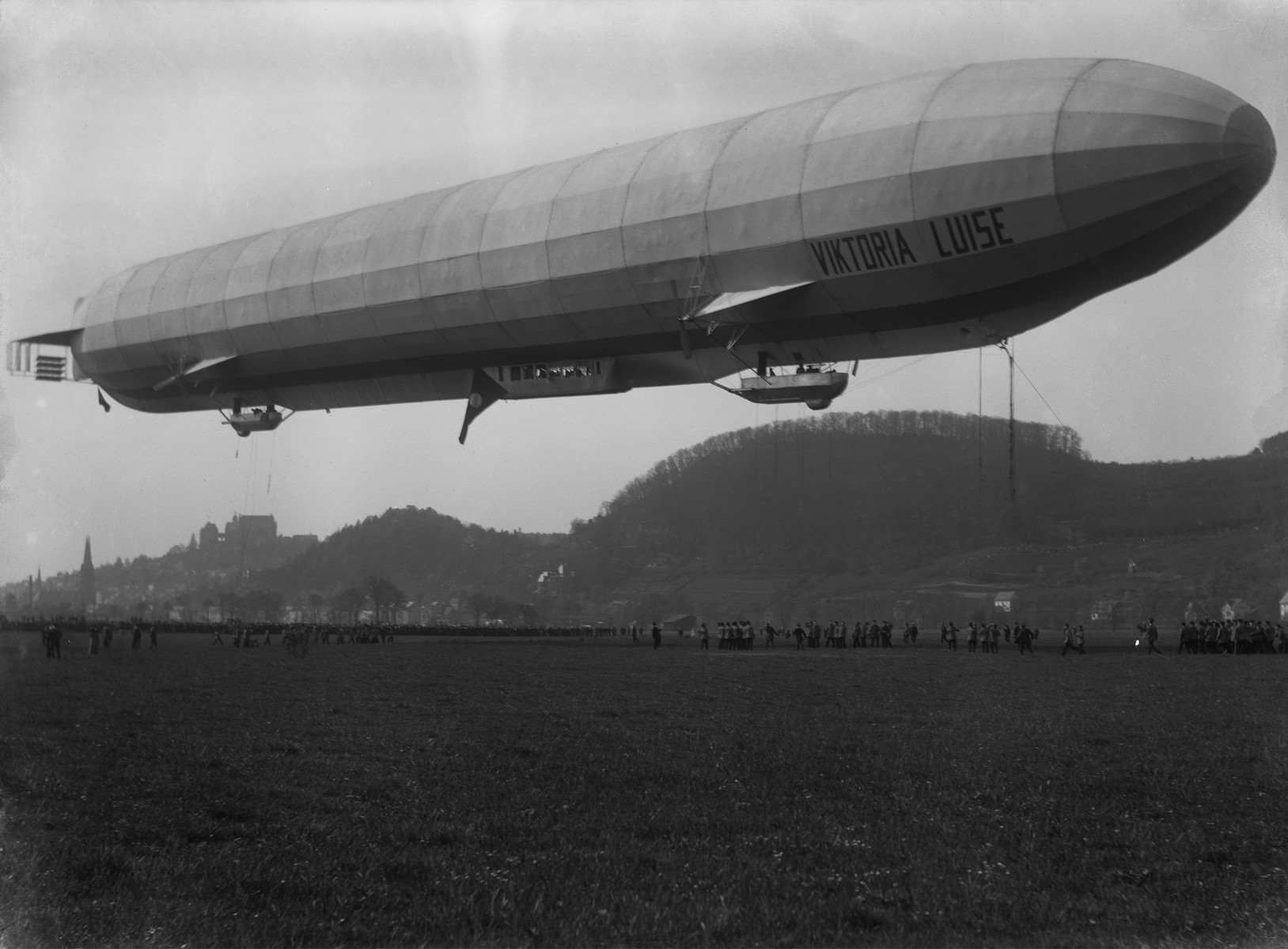
- LZ 11 Viktoria Luise in Marburg (1912)

General information
- Type: Passenger airship
- National origin: German Empire
- Manufacturer: Luftschiffbau Zeppelin
- Status: Destroyed while being housed in a hangar at Liegnitz
- Primary users: DELAG Imperial German Army
- Number built: 1

History
- Manufactured: 1912
- Introduction date: 4 March 1912
- First flight: 14 February 1912
- Retired: 8 October 1915

LZ 11 Viktoria Luise in the airship hangar at Baden-Oos Airfield

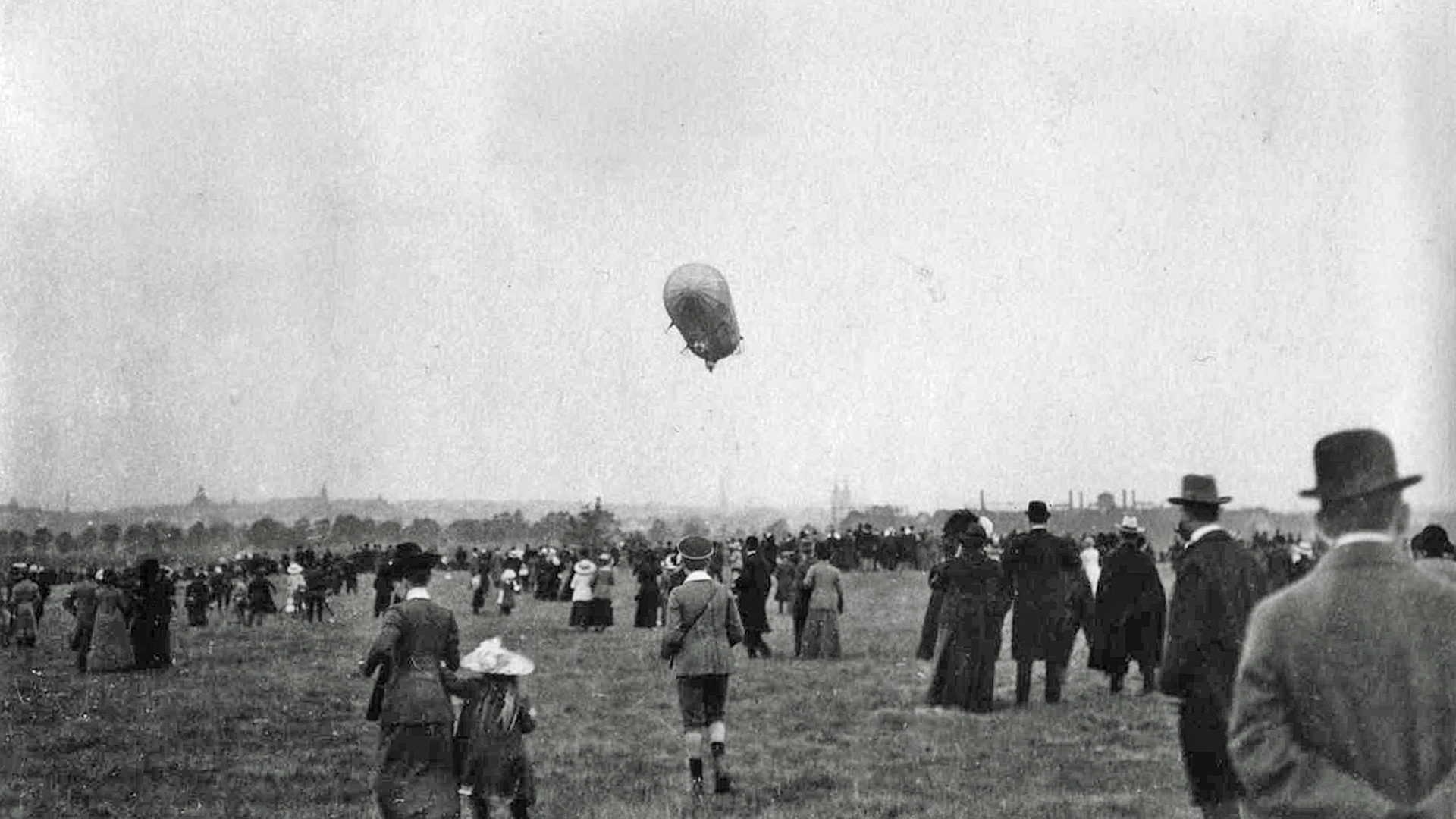
LZ 11 Viktoria Luise in Kassel, 29 September 1912

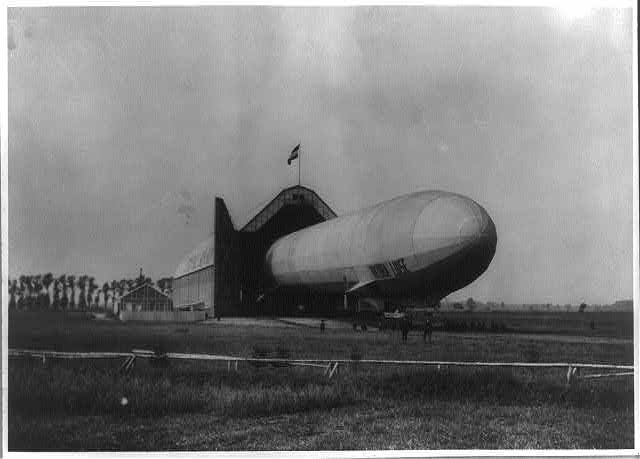
LZ 11 Viktoria Luise in Baden-Oos Airfield, September 1914

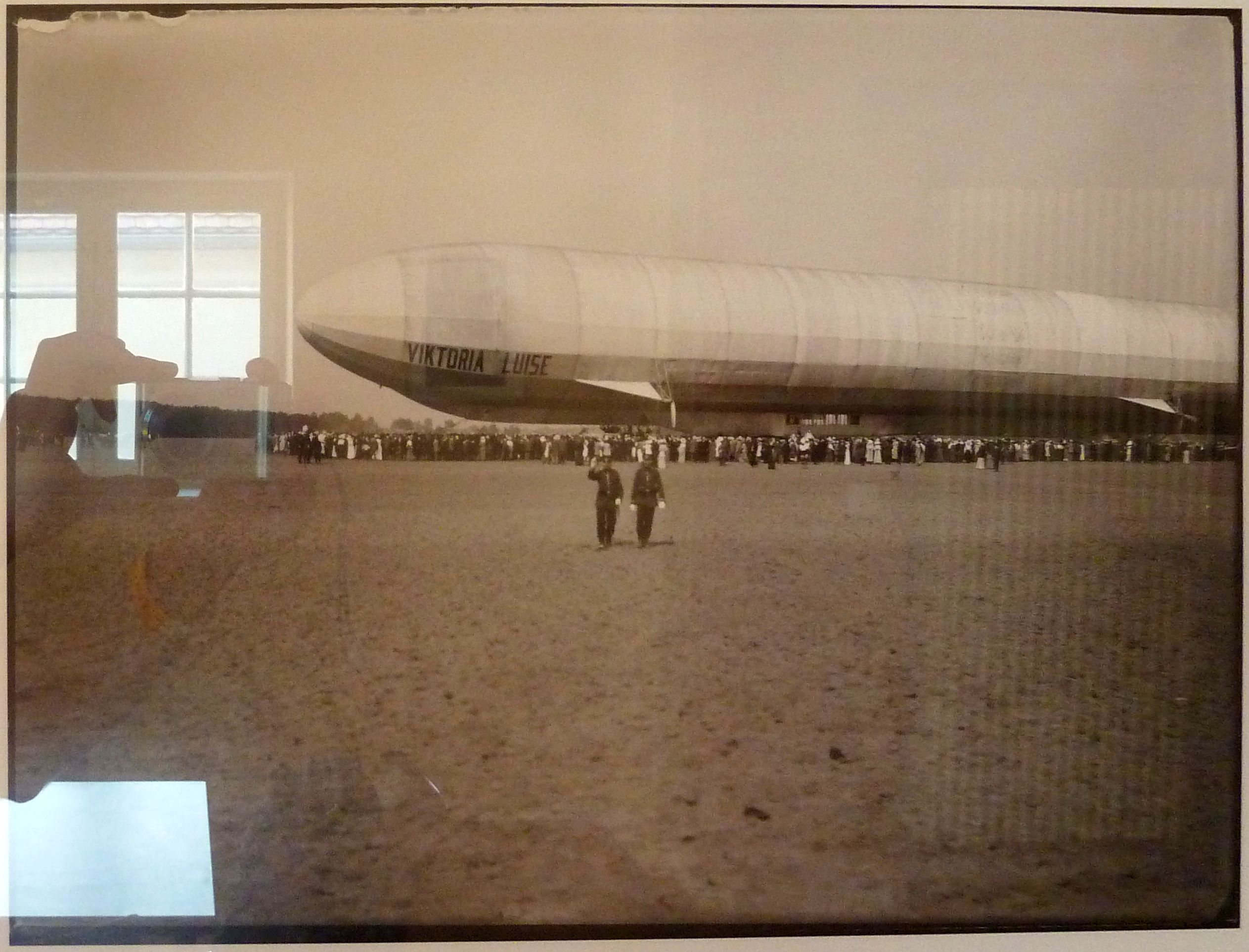
Viktoria Luise in Dresden, 1912

Viktoria Luise, hull number LZ 11, was a Zeppelin passenger airship operated by DELAG in the early 20th century. It was named after Princess Victoria Louise of Prussia.

== History ==
The airship made its maiden flight on 14 February 1912, and after being transferred to Frankfurt-Rebstock in mid‑February, it carried out its first passenger flight on 4 March 1912. It operated mainly within Germany, serving destinations such as Heligoland, Hamburg, and Copenhagen.

With the outbreak of World War I, LZ 11 was transferred to the Imperial German Army for use as a training ship. Before that, it had completed 489 passenger flights, covering 54,312 km and carrying 9,738 people (including crew). On 8 October 1915, it was destroyed while being housed in a hangar at the airship base in Liegnitz.

In total, Viktoria Luise made over 1,400 flights.

== Design and specifications ==
LZ 11 was a sister ship to Zeppelin LZ 10 Schwaben, with minor improvements such as enhanced steering and an extra eight‑metre segment. It measured 148 m in length, 14 m in diameter, with a gas volume of 18,700 m³. The framework enclosed 18 hydrogen‑filled gas cells.

The structure was covered in impregnated cotton fabric. Two engine gondolas and a central passenger cabin hung below the hull.

The front gondola held one of the three Maybach engines (110 kW/150 hp), plus the controls. The rear gondola accommodated the other two engines.

The front engine drove a pair of two‑bladed propellers (~500 rpm). The tail featured six vertical rudders and two horizontal stabilizers, giving a turning radius of about 550 m.

Total power was 330 kW, enabling a cruise speed of 61 km/h and a top speed of 72 km/h.

Usable lift was around 6,500 kg, decreasing with altitude (200 kg per 80 m) and temperature (75 kg per 1 °C). Fuel and oil consumption (1,200–1,500 kg) allowed 10–12 h flight with all engines, and up to 20 h with two engines, giving a range of 800–1,000 km, depending on winds.

The crew numbered 8–9: a commander, flight engineer, two helmsmen, and 1–2 mechanics in the front gondola, plus others in the rear.

The passenger cabin, designed by Bauer & Wirth (Stuttgart), had seating for 20, mahogany paneling, mother-of-pearl inlays, running‑water lavatory, carpeted floor, large view windows, wicker furniture, and service for cold food and drinks.

Its sister ship was Zeppelin LZ 13 Hansa, which began DELAG passenger flights on 30 July 1912.

== See also ==
- List of Zeppelins
