= List of Zodiac airships =

The Société Zodiac company, and its predecessor company Mallet, Mélandri et de Pitray, were a manufacturer of non-rigid airships and one rigid airship in the early 1900s and during World War I. The companies were co-founded by Maurice Mallet and Henry de La Vaulx in 1896. During World War I, the company specialized in producing small airships that could be easily deflated, compacted and transported via horse carts. The company also manufactured war planes. After the war the company shifted from airships and airplanes to producing a popular line of inflatable boats for military and civil markets, and aerospace production.

== Pre-World War I airships (1906-1913) ==
Source: D'Orcy's Airship Manual

Works No.	Name	Trials	Length (m)	Beam (m)	Volume (m^{3})	Power (h.p.)	Speed (km)	Notes	Images
1	Comte de la Vaulx	June 1906	32.5	6.4	730	14	25	Experimental craft. Named after company co-founder Count Henri de la Vaulx. Rebuilt as Zodiac II in 1908.	
2	Petit-Journal	April 1909	30,0	7.0	700	16	26	Advertising blimp for the La Petit-Journal. Rebuilt as Zodiac I in 1908.	
3	Petit-Journal II	1909	32.3	7.2	900	45	30	Advertising blimp for the La Petit-Journal	
4	Zodiac	October 1909	40.8	8.5	1400	45	45	Built for French Army	
5	Davis	July 31, 1910	40.8	8.5	1400	30	35	Built for Stuart Davis of The Zodiac Dirigible Airship Company, New York City.	
6	Zodiac II	1910	40.8	8.5	1400	30	35	Built for Belgian Army	
6a	Zodiac III	1913	42.5	8.5	1700	50	40	Built for Belgian Army	
7	Duindigt	May 1911	34.9	6.8	915	30	43	Built for Dutch Army	
8	Tchaika	November 1910	48.0	10.0	2140	60	40	Built for Russian Army	
9	Korchoune	December 1910	48.0	10.0	2140	60	40	Built for Russian Army	
10	Le Temps	March 1911	50.3	9.0	2300	110	50	Built for French Army	
11	Capitaine Ferber	December 1911	76.0	12.4	6000	220	56	Built for French Army	
12	Commandant Coutelle	April 1913	92.0	14.0	9500	400	62	Built for French Army	
13	Spiess	May 1913	113.0	13.5	12800	200	50	Only rigid airship built by Zodiac Society. Named after its engineer Joseph Spiess. Design was originally patented in 1873 but not built due to lack of funding. Offered to French Army, but failed its trials.	
13a	Spiess	December 1913	140.0	13.5	16400	400	70	Rebuilt to meet French Army standards, but was again rejected as too small.	
14		1913	130.0	15.0	23000	1000	80	Built for French Army	
15		1913	130.0	15.0	23000	1000	80	Built for French Army	
16		1913	130.0	15.0	23000	1000	80	Built for Russian Army	

== See also ==
- French blimps operated by the USN
