= Victoria Louise =

Victoria Louise or Viktoria Luise may refer to:

- SS Prinzessin Victoria Luise, a German cruise ship launched in 1897, that ran aground off the coast of Jamaica in 1906
- SS Victoria Luise, a German passenger liner originally named SS Deutschland; renamed in 1910
- SMS Victoria Louise, a German protected cruiser launched in 1897 and lead ship of her class
- Viktoria Luise, a pre-World War I German airship
- Princess Viktoria Luise of Prussia
