= Zeppelin LZ 121 Nordstern =

Weimar - Era Rigid Passenger Airship

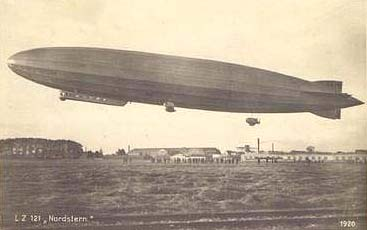
- LZ 121

History

(France) Germany
- Name: LZ 121
- Owner: Weimar Republic
- Operator: DELAG
- Builder: Luftschiffbau Zeppelin
- Laid down: 1919
- Launched: 1919
- Christened: January 1920
- Completed: January 1920
- Acquired: 13 June 1921
- Commissioned: 13 June 1921
- Maiden voyage: 13 June 1921
- In service: 13 June 1921
- Out of service: August 1926
- Identification: Nordstern
- Nickname(s): Méditerranée
- Fate: Scrapped in September 1926

General characteristics
- Class & type: Type Y
- Type: Airship
- Tonnage: 16,000 kg
- Tons burthen: 11,500 kg of cargo
- Length: 130.8 metres (429 ft 2 in)
- Beam: 18.7 metres (61 ft 4 in)ø
- Installed power: Four Maybach Mb IVa, 245 hp 6-cylinder inline engines
- Propulsion: 3 Lorenzen propellers
- Speed: 130 km/h
- Capacity: 22,500 m³ Gas Volume in 13 gas cells
- Crew: 16
- Aviation facilities: 4 gondolas
- Notes: 20 passengers

LZ 121 was a civilian airship from the Weimar Republic, a Y-Class zeppelin with a total length of 130.8 metres (429 ft 2 in). It received the nickname Nordstern while in German service, before it was given to France as war reparations on 13 June 1921. In France she was renamed Méditerranée and operated as a civilian air transport for a year. She was transferred to the French Navy and served in the Mediterranean for four years. She was decommissioned and broken up in August 1926.

== Construction ==
The LZ 121 was built by Luftschiffbau Zeppelin in Friedrichshafen, Germany after the First World War as a sister ship of LZ 120. It was built to transport passengers on regular flights from Friedrichshafen to Berlin and Stockholm. The ship was completed as a Y-Class zeppelin in January 1920 and had a total length of 130.8 metres (429 ft 2 in). It had a diameter of 18.7 metres (61 ft 4 in) and a 22,500 m³ gas volume contained in 13 gas cells. The ship could reach a top speed of 130 km/h, with four Maybach Mb IVa, 245 hp 6-cylinder inline engines driving three propellers. The ship had accommodations for 16 crew members and 20 passengers in the four gondolas.

== War reparations ==
Nordstern was designed to carry about 25 passengers on a Friedrichshafen - Berlin - Stockholm route but this route was never opened. The older sister ship LZ 120 Bodensee did run a regular passenger service between Friedrichshafen and Berlin in late 1919.

The LZ 120 and LZ 121 were not allowed to enter service as the Allies had forbidden Germany to make any more Zeppelins at the end of 1919. The German government had hoped that it was only a temporary measure, so the Spa Conference of 1920 was held to address the issue in July 1920 at Spa, Belgium. The Commission Chairman General E. A. Masterman decided on 9 August 1920 that the two airships be given to France and Italy as war reparations. The two ships were confiscated under protest by the German government. LZ 121 was awarded to France, which in May 1921 constructed an airship hangar for the zeppelin in Saint-Cyr-l'École at Versailles.

LZ 121 set out for its maiden voyage to France on 13 June 1921 at 11:30 am. About 10,000 people went to Friedrichshafen to get a last glimpse of the airship before it departed German airspace. It reached Saint-Cyr-l'École on the evening of the same day.

== Career in France ==
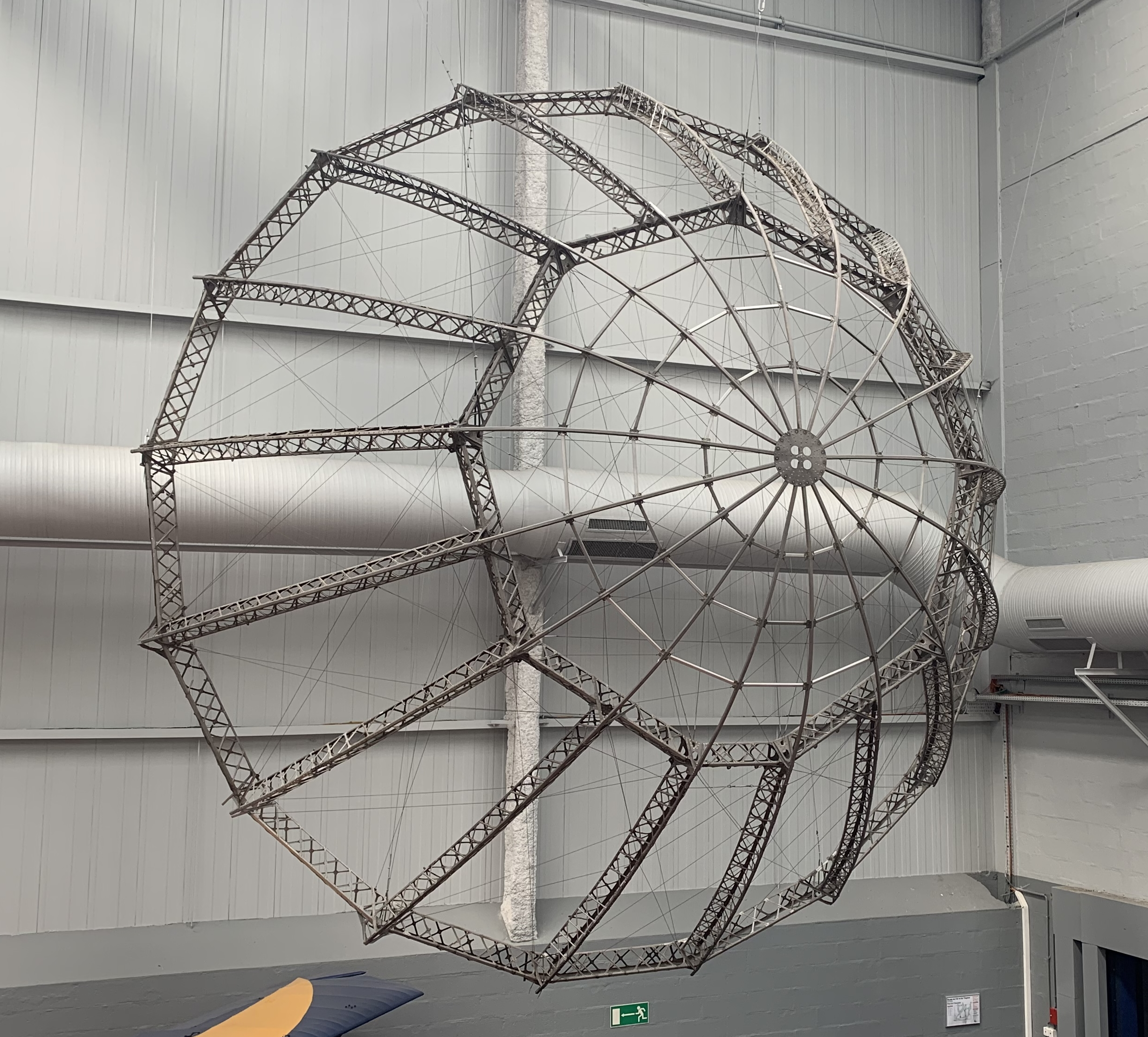
Nose cone framework on display at the Musée de l’air et de l’espace in Paris.

LZ 121 was put under the command of the French airline Société Anonyme de Navigation Aérienne (Sana), where it was renamed Méditerranée and operated as a Zeppelin air transport between southern France and Algeria.

=== Military career ===
In April 1922, Méditerranée was handed over to the French Navy and based at Cuers-Pierrefou, Toulon. The airship was used for training. New gas cells were installed, with the work finished in early 1923.

In 1923, Méditerranée participated in French naval maneuvers in the Mediterranean. From December 1923 the airship was limited to short-range flights, before being decommissioned and disassembled in August 1926. In September 1926 the framework of LZ 121 was tested under increasing loads until destruction.
