= Rigid airship =

Airship in which the envelope is supported by a framework

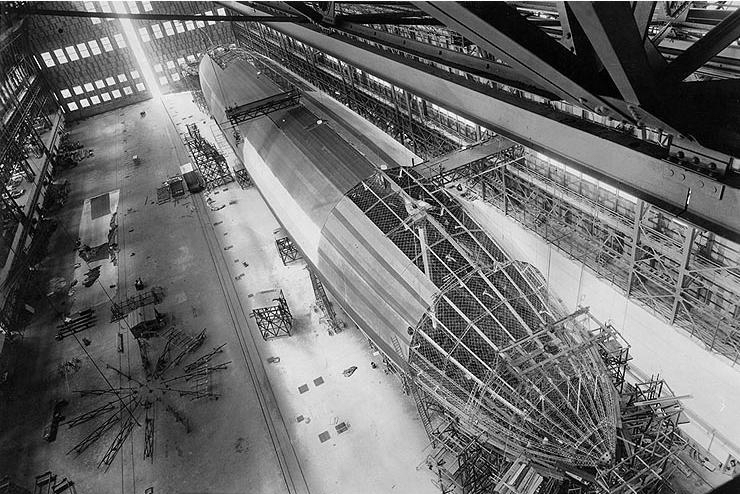
Construction of USS Shenandoah (ZR-1), 1923, showing the framework of a rigid airship

A rigid airship is a type of airship (or dirigible) in which the envelope is supported by an internal framework rather than by being kept in shape by the pressure of the lifting gas within the envelope, as in blimps (also called pressure airships) and semi-rigid airships. Rigid airships are often commonly called Zeppelins, though this technically refers only to airships built by the Luftschiffbau Zeppelin company.

In 1900, Count Ferdinand von Zeppelin successfully performed the maiden flight of his first airship; further models quickly followed. Prior to the First World War, Germany was a world leader in the field, largely attributable to the work of von Zeppelin and his Luftschiffbau Zeppelin company. During the conflict, rigid airships were tasked with various military duties, which included their participation in Germany's strategic bombing campaign. Numerous rigid airships were produced and employed with relative commercial success between the 1900s and the late 1930s. The heyday of the rigid airship was abruptly ended by the destruction of the Hindenburg by fire on 6 May 1937. The disaster not only destroyed the biggest zeppelin in the world, but the film caused considerable reputation damage to rigid airships in general. Several nations had ended military rigid airship programs after serious accidents earlier in the decade, but widespread public safety concerns in the wake of the Hindenburg disaster led several nations to permanently ground their existing rigid airships and scrap them in subsequent years.

== Construction and operation ==
Rigid airships consist of a structural framework usually covered in doped fabric containing a number of gasbags or cells containing a lifting gas. In the majority of airships constructed before the Second World War, highly flammable hydrogen was used for this purpose, resulting in many airships such as the British R101 and the German Hindenburg being lost in catastrophic fires. The inert gas helium was used by American airships in the 1920s and 1930s; it is also used in all modern airships.

Airships rely on the difference in density between the lifting gas and the surrounding air to stay aloft. Typically airships start a flight with their gasbags inflated to about 95% capacity: as the airship gains height the lifting gas expands as the surrounding atmospheric pressure reduces. As the surrounding atmospheric pressure decreases, the lifting gas expands, displacing ambient air. When the entire envelope is filled with expanded lifting gas, the aircraft is at its pressure height, which is generally the maximum operational ceiling. At this point, excess expanding gas must either be vented or the airship must descend so that the lifting gas can contract and ambient air brought back into the hull.

Airships can also generate a certain amount of aerodynamic lift by using their elevators to fly in a nose-up attitude. Similarly, by flying nose-down, down-force can be generated: this may be done to prevent the airship rising above its pressure height.

== History ==
=== Early history ===
By 1874, several people had conceived of a rigid dirigible (in contrast to non-rigid powered airships which had been flying since 1852). The Frenchman Joseph Spiess had patented a rigid airship design in 1873 but failed to get funding. Another such individual was the German Count Ferdinand von Zeppelin, who had outlined his thoughts of a rigid airship in diary entries from 25 March 1874 through to 1890 when he resigned from the military.

The concept of a metal-clad dirigible airship was again explored in the late 1800s by Russian rocket theorist Konstantin Eduardovich Tsiolkovsky. He wrote that since his teens (in the early 1870s) "the idea of the all-metal aerostat has never left my mind" and by 1891 he had produced detailed designs of a variable volume corrugated metal envelope airship that did not need ballonets.

David Schwarz had thought about building an airship in the 1880s and had probably started design work in 1891: by 1892, he had started construction. However, Schwarz's all-aluminium airship would not perform any test flights until after his death in 1897. Schwarz had secured help in its construction from the industrialist Carl Berg and the Prussian Airship Battalion; there was an exclusive contract in place between Schwarz and Berg, thus Count Zeppelin was obliged to reach a legal agreement with Schwarz's heirs to obtain aluminium from Carl Berg, although the two men's designs were different and independent from each other: the Schwarz design lacked the separate internal gasbags that characterise rigid airships. Using Berg's aluminium, von Zeppelin was able to start building his first airship, the LZ 1, in 1898.

=== First practical rigid airships ===
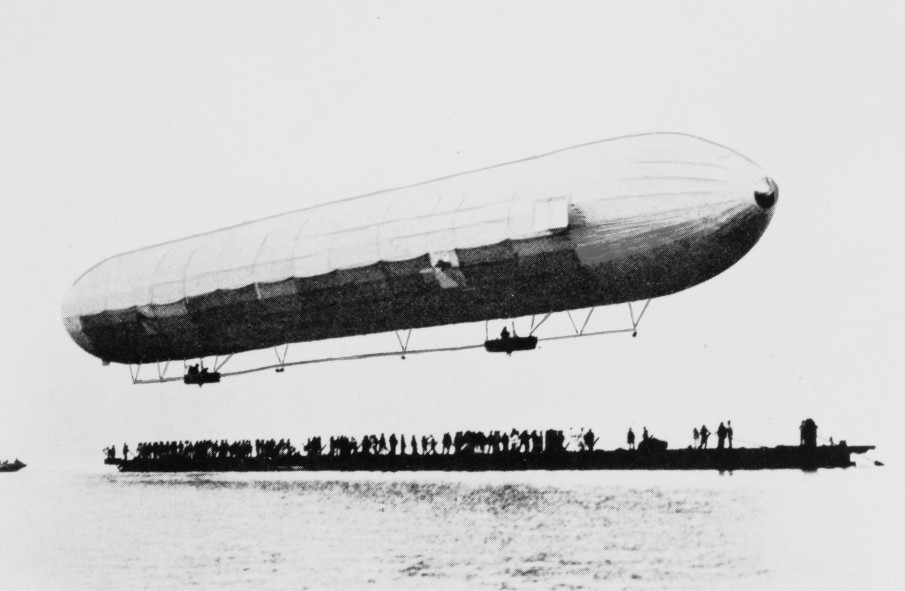
LZ 1, the first successful rigid airship

During July 1900, Ferdinand von Zeppelin completed LZ 1. Constructed in a floating shed on Lake Constance, it was 128.02 m (420 ft) long, 11.73 m (38 ft 6 in) in diameter with a volume of 11,298 m^{3} (399,000 ft ^{3}) and was powered by a pair of 11 kW (14 hp) Daimler engines. The first flight, lasting 20 minutes, was made on 2 July, but ended with the airship being damaged. After repairs and modifications, two further flights were conducted in October 1900. However, these initial experiments failed to attract any investors, and Count Zeppelin did not complete his next design, LZ 2, until 1906. This performed only a single flight on 17 January 1906, during which both engines failed and the zeppelin was compelled to conduct a forced landing in the Allgäu mountains; it was subsequently damaged beyond repair by a storm. Undeterred, Zeppelin quickly completed another airship with a largely similar design, the LZ 3, and put it into flight.

LZ 3 proved to have performed sufficiently to interest the German Army, who opted to purchase and operate it as the Z I until 1913. Even so, the German Army observed that they required an airship that would be capable of flying for 24 hours. As this was beyond the capability of LZ 3, it was decided to design and construct a larger craft, LZ 4. This was 136 m (446 ft) long, 12.95 m (42 ft 6 in) in diameter and powered by two Daimler engines delivering a total of 156 kW (210 hp). LZ 4 first flew on 20 June 1908, and on 1 July made a spectacular 12 hour cross-country flight during which it was flown over Switzerland to Zürich and then back to Lake Constance. The 24-hour trial was started on 4 August, but was interrupted by the failure of one of the engines. It was moored near Echterdingen in order to make repairs but a storm arose, causing it to break away from its moorings, after which it was blown into some trees and caught fire. The disaster took place in front of an estimated 40 to 50 thousand spectators, and produced an extraordinary wave of nationalistic support for von Zeppelin's work. Unsolicited donations from the public poured in: enough had been received within 24 hours to rebuild the airship, and the eventual total was over 6 million marks were donated, finally giving Count Zeppelin a sound financial base for his experiments.

Seven zeppelins were operated by DELAG, the first airline in the world. DELAG was founded at the suggestion of Alfred Colsman, the business manager of Zeppelin Luftschiffbau, seeking to capitalise on the German public's enthusiastic interest in the zeppelin by permitting them onboard passenger-carrying airships as a commercial venture; von Zeppelin distanced himself from this commercialisation, reportedly regarding such efforts to have been a vulgar tradesman's enterprise. Commencing such flights in 1910, DELAG was initially limited to offering pleasure cruises in the vicinity of the existing zeppelin bases.

DELAG soon received more capable zeppelins, such as the LZ 10 Schwaben, which would carry a total of 1,553 paying passengers during its career, which involved not only pleasure flights but a number of long-distance flights to destinations such as Frankfurt, Düsseldorf, and Berlin. The company's airships were also used by the Imperial German Navy for crew training, with the Navy crews operating passenger flights. By July 1914, one month prior to the start of the First World War, DELAG's Zeppelins had transported a total of 34,028 passengers on 1,588 commercial flights; over these trips, the fleet had accumulated 172,535 kilometres across 3,176 hours of flight. Commercial operations came to an abrupt end in Germany due to the outbreak of the First World War, after which DELAG's airships were taken over by the German Army for wartime service.

During 1911, the first rigid airship produced by the German Schütte-Lanz company was flown. Designed by the naval architect Johann Schütte, the Schütte-Lanz introduced a number of technical innovations. The shape of the hull was more streamlined than the early Zeppelin craft, the hulls of which were cylindrical for most of their length, simplifying construction at the expense of aerodynamic efficiency. Other Schütte-Lanz innovations included the use of an axial cable running the length of the airship to reduce additional stressing caused by the partial deflation of a single gasbag, the introduction of venting tubes to carry any hydrogen vented to the top of the ship and simplified cruciform tail surfaces.

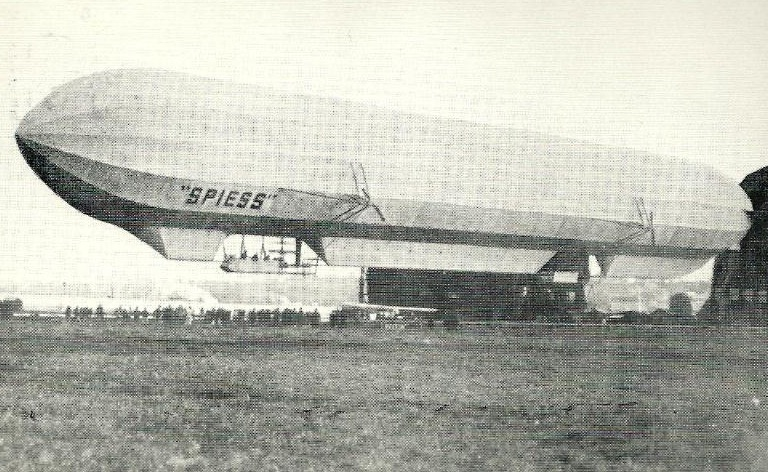
The extended Spiess airship in 1913

The British Royal Navy took an early interest in rigid airships and ordered His Majesty's Airship No. 1 in 1909 from Vickers Limited at Barrow-in-Furness. It was 512 ft (156.06 m) long with two Wolseley engines. It was completed in 1911 but broke in two before its first flight and was scrapped. This caused a temporary halt to British airship development, but in 1913 an order was placed for HMA No. 9r. Due to various factors, including difficulties in acquiring the necessary materials, it was not completed until April 1917.

France's only rigid airship was designed by Alsatian engineer Joseph Spiess and constructed by Société Zodiac at the Aérodrome de Saint-Cyr-l'École. It had a framework of hollow wooden spars braced with wire, and was given the name Zodiac XII but had the name SPIESS painted along the side of the envelope. It was 113 m (370 ft 9 in) long, with a diameter of 13.5 m (44 ft 3 in) and was powered by a single Chenu 200 hp engine that drove two propellers. It first flew on 13 April 1913, but it became clear that it was underpowered and required more lift, so it was lengthened to 140 m (459 ft 4 in) to accommodate three more gas cells and a second engine was added. Spiess then presented the airship to the French government as a gift. After further trials it was not accepted by the French military, because their view was that smaller non-rigid types would be more effective. The Spiess airship seems to have been broken-up in 1914.

=== First World War ===
During the First World War, the Zeppelin company constructed a total of 95 military airships. These were operated by both the German Navy and the Army. German military airship stations had been established before the conflict and on September 2–3, 1914, the Zeppelin LZ 17 dropped three 200 lb bombs on Antwerp in Belgium. In 1915, a bombing campaign against England using airships was initiated, the first raid taking place on 19 January 1915 when two airships dropped bombs on Norfolk. On 31 May 1915 the first bombs fell on London. Raids continued throughout 1915 and continued into 1916. On the night of September 2–3, 1916 the first German airship was shot down over English soil by Lt. Leefe Robinson flying a BE 2c. This and subsequent successes by Britain's defences led to the development of new Zeppelin designs capable of operating at greater altitudes, but even when these came into service the Germans only carried out a small number of airship raids on Britain during the rest of the war, carrying on the campaign using aeroplanes and reserving their airships for their primary duty of naval patrols over the North Sea and the Baltic. The last casualties occurred on 12 April 1918.

The first British airship to be completed during the war was No. 9r, which was first flown at the end of 1916 and was used for experimental and training purposes. By then, the war against U-boats was at its height and 9r was quickly followed by four airships of the 23 Class, two R23X Class and two R31 Class, the last being based on the Schütte-Lanz principle of wooden construction, and remain the largest mobile wooden structures ever built. The only significant combat success of these airships, aside from their deterrent effect, was assistance in the destruction of SM UB-115 by R29 in September 1918.

=== 1919–1939 ===
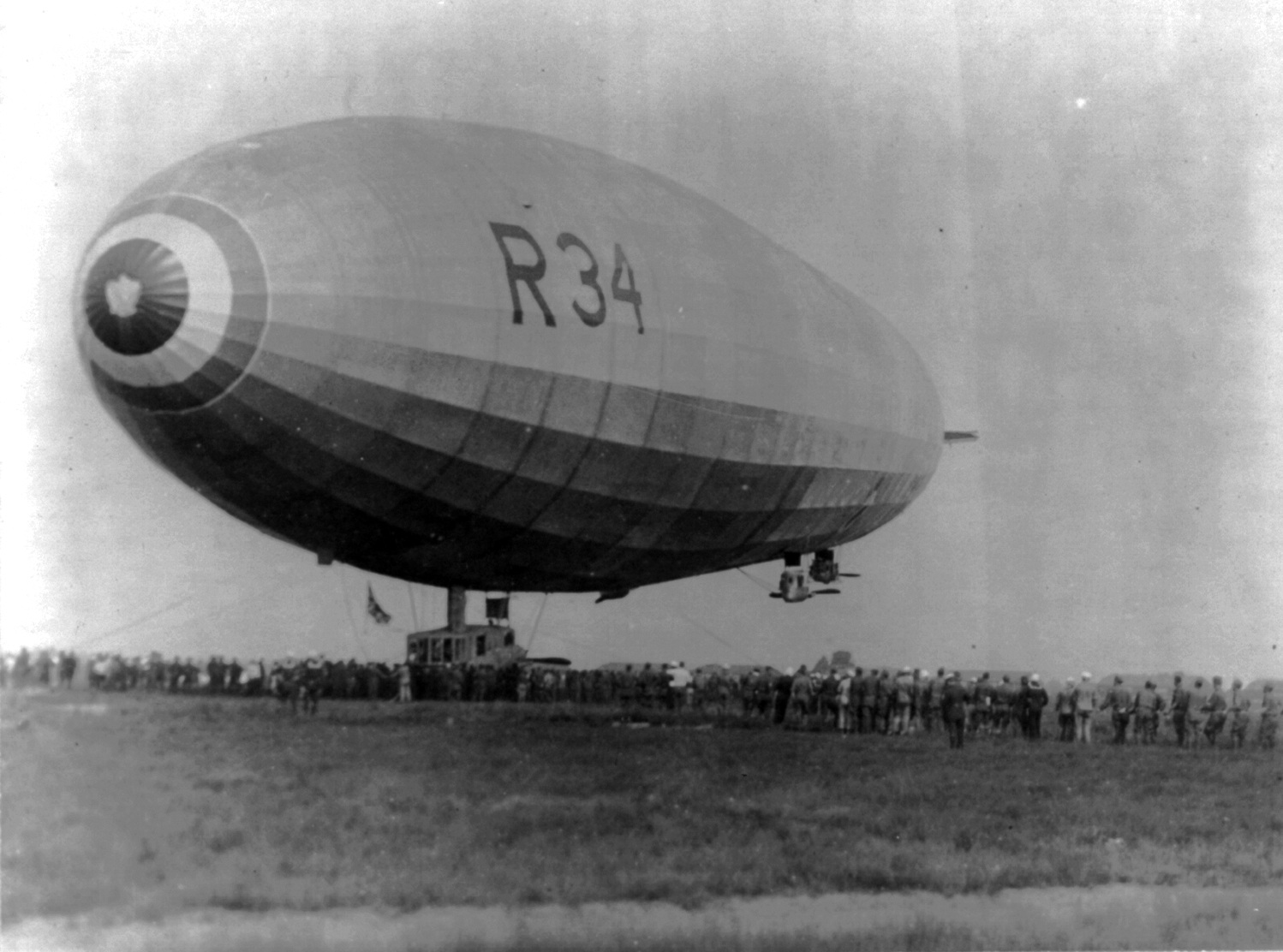
The British R34 in Long Island during the first ever return crossing of the Atlantic in July 1919

By the end of the conflict, two British airships of the R33 Class were nearing completion. R33 became a civilian airship, finishing her career doing experimental work. The R34 became the first aircraft to complete a return Atlantic crossing in July 1919 but was severely damaged in January 1921 and was subsequently scrapped. R.35, a unique admiralty design, was almost finished when work was stopped in early 1919. R36 and R.37 were stretched R.35s. R.36 was completed after the war as a civilian airship registered as G-FAAF. R.36 had two engines from the German L71. Modifications for passenger service involved installing a 131 foot long combined control and passenger gondola to accommodate 50 passengers. R.36 suffered a structural failure of one horizontal and one vertical fin. It was repaired and served to aid the police in traffic control for the Ascot race in 1921. R.36 was damaged in a mooring accident in 1921, and while repaired R.36 never flew again. Retained for possible use as a commercial airship R.36 was broken up in 1926. Four airships of the R38 Class were started but only one completed: it was sold to the US Navy and renamed ZR-2. In June 1921 it broke up in the air over Kingston-upon-Hull before it could be delivered, killing 44 of its Anglo-American crew. The last airship that had been ordered amid the First World War was the R80; it was completed in 1920 but was tested to destruction in the following year after it was found to have no commercial use.

After the end of World War I, Luftschiffbau Zeppelin resumed building and operating civilian airships. Under the terms of the Treaty of Versailles, Germany was prohibited from building airships with a capacity in excess of 28,000 m^{3} (1,000,000 ft^{3}), greatly limiting the company's scope. However, a pair of small passenger airships, LZ 120 Bodensee and a sister ship LZ 121 Nordstern were built, intended for use between Berlin and Friedrichshafen. They were subsequently confiscated and handed over to Italy and France as war reparations in place of wartime zeppelins which had been sabotaged by their crews in 1919. The Zeppelin company was saved from extinction by an order for an airship, the USS Los Angeles, being placed by the US Navy; this airship conducted its first flight on 27 August 1924. The Goodyear-Zeppelin partnership would continue up until the outbreak of the Second World War.

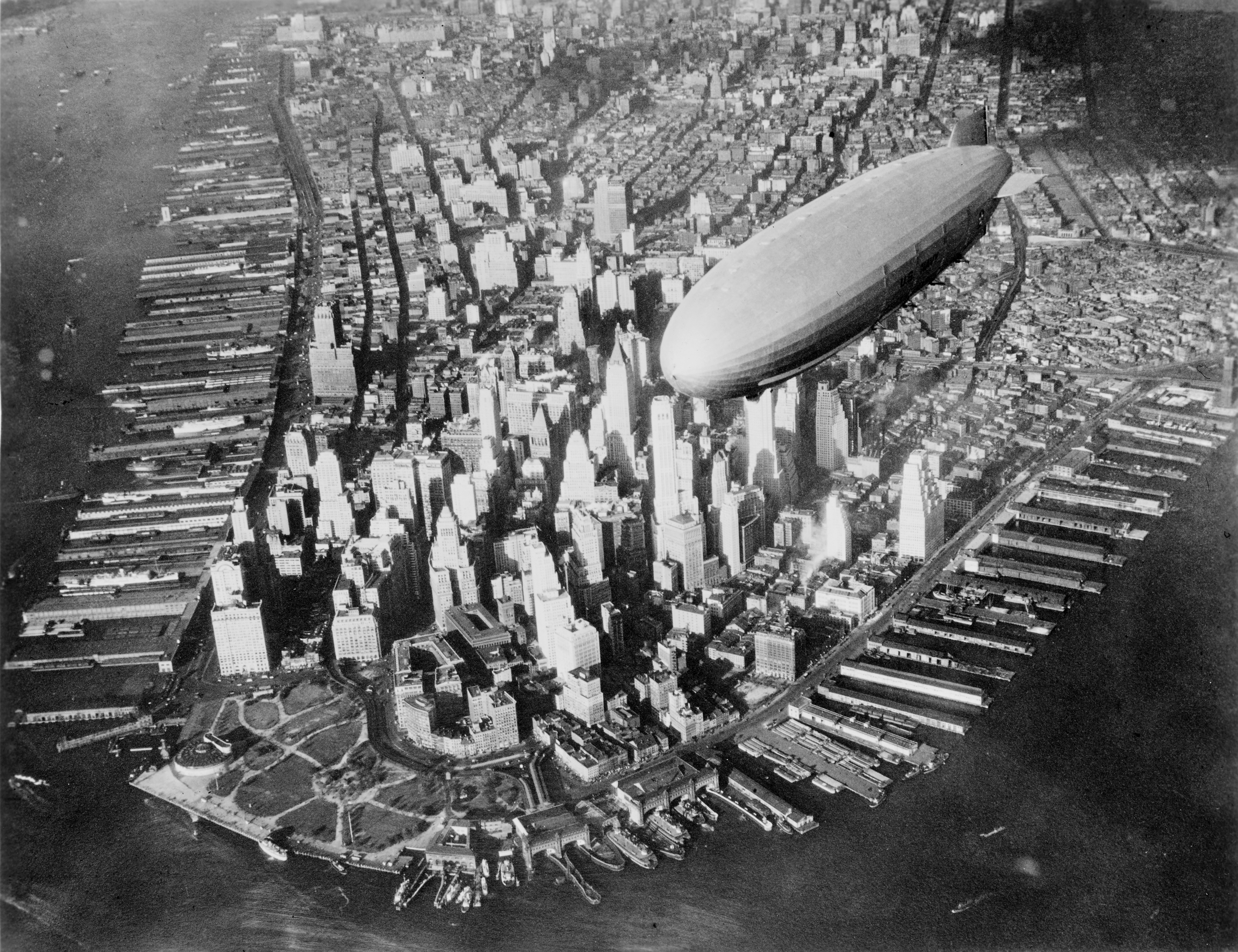
USS Akron passes over Lower Manhattan.

In 1924, the British Government initiated the Imperial Airship Scheme, a plan to launch airship routes throughout the British Empire. This involved the construction of two large airships, the R100 and R101, paid for by the government. The R100 was privately built by Vickers-Armstrongs using existing commercial practices, with a design team led by Barnes Wallis, who had previously co-designed the R80. After her first flight in December 1929, R100 made a successful round trip to Quebec in Canada in July and August the following year. The competing R101 was designed and built by the Air Ministry and was supposed to encourage new approaches. R101 was severely overweight, largely due to the decision to use diesel engines to reduce fire risk, and it was decided to lengthen the airship's hull to increase lift. In October 1930, R101 set off to Karachi on its first overseas flight but crashed in northern France in bad weather killing 48 of the 54 people on board, including Lord Thomson, the Secretary of State for Air, and most of the design team. Following this disaster, the R100 was grounded and was finally scrapped in November 1931, marking the end of British interest in rigid airships.

During 1925, the Versailles restrictions were relaxed by the Allies, enabling Dr Hugo Eckener, the chairman of Zeppelin Luftschiffbau, to pursue his vision of developing a zeppelin suitable for launching an intercontinental air passenger service. The sum of 2.5 million Reichsmarks (ℛℳ, the equivalent of US$600,000 at the time, or $11 million in 2018 dollars), was raised via public subscription, while the German government also granted over ℛℳ 1 million ($5 million) for the project. Accordingly, Zeppelin Lufftschiffbau began construction of the first of a new generation of airships, the LZ 127 Graf Zeppelin. On 18 September 1928, the completed airship flew for the first time. Shortly thereafter, DELAG commenced operations with the Graf Zeppelin, being enabled to launch regular, nonstop, transatlantic flights several years before airplanes would be capable of sufficient range to cross the ocean in either direction without stopping. During 1931, the Graf Zeppelin began offering regular scheduled passenger service between Germany and South America, a route which was continued up until 1937. During its career, Graf Zeppelin crossed the South Atlantic a total of 136 times. The airship also performed numerous record-breaking flights, including a successful circumnavigation of the globe.

The United States rigid airship program was based at Lakehurst Naval Air station, New Jersey. USS Shenandoah (ZR-1) was the first rigid airship constructed in America, and served from 1923 to 1925, when it broke up in mid-air in severe weather, killing 14 members of its crew. USS Los Angeles (ZR-3) was a German airship built for the United States in 1924. The ship was grounded in 1931, due to the Depression, but was not dismantled for over 5 years. A pair of large airships, the Akron and Macon, that both functioned as flying aircraft carriers were procured by the US Navy. However, they were both destroyed in separate accidents; the Akron was flown into the sea in bad weather and broke up, resulting in the deaths of over seventy people, including one of the US Navy's proponents of airships, Rear Admiral William A. Moffett. Macon also ended up in the sea when it flew into heavy weather with unrepaired damage from an earlier incident, but the introduction of life-jackets following the loss of the Akron meant only two people died.

LZ 129 Hindenburg carried passengers, mail and freight on regularly scheduled commercial services from Germany to North and South America. However, such services were brought to an abrupt end by the Hindenburg disaster of 1937. While the Hindenburg's sister ship, the LZ 130 Graf Zeppelin II, was completed, it would only perform thirty European test and government-sponsored flights before being grounded permanently. During 1938, Luftschiffbau Zeppelin was compelled to terminate Zeppelin manufacturing, while all operations of existing airships was ceased within two years. The frames of Graf Zeppelin and Graf Zeppelin II, along with scrap material from the Hindenburg, were subsequently scrapped that same year for their materials, which were used to fulfil wartime demands for fixed-wing military aircraft for the Luftwaffe.

== Demise ==
Following the Hindenburg disaster, the Zeppelin company resolved to use helium in their future passenger airships. However, by this time, Europe was well on the path to the Second World War, and the United States, the only country with substantial helium reserves, refused to sell the necessary gas. Commercial international aviation was limited during the war, so development of new airships was halted. Although several companies, including Goodyear, proposed post-war commercial designs, these were largely to no avail. At an Air Ministry post-war planning session in 1943, a R.104 was proposed to fulfill the Air Ministry Specification C.18/43. Despite the presence of two airship stalwarts, Nevil Shute and Wing Commander T.R. Cave-Browne-Cave the airship was not adopted. The proposed R.104 was described by Lord Beaverbrook as "A pretty face, but no good in the kitchen." The decision was to develop the Bristol Brabazon to meet C.18/43. The Brabazon was a much ballyhooed failure of the post war period. Following the rapid advances in aviation during and after World War II, fixed-wing heavier-than-air aircraft, able to fly much faster than rigid airships, became the favoured method of international air travel.

=== Modern rigids ===
The last rigid airships designed and built were built in the 1960s. The AEREON III was constructed in Mercer County, New Jersey in the mid-1960s. It was to utilize the method of "propulsion" developed and demonstrated by Doctor Solomon Andrews in the 1860s as well as a stern-mounted engine. The AEREON III, which had three side-by-side hulls, flipped over during taxi tests and was never repaired. A replacement, the AEREON 26, with a delta configuration, was constructed and flight-tested in the early 1970s. The test program ended due to the expiration of the life time of the drone engine. As of 2019 it has been added to the Air Victory Museum's permanent collection and is on public display in Lumberton, New Jersey.

The Zeppelin company refers to their NT ship as a rigid, but the envelope shape is retained in part by super-pressure of the lifting gas, and so the NT is more correctly classified as semi-rigid.

Aeroscraft was certified airworthy by the FAA in September 2013 and began flight testing.

In 2023, the Pathfinder 1, a prototype electric airship built by LTA Research in the United States, was unveiled. It is the largest modern airship and flying aircraft at 124.5 m (408 ft) long. It also is the first rigid airship to have been built in the 85 years since the last rigid, the Graf Zeppelin, was built.

== See also ==
- List of Zeppelins
- List of Schütte-Lanz rigid airships
- Airship hangar
- Rigid Airship Design
- List of airship accidents
