= Aereon Dynairship =

US conceptual airship

General information
- Type: Concept lifting body hybrid aircraft
- National origin: United States of America
- Designer: William Miller, working on behalf of the Aereon Corporation
- Status: Conceptual only
- Number built: None

The Aereon Dynairship is a conceptual large hybrid airship developed by the Aereon Corporation for civilian and military cargo transport.

It is one of Aereon's lifting body airship concepts, where a craft without a conventional "wing" generates lift by itself. It would also have been filled with buoyant gas such as preferably helium or hydrogen, but possibly heated gases, making it a truly hybrid craft. This kind of configuration was researched by Aereon beginning in the 1960s and continuing until the 1980s. Several patent applications were filed, including a patent application filed in 1969. The early development of the deltoid pumpkinseed aerobody was described in a John McPhee 1973 book.

== Design and development ==
The Dynairship was to be a very large ship, the conceptual designs showing it to form a large triangle, with small finlets at the back of either end.

The proof-of-concept aircraft for the Dynairship was the Aereon 26. Following the apparent success of this project, Aereon's board voted unanimously to proceed with the Dynairship for civilian and commercial purposes.

Three proposed versions of the Dynairship were put forward:

- A "small patrol aircraft" 50 feet (15 m) long, with a gross weight of 4,000 pounds (1,800 kg)
- A "medium-size cargo aircraft" 200 feet (61 m) long, with a gross weight of 270 long tons (270 t)
- A "logistic carrier" 1,000 feet (300 m) long, with a gross weight of 4,200 long tons (4,300 t).

Original propulsion was stated in the patent to be four externally mounted propellers on the top of the body, with engine nacelles. In the 1991 patent, a glass cockpit can be seen at the front. However, the Aereon corporation state that the design can be either crewed or uncrewed.

A lack of funding ended the project. According to Aereon, the Department of Defense told Miller in 2003, "You were 30 years ahead of your time"!

=== Navy and Air Force research ===
When it turned out that building the Dynairship under Aereon at that time was financially impossible, Miller went on to design very similar craft for research in the military field. The job of building a prototype craft was given to Lockheed's L-TAV division, and the resulting craft was named the STOL-340.
