= LZ 13 Hansa =

- Hansa landing at the Aerodromen airfield.

General information
- Type: Passenger airship
- National origin: Germany
- Manufacturer: Luftschiffbau Zeppelin
- Status: Retired
- Primary users: DELAG German military
- Number built: 1

History
- First flight: 30 July 1912
- Retired: 1916

Zeppelin LZ 13 Hansa (or simply Hansa) was a German civilian rigid airship first flown in 1912. It was built for DELAG to carry passengers and post and flew the first international passenger flight, visiting Denmark and Sweden in September 1912. In 1913 it was hired to the Imperial German Navy as a training craft, and at the outbreak of World War I it was requisitioned by the German military who used it for bombing, reconnaissance, and finally as a training airship.

== Design ==
Hansa was the sister ship of LZ 11 Viktoria Luise, the first of the two G Class Zeppelins built. The design was an enlargement of LZ 10 Schwaben, lengthened by 7.9 m (26 ft) to accommodate an extra gasbag and fitted with slightly more powerful engines.

== Civilian flights ==
The closed passenger cabin was attached to the hull behind the open control cabin and had room for 24 passengers. From 1912 to 1914, Hansa was operating mostly from Hamburg and Potsdam, and based in Dresden at the outbreak of the war. Count Zeppelin commanded Hansa on the first commercial airship flight from to Denmark and Sweden on 19 September 1912.

This was the first time a commercial Zeppelin flew outside Germany. Click on the blue globes to see the route taken:

- 03:55 53°33′N 9°59′E early morning launch from Hamburg, Germany
- 07:15 54°35′N 11°31′E over the Hyllekrog spit on Lolland island
- 07:20 54°34′N 11°56′E over Gedser
- 08:00 54°46.5′N 11°30.5′E over Maribo
- 08:25 55°0′30″N 11°54′37″E over Vordingborg
- 08:40 55°15′N 12°08′E over Faxe
- 09:10 55°25′N 12°09′E over Herfølge
- 09:30 55°27′N 12°11′E over Køge
- 10:00 55°39′N 12°18′E over Taastrup
- 10:20 55°41′N 12°34′E landed at Copenhagen, where people wrote postcards to family in Germany
- 11:55 55°35′N 13°2′E launched from Copenhagen and flew over Malmö
- 13:30 54°46′N 11°53′E over Nykøbing Falster
- 15:30 53°52′N 10°41′E over Lübeck
- 16:40 53°33′N 9°59′E landed back in Hamburg

During two years of commercial DELAG service it carried 6,217 passengers on 399 flights, covering 44,437 km (27,612 miles).

== Military use ==
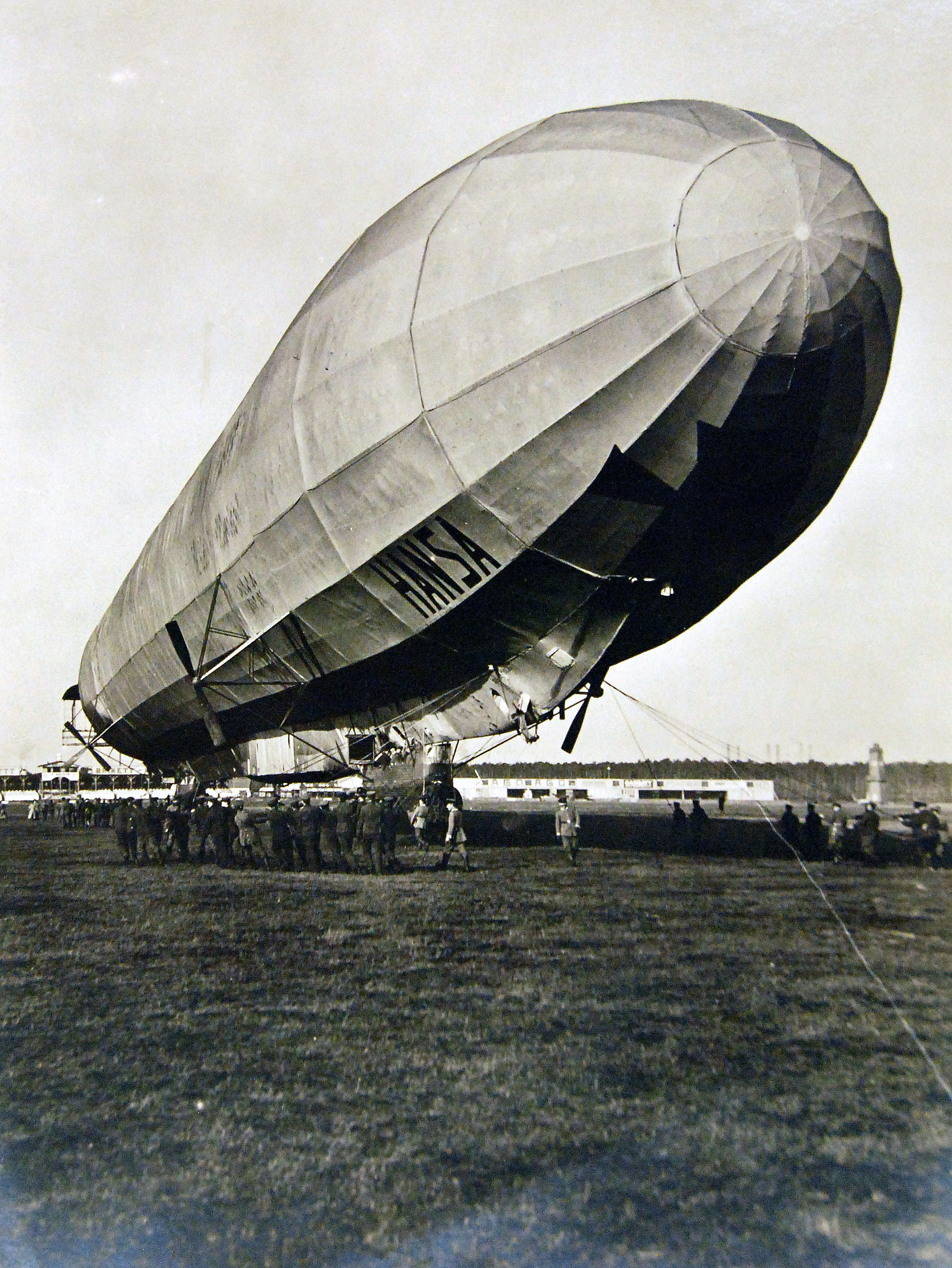
School maneuver of the Zeppelin Hansa near Berlin

- The military added a platform to the top of the hull and installed two machine guns
- Attack missions on France and reconnaissance missions over the Baltic Sea (involved in the taking of Libau)
- From early 1915 used as a training airship, making over 500 flights over Berlin
- Dismantled in August 1916

== See also ==
- Timeline of hydrogen technologies

== Specifications ==
Data from Robinson, H. Giants in the Sky, p.330

General characteristics

- Capacity: 20

Performance
