= Rigid Airship Design =

Dutch airship company

Rigid Airship Design B.V. was a company founded in the Netherlands in 1998 with the aim of building a modern rigid airship. In 1996, Scottish intellectual and airship expert Ian Alexander initiated a project in the Netherlands in co-operation with the Technical University of Delft, to design and construct a modern classic rigid airship based on proven technology. The project involved leading Dutch companies RDM Aerospace N.V., Nevesbu (designers of ships and submarines), Stork N.V., and Fokker Aviation. Consortium Rigid Airship Design was established on 26 May 1998 but went bankrupt 1 August 2001. The Utrecht-based lawyer Sjoerd Warringa was appointed as trustee by the Utrecht court.

The initiative provoked series of discussions in the Dutch Parliament and on governmental level. As a result, ‘Platform Luchtschepen’ (Airship Platform) was structured to investigate the attainability of projects like this in The Netherlands. The platform consists of representatives from governmental bodies, industry and environmental organisations. Results of the platform and the creative legacy of the Rigid Airship Design project are the cornerstones of a feasibility study on how to deploy a classic rigid airship to International Relief Organisations for rapid disaster relief after tsunamis, earthquakes and other calamities.
