= Aereon III =

US hybrid airship

AEREON III

General information
- Type: Hybrid fixed wing aircraft/lighter-than-air craft.
- National origin: United States of America
- Manufacturer: AEREON Corporation
- Number built: 1

The AEREON III was an experimental hybrid airship of rigid construction built by the AEREON Corporation in the early 1960s. Of unconventional design, the airship featured three gas envelopes attached side-by-side, with the connecting structures shaped as airfoils to create extra lift as the craft moved forward. Intended as a small prototype craft that would precede the development of much larger hybrid airships, the AEREON III was constructed between 1959 and 1965 but was destroyed during taxiing tests in 1966 and scrapped without having flown. It was "the first rigid airship to be built since Graf Zeppelin II".

== Background ==
The AEREON Corporation had been founded in 1959 by Presbyterian minister and U.S. Naval Reserve chaplain turned airship enthusiast Monroe Drew and Navy airship veteran Lieutenant Commander John Fitzpatrick. The organization was named in honor of Solomon Andrews's 1863 airship Aereon, a three-hulled craft—like AEREON III—that could make forward progress without an engine by alternately dropping ballast and valving hydrogen. (Aereon II was Andrews's second airship, a single-hulled craft.)

AEREON III was designed by Fitzpatrick and constructed between 1959 and 1965 at Mercer County Airport in Trenton, New Jersey. The construction work was carried out by Everett Linkenhoker, an airship rigger hired on the recommendation of Aereon's consultant, the distinguished airship aviator and retired U.S. Navy Vice Admiral Charles Rosendahl.

Future versions of the airship were envisaged as being up to 1,000 feet (300 m) long, possibly with nuclear propulsion. Even "thousand-foot automated Aereons moving in connected trains through the lower atmosphere" were foreseen by some of those involved.

== Description ==
=== Configuration ===
The AEREON III comprised three rigid hulls, each 83 feet (25 m) in length and 17 feet 6 inches (5.33 m) in maximum diameter, connected by truss members. The connecting structures between the hulls were faired in an airfoil section, and the aircraft as a whole functioned as an airfoil with an aspect ratio of 0.74. The design was intended to "maximize the dynamic lifting forces acting on the airship hull and to take the fullest advantage of these forces in flight." Each hull contained six gas cells, for a total lifting gas volume of 40,000 cubic feet (1,100 m^{3}). There were ventral fins with rudders at the aft ends of the outer two hulls and elevons on the trailing edges of the connecting structures. The two-seat cockpit was located in the nose of the central hull.

=== Structure and materials ===
The hulls had a Zeppelin-type structure comprising seven 20-sided main rings, three intermediate rings between each pair of main rings, and wire bracing; however, the structural members were of Duralumin tubing, rather than the built-up girders of earlier rigids. The structure was described as "half as heavy and twice as strong as the structural material in the ill-fated Hindenburg." The hulls were enclosed by a double-layer outer cover, comprising an outer Tedlar layer and an inner layer of ripstop nylon treated with dope. The gas cells were also made of Tedlar. The fins were of sheet Duralumin on frames of the same material, joined primarily with epoxy resin rather than by riveting.

=== Landing gear ===
The airship had a tricycle undercarriage with a non-steerable nosewheel beneath the central hull and steerable (via a connection with the rudders) wheels at the tips of the ventral fins at the aft ends of the outer hulls. The nosewheel functioned as an "internal mooring mast," with a telescopic strut that allowed the ship's angle of attack to be varied while moored (e.g. nose down to hug the ground or nose up in preparation for takeoff) and a tie-down fitting at its lower end.

=== Propulsion ===
The AEREON III was powered by a single engine located at the aft end of the central hull. This engine was reported in 1962 as being a Solar Titan gas turbine of 80 horsepower (60 kW), but the engine eventually installed was described as a "four-cylinder McCullough" (sic—presumably McCulloch). The engine drove a 21 feet (6.4 m) diameter, two-bladed pusher propeller (actually a helicopter rotor rotating in the vertical plane). The location of the propeller at the aft end of the hull was stated to assist in boundary layer control and its cyclic pitch feature to facilitate low-speed control. AEREON patented this propulsion and control system in 1966. However, the propeller required shortening before trials commenced because of its "greatly excessive vibration."

=== Buoyancy control ===
Five propane burners in each hull enabled the helium to be heated to increase lift; the ship would be about 400 pounds (180 kg) heavy (i.e. weight greater than static lift) with the gas cells 83 percent filled with helium, but heating the gas would increase the static lift by 800 pounds (360 kg). The helium could also be cooled by admitting air through vents in the noses of the hulls, with the assistance of blowers. The double-layer outer cover, mentioned above, facilitated thermal insulation of the gas cells. AEREON also patented the pressurization and buoyancy-control system, in 1965. One source states that the AEREON III's buoyancy-control capabilities would allow it to fly using "gravity propulsion"—without the assistance of an engine—along the lines of Solomon Andrews's original Aereon but substituting helium heating for Andrews's dropping of ballast and helium cooling for his valving of hydrogen. However, Fitzpatrick is quoted elsewhere as "deplor[ing] such exaggerations."

== Specifications ==
Data from Jane's All the World's Aircraft 1965-66

General characteristics

- Crew: 2
- Capacity: 40,000 cu ft
- Length: 85 ft 0 in (25.91 m)
- Wingspan: 56 ft (17 m)
- Empty weight: 2,800 lb (1,270 kg)
- Powerplant: 1 × Solar Titan turbine, 70 hp (52 kW)
- Propellers: 2-bladed Helicom, 21 ft 0 in (6.40 m) diameter reversible-pitch rotor/propeller

Performance

- Maximum speed: 65 mph (105 km/h, 56 kn)
- Never exceed speed: 127 mph (204 km/h, 110 kn)
- Endurance: 4 hours
- Service ceiling: 8,500 ft (2,600 m)
- Take-off run: 800 ft (240 m)

== Destruction ==
On April 15, 1966, the AEREON III was taxiing on a runway at Mercer County Airport in a 15 knots (28 km/h) crosswind when it failed to slow down, tried to turn at the end of the runway, and tilted over onto two wheels. One of the pilots jumped from the cockpit, and the airship then turned flat on its back. The second pilot then jumped straight down from the inverted cockpit, and the airship overturned a second time. According to John McPhee's book The Deltoid Pumpkin Seed, the remains of the AEREON III were "virtually bulldozed back into the hangar, arriving more or less in flakes." However, another source states that reconstruction into a new, larger AEREON IIIB was contemplated. This craft would have been 100 feet (30 m) long and 75 feet (23 m) in span, with a "metal-clad, partially delta" shape. According to this source, the damaged AEREON III was eventually broken up "sometime in 1967."

The AEREON III was succeeded by the AEREON 26, which had an entirely different, deltoid shape. The new aircraft inherited its predecessor's McCulloch engine, along with aluminum tubing from the structure of AEREON III and several of its instruments. One of the nosecones from AEREON III is reportedly in the Lighter-than-Air Society's collection in Akron, Ohio.

== See also ==
Comparable aircraft: AEREON 26
