= Aereon =

American hybrid airship manufacturer

Aereon Logo

Aereon was an aircraft manufacturer specializing in hybrid airships. It was founded in Princeton, New Jersey in 1959.

== Aircraft ==
- AEREON III
- AEREON 26
- AEREON Dynairship
- Aereon WASP
