= Zeppelin LZ 120 Bodensee =

Type of aircraft

LZ 120 Bodensee
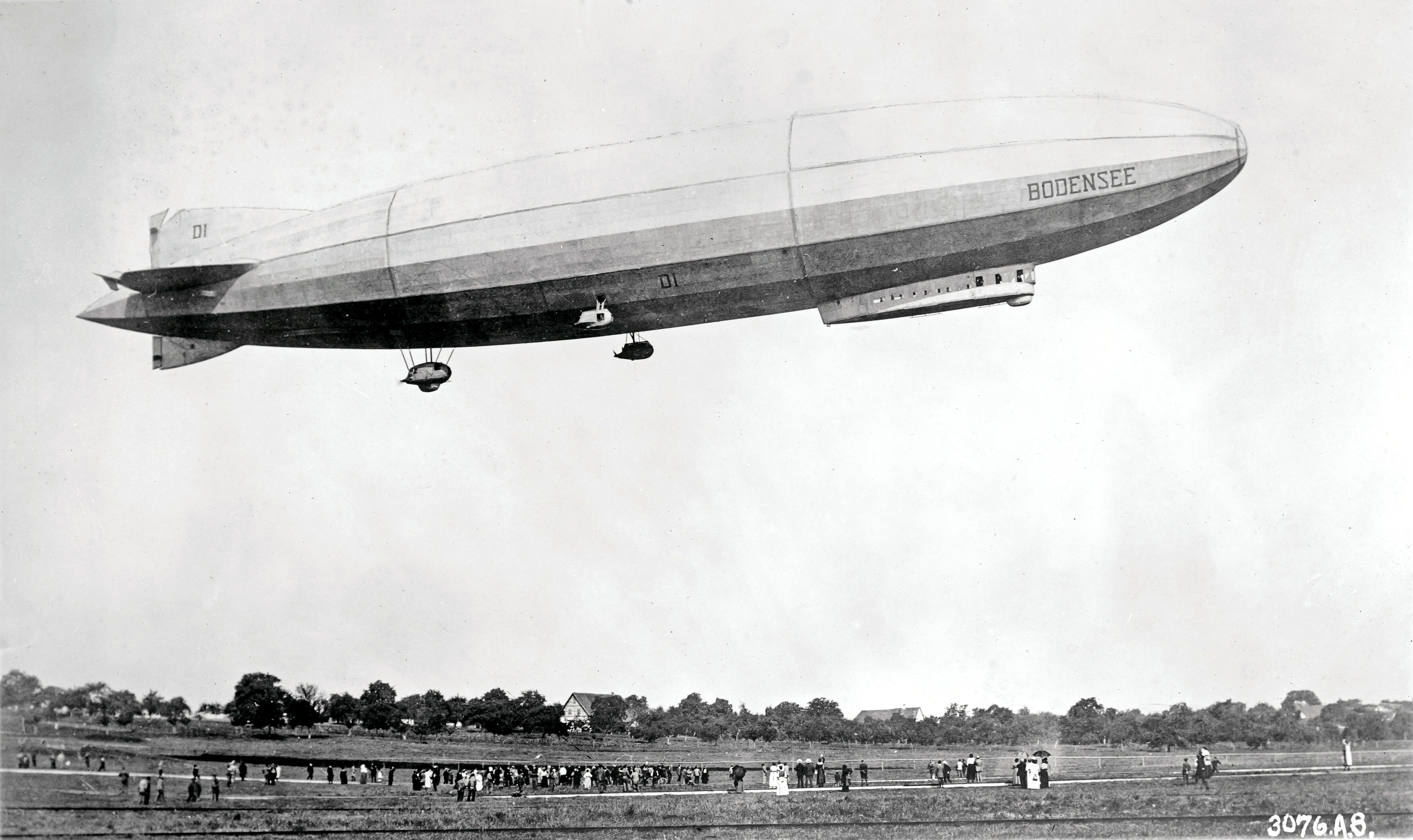

General information
- Type: Passenger airship
- National origin: Germany
- Manufacturer: Zeppelin Luftschiffbau
- Designer: Paul Jaray
- Primary user: DELAG

History
- First flight: 20 August 1919

LZ 120 Bodensee was a passenger-carrying airship built by Zeppelin Luftschiffbau in 1919 to operate a passenger service between Berlin and Friedrichshafen. It was later handed over to the Italian Navy as war reparations in place of airships that had been sabotaged by their crews and renamed Esperia. A sister-ship, LZ 121 Nordstern, was built in 1920: it was handed over to France and renamed Méditerranée.

== Design ==
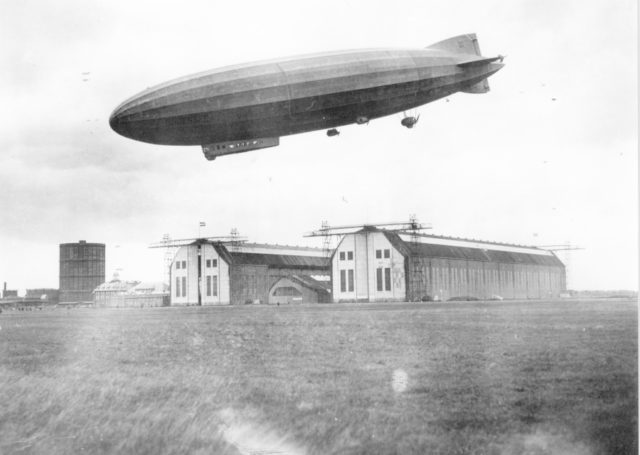
Zeppelin LZ 120 Bodensee arriving in Berlin on her maiden voyage from Friedrichshafen, a distance of about 450 miles (720 km), in six hours.

Bodensee, designed by Paul Jaray, had an innovative hull shape of relatively low fineness ratio, (ratio of length to diameter). This was arrived at after wind-tunnel tests conducted at the University of Göttingen had shown that this would reduce drag. The framework consisted of eleven 17-sided main transverse frames with a secondary ring frame in each bay, connected by longitudinal girders with a stiffening keel.

The forward-mounted control car was combined with the passenger accommodation and was constructed as an integral part of the hull structure rather than being suspended beneath it. Passenger accommodation consisted of five compartments seating four people and a VIP cabin for one. An additional six passengers could be carried on wicker chairs in the gangway between the compartments. A galley and toilets were also fitted.

It was powered by four 190 kW (260 hp) Maybach Mb.IVa engines, two in a centrally mounted aft gondola driving a single 5.2 m (17 ft 1 in) diameter two-bladed pusher propeller, the other two in a pair of amidships engine cars mounted either side of the hull. These drove 3.2 m (10 ft 6 in) two-bladed propellers via a reversing gearbox to enable reverse thrust for manoeuvering when landing.

A sister-ship LZ 121 Nordstern, similar to the lengthened Bodensee but with modified passenger accommodation, was completed in 1920.

== Operational history ==
Bodensee was first flown on 20 August 1919, piloted by Bernhard Lau. The first passenger-carrying flight was made on 24 August, with Hugo Eckener in command. Bodensee made over 100 flights, carrying 2,322 passengers over a total distance of 50,000 km (31,000 mi) These flights included a 17-hour voyage between Berlin and Stockholm.

On 3 November 1919, Bodensee suffered a partial engine failure, leading to an accident at Staaken when attempting to land. One of the ground handling crew was killed and several injured, and the airship, lightened after five passengers had jumped out, was then carried off by the wind and eventually brought down near Magdeburg.

Bodensee had suffered some minor damage in the accident, and while being repaired, she was also modified. The oversensitive controls were improved and the airship was lengthened by 10 m (32 ft 10 in).

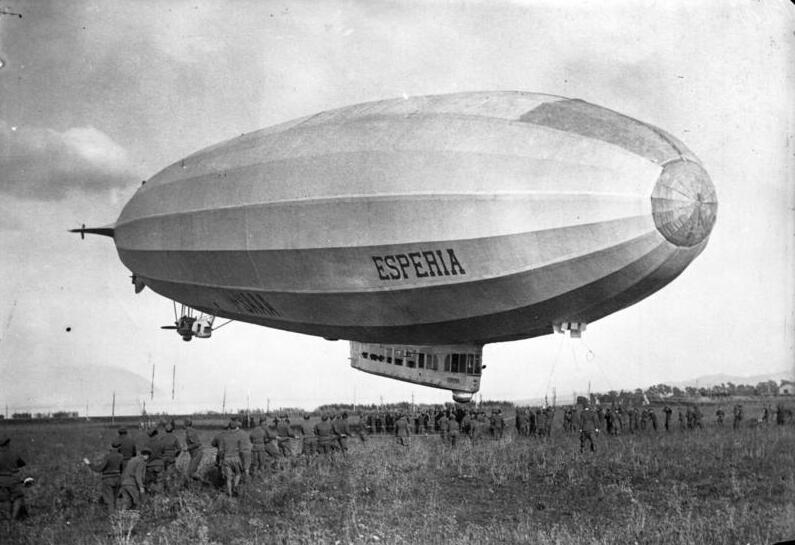
LZ 120 in Italian service as Esperia

In July 1921, Bodensee was handed over to the Italian government as compensation for the Zeppelins which were to have been handed over as war reparations but had been sabotaged by their crews. Two stowaways were aboard Bodensee during her flight to Rome: a German bank teller and an American cinematographer. Renamed Esperia, the Zeppelin made at least one long flight in Italian service, a 2,400 km (1,500 mi) voyage lasting 25 hours from Rome to Barcelona and Toulon before she was broken up for scrap in July 1928.

LZ 121 Nordstern, sister ship to Bodensee, was also covered by the reparations decided as part of the peace treaty of June 1919 and was confiscated by the Allies. Nordstern was delivered to France as a war reparation on 13 June 1921 and renamed Méditerranée.

== Specifications (after enlarging) ==
Data from The Lighter Than Air Society

General characteristics

- Crew: 12
- Capacity: 27
- Length: 120.8 m (396 ft 4 in)
- Diameter: 18.71 m (61 ft 5 in)
- Volume: 20,000 m^{3} (710,000 cu ft)
- Empty weight: 13,646 kg (30,084 lb)
- Useful lift: 9,593 kg (21,149 lb)
- Powerplant: 4 × Maybach Mb.IVa six cylinder inline piston engines, 190 kW (260 hp) each

Performance

- Maximum speed: 132.5 km/h (82.3 mph, 71.5 kn)
- Range: 1,700 km (1,100 mi, 920 nmi)
