= Joseph Spiess =

French engineer (1838–1917)

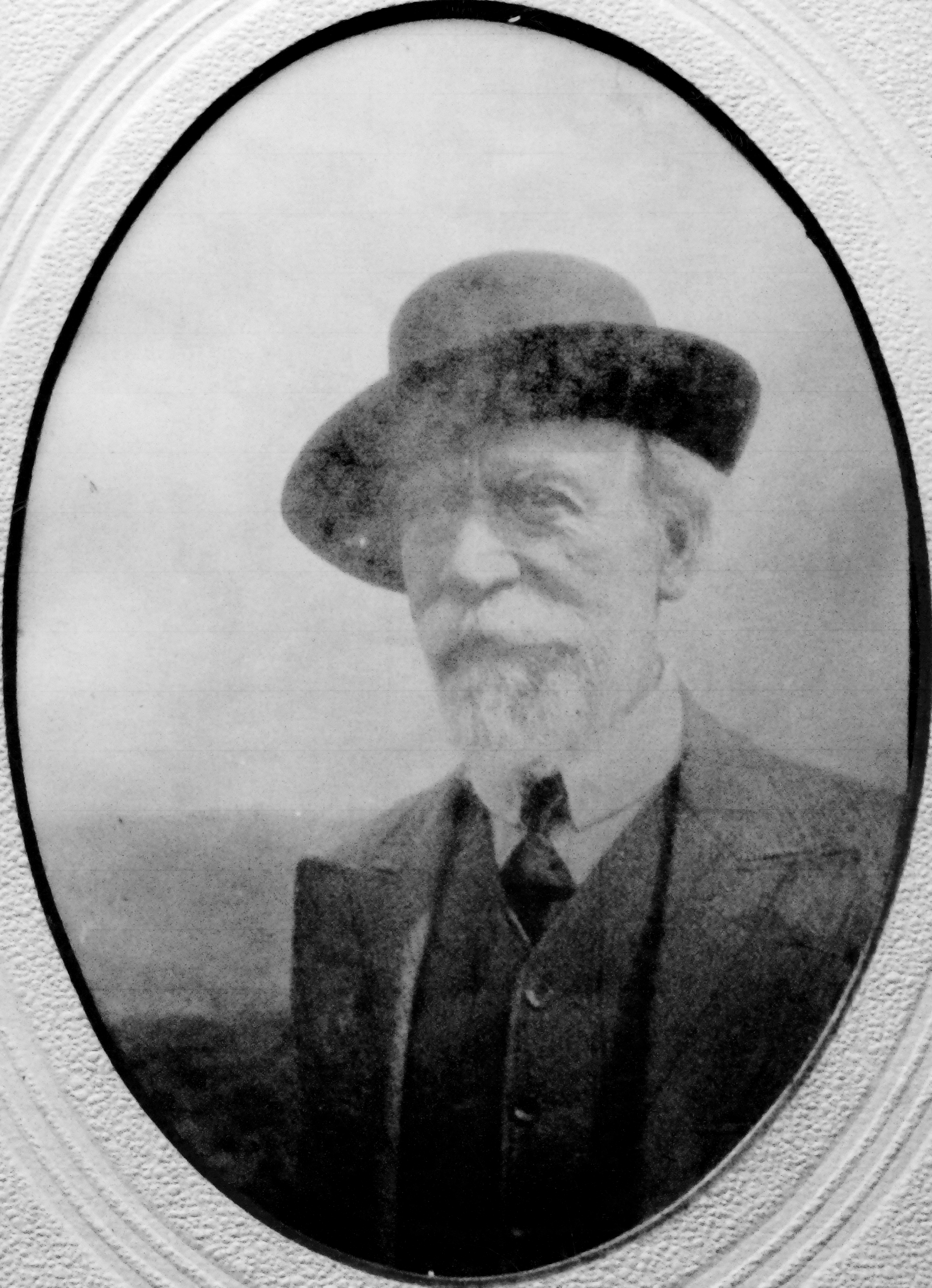
Portrait of Joseph Spiess (1838-1917)

Joseph Spiess (10 September 1838 – 31 March 1917) was a French engineer who filed a patent for a rigid airship in 1873, the year before Ferdinand von Zeppelin first outlined his own design. However, Spiess's machine was not actually constructed until 1913, and was the first and only French rigid airship.

== Biography ==
Spiess was the son of a printer, in Mulhouse, Haut-Rhin département, in the Alsace region of France. He served as a warrant officer in the Franco-Prussian War from 1870 to 1871, and when Alsace-Lorraine was annexed by the German Empire, Spiess opted to retain his French nationality.

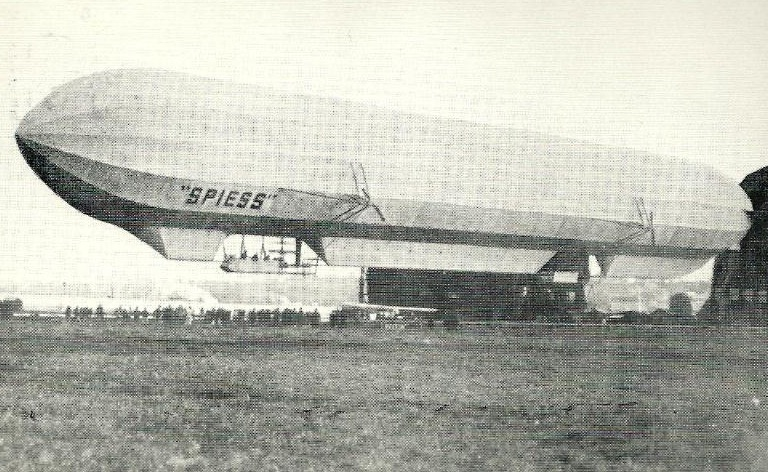
The extended Spiess airship in 1913.

Shortly before World War I, there was public pressure for France to emulate Germany's airship fleet, and construction of Spiess's airship, with state assistance, was started by Société Zodiac at the Aérodrome de Saint-Cyr-l'École. It had a framework of hollow wooden spars braced with wire, and was given the name Zodiac XII but had the name "SPIESS" painted along the side of the envelope. It was 113 metres long, with a diameter of 13.5 metres, powered by a single Chenu 200 horse power engine that drove two propellers. It first flew on April 13, 1913, but it became clear that it was underpowered and required more lift, so the envelope was extended to 140 metres to accommodate three more gas cells and a second engine was added. Spiess then presented the airship to the French government as a gift. After further trials, it was not accepted by the French military, because their view was smaller non-rigid types would be more effective. The Spiess airship seems to have been broken up in 1914.

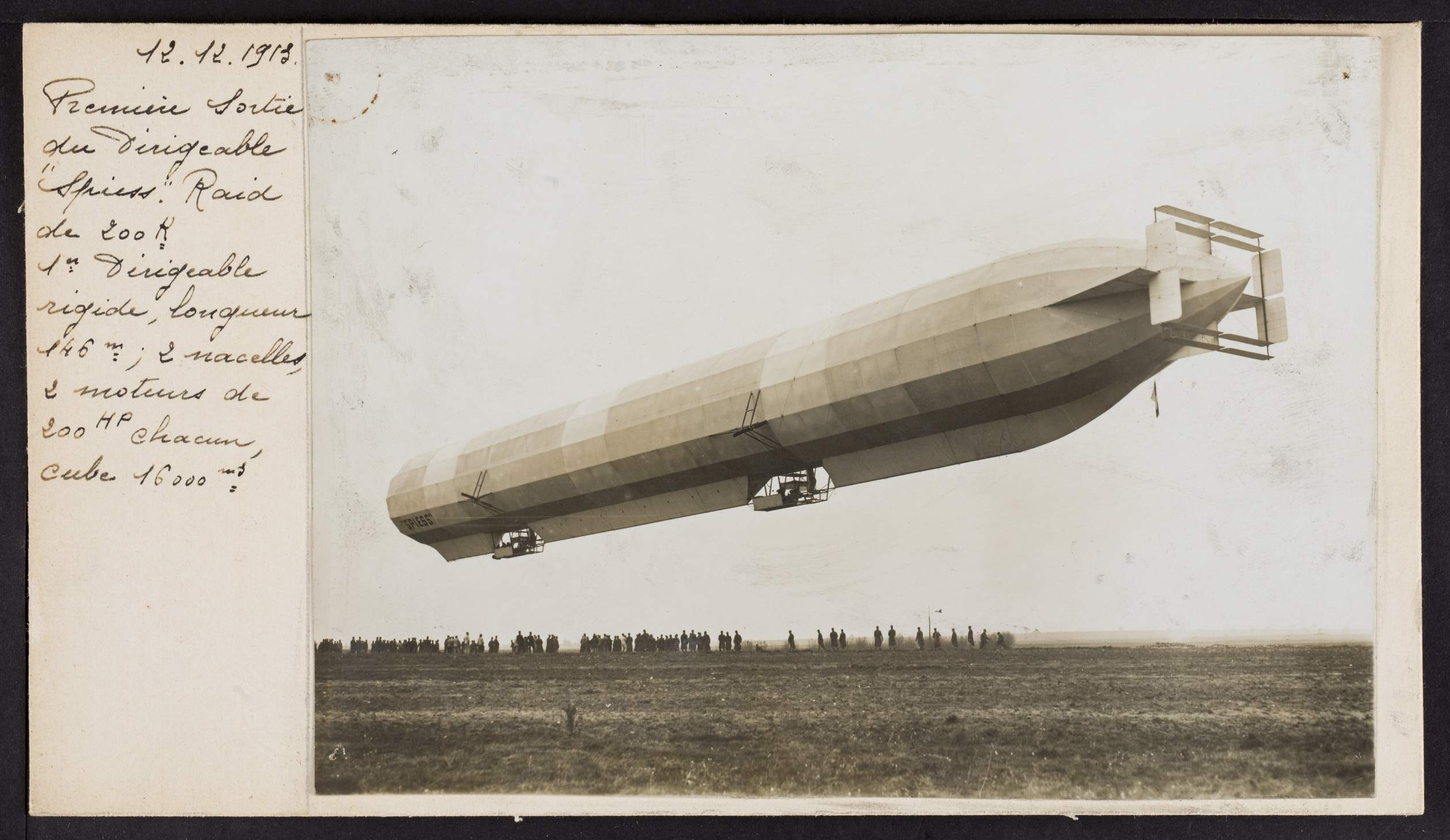
First outing of the airship, December 12, 1913. View from the rear. Caption reads: "First outing of the Spiess dirigible, 200km raid. Length 146m, 2 nacelles, 2 motors of 200 hp, cube of 16000 m^{3}"

The first appearance of the Spiess airship over Paris initially caused consternation as it was mistaken for a German Zeppelin; however, when it was found to be a French machine, Spiess became something of a national celebrity and was nominated for Chevalier of the Légion d'Honneur in June 1913.

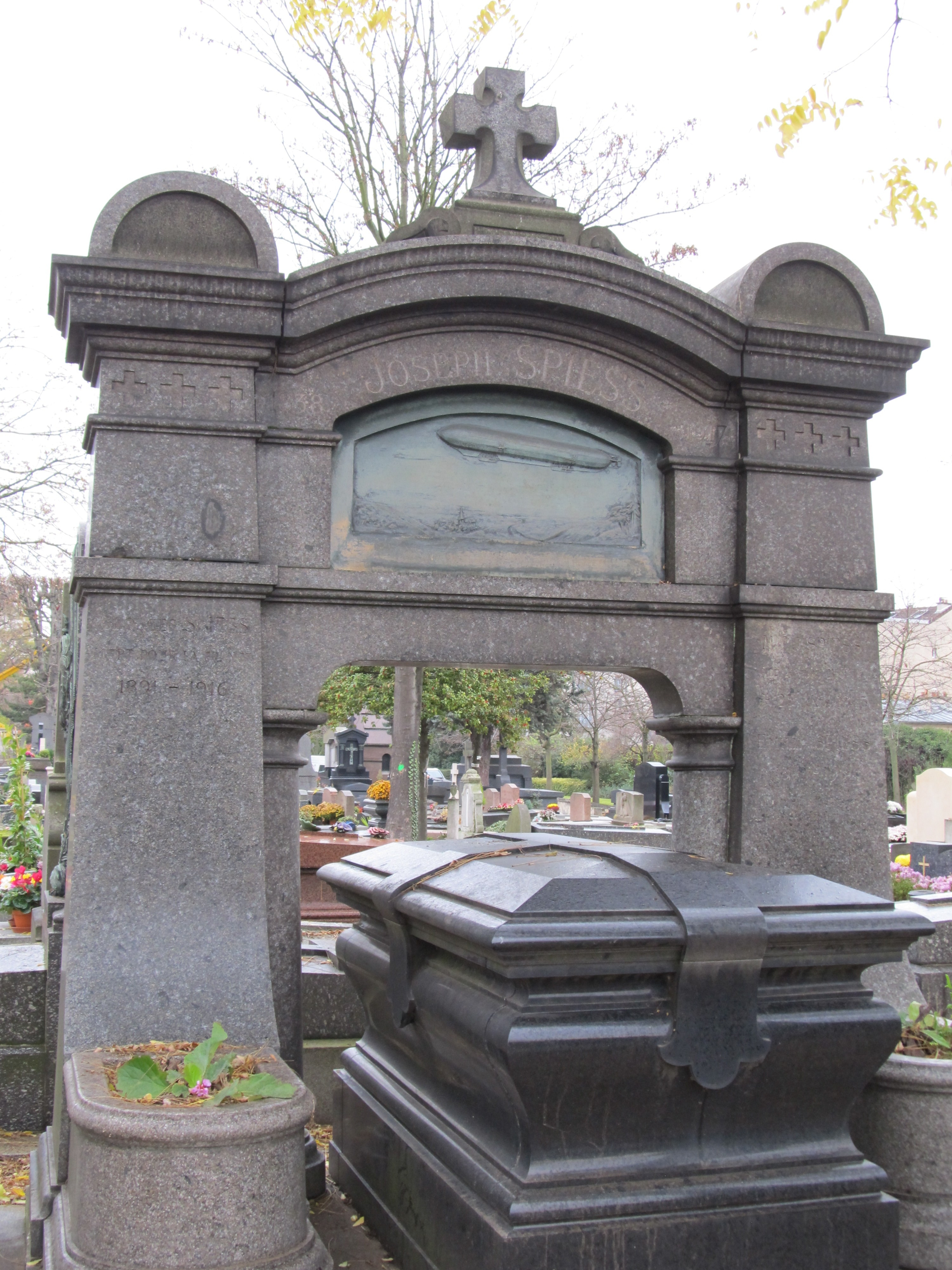
The tomb of the Spiess family at Pere-Lachaise cemetery, with a depiction of the Spiess airship.

Joseph Spiess is buried with other family members in the Cimetiere du Pere-Lachaise in Paris; his gravestone has a bronze frieze depicting his airship.
