= Aereon 26 =

US airship

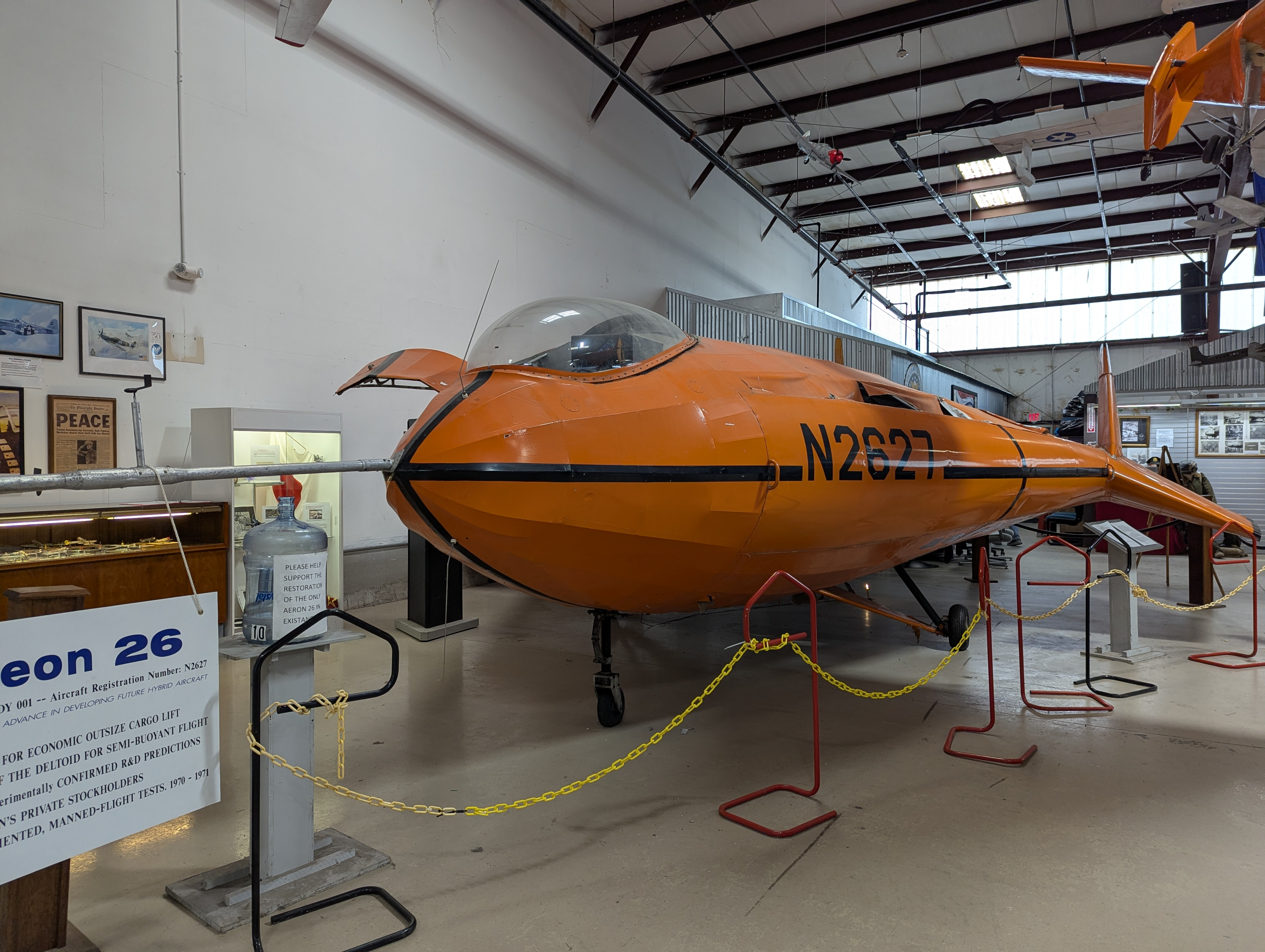

General information
- Type: lifting body aircraft
- National origin: United States of America
- Manufacturer: Aereon Corporation
- Number built: 1

History
- First flight: March 1971

The Aereon 26 (stylized as AEREON 26) was an experimental aircraft developed to investigate lifting body design with a view to using its shape to create hybrid designs, part airship, part conventional aircraft. It was powered by a piston engine, driving a pusher propeller, and generated lift through the aerodynamics of its lozenge-shaped fuselage.

Although results of flight tests conducted in 1971 were promising, funding for larger and semi-buoyant aircraft was not forthcoming at the time. The story of the test program was recounted by John McPhee in his book The Deltoid Pumpkin Seed (ISBN 0-374-51635-9). This aircraft has a special place in UFO and conspiracy lore, since enthusiasts have drawn parallels between the shape of this aircraft and some reported UFOs from around the same era.

== Background ==
The AEREON Corporation, established in 1959, at first concentrated on the construction of a prototype three-hull hybrid airship, the AEREON III. Completed in 1965, the prototype was lost during taxiing tests the following year, without having flown.

Following the destruction of the AEREON III, the firm sought "a new and better solution." AEREON's Monroe Drew and John Fitzpatrick employed German physicist Jürgen Bock, formerly of the Max Planck Institute for Nuclear Physics, Heidelberg, Germany, and the U.S. Army's Aberdeen Proving Ground, to develop a list of parameters that would be fed into a computer at the General Electric Space Center, Valley Forge, Pennsylvania, in order to determine "the optimum configuration for enclosing maximum volume without too much penalty of drag." AEREON 26's deltoid configuration, "a shrewd and practical compromise between an airfoil and a sphere," was the result of these efforts.

Rubber-powered and gasoline-engined models of the configuration were flown and wind tunnel tests conducted before testing of the 26 itself began.

== Description ==
=== Structure and form ===
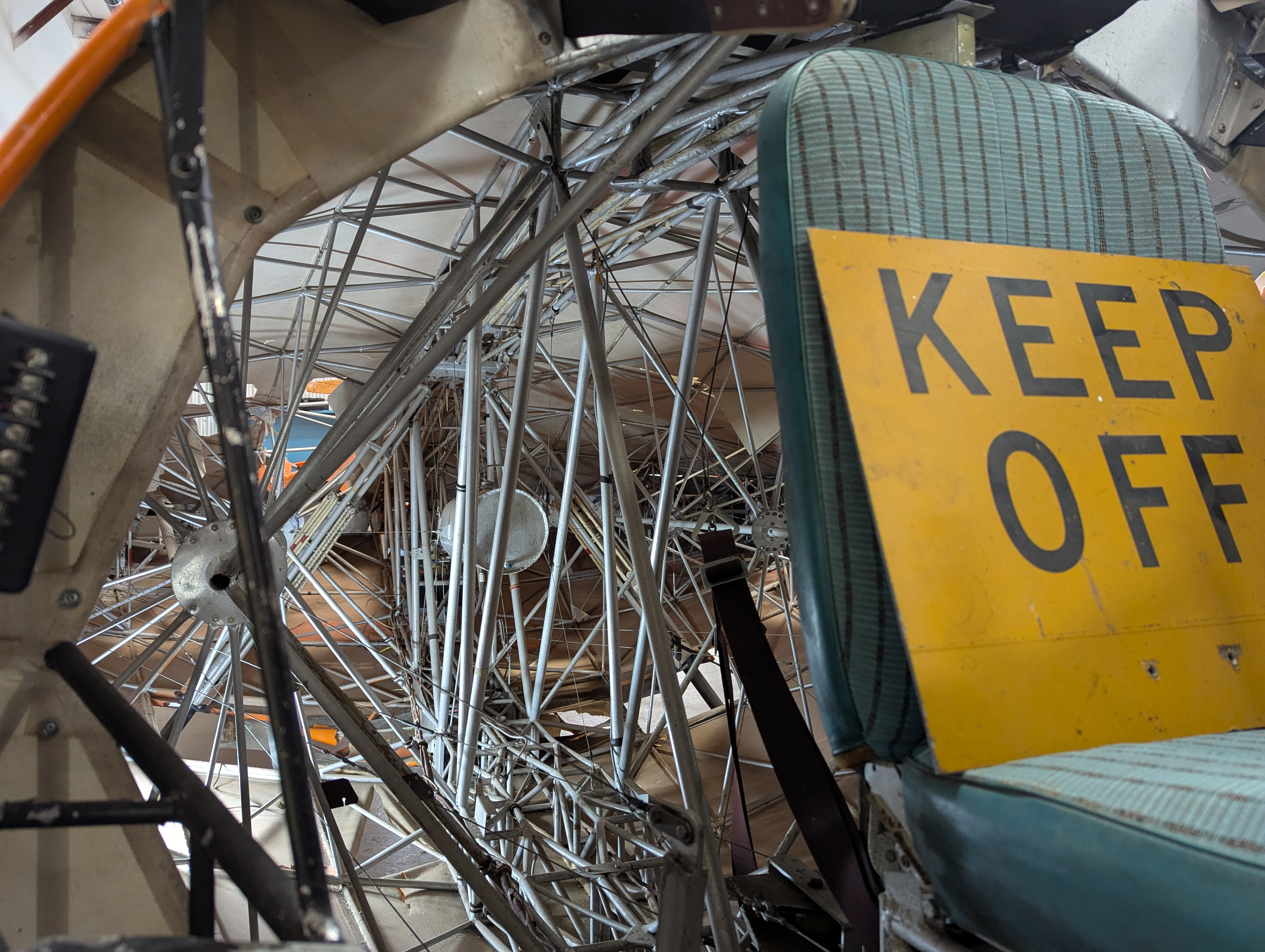
Interior of the Aereon 26

According to a paper delivered to the Interagency Workshop on Lighter than Air Vehicles in 1974 by AEREON president William Miller, the 26's shape—dubbed an "aerobody"—was "a lifting-body of deltoid planform, elliptical cross-sections, and a fineness ratio of 4:5." Among the advantages claimed for this hull form were proximity of the aerodynamic center, center of buoyancy, and center of gravity and a minimal need for trim-control devices, thus facilitating the transportation of "a full range of tonnages at various speeds without major trim requirements."

In McPhee's words, the craft was "a triangle with a deep belly and a vaulting back" or a "delta" when seen from above and a "fat and tremendous pumpkin seed" from the side (hence "deltoid pumpkin seed").

The 26's structure was composed of aluminum tubes (salvaged from the wrecked AEREON III), joined using heli-arc welding and covered with aircraft cloth and aluminum sheet.

=== Propulsion ===
The 26 was powered by a single engine, mounted above the trailing edge and driving a pusher propeller. Although the 26 inherited the engine of the AEREON III—apparently a four-cylinder McCulloch of 92 horsepower (69 kW)—it appears to have had three different propellers over the course of the test program. After the aircraft experienced difficulty in getting out of ground effect, "a propeller of a different pitch" was fitted. This second propeller was a "virtually unique" example, made of lemonwood, that had been used by Igor Bensen in an unsuccessful attempt on the autogyro speed record. After further testing indicated the 26 to be underpowered, a third propeller was carved to order from yellow birch by Sensenich Propeller and fitted in time for the 26's second series of flight tests in 1971.

The engine's lifespan also had a significant influence on the program; it was "just a drone-aircraft engine, and an old one at that" and had already been used for 12 hours of its 25-hour design life.

=== Construction and assembly ===
The 26 was assembled (like its predecessor) by veteran U.S. Navy airship rigger Everett Linkenhoker. Initial construction was in two portions, in "a small shop near Lakehurst, New Jersey." The portions were then transported by road to Red Lion Airport, where they were joined together. The aircraft was initially housed in a timber-and-sheetrock box within a hangar at the airport, for reasons of secrecy. Initial taxiing tests were conducted at Red Lion, again under conditions of secrecy. Subsequently, the aircraft was transported by road to the National Aviation Facilities Experimental Center (NAFEC) near Atlantic City for flight testing.

== Flying history ==
The 26 made its first flight, piloted by John Olcott (later president of the National Business Aviation Association), at NAFEC on September 7, 1970. However, as discussed above, it was initially unable to climb out of ground effect. By September 28, following the replacement of the propeller and the removal of some items, the 26 was capable of reaching an altitude of 50 feet (15 m) but appeared underpowered. The aircraft was returned to Red Lion before being hauled back to NAFEC on February 24, 1971, following the fitting of vortex generators and the third propeller.

Tests resumed at NAFEC on March 1, 1971. On this occasion, the 26 "went up and out of ground effect with no strain at all". In subsequent tests, it performed circuits of the field and a variety of other maneuvers before the engine's life expiry ended the test program.

== After the test program ==
=== Results of the program ===
Addressing the Interagency Workshop on Lighter than Air Vehicles in 1974, William Miller said the test program indicated that performance was as had been predicted, the 26's stability and control and handling qualities were "good," the aircraft was "docile and acceptable...within the limited scope of the tests," and the concept had been shown to be feasible, with the program potentially forming a basis for "realistic studies of much larger such aircraft."

=== Proposed further developments ===
==== Dynairships ====
The aircraft was intended as a forerunner of much larger craft that—unlike the 26 itself—would contain helium; these designs were dubbed "Dynairships." One proposal, the AEREON 340, was to have been 340 feet (100 m) long, with a wingspan of 256 feet (78 m) and total lift of 400,000 pounds (180,000 kg). Powered by four 5,500 horsepower (4,100 kW) Rolls-Royce Tyne turboprop engines, it was claimed to be capable of carrying intermodal containers or semi-trailers, operating slightly heavier than air. A patent for "[a] cargo-carrying air ship [sic] compris[ing] a gas-filled, low aspect ratio deltoid wing" was granted in 1969; according to this patent, "extremely large ships, having lengths in excess of 1,000 feet (300 m)" and capable of economically transporting "large payloads, ranging up to 1,000 long tons (1,000 t) or more" over long distances, were feasible.

In 1974, Miller described three "hypothetical Dynairships":

- A "small patrol aircraft" 50 feet (15 m) long, with a gross weight of 4,000 pounds (1,800 kg)
- A "medium-size cargo aircraft" 200 feet (61 m) long, with a gross weight of 270 long tons (270 t)
- A "logistic carrier" 1,000 feet (300 m) long, with a gross weight of 4,200 long tons (4,300 t).

==== Heavier-than-air ====
Versions of the configuration that would, like the 26, have lacked lifting gas and operated heavier-than-air at all times were also proposed. These included "a kind of flying camper for general aviation" and "a bigger model for the regional airline industry." A variant with a V/STOL capability, using blown flaps, was patented in 1979. Another heavier-than-air variant, later known as the Aereon WASP, is described in a 1990 patent. This "airborne surveillance antenna platform" with "long endurance and high altitude flight capability" was to carry a radar antenna comprising "planar or linear phased arrays arranged to scan in a continuous pattern in all azimuthal directions" within its deltoid hull.

=== Current status ===
William Miller was looking to donate the Aereon 26 to a museum since at least 2011. As of 2019 it has been added to the Air Victory Museum permanent collection and is on public display in Lumberton, New Jersey.

== Specifications ==
Data from Jane's All the World's Aircraft 1976–77

General characteristics

- Crew: 1
- Length: 27 ft 6 in (8.38 m) (excluding air data boom)
- Wingspan: 22 ft 3 3/4 in (6.80 m) (over anhedral surfaces)
- Height: 7 ft 3 3/4 in (2.23 m)
- Aspect ratio: 1.23:1
- Gross weight: 1,200 lb (544 kg) (operating weight)
- Powerplant: 1 × McCulloch flat-four, 90 hp (67 kW)
- Propellers: 4-bladed Sensenich

Performance

- Never exceed speed: 127 mph (204 km/h, 110 kn)
- Take-off run: 800 ft (240 m)
