= LZ 10 Schwaben =

1911 Zeppelin F class passenger airship

Zeppelin LZ 10 Schwaben
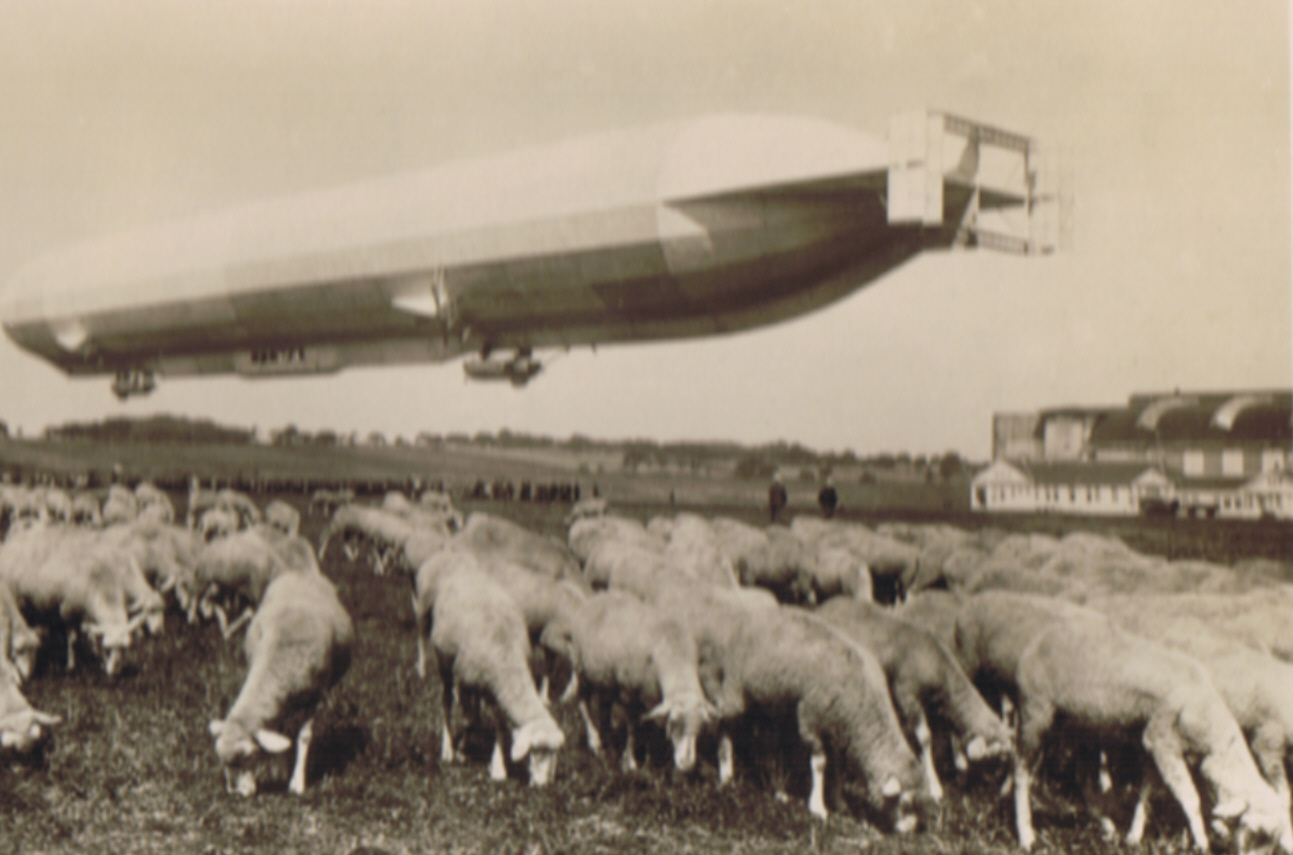

General information
- Type: Passenger airship
- National origin: Germany
- Manufacturer: Luftschiffbau Zeppelin
- Designer: Ludwig Dürr
- Primary user: DELAG
- Number built: 1

History
- First flight: 26 June 1911

LZ 10 Schwaben was a German rigid airship built by Luftschiffbau Zeppelin in 1911 and operated by DELAG (Deutsche Luftschiffahrts-Aktiengesellschaft) for passenger service. It is regarded as the first commercially successful passenger-carrying aircraft.

== Design ==
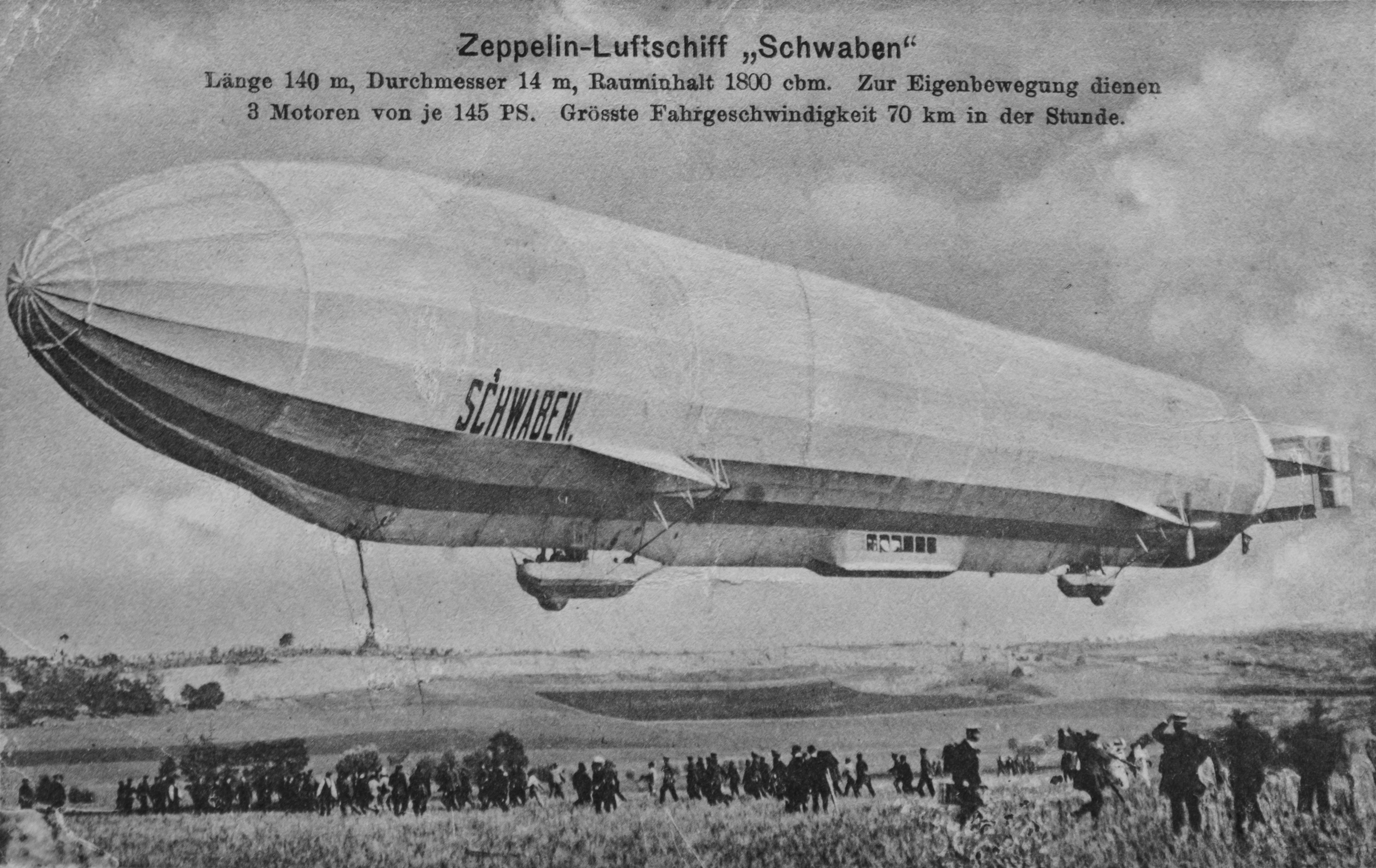
Schwaben on a postcard.

The Schwaben was 140.21 m (460 ft) long, 14 metres (46 ft) in diameter and had a lifting gas volume of 17,800 m^{3} (628,000 ft^{3}). It was powered by three 108 kW (145 hp) Maybach engines, giving a maximum speed of 76 km/h (47 mph). Schwaben was the first Zeppelin to use these engines, which were used to drive most later examples. The cylindrical hull structure was braced by a triangular keel running most of its length, which was widened amidships to accommodate the passenger cabin, which had a capacity of 20 people. Two gondolas were suspended from the keel; the forward one containing the control position and one engine, and the aft one containing the remaining two engines. The engines drove two pairs of aluminium-bladed propellers mounted on brackets either side of the hull.

== Operating history ==
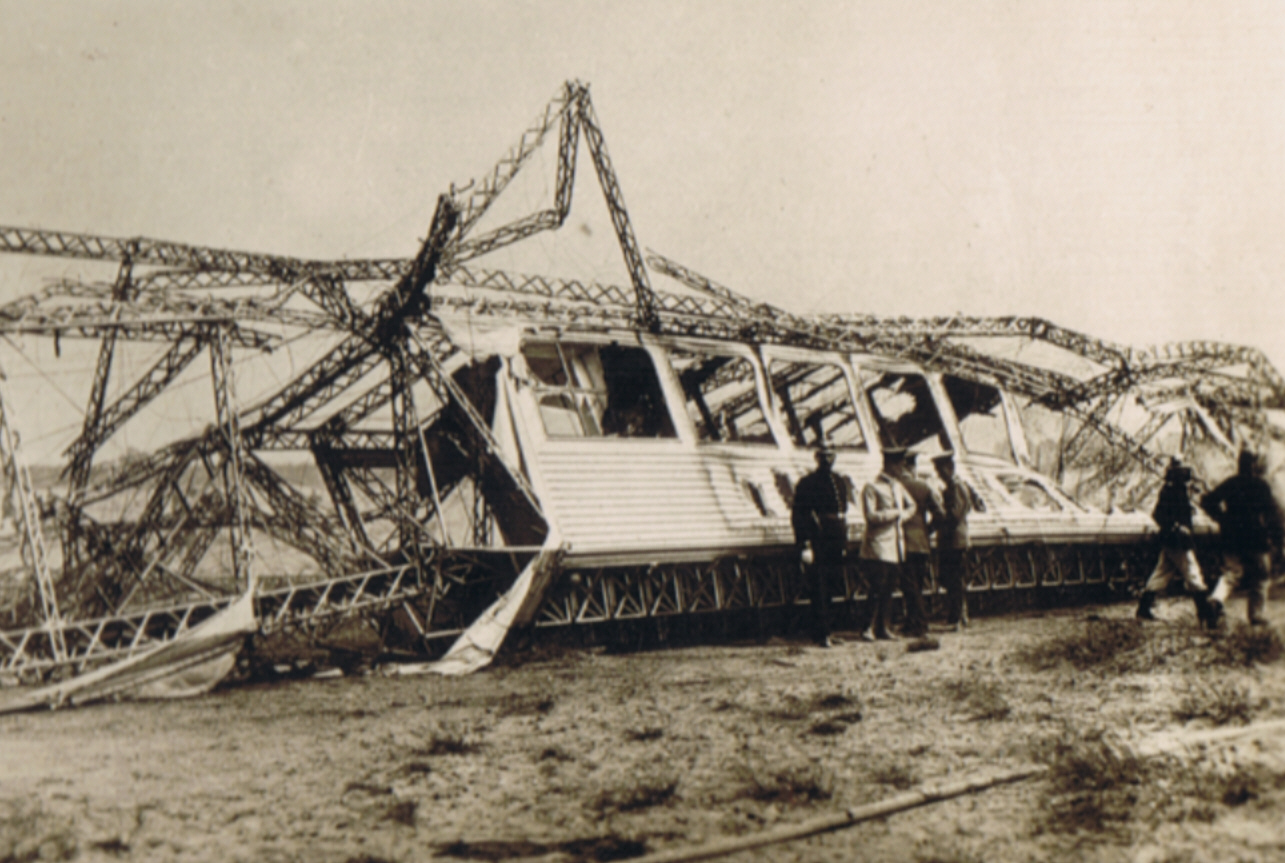
Wreckage of passenger car of Schwaben after the fire

The LZ 10 made its first flight on 26 June 1911 and was put into service three weeks later, on 16 July 1911. It was called the "lucky airship" because it was more successful than any of the previous craft that DELAG had put into service, and was the first commercially successful passenger aircraft in history. Over the course of the next year it made 218 flights, transporting 1,553 passengers. among whom were Crown Prince Wilhelm and his wife, Duchess Cecilie of Mecklenburg-Schwerin. The Prince, who had a pilot's license, travelled in the control car, while the Princess and her attendants occupied the passenger cabin for a flight over Berlin.

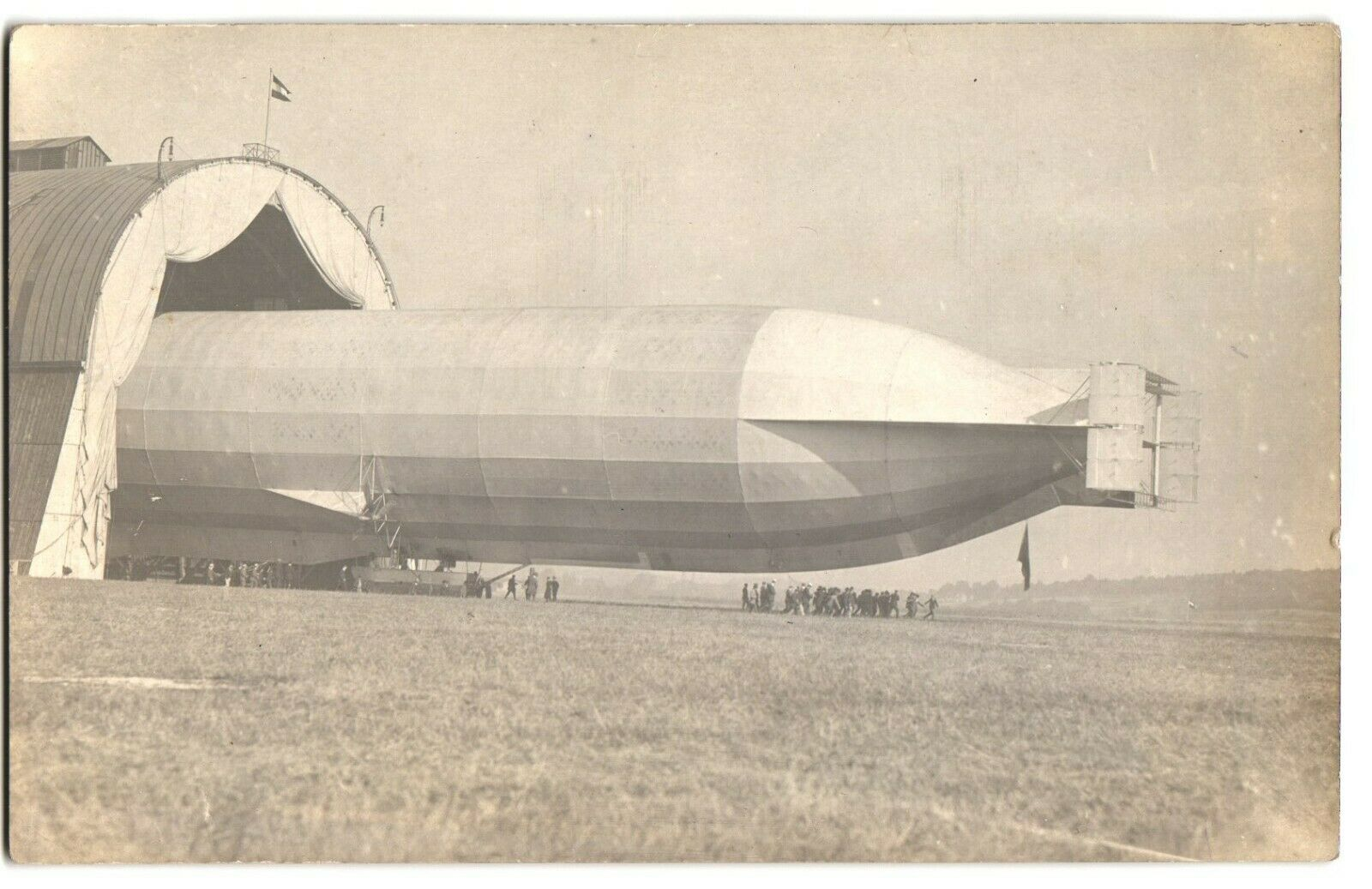
A real photo postcard showing the LZ 10 Schwaben being pulled out of a hangar

Schwaben was destroyed in a gale on 28 June 1912 at the airfield near Düsseldorf, The wind prevented it being put into its shed, and it broke loose from its moorings and broke its back. The hydrogen was ignited by spark caused by static electricity accumulated in the rubberised cotton gasbags: in moments the entire ship had been burnt. Sources differ regarding injuries suffered: the New York Times reported "34 soldiers were injured"; others claimed either 30 or 40 injured.

== Specifications ==
Data from Robinson 1973 p.330

General characteristics

- Crew: 13
- Capacity: 20
- Length: 140.21 m (460 ft 0 in)
- Diameter: 14.02 m (46 ft 0 in)
- Volume: 17,800 m^{3} (630,000 cu ft)
- Powerplant: 3 × Maybach C-X 6-cylinder inline piston engines , 108 kW (145 hp) each

Performance

- Maximum speed: 77 km/h (47 mph, 41 kn)
- Range: 1,400 km (900 mi, 780 nmi)

== See also ==
- List of Zeppelins
- Post-Luftschiff Schwaben über Offenbach am Main 1912. Commons
