= DELAG =

German airship airline and the world's first airline

- Founded: 16 November 1909; 116 years ago
- Commenced operations: 19 June 1910; 116 years ago
- Ceased operations: 1935; 91 years ago
- Operating bases: Düsseldorf, Germany; Baden-Baden, Germany
- Fleet size: See Airships below
- Destinations: Berlin; See Transatlantic service below
- Key people: Alfred Colsman (founding general director)

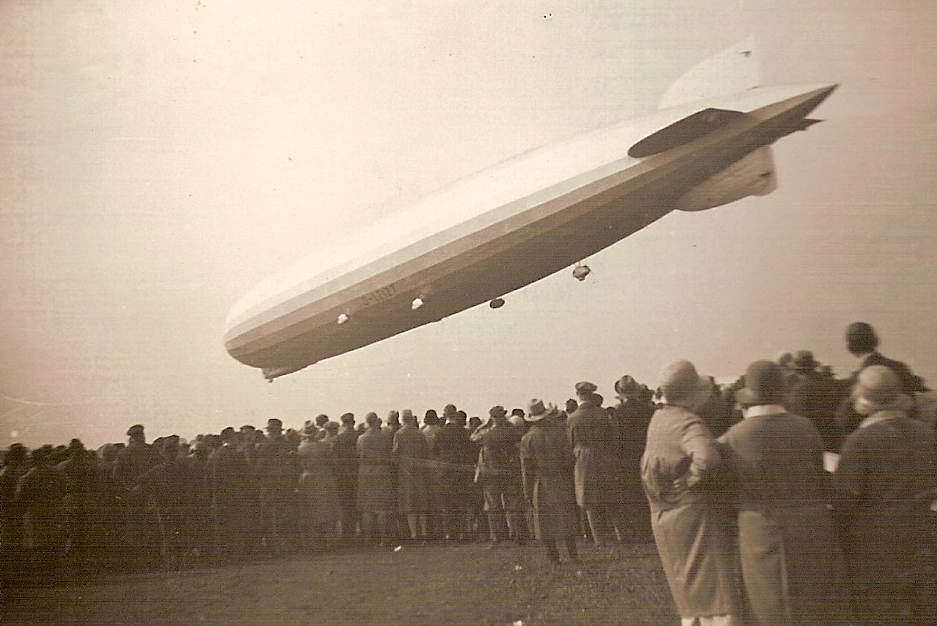
The LZ 127 Graf Zeppelin

DELAG, acronym for Deutsche Luftschiffahrts-Aktiengesellschaft (German for "German Airship Travel Corporation"), was the world's first airline to use an aircraft in revenue service. It operated a fleet of zeppelin rigid airships manufactured by the Luftschiffbau Zeppelin Corporation. Its headquarters were located in Frankfurt, Germany.

DELAG was founded on 16 November 1909 as a commercial passenger-carrying offshoot of Zeppelin Luftschiffbau. While the notion did not have the support of Zeppelin inventor Count Ferdinand von Zeppelin, Zeppelin Luftschiffbau business manager Alfred Colsman gained both funding and promotion for passenger flights from Albert Ballin, the head of the Hamburg America Line. On 19 June 1910, DELAG's first zeppelin, designated LZ 7 and named Deutschland, performed its first flight. Despite its loss on 28 June 1910, the company launched the improved Deutschland II and the LZ 10 Schwaben during the following year. It carried 1,553 paying passengers during its commercial career. By July 1914, one month prior to the start of the First World War, DELAG's Zeppelins had transported a total of 34,028 passengers on 1,588 commercial flights; over these trips, the fleet had accumulated 172,535 km (107,208 miles) across 3,176 hours of flight.

The company's zeppelins were requisitioned by the German Army for military use during the First World War. Shortly after the conflict, DELAG quickly set about relaunching commercial zeppelin operations, however, it was delivered a major setback when two of its airships were surrendered during 1921 as a part of Germany's war reparations. During 1925, restrictions imposed on zeppelin construction under the Treaty of Versailles were relaxed by the Allies, enabling the development of an advanced zeppelin suitable for intercontinental air passenger service. This airship, the LZ 127 Graf Zeppelin, was flown for the first time on 18 September 1928. Its introduction enabled DELAG to launch regular, nonstop, transatlantic flights several years before airplanes would be capable of sufficient range to cross the ocean in either direction without stopping. The airship also performed numerous record-breaking flights, including a successful circumnavigation of the globe.

DELAG's fortunes were badly damaged by the rise of the Nazis to power in Germany during 1933. During 1935, a rival company, the German Zeppelin Transport Company (DZR) was established with state sponsorship, and political interference led to Zeppelin Luftschiffbau being unable to continue operating DELAG.

== Beginnings ==
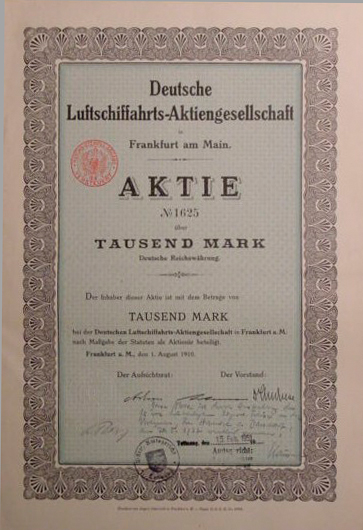
DELAG share certificate, 1910

DELAG was founded at the suggestion of Alfred Colsman, the business manager of Zeppelin Luftschiffbau. The company was having difficulty in obtaining orders from the German Army, so Colsman suggested exploiting the German public's enthusiastic interest by establishing a commercial passenger-carrying company. Count Ferdinand von Zeppelin himself distanced himself from this commercialisation of the airship: as an aristocrat and ex-officer, he regarded the concept as being a vulgar tradesman's enterprise. Despite this, Colsman, who became the airline's first general director, managed to secure the cooperation of Albert Ballin, the head of the Hamburg America Line who offered 100,000 Marks per year to promote the enterprise on the condition that his offices had exclusive rights to sell tickets, and Colsman had little difficulty in raising the necessary 3 million marks capital. Much of the initial capital came from the cities of Frankfurt am Main and Düsseldorf, while a number of other cities constructed their own airship sheds at their own expense.

The first zeppelin to be constructed for the company was LZ 7, which was named Deutschland. First flown on 19 June 1910, it had a useful lift of 5,000 kg (11,000 lb) and had accommodation for 24 passengers. Cruising speed was 51 km/h (32 mph). Given this performance, it was realised that scheduled inter-city services would not be feasible, and that the company would be limited to offering pleasure cruises in the vicinity of their bases. However, the Deutschland was destroyed on 28 June 1910 while taking a consignment of journalists on a trip intended to generate publicity. The airship was first prevented from returning to its base in Düsseldorf and then, caught by a thunderstorm, was first carried up to a height of 1,100 m (3,500 ft) and then, heavy from loss of hydrogen caused by the rapid ascent and from rainwater on the envelope, forced down into the Teutoburger forest. Despite the zeppelin's loss, the incident only resulted in a single injury.

The destruction of the Deutschland left DELAG with only a single operational airship, LZ 6, which had been constructed during the previous year with the hope of its being bought by the army; it was subsequently enlarged and modified for passenger-carrying purpose. Operating from Baden-Baden, successful flights were made almost daily between late August and mid-September but, on 14 September, it was destroyed in a fire while in its hangar. It was insured, and DELAG could complete its next ship, LZ 8 Deutschland II.

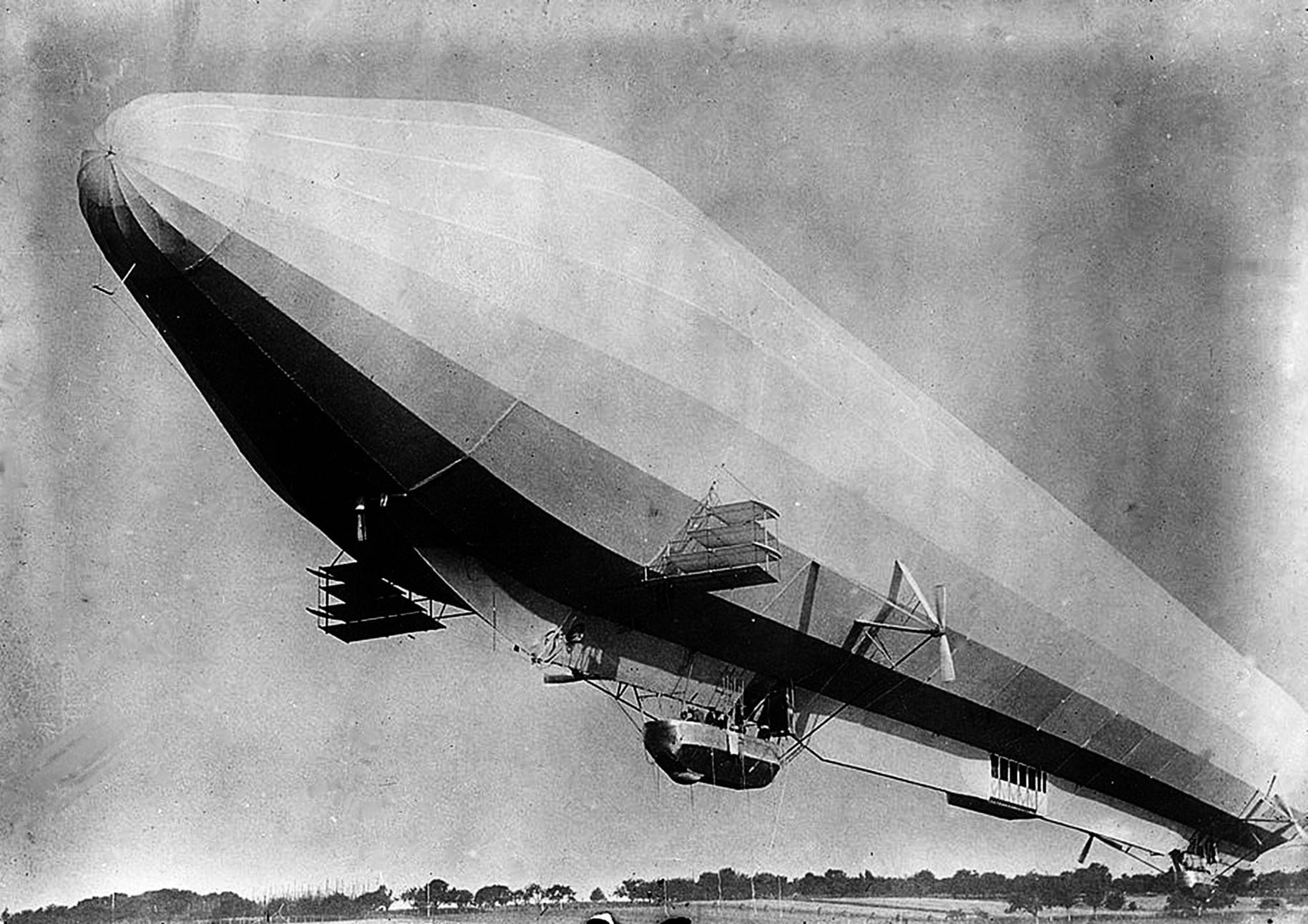
LZ 7 Deutschland

For the new season, flights lasting between 90 minutes and 2 hours were offered for a price of 200 Dm. Deutschland II was completed on 30 March 1911, and arrived at Düsseldorf on 11 April. However, its service life would be very brief as, little more than a month of service, it was caught by a gust while being walked out of its hangar on 16 May: it was driven onto a 15 m (49 ft) high windbreak and broke its back. The passengers had to be rescued using fire ladders. Hugo Eckener, the captain, attributed the accident to his "weak-kneed" decision to let the eagerness of the passengers to fly overcome his reluctance to take the ship out in the existing conditions.

The company's fortunes changed with its next airship, the LZ 10 Schwaben. Completed on 26 June and delivered to DELAG on 15 July, it carried 1,553 paying passengers during its career. Initially based at Baden Baden, the ship made a number of long-distance flights in addition to the pleasure cruises, carrying passengers to Frankfurt, Düsseldorf and eventually to Berlin. LZ 11 Viktoria Luise, named after the Kaiser's daughter, entered service on 4 March 1912. On 28 June 1912 Schwaben was destroyed in a hangar fire attributed to static electricity produced by its rubberised cotton gasbags, but was soon replaced by LZ 13 Hansa, which was completed on 30 July. These airships were also used by the Imperial German Navy for crew training, with the Navy crews operating passenger flights. In 1913, LZ 17 Sachsen was added to the fleet.

By July 1914, one month prior to the start of the First World War, DELAG's Zeppelins had transported a total of 34,028 passengers on 1,588 commercial flights; over these trips, the fleet had accumulated 172,535 km (107,208 miles) across 3,176 hours of flight.

== The First World War and immediate aftermath ==
Shortly after the start of the First World War, DELAG's zeppelin fleet was pressed into service to aid Germany's war effort. LZ 11, LZ 13, and LZ 17 were all operated by the German Army.

Following the conflict's end, DELAG quickly set about relaunching its commercial zeppelin operations. Initially, the company intended to use both LZ 120 Bodensee and LZ 121 Nordstern to help reconnect the cities of Europe. LZ 120 begun flights between Friedrichshafen and Berlin-Staaken with a stopover in Munich. However, DELAG was delivered a major setback when both airships were surrendered to the Allies during 1921 as a part of Germany's war reparations: LZ 120 was delivered to Italy and was re-christened Esperia, while LZ 121 became France's Méditerranée before it could ever enter service with DELAG.

Even more damning was a stipulation in the Treaty of Versailles under which Germany was not allowed to construct military aircraft and the only airships permitted had to be less than 28,000 m^{3} (1,000,000 ft^{3}). Prior to the treaty's enactment, Zeppelin Luftschiffbau had plans to develop larger airships, with DELAG being the intended principal operator of such enhanced types. These restrictions would be relaxed by the Allies during 1925, enabling Hugo Eckener, the chairman of Zeppelin Luftschiffbau, to pursue his vision of developing a zeppelin suitable for launching an intercontinental air passenger service. Eckener approached the German government, seeking not only their sanction for building a new civilian zeppelin, but also to finance the endeavour. The sum of 2.5 million Reichsmarks (ℛℳ, the equivalent of US$600,000 at the time, or $11 million in 2018 dollars), was raised via public subscription, while the government granted over ℛℳ 1 million ($5 million) for the project.

== Launch of Transatlantic services ==
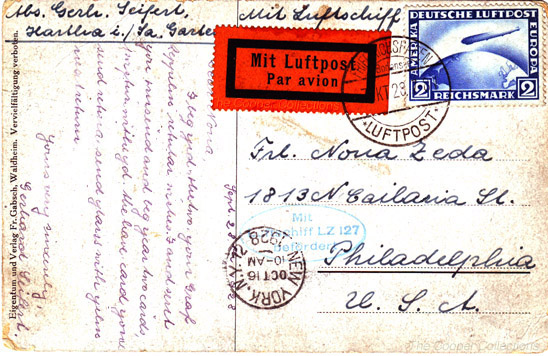
Flown picture postcard from the "First North American Flight" of the D-LZ127 (1928)

On 18 September 1928, the completed LZ 127 Graf Zeppelin flew for the first time. Shortly thereafter, DELAG began operating the airship, which enabled the company to launch regular, nonstop, transatlantic flights several years before airplanes would be capable of sufficient range to cross the ocean in either direction without stopping. For DELAG's first transatlantic trip, Dr. Eckener personally commanded the Graf Zeppelin on its departure from Friedrichshafen, Germany, at 07:54 on 11 October 1928; it arrived at Lakehurst Field, New Jersey, on 15 October. During 1931, the Graf Zeppelin began offering regular scheduled passenger service between Germany and South America which continued until 1937. During its career, Graf Zeppelin crossed the South Atlantic 136 times. The airship also performed numerous record-breaking flights, including a successful circumnavigation of the globe.

== Political restructuring ==
DELAG's fortunes were greatly influenced by the rise of the Nazis to power in Germany during 1933. During 1935, the state-sponsored Deutsche Zeppelin-Reederei (DZR) was established. Nazi Germany decided that the zeppelin would be an able platform for conducting prominent aerial propaganda campaigns; these were alleged to have had a noticeable effect upon the general populace. As a consequence of accepting 11 million marks from Goebbels' Ministry of Propaganda and Göring's Air Ministry, the company was effectively restructured; while Luftschiffbau Zeppelin continued to design and manufacture its airships, they would be operated by the rival DZR (which was not only heavily influenced by the Nazi government but also affiliated with Luft Hansa). While Eckener officially served as the head of both entities, in practice, Ernst Lehmann, who was less opposed to the Nazi regime, operated the DZR himself.

The DZR's fleet included not only the ex-DELAG LZ 127 Graf Zeppelin, but several newer and larger zeppelins, including the LZ 129 Hindenburg and LZ 130 Graf Zeppelin II. Following the high-profile Hindenburg disaster on 6 May 1937, the fortunes of the zeppelin sharply declined. During 1938, Luftschiffbau Zeppelin was compelled to terminate Zeppelin manufacturing, while all operations of existing airships ceased within two years. The frames of Graf Zeppelin and Graf Zeppelin II, along with scrap material from the Hindenburg, were subsequently scrapped that same year for their materials, which were used to fulfil wartime demands for fixed-wing military aircraft for the Luftwaffe.

During 2001, a modern firm also named Deutsche Zeppelin Reederei was established as a subsidiary of Zeppelin Luftschifftechnik GmbH (ZLT). It operates the Zeppelin NT airships from Friedrichshafen at Lake Constance, mainly for sightseeing flights around Germany.

== Airships ==
Prior to World War I:

- LZ 6
- LZ 7 Deutschland
- LZ 8 Deutschland II
- LZ 10 Schwaben
- LZ 11 Viktoria Luise
- LZ 13 Hansa
- LZ 17 Sachsen

Following World War I:

- LZ 120 Bodensee (Lake Constance)
- LZ 121 Nordstern (North Star)
- LZ 127 Graf Zeppelin, the last airship used by DELAG

In March 1935 the LZ 127 was transferred to the newly founded Deutsche Zeppelin-Reederei company, which also received as start capital the Hindenburg, which was at the time under construction.
