= Metal-clad airship =

Type of non-rigid airship

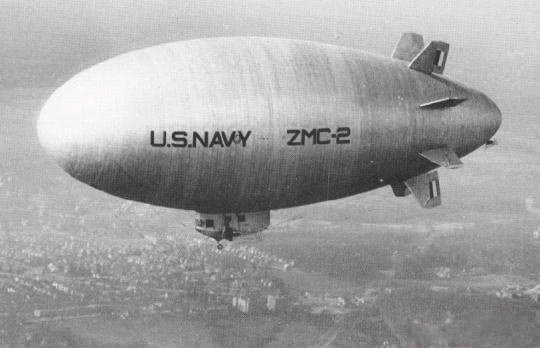
ZMC-2

Metal-clad airships are airships which have a very thin airtight metal envelope, rather than the usual fabric envelope. This shell may be either internally braced as with the designs of David Schwarz, or monocoque as in the ZMC-2. Only four ships of this type are known to have been built, and only two actually flew: Schwarz's aluminum ship of 1893 collapsed on inflation; Schwarz's second airship flew at Tempelhof, Berlin in 1897, landed but then collapsed; the ZMC-2 flew 752 flights between 1929 and scrapping in 1941; while the Slate City of Glendale, was built in 1929 but never flew.

== History ==
=== Early designs ===
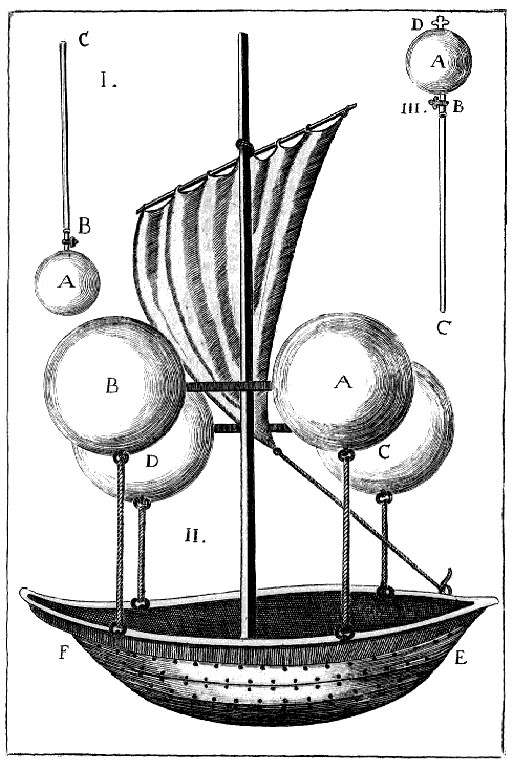
Francesco Lana de Terzi's airship c.1670

One of the earliest proposals for a flying machine based on rational principles was Francesco Lana de Terzi's design for a vacuum airship, c.1670. He had measured the pressure of air at sea level and based on this he proposed the first scientifically credible lifting medium in the form of hollow metal spheres from which all the air had been pumped out. His proposed methods of controlling height are still widely used; carrying ballast which may be dropped overboard to gain height, and venting the lifting containers to lose height. In practice de Terzi's spheres would have collapsed under air pressure, and further developments had to wait for more practicable lifting gases.

The concept of a metal-clad dirigible airship was again explored in the late 1800s by Russian rocket theorist Konstantin Eduardovich Tsiolkovsky. He wrote that since his teens (in the early 1870s) "the idea of the all-metal aerostat has never left my mind" and by 1891 he had produced detailed designs of a variable volume corrugated metal envelope airship that did not need ballonets. These were submitted to an Imperial department for aeronautics, which convened a conference to consider it. In 1891 they declined his request for a grant to produce a model, considering the idea "cannot have any considerable practical importance". In 1892 he published his designs as Aerostat Metallitscheski (the all-metal dirigible aerostat).

At around the same time, in 1892 the Russian Imperial war ministry agreed to let Schwarz build his metal airship in St Petersburg, though at his own expense.

=== Schwarz ===
Schwarz's first aluminum ship of 1893 collapsed on inflation. His second airship flew at Tempelhof, Berlin in 1897, landed but then collapsed.

=== Aircraft Development Corporation ===
In 1926 the Aircraft Development Corporation announced in Detroit, USA, that they were planning to construct a prototype.

=== Slate All-Metal Airship ===
The 1929 Slate All-Metal Airship, built in Glendale, California, had a hull constructed from corrugated aluminum panels, along with a revolutionary propulsions system consisting of a "blower" at the nose of the airship which would propel the vehicle forward by creating a partial vacuum ahead of the vessel. The centrifugal propulsion was later replaced by a conventional engine and propeller mounted on the tail end of the airship's gondola. The rolled seams intended to hold the panels together subsequently unrolled owing to gas pressure created by superheating during an attempted launch of the airship.

=== ZMC-2 ===
The U.S. Navy's ZMC-2 was one of the few airships to be constructed in the late 1920s. Like the Schwarz airship of the 1890s, the ZMC-2 had a system of framework integrated with stressed-skin construction that presaged both the pressurized fuselage construction used decades later in commercial airliners, and even elements of American lunar rockets, such as the Saturn V launch vehicle.

The ZMC-2 was successful both in performance and longevity. Its manufacture required the development of a riveting machine and final assembly that are comparable to later rockets and transport aircraft fuselages, while being capable of dealing with aluminum skin thicknesses thin enough to allow aerostatic lift. The final assembly of the single closing seam of the two hull-halves took over two months. Filling the rigid shell was similarly problematic, requiring an expensive and time-consuming process of filling it first with carbon dioxide, then with helium, and finally purifying the helium by scrubbing residual carbon dioxide from the helium. In addition, the hull had to be strengthened to sustain the weight of the carbon dioxide during the filling process.

=== LZ-132 ===
In the early 1950s, Luftschiffbau-Zeppelin GmbH commissioned a design study to explore the construction of the LZ-132. The project was abandoned.

=== American Skyship Industries ===
Between 1982 and 1995, American Skyship Industries, a subsidiary of Wren Skyships Ltd. of the Isle of Man in Great Britain and itself a spinoff from Airship Industries, promoted its metal-clad airship projects in the USA, receiving substantial state loans but never delivering a product.

=== Varialift Airships ===
An aerostatic design from the company Varialift Airships PLC in the UK has designed an aluminium monocoque outer structure and internal skeleton, together with a patented buoyancy mechanism that it claims can allow it to operate at high altitudes and therefore fly faster than current designs, at lower fuel consumption levels than hybrids since no energy is needed to generate lift, only to power the craft forward.
