= George Spyrou =

A Fujifilm airship over the Statue of Liberty.

George Andrew Rankin Spyrou (14 April 1949 – 27 February 2010) was a Scottish businessman. Spyrou was the president of Airship Management Services (AMS) and had affiliations with other airship companies.

== Early life and education ==
Born in Glasgow, Scotland, Spyrou attended Cranleigh School in England and King School, Connecticut, before entering Harvard University. He obtained his law degree from Christ's College, Cambridge, graduating in 1973, and specialized in international and maritime law. He was admitted to the English Bar (Inner Temple) in 1980. He worked for law firms in New York City then as a corporate counsel in Monaco.

== Career ==
The Spirit of Dubai over Big Ben in London.

Spyrou began work for Airship Industries Ltd. (AIL) in 1982, and he moved to the United States to head international operations for AIL's commercial clients in 1987.

AIL went into receivership in September 1990 under heavy financial pressure, and its assets were eventually obtained by Northrop Grumman. Spyrou founded AMS three months later, with the financial support of Sojitz, Fujifilm, and TCom.

AMS is headquartered in Greenwich, Connecticut, and has a FAA repair station and technical facility in Elizabeth City, North Carolina. The company specializes in airship advertising campaigns, and has run successful campaigns for several corporate and government clients.

Spyrou was a member of Inner Temple, the Airship Association (UK), the American Institute of Aeronautics and Astronautics, and was active in Harvard and Christ's College affairs.
