= Spyrou =

Spyrou (Σπύρου) is a Greek surname. Notable people with the name include:

- Athenagoras I (Spyrou) of Constantinople (1886–1972), Greek Orthodox Archbishop, Ecumenical Patriarch of Constantinople
- Artemis Spyrou, Cypriot experimental nuclear astrophysicist, professor at Michigan State University
- Christos Spyrou (born 1976), Greek weightlifter
- George Spyrou (1949–2010), Scottish businessman
- Loukas Spyrou (born 1973), Cypriot sprinter
- Panagiotis Spyrou (born 1947), Greek weightlifter
- Panagiotis Spyrou (weightlifter, born 2009), Greek male weightlifter
- Panayiotis Spyrou (born 1976) Cypriot footballer
- Spyros Spyrou (judoka) (born 1956), Cypriot judoka
- Spyros Spyrou (runner) (born 1958), Cypriot middle-distance runner

== See also ==
- Spyrou Kyprianou Avenue, an important avenue in Nicosia, Cyprus formerly known as Santa Rosa Avenue
