= Airship Industries =

British non-rigid airship manufacturer

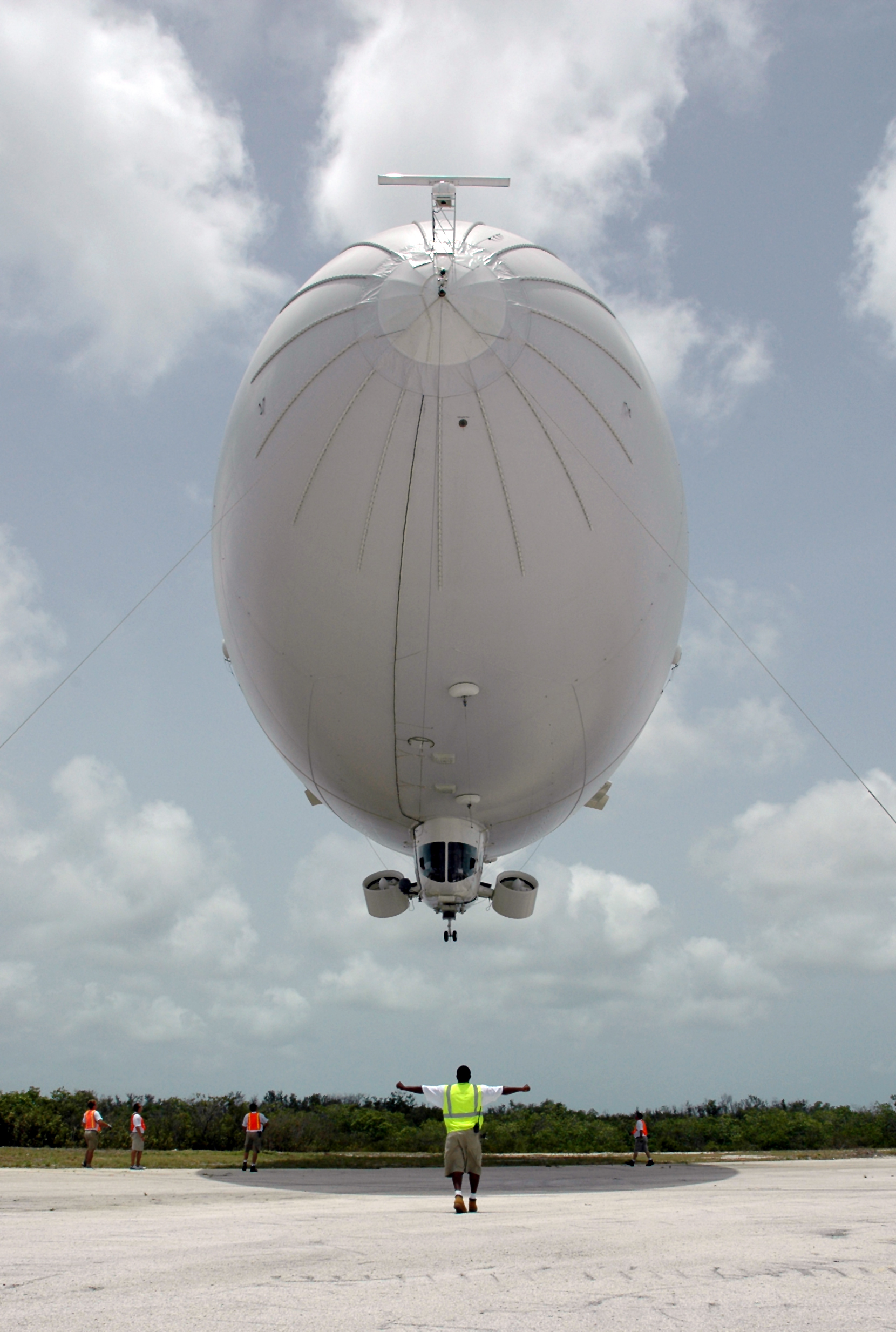
- Airship Industries blimp touching down
- Type: Public company
- Industry: Aircraft manufacture (airships)
- Predecessor: Airship Developments
- Founded: 1980
- Founder: Roger Munk, John Wood
- Defunct: 1990
- Successor: Hybrid Air Vehicles
- Headquarters: London, United Kingdom
- Area served: Worldwide
- Products: Skyship 500, Skyship 600

Airship Industries was a British manufacturers of modern non-rigid airships (blimps) active under that name from 1980 to 1990 and controlled for part of that time by Alan Bond. The first company, Aerospace Developments, was founded in 1970, and a successor, Hybrid Air Vehicles, remains active as of 2022. Airship Industries was active between 1980 and 1990.

In addition to the manufacture of non-rigid airships, several of the companies were involved in abortive proposals for many other non-rigid and rigid types. The historic airship facilities at Cardington, Bedfordshire (formerly the Royal Airship Works and RAF Cardington), were used as a base for the firm's test flying and an assembly site for some of its airships.

== Aerospace Developments, 1970–79 ==
=== Beginnings and the Shell International Gas project ===
Aerospace Developments (AD) was founded in 1970 by John Wood and Roger Munk (Jeffrey Roger Munk 1947–2010). Its first major project was the design of a very large – 549 m (1,801 ft) long with 2,750,000 m^{3} (97,000,000 ft^{3}) of gas capacity (Note: By comparison, the pre-war Zeppelin Hindenburg was 245 m (804 ft) long and had a capacity of 200,000 m^{3} (7,100,000 ft^{3})) – rigid airship for Shell International Gas.

The Shell project had been in progress since well before the formation of AD; Munk stated in 1975 that the idea had emerged "about seven years ago." Shell planned to use the airship to transport natural gas in gaseous form, eliminating the costly equipment associated with shipping liquefied natural gas by sea and, in particular, the need for large amounts of fixed plant in politically unstable countries. Barnes Wallis (Note: Wallis had worked on the British R100 design in the late-1920s) had been involved in the airship project in its early stages but withdrew due to problems with his design for a very large non-rigid.

The natural gas would have functioned as the primary lifting gas on the loaded voyage, with a small amount of helium, plus hot air from the airship's (gas-fuelled) engines, supporting it on the empty return leg. The ship's structure would have been "of a semi-monocoque type of stressed metal/skin honeycomb sandwich construction."

The project was "terminated before a detailed study of the concept could be crystallised." AD's work "showed that the concept was impracticable" but "[brought] Aerospace Developments into contact with the latest materials and ideas."

=== Smaller airships and the Aerovision contract ===
According to a paper delivered by Munk to a Royal Aeronautical Society symposium in 1975, dealing primarily with the Shell project, AD was at this time "pursuing the development potential" for "non-rigid, advanced technology airships in the half to ten ton payload range" for "general freight, surveying and airborne jeep" applications. These airships were to embody many of the innovative features eventually seen in the AD500 and Skyship 500/600, including vectored thrust and the use of modern materials such as Kevlar. Negotiations were stated to be in process with the governments of Peru, Ecuador and Nigeria concerning sales of such airships.

In May 1976 article, it was reported that Multi-Modal Transport Analysis (an associate firm to AD: the one covering marketing, the other technical matters – in total "a dozen people working full-time" on the project), had signed contracts with the Venezuelan company Aerovision for the construction and delivery in 1977 of an initial airship, with a further 21 ("of similar design to the first ship, but...vary in payload and therefore size") to be delivered over ten years. The first airships would be assembled and tested in Britain, with a gradual transference of production to Venezuela. A family of five airship types was proposed:

- Type A: 0.5 long tons (0.51 t) payload
- Type B: 1 long ton (1.0 t) payload
- Type C: 5 long tons (5.1 t) payload
- Type D: 10 long tons (10 t) payload
- Type E: 20 to 25 long tons (20 to 25 t) payload

The first airship (later to be designated the AD500) was to be of Type B. Night-time advertising flights would recoup the ship's cost, allowing it to be used by day in experiments supplying isolated communities in Venezuela's interior

=== The AD500 ===
The rollout of the first ship was delayed, mainly by certification problems (certification required the Civil Aviation Authority to write a set of airworthiness requirements for airships, something that took six months) but also by factors including a change of envelope supplier and revision of the engine and propeller design. The AD500, as it was by then known, first flew from Cardington on 3 February 1979.

The AD500 was "a new-generation airship making use of advanced materials and technology." It was 164 feet (50 m) long and contained 181,200 cubic feet (5,130 m^{3}) of helium. Materials used in the ship included thin single-ply polyester, coated with titanium dioxide-doped polyurethane, for the envelope; Kevlar for the cables suspending the gondola from the top of the envelope; a Kevlar nosecone moulded in the same manner as glass-reinforced plastic; and a gondola moulded by Vickers–Slingsby from Kevlar-reinforced plastic. Other innovations featured in the AD500 included simplified controls and thrust vectoring — an old airship idea revived — via inboard-mounted Porsche engines driving vectoring ducted fans.

Unfortunately, on 8 March 1979, the month-old AD500 was seriously damaged when the nosecone failed while the ship was moored in high winds. Aerovision subsequently withdrew its financial support, and AD was liquidated on 8 June.

== Airship Developments, 1979–80 ==
Following the loss of the AD500 prototype, the Aerospace Developments design team was reconstituted in September 1979 under the name Airship Developments Limited. During its short period under this name, the firm projected five non-rigid airship designs (several of which echoed the earlier AD proposals):

- AD15: a remotely piloted surveillance vehicle with a gas capacity of 150 cubic metres (5,300 ft^{3})
- AD100: a "runabout blimp" with 1,000 cubic metres (35,000 ft^{3}) of gas
- AD500: a rebuilt version of the prototype
- AD600: an enlarged AD500 with a gas capacity of 6,000 cubic metres (210,000 ft^{3}) (i.e. around 10% less than the eventual Skyship 600)
- AD5000: an extremely large (by non-rigid standards) craft with 50,000 cubic metres (1,800,000 ft^{3}) of gas and a payload of over 20 metric tons (20 long tons), foreshadowing the later Sentinel 5000/YEZ-2A programme

== Airship Industries, 1980–90 ==
=== Thermo-Skyships takeover ===
In May 1980, Airship Developments was acquired by Thermo-Skyships Ltd., a firm that had been working on lenticular airship designs (dubbed "flying saucers") that would have used heating of the lifting gas to control buoyancy. The resulting firm was known as Airship Industries Ltd.(AI). During the approximately two-and-a-half years the Thermo-Skyships team spent at AI, it proposed several abortive designs, for non-lenticular rigid airships.

=== Skyship 500 ===
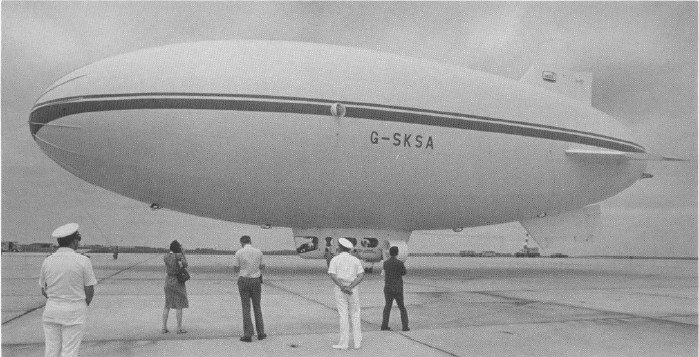
Skyship 500 G-SKSA

The AD500 was succeeded by the Skyship 500 model. The first flight of a Skyship 500 proper (i.e. excluding the AD500) took place from Cardington on 28 September 1981. The ship incorporated "many detail improvements" relative to the AD500, including a new envelope material, improved actuators, and an overall weight saving of around 140 kilograms (310 lb).

Five more 500s were subsequently built — one at Cardington, two in Toronto, one in Tokyo, and one in the United States. The ships were mainly used in advertising and filming. Other uses of the craft included sightseeing flights over London, a trial shuttle service between Paris's Orly and Charles de Gaulle airports and trials with NASA and the United States Air Force, United States Navy and United States Coast Guard. Four 500s were later upgraded to 500HL standards by mating the 500 gondola to a 600 envelope in order to increase lift for heavy payloads or hot and high applications. Two more 500 gondolas were begun but never completed.

=== Proposed rigid airships—R40/R130 and R150 ===
The former Thermo-Skyships design team proposed two rigid designs during their time with AI. In July 1980, AI announced "ambitious plans" to begin construction of a freight-carrying rigid, designated the Skyship R40, in early 1982. The airship (which appears also to have been referred to as the R130), was to be 183 metres (600 ft) long, contain 120,000 cubic metres (4,200,000 ft^{3}) of gas and have a hull form resembling that of the 1920s British rigid R100, with four Pratt & Whitney Canada PT6 turboprop engines. It would have been capable of carrying payloads of up to 58 tonnes (57 long tons). Redcoat Air Cargo proposed acquiring four R40s by 1984 and "opt[ing] out permanently from conventional aircraft."

A second design, the R150, followed. The R150 was to have been 174 metres (571 ft) long, with 152,000 cubic metres (5,400,000 ft^{3}) of gas and a payload of 75 tonnes (74 long tons), and propelled by four Garrett AiResearch turboprops, with an additional Allison turboshaft providing air to nose- and tail-mounted thrusters for purposes of low-speed control. The use of natural gas, or a combination of natural gas and LPG, as fuel was considered. Unlike the R40/R130, which was to have had a traditional rigid structure, the R150 was intended to be a metal-clad airship, with a thin metal shell stabilised by an internal pressure of around 2 kilopascals (0.29 psi).

FedEx was reportedly "negotiating the possible purchase" of a training airship" in early 1981, with the possibility of an order for R150 cargo airships to follow, and Redcoat—through which FedEx had approached AI— switched its order to the R150, ordering four airships with options on another ten. FedEx was motivated by fuel-efficiency concerns and considered airships suitable for lower-priority 48-hour package deliveries.

However, FedEx shelved its airship plans in late 1981 and Redcoat went into voluntary liquidation in mid-1982 due to cash flow problems. When AI's rigid division was subsequently split off, the R150 design was inherited by Wren Skyships and Wren went on to propose new metal-clads of varying sizes.

=== Demerger of Wren Skyships ===
In late 1982, Wren formed Wren Skyships as a "breakaway" of the rigid airship design division from Airship Industries. The former Thermo-Skyships was demerged from Airship Industries, becoming Wren Skyships (after founder Major Malcolm Wren) and relocating to Jurby airfield on the Isle of Man. The firm continued metal-clad development and began work on a non-rigid design, the Advanced Non-Rigid (ANR).

==== American Skyship Industries ====
American Skyship Industries, Inc. (ASI) was established as the U.S. manufacturing arm of Wren Skyships, ostensibly for the production of Metal-clad airships. ASI was founded by partners, Russell Scoville II, and Major Malcolm W. Wren RE. in 1981. No manufacturing facility, nor any airship, was ever built.

The City of Youngstown sold Lansdowne Airport to American Skyship Industries, Inc. for US$1 – the sale being contingent on construction of manufacturing facilities on the site. The airport was named after the noted American Navy rigid airship pioneer, Lt. Cmdr. Zachary Lansdowne. This sale of Lansdowne airport was met with some local opposition, concerns ranging from airship safety to a large hangar obstructing the view or being an eyesore.

By the summer of 1983, efforts to obtain federal and state funding had stalled. In June of that year, federal officials informed American Skyship Industries Inc. that additional proof of private financing was required before $4.2 million in federal loans and grants could be released. Internal disagreements and failure to raise the required private financing lead to Scoville's departure from the company he had co-founded. Afterward, the company was briefly managed by Michael McL. Foster-Turner. The company's offices were finally shuttered in the fall of 1984.

==== Advanced Airship Corporation (AAC) ====
Wren Skyships became the Advanced Airship Corporation (AAC) in 1988. Construction of the prototype ANR was commenced, but envelope problems delayed its completion, and AAC went into liquidation during the early 1990s recession.

=== Skyship 600 ===
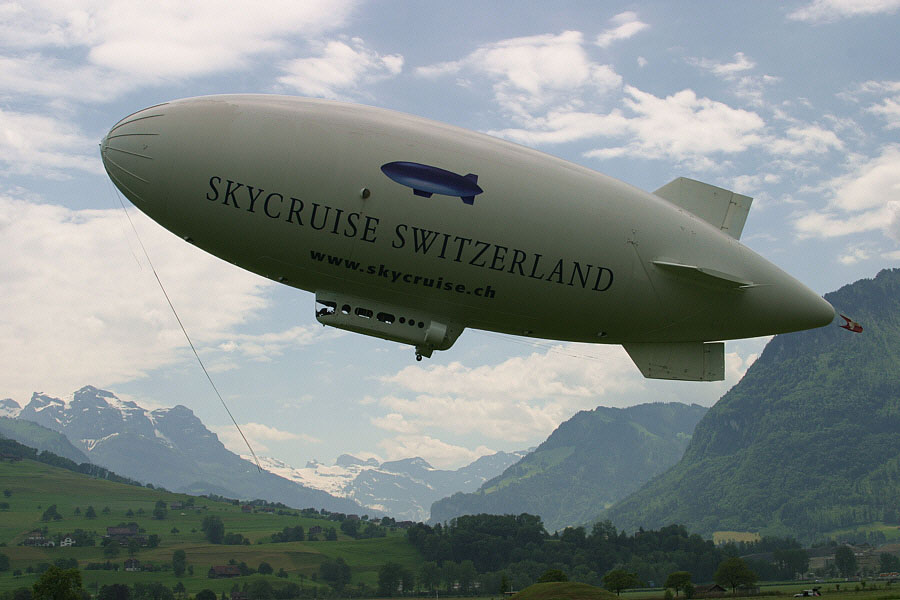
A Skyship 600 operated by Skycruise Switzerland

Airship Industries followed the Skyship 500 with the similar but larger Skyship 600, 59 metres (194 ft) long with 6,666 cubic metres (235,400 ft^{3}) of helium and seating for up to 18 passengers and two crew. The first Skyship 600 flew from Cardington on 6 March 1984. In all, ten Skyship 600s were built: two at Cardington; three at Weeksville, near Elizabeth City, North Carolina; one at Sydney; two in Japan; and one at Lakehurst, New Jersey. As was the case with the 500, two additional gondolas were commenced but never completed.

Like the 500, the 600 was employed in the traditional blimp role as an advertising and camera platform and tested in a variety of other civil and military roles. The sightseeing operations begun with the 500 were expanded to take in a number of additional cities worldwide, including Paris, Toronto, Montreal, Sydney, Brisbane, Melbourne, San Francisco and Zurich, as well as London.

=== Financial issues ===
At the time when the first 600 flew, AI was seeking to raise capital for continued operations. A£5.5 million rights issue in 1983 was followed by a second for £7 million, this time underwritten by Alan Bond's Bond Corporation, the following year. The firm had posted a £2.3 million loss for the six months to 30 September 1983, as a result of delays in the 500s testing and certification, difficulties in setting up a Canadian subsidiary and revenue lost due to the certification delays. It had lost almost £10 million between June 1978 and September 1983, and its share price fell from a 1983 high of 147p to 56p in March 1984. However, AI reported its first profit, some £50,000, in the 15 months to 30 June 1985.

=== The Sentinel 5000/YEZ-2A programme ===
In February 1985, the United States Navy (USN) issued a request for proposal for a radar-carrying Battle Surveillance Airship System (BSAS). AI responded with the Skyship 5000, "a concept airship of about 70,000 cubic metres (2,500,000 ft^{3})" The BSAS programme was subsequently renamed the Naval Airship Surveillance Program (NASP), then the Organic Long Endurance Airborne Area Surveillance Airship System, and finally became the Naval Airship Program. In mid-1985, the Naval Air Development Center awarded three six-month contracts for further studies to, respectively, Goodyear Aerospace, Boeing paired with Wren Skyships, and Westinghouse paired with AI. The Navy was reported to be "interested in up to 75 airships." On 5 June 1987, Westinghouse–Airship Industries (WAI) won the contract to build an Operational Development Model (ODM), or prototype, with the possibility of a production run of 40–50 airships if the ODM proved successful in trials. However, NASP was cut from the fiscal year 1989 defence budget. Congress later authorised funding to continue the ODM's development, and the Defense Advanced Research Projects Agency inherited the programme from the Navy.

In the design proposed in 1989, the Sentinel 5000, designated the YEZ-2A by the Navy, would have been 143 metres (469 ft) long and 32 metres (105 ft) in diameter, containing 70,864 cubic metres (2,502,500 ft^{3}) of helium. A crew of 10–15 would have been accommodated in a triple-decked, partly pressurised gondola, on top of which (within the envelope) the radar antenna was to be mounted. The ship would have been powered by two CRM diesel engines, with a supplementary General Electric T700 turboprop for "dash" situations. It would have offered an unrefuelled endurance of two to three days, which could be extended to 30 days through refuelling and replenishment from surface ships.

AI produced a smaller airship, the Sentinel 1000, as part of the development programme. The 1000 was a half-linear-scale model of the 5000, having a modified Skyship 600 gondola but a larger (10,000 cubic metres (350,000 ft^{3})) envelope and an empennage resembling the "X" form planned for the 5000, rather than the cruciform one of the 600. Other features included fly-by-light controls, an envelope material that eliminated the need for routine hangaring and a ground-handling technique that required a comparatively small crew of eight. However, the ship, which was assembled at WAI's Weeksville facility in North Carolina, did not fly until 26 June 1991, by which time AI had collapsed and Westinghouse had taken full control of the programme.

From an early stage of the programme, AI contemplated a civil version of the 5000, variously reported as accommodating between 140 and 300 passengers, for applications including both luxury shuttle services and conventional scheduled flights. However, this project was dependent on the success of the military programme.

=== The end of Airship Industries ===
AI made a loss of £15 million in the year to 30 June 1989, compared to £3.7 million in the preceding year and £5.1 million the year before that. In early 1990, after refinancing efforts failed, the firm sought to improve its financial position through a sale and leaseback of the Cardington facilities, an attempted sale of its US operations to Lou Pearlman's Airship International and efforts to renegotiate the YEZ-2A contract from fixed-price to cost plus. However, trading in the shares of AI's Isle of Man–based holding company was suspended in August 1990, and administrative receivers were appointed in September. About 7-% of its debts of £50 million were owed to Alan Bond.

Slingsby acquired the marketing and intellectual property rights to the civil versions of the 500, 500HL and 600—except in North America, where Airship International was the appointed agent—as well as work in progress, plant and fixed assets and UK, U.S., and Japanese type certificates. Westinghouse acquired the corresponding rights to military variants of the three designs and took full control of the YEZ-2A programme. Airship International acquired the share capital of AI's US operation, one complete and one incomplete 600, an incomplete 500HL and support equipment. The rights held by Airship International subsequently passed to Airship Management Services.

== Successor companies ==
=== Westinghouse Airships and the fate of the Sentinel programme ===
Westinghouse took full control of the Sentinel programme after the failure of Airship Industries, and the first flight of the Sentinel 1000 took place under Westinghouse's management in 1991. The type certificates for the 500HL and 600 designs, which had initially passed to Slingsby, were acquired by Westinghouse in 1993.

Aside from the Sentinel 1000's role as a demonstrator for the 5000, Westinghouse promoted the 1000 itself for roles such as demonstrating over-the-horizon targeting and acting as a sensor platform for drug interdiction. The UK's Ministry of Defence reportedly sent pilots to the US in early 1992 to evaluate the airship. In late 1993, the Sentinel 1000 became the first aircraft with fly-by-light controls to receive FAA certification and possibly the first such aircraft to be certificated anywhere.

In 1993, Westinghouse was "still hopeful" that a prototype YEZ-2A would fly in 1998. The roles envisaged at this stage were "radar surveillance in support of U.S. Navy fleet operations and theatre missile-defence for the U.S. Army." The prototype would have been constructed at Moffett Field, California.

On 2 August 1995, a fire, apparently started accidentally during welding work, destroyed the Weeksville hangar and its contents, including the sole Sentinel 1000 and the mock-up of the 5000's gondola. Despite the setback, work on the 5000 project continued, and the firm projected an airship somewhat larger than the 1000, the Sentinel 1240, which would have been capable of accommodating 40 passengers. Changes to the 5000's design were also proposed, including a simpler, single-deck, gondola and the replacement of the two gondola-mounted diesel engines and one turboprop with three Zoche diesels, two mounted on a beam spanning across the envelope and one at the tail. Both Moffett Field and Lakehurst were under consideration as construction locations. However, further plans were stymied by the sale of Westinghouse's defence-electronics business to Northrop Grumman in early 1996. Westinghouse Airships did not form part of this deal; its designs, patents, and other assets were subsequently acquired by British investor group London Wall, in a deal led by Roger Munk.

=== Airship Technologies and its successors ===
Airship Technologies

The successor company became known as Airship Technologies.

Advanced Technologies Group (ATG)

Airship Technologies folded, to be succeeded by Advanced Technologies Group (ATG). Although ATG received two orders for the Skyship 600B, a higher-performance version of the 600, in its early years, it sold the type certificate for the 600 to Julian Benscher of Global Skyship and concentrated instead on a new product line. The firm constructed a solitary example of its AT-10 airship, a small non-rigid 40.3 metres (132 ft) long with a gas volume of 2,306 cubic metres (81,400 ft^{3}), i.e. somewhat less than half the Skyship 500's volume. It also projected unrealised non-rigids, such as the 50-seat AT-04, and undertook development work on a hybrid airship, the SkyCat.

The SkyKitten, a 1/6 linear scale model of a SkyCat design, was built and flown by ATG in the United Kingdom at Cardington.

SkyCat group

After ATG went into administration, its assets were acquired in 2006 by an Italian–British consortium and the new business named SkyCat Group. However, SkyCat Group itself went into administration about a year later.

=== Hybrid Air Vehicles ===
The assets of the SkyCat group were acquired by a new firm, Hybrid Air Vehicles (HAV), set up by British investors in 2007. HAV and partner Northrop Grumman won a $517 million LEMV contract to build three Hybrid Air Vehicles HAV 304 hybrid airships for the US Army in Afghanistan. The first one flew in 2012 but the project was terminated the next year in a round of US defence cuts. HAV re-purchased the envelope of the HAV 304 and returned it to the UK, where they refurbished it for civilian use as the Airlander 10. Airlander 10 completed design certification testing before being written off when it came loose from its moorings in a high wind on 18 November 2017 at Cardington Airfield.

== Notes ==
Notes

Citations
