= Airship Industries Skyship 500 =

British non-rigid airship

Skyship 500
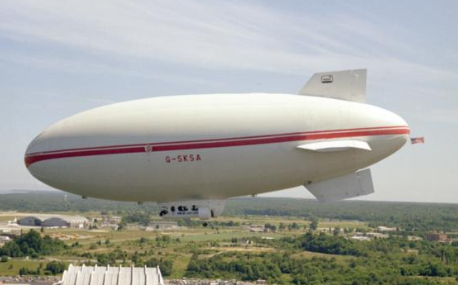
- A 1983 Photo of the Skyship 500 at the Naval Air Development Center (NADC)

General information
- Type: Airship
- National origin: United Kingdom
- Manufacturer: Airship Industries
- Number built: 6 (including 1x AD500)

History
- Manufactured: 1980–1990
- First flight: 28 September 1981

The Skyship 500 is a non-rigid airship designed and built in the United Kingdom during the 1980s. It is notable for a playing a role in the James Bond film A View to a Kill.

== Design and development ==
The Skyship 500 was developed from the Aerospace Developments AD500, the sole example of which was effectively the prototype / technology demonstrator for the production Skyship 500.

=== AD500 ===
Aerospace Developments began the design of a new non-rigid airship in the 1970s, intended to carry out civil and paramilitary roles, such as aerial advertising, promotional and pleasure flying, surveillance and maritime patrol duties.

The AD500 introduced new materials and technology to airship manufacture and operations. Materials used in the ship included thin single-ply polyester, coated with titanium dioxide-doped polyurethane, for the envelope;Kevlar for the cables suspending the gondola from the top of the envelope; a Kevlar nose-cone moulded in the same manner as glass-reinforced plastic; and a gondola moulded by Vickers–Slingsby from Kevlar-reinforced plastic. Other innovations featured in the AD500 included simplified controls and thrust vectoring ducted fans driven by inboard-mounted Porsche engines.

Assembly of the prototype AD500 began at No.1 Hangar Cardington in March 1978 but it was not flown until 3 February 1979, due to various problems with certification and the power-plant. On 8 March 1979, whilst moored outside the hangar, a storm blew up unexpectedly, preventing the airship from being moved into the hangar. The nose cone was damaged and the envelope was deflated using the emergency rip cord.

Although regarded as a success, Aerovision, the major investor in Aerospace Developments, pulled the plug and the company went into liquidation on 8 June 1979. Development of the AD500 continued with a new company, Airship Developments, until it was acquired by Thermo-Skyships Ltd to form Airship Industries to bring the concept to production as the Skyship 500.

=== Skyship 500 ===
With the formation of Airship Industries production of the Skyship 500 could commence and five further airships were produced.-

The Skyship 500 consists of a polyester fabric envelope, retaining helium gas, and carrying a gondola for the control cabin, passenger cabin, propulsion systems and ballast (fixed and jettison-able). The envelope is of a traditional streamlined shape with cruciform tail surfaces which carry rudder and elevator control surfaces for yaw and pitch. The undercarriage consists of a castoring twin-wheeled oleo-pneumatic strut at the rear of the gondola, with ground handling ropes for ground crew to manoeuvre the airship on the ground. The nose-cone of the envelope also carries the mooring point which can connect to a mobile mooring mast.

The polyester fabric envelope is coated on the outside with Titanium Dioxide (TiO_{2}) loaded Polyurethane to reduce Ultra-Violet degradation and lined with a Polyvinylidene chloride (PVDC) film bonded to the fabric to minimise Helium (He) losses.

Most other structural components are produced from fibre-reinforced composite materials, to reduce weight, including Fibre-lam board used to build up the fibre reinforced plastic (FRP) tail surfaces and control surfaces.

The moulded FRP gondola houses the control cabin, passenger cabin, power-plant systems and ballast (both fixed and jettison-able). Large windows to the front and sides provide excellent visibility for crew and passengers seated on five individual seats and a three abreast bench seat at the rear. Support for the gondola comes from Kevlar cables inside the envelope.

Power for the Skyship 500 comes from two converted Porsche 930/10 engines inside the rear of the gondola driving the vectoring Hoffmann ducted reversible-pitch propellers through lateral drive-shafts and converted Westland Lynx tail-rotor gearboxes. The pilot and co-pilot seated at the front of the cabin have a full set of instruments and avionics and control the airship through yokes which operate the control surfaces though cables.

One of the five production airships was modified into a heavy payload version, designated Skyship 500 (HL), using a larger Skyship 600 envelope but carrying a Skyship 500 gondola.

== Operational history ==
In the years 1980-1990 the 6 Skyship 500 airships were used worldwide, not only for advertising but also for security and passenger sky-cruises over major cities. Fujifilm arranged the first overseas charter, using JA-1003, which was delivered in March 1984.

A Skyship 500 was used as a camera and surveillance platform at the Games of the XXIII Olympiad in 1984 at Los Angeles, California. Later in 1984 the aircraft was shown to full effect in the James Bond film A View to a Kill.

Skyship 500s also carried out Sky-cruises and were used as advertising billboards using light arrays. The 1987 Sky-cruise programme offered a schedule of 700 flights in a season (from March to October). Demand for the programme was so high that all flights were sold out within 72 hours.

At least one Skyship 500 was trialed by the United States Navy, at the Naval Air Development Center (NADC), NAS Patuxent River, Maryland.

== Variants ==
AD 500
A single prototype airship produced by Aerospace Developments, first flown in 1979 but damaged and deflated in a storm later that year.
Skyship 500
Five production airships built by Airship Industries. One was subsequently converted into the:
Skyship 500 (HL)
A single high payload airship, using a Skyship 600 envelope with a Skyship 500 gondola.

== Related type ==
Skyship 600
A larger higher performance airship derived from the Skyship 500.

== Specifications (Skyship 500) ==
Data from Jane's All the World's Aircraft 1988-89

General characteristics

- Crew: 2
- Capacity: 8 passengers
- Length: 52 m (170 ft 7 in)
- Diameter: 14 m (45 ft 11 in)
- Height: 18.66 m (61 ft 3 in)
- Volume: 5,153 m^{3} (182,000 cu ft) gross
- Ballonet volume: 1,334 m^{3} (47,109.8 cu ft) (Nominal 26% of gross volume)
- Max gross gas lift: 4,500 kg (9,900 lb)
- Max disposable load: 1,260 kg (2,780 lb)
- Emergency ballast: 513 kg (1,131 lb) of water in tanks in the gondola
- Fuel capacity: 545 L (144.0 US gal; 119.9 imp gal)
- Gondola length: 9.24 m (30 ft 3.8 in)
- Gondola width: 2.41 m (7 ft 10.9 in)
- Cabin length: 4.2 m (13 ft 9.4 in)
- Cabin height: 1.96 m (6 ft 5.2 in)
- Powerplant: 2 × Porsche 930/01/AI/3 cylinder horizontally-opposed, normally aspirated piston engines, 152 kW (204 hp) each
- Propellers: 5-bladed Hoffmann HO-V 155 A-R reversible pitch propeller in a vectorable duct (90° up, 120° down), 1.372 m (4 ft 6 in) diameter

Performance

- Maximum speed: 93 km/h (58 mph, 50 kn) @5000rpm
- Cruise speed: 56 km/h (35 mph, 30 kn) @3000rpm
- Range: 870 km (540 mi, 470 nmi) at 74 km/h (46 mph; 40 kn)
- Endurance: 12 hours
- Service ceiling: 2,980 m (9,770 ft) (max theoretical pressure height in ISA)

Avionics

- King Silver Crown dual nav/com, ADF, Omega, VOR/ILS and weather radar
