= Airship Management Services =

The Palm airship over the Coliseum

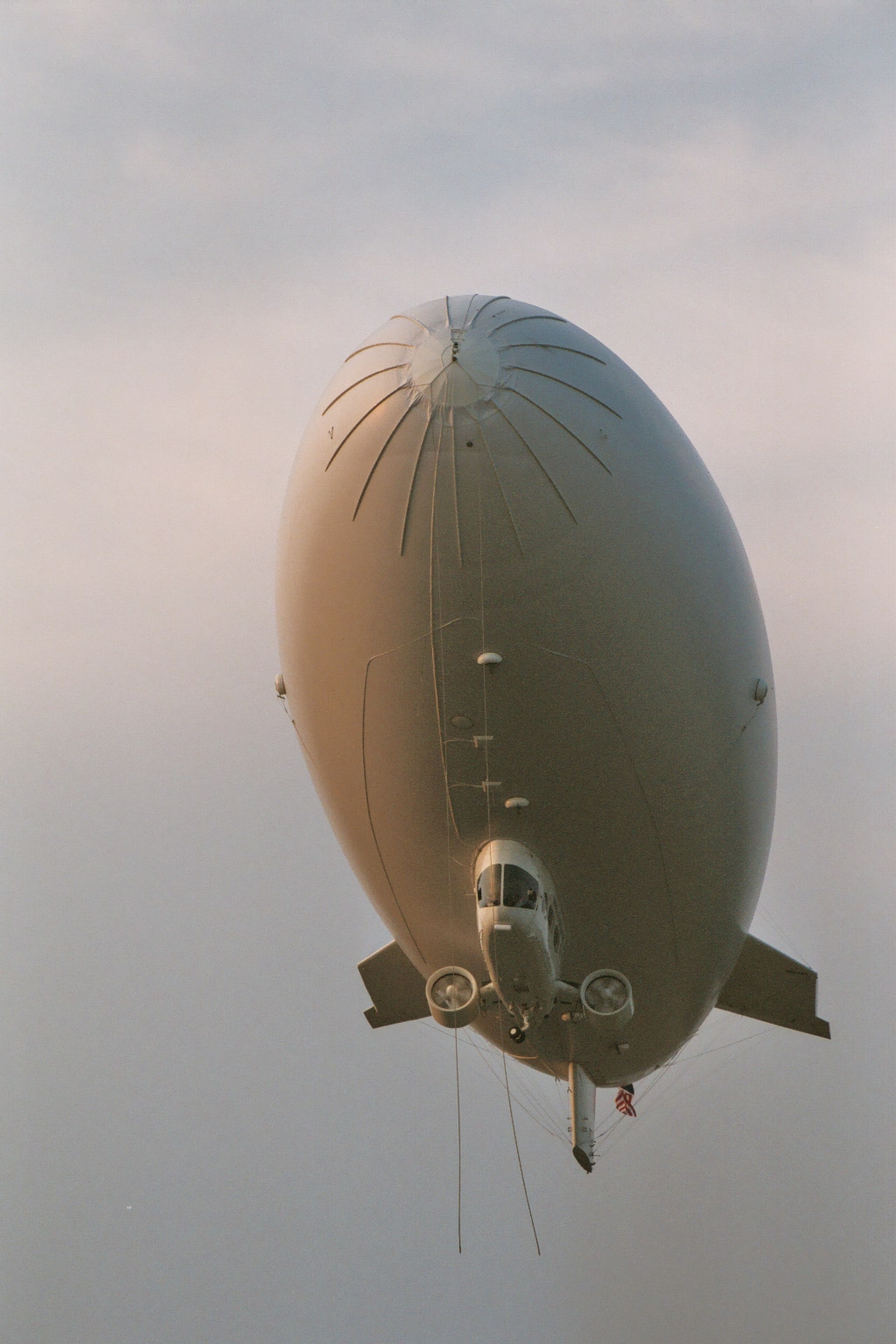
Unbranded Skyship

Airship Management Services, Inc. (AMS) built, owned and operated Airship Industries Skyship and Sentinel type airships. The company was run by George Spyrou, and through associated companies in the U.S., Europe and Japan. AMS was part of the Skycruiser Group of companies, which includes Skycruiser Corporation and Global Skyship Industries (formerly- Westinghouse Airship Industries).

== Background ==
AMS was a private company founded in 1990, based in Greenwich, Connecticut, with a maintenance facility and FAA Repair Station in Elizabeth City, North Carolina.

Clients in the United States have included Ameriquest, the New York City Police Department and Fujifilm (USA) Inc., which used a Skyship 600 type airship in the US since 1984, starting with the Los Angeles Summer Olympics. A Sky-ship was also used over the Olympic Games in Seoul, Korea in 1988 and the Atlanta Olympics in 1996. In addition, AMS provided two Sky-ships for use over the Athens Olympics in 2004, one for use by Science Applications International Corporation (SAIC) and the Hellenic Police in Greece, and the other for broadcasting by NBC TV.

Since 1980, fifteen Sky-ships were designed, built, and operated around the world for such customers as Japan Airlines, the Korean Sports Foundation, Fuji film, the Tokyo Police, Citibank, the French Ministry of the Interior, and Pepsi-Cola. In addition, “Sky-cruises” (passenger tours) operated over London, Paris, Munich, Sydney, Melbourne, Switzerland and San Francisco.

A Sky-ship was used for a tour across Europe during 2006, from London to Paris to Rome to Athens, promoting The Palm Islands project in Dubai, United Arab Emirates

== Roles ==
Airships have been used as advertising and promotional vehicles and for the carriage of passengers, but also as television camera platforms, broadcast relay stations and as surveillance vehicles from which various sensors can be operated. AMS developed these applications with numerous clients, including Westinghouse, Northrop Grumman, the U.S. Navy, Defense Advanced Research Projects Agency (DARPA), the U.S. Army, the British Ministry of Defence, the NYPD's Counterterrorism Division (for security surveillance), and Woods Hole Oceanographic Institution (WHOI) for environmental surveys.

During the 2008 GOP Presidential Primary, AMS operated the Ron Paul Blimp.

One Sky-ship, Santos-Dumont (named for Alberto Santos-Dumont), was used to operate in the Caribbean for the Special Anti-Crime Unit of Trinidad & Tobago (SAUTT) providing security surveillance. During April 2009, this ship provided aerial surveillance over the 5th Summit of the Americas in Port-of-Spain.
