= Francesco Lana de Terzi =

Italian physicist and mathematician (1631–1687)

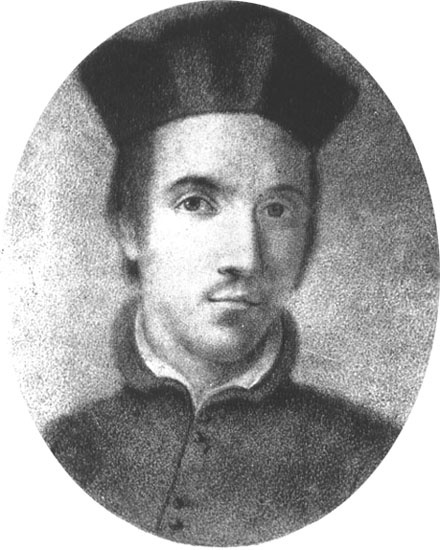
- Engraved portrait of Francesco Lana de Terzi by an unknown artist
- Born: 1631; Brescia, Lombardy
- Died: 22 February 1687 (aged 55–56); Brescia, Lombardy
- Education: Roman College
- Known for: creating the first scientifically grounded design for a lighter-than-air craft
- Scientific career
- Fields: Jesuit priest, mathematician and natural philosopher
- Workplaces: University of Ferrara
- Academic advisors: Paolo Casati

Signature
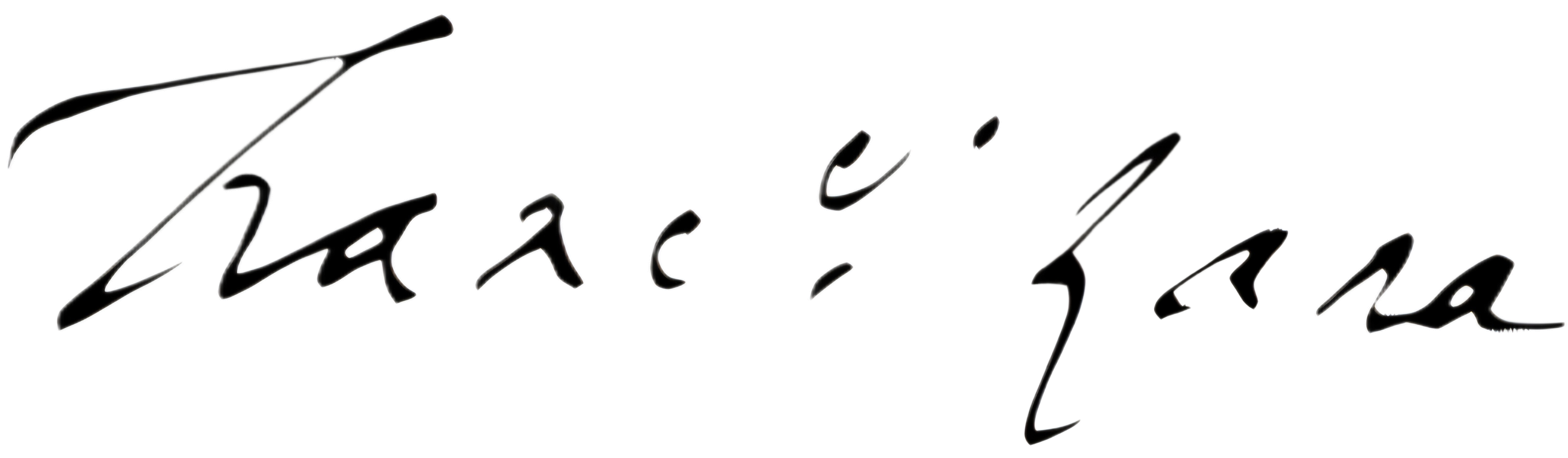

Francesco Lana de Terzi (1631 in Brescia, Lombardy – 22 February 1687, in Brescia, Lombardy) was an Italian Jesuit priest, mathematician, naturalist and aeronautics pioneer. Having been professor of physics and mathematics at Brescia, he first sketched the concept for a vacuum airship and has been referred to as the Father of Aeronautics for his pioneering efforts, turning the aeronautics field into a science by establishing "a theory of aerial navigation verified by mathematical accuracy". He also developed the idea that developed into Braille. The asteroid 6892 Lana was named after him.

== Biography ==
Francesco Lana de Terzi was born in Brescia into a noble family on 10 December 1631. After studying at the Collegio dei Nobili di Sant'Antonio, he joined the Society of Jesus on 11 November 1647.

After completing his novitiate, he moved to the Roman College, where he studied literature for two years and philosophy for three years (1651–1654). In 1652, he began collaborating with the German polymath Athanasius Kircher, who introduced him to the experimental method. He also attended Paolo Casati's mathematics courses.

From 1675 to 1679, Lana taught mathematics and physics at the University of Ferrara. In Ferrara, he befriended his fellow Jesuit Daniello Bartoli and studied the work of Galileo, Kepler, Hevelius, Huygens and Malpighi.

Due to his poor health, he returned to Brescia, where he became a philosophy teacher at the convent of Santa Maria delle Grazie. In 1671, he was appointed a corresponding member of the Royal Society of London and began corresponding with the young Leibniz.

In 1686, he founded the Accademia dei Filelfici in Brescia, modelled on the Accademia dei Lincei. The Academy's aim was to publish the results of its members' experiments, as well as review new Italian and foreign publications. However, the academy did not survive the death of its founder, only publishing one volume of proceedings.

== Airship design ==
Francesco Lana de Terzi's design for a flying boat, 1670

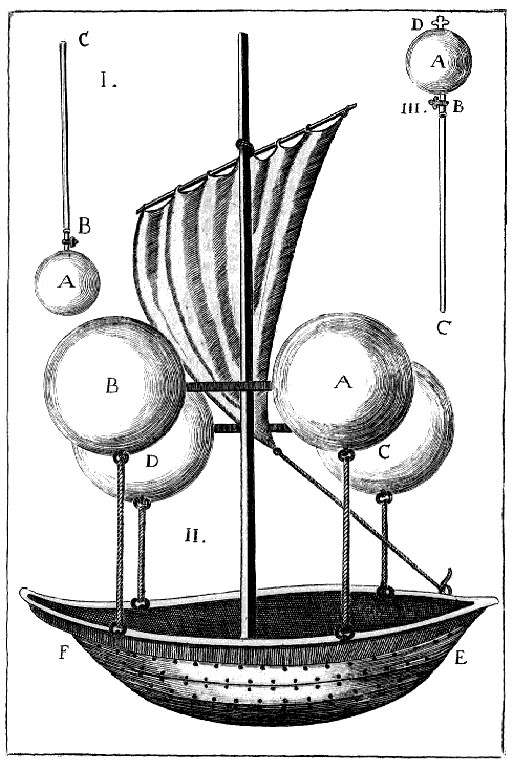
Francesco Lana de Terzi's flying boat concept c.1670

In the year 1670, Francesco Lana de Terzi published a book titled Prodromo, including a chapter titled saggio di alcune invenzioni nuove premesso all'arte maestra ("Essay on new inventions premised on the master art"), which contained the description of a “flying ship”. Encouraged by the experiments of Otto von Guericke with the Magdeburg hemispheres, in 1663 Lana de Terzi developed an idea for a lighter than air vessel.

His design had a central mast to which a sail was attached, and four masts which had thin copper foil spheres attached to them: the air would be pumped out of the spheres, leaving a vacuum inside, and so being lighter than the surrounding air, would provide lift. The airship would be steered like a sailing boat. Each sphere would have had a diameter of 7.5 m (24 ft 7 in). Terzi calculated that the weight of a sphere would be 180 kg (396 lb). He also calculated that the air in the sphere would weigh 290 kg (638 lb), and would provide enough lift to carry 6 passengers. At the time no one could manufacture such thin copper foil and the pressure of the surrounding air would have collapsed the spheres. In addition, Francesco Lana de Terzi was aware that one could use such a vehicle as a weapon of war, and attack cities from the air. He wrote: “God will never allow that such a machine be built…because everybody realises that no city would be safe from raids…iron weights, fireballs and bombs could be hurled from a great height".

The fact that these vacuum spheres were physically impossible was proven in 1710 by Gottfried William Leibniz, and such a vessel has never been built. Although Leibniz's conclusion was made based on the materials known at the time, the discovery of graphene and recent advances in its production may render this conclusion obsolete. A model of Lana de Terzi's invention is on display at the Smithsonian National Air and Space Museum in Washington, D.C.

Lana de Terzi's idea was discussed in Leibniz's Hypothesis physica nova (1671). In 1671, a review by Henry Oldenburg of the Prodromus appeared in the Philosophical Transactions. Robert Hooke, the Curator of the Royal Society, presented an English translation of certain sections of the Prodromo, together with a long discussion of the theories involved.

== Blind writing alphabet ==
In his book Prodromo, he introduced an entirely new alphabet for blind people of his own invention. Unlike previous blind writing systems, Lana's alphabet was based on the idea that it did not have to mimic the regular handwritten or printed letters, but had to be based on signs (dashes) that could be recognized by the touch of one's fingers. The one detail which prevented the success of this invention is that Lana failed to understand that dots were more easily recognizable than dashes by the touch. Louis Braille made this fundamental intuition and devised the blind writing alphabet that was named after him.

Prodomo also contains a music cipher in which letters of the alphabet are translated into musical notes. Although primarily intended for sending secret messages hidden via sheet music, the resulting melody could be transmitted by ear, and thus would also be accessible to the blind.

== Works ==
- Lana de Terzi, Francesco (1672). "Reflections Made by P. Francisco Lana S. F. upon an Observation of Signor M. Antonio Castagna, Super Intendent of Some Mines in Italy, Concerning the Formation of Crystals: English'd Out of the XI. Venetian Giornale de Letterati". Philosophical Transactions. 7 (83): 4068–4069. Bibcode:1672RSPT....7.4068F. doi:10.1098/rstl.1672.0024. JSTOR 100935.
- Francesco Lana de Terzi (1670). Prodromo ovvero saggio di alcune inventione nuove premesso all'arte Maestra Opera che prepara il P. Francesco Lana, Bresciano della Compagnia di Giesu. Per mostrare li più reconditi proncipij della Naturale Filosofia, riconosciuti con accurata Teorica nelle più segnalate inventioni, ed isperienze fin'hora ritrovate da gli scrittori di questa materia & altre nuove dell'autore medesimo. Brescia: Rizzardi. (Ristampa: Milano, Longanesi, 1977)
- Francesco Lana de Terzi (1684). Magisterium naturae, et artis. Opus physico-mathematicum (in Latin). Vol. 1. Brescia: per Io. Mariam Ricciardum.
- Francesco Lana de Terzi (1686). Magisterium naturae, et artis. Opus physico-mathematicum (in Latin). Vol. 2. Brescia: per Io. Mariam Ricciardum.
- Francesco Lana de Terzi (1692). Magisterium naturae, et artis. Opus physico-mathematicum (in Latin). Vol. 3. Parma: Typis Hyppoliti Rosati ac sumptibus Iosephi ab Oleo.

== See also ==
- List of Roman Catholic scientist-clerics
