= Airship Industries Skyship 600 =

British non-rigid airship

Skyship 600
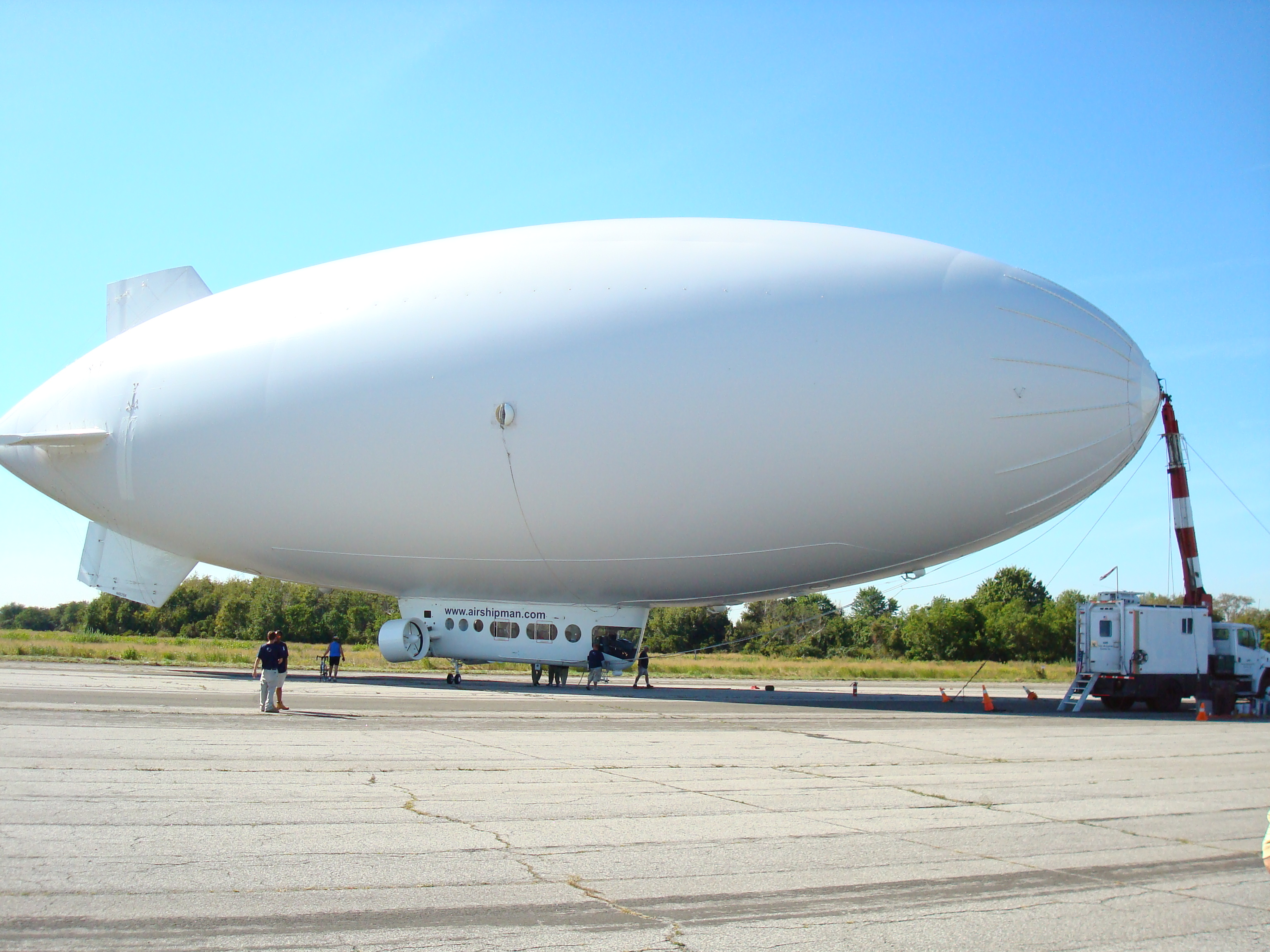
- A Skyship 600 on the mast at Floyd Bennett Field in Brooklyn, New York

General information
- Type: commercial non-rigid airship
- Manufacturer: Airship Industries
- Number built: 10

History
- First flight: 6 March 1984
- Developed from: Airship Industries Skyship 500

The Airship Industries Skyship 600 is a modern blimp, originally designed by British company Airship Industries, further developed by a subsidiary of Westinghouse Electric Corporation. The type certificate holder is now Skyship Services of Orlando, Florida, US.

The first Skyship 600 made its maiden flight on 6 March 1984. By August 1987 a further six had been built and flown. The Skyship 600 is similar in appearance to, but larger than, the Skyship 500.

Airship Industries collapsed in 1990. Westinghouse Electric's defense arm had taken over the US Navy's airship programme in which Airship Industries was a partner and bought the military marketing rights and intellectual rights to the Skyship designs from the official receiver. Slingsby Aviation, which was the principal subcontractor to Airship Industries bought other assets, marketing rights and intellectual property for civil versions along with the type certificates. Westinghouse purchased the Skyship 600S demonstrator, Airship International – who were to market the civil design in the Americas – bought two unfinished Skyships and Skyship 600-02, and took over the equipment of Airship Industries US arm.

The type certificates for the Skyship 600 series was purchased from Westinghouse Airships in 1994 by American company Global Skyship Industries, transferred to Skycruiser Corporation in 2004 and changed hands again in 2012 to Skyship Services.

== Use ==
Most Skyship 600s have been used for advertising purposes, like 600-05 which flew in 2006-7 as "Spirit of Dubai". A purpose built Skyship was used to promote the Division Bell tour by Pink Floyd in 1994 until the ship's destruction. Pieces of the craft used by Pink Floyd became souvenirs. In December 2007, a Skyship 600 was leased by supporters of US presidential candidate Ron Paul to fly with the banner "Who is Ron Paul? Google Ron Paul". Others have been used for surveillance purposes, including during the 2004 Summer Olympics.

The first Skyship, No 600-01 registered G-SKSC, was used for trials with the French Navy. The 2.2 tonne-payload fifth built (600-05) was sold to a Canadian mining company for aerial survey work.

== Design ==
The envelope is fabricated from polyester cloth, coated inside with saran film for gas retention and outside with polyurethane loaded with titanium dioxide for durability. The gondola is a kevlar-reinforced moulding, suspended from the top of the envelope by kevlar cables. The pilot controls elevators and rudders on the tail surfaces by fore-aft and lateral movement of a yoke, via a manual, cable-operated system. In response to Airship Industries intent to enter the military market, Marconi did start on a system using fibre optics to carry the control signals to electrical actuators. This could reduce pilot workload, make control response more precise but be resistant to electrical interference.

Skyships are equipped with a pair of ballonets, one forward and one aft comprising a maximum of 27% of the envelope's gross volume. Ballonets are air-filled compartments within an airship that compensate for the expansion and contraction of the helium, thereby maintaining envelope pressure. They can be filled, or partially filled, with air. Emptying of air is done through four valves under the envelope. The valves open automatically as the ship climbs; air is released, the ballonets collapse and the helium expands. During descent, air from the propeller ducts, and/or electric fans is used to inflate the ballonets, and keep the envelope from collapsing. The ballonets can be independently filled by using shut-off dampers in the air supply trunking. Through differential inflation a measure of pitch trim can be obtained.

Earlier models were propelled by two Porsche 930 turbocharged piston engines, but some have been modified with Textron Lycoming IO-540 engines. One important feature of this series is thrust-vector control. The ducted propellers can be swivelled in the vertical plane upwards and downwards, providing vertical thrust for use in takeoff, landing and hovering.

=== Spirit of Dubai – The Palm ===
Spirit of Dubai – The Palm was one of three Skyship 600 aircraft operated by Airship Management Services of Greenwich, USA. These ships are now the world's largest currently operating non-rigid airships. (Note: the Zeppelin NT is a larger airship, but is a semi-rigid design.) The airship, N605SK (s/n 1215-05) was built by Airship Industries in Cardington, UK and first flew as G-SKSJ in November 1986. It is currently owned and operated by Skycruise Switzerland AG. Airship Industries went into administration in 1990 and it was divided up between Slingsby and (for military uses) Westinghouse Corporation.

In November 2006, the ship was leased and decorated with new artwork and flown under the name Spirit of Dubai. It was planned to make a publicity tour from London to Dubai, United Arab Emirates. The journey was being undertaken to promote a new land development, The Palm Jumeirah in Dubai. The journey was planned to take in landmarks including Big Ben, the London Eye and Tower Bridge in London, Stonehenge and the White Cliffs of Dover in England, the Eiffel Tower and Palace of Versailles in Paris, the Leaning Tower of Pisa in Pisa and the Colosseum in Rome, the Parthenon in Athens, and the Great Pyramids in Egypt.

The airship made it to Crete. The next leg of the journey was planned to go through Egypt. However, for reasons unexplained, the Egyptian authorities refused to grant permission for the airship to make the trip. In the spring of 2007 the ship returned to Europe for use in sightseeing. Prior to its departure from London, the aircraft was used for sightseeing tours in Switzerland under its owner/operator company name Skycruise Switzerland.

== Successor ==
Ten Skyship 600s have been built and a successor, the Skyship 600B, has been planned. Although ATG received two orders for the Skyship 600B, a higher-performance version of the 600, in its early years, it sold the type certificate for the 600 to Julian Benscher of Global Skyship.

== Gallery ==
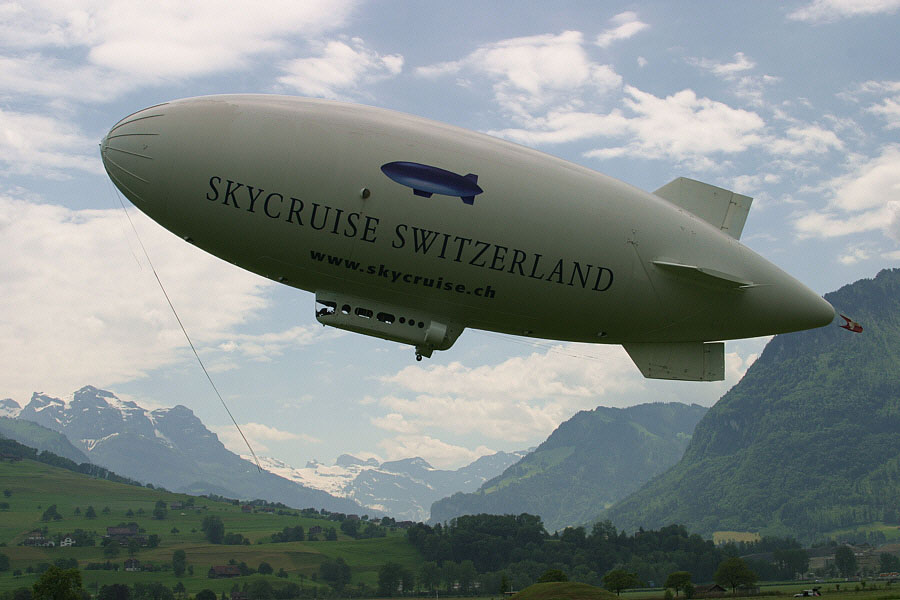
A skyship 600 in Skycruise Switzerland in the Swiss Alps

The ballonet system inside the airship envelope

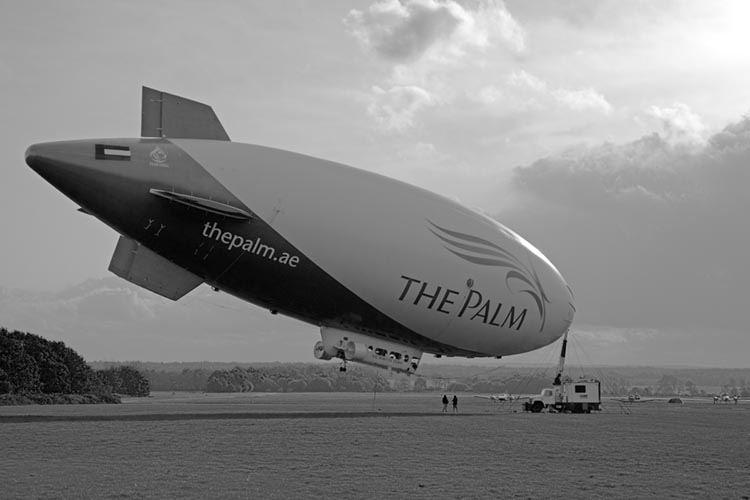
Spirit of Dubai – The Palm, on the UK leg of her 2006 tour. Note the scale of the airship from the two technicians standing below her.

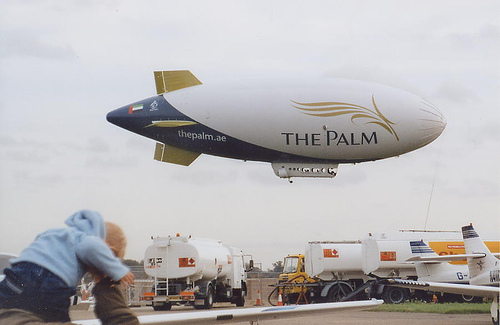
The Skyship over Fair Oaks airport prior to her 2006 tour.

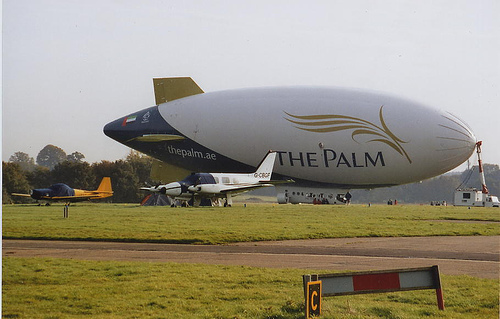
Spirit of Dubai near at Fair Oaks airport in the UK prior to departure

== Specifications (Skyship 600) ==
Data from Jane's All the World's Aircraft 1988-89

General characteristics

- Crew: 2
- Capacity: 12 passengers
- Length: 59 m (193 ft 7 in)
- Diameter: 15.2 m (49 ft 10 in)
- Height: 20.3 m (66 ft 7 in)
- Volume: 6,666 m^{3} (235,400 cu ft) gross
- Ballonet volume: 1,800 m^{3} (63,566.4 cu ft) (Nominal 26% of gross volume)
- Max gross gas lift: 6,100 kg (13,400 lb)
- Max disposable load: 2,343 kg (5,165 lb)
- Fuel capacity: 682 L (180.2 US gal; 150.0 imp gal) + optional auxiliary tanks
- Gondola length: 11.67 m (38 ft 3.4 in)
- Gondola width: 2.56 m (8 ft 4.8 in) max
- Cabin length: 6.89 m (22 ft 7.3 in)
- Cabin height: 1.92 m (6 ft 3.6 in)
- Powerplant: 2 × Porsche 930/67/AI/3 6-cylinder horizontally-opposed, turbo-charged piston engines, 190 kW (255 hp) each
- Propellers: five-bladed Hoffmann HO-V 155 A-R/137, 1.372 m (4 ft 6 in) diameter in vectoring ducts (+90 / -120 degrees)

Performance

- Maximum speed: 92.59 km/h (57.53 mph, 49.99 kn) @5,000 rpm
- Cruise speed: 55.56 km/h (34.52 mph, 30.00 kn) @3,000 rpm
- Range: 1,020 km (630 mi, 550 nmi) at 74 km/h (46 mph; 40 kn) without auxiliary tanks
- Service ceiling: 3,050 m (10,010 ft) (max theoretical pressure height in ISA)
