= Vacuum airship =

Hypothetical airship that is evacuated rather than filled with a lighter-than-air gas

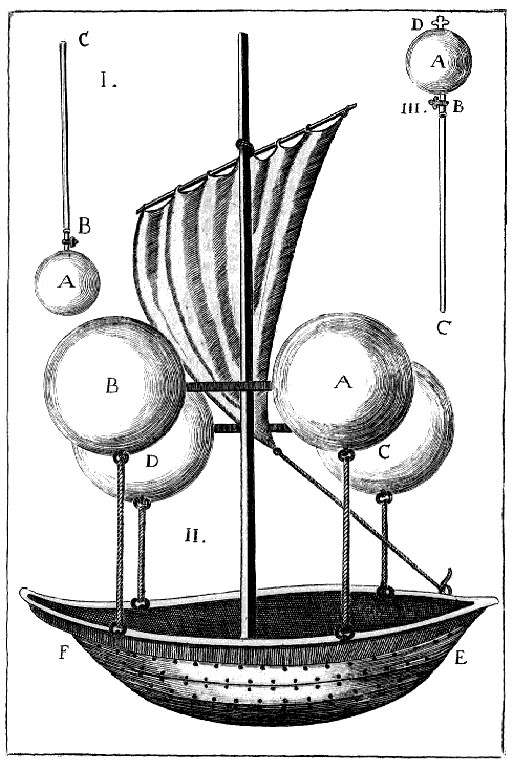
Francesco Lana de Terzi's flying boat concept c.1670

A vacuum airship, also known as a vacuum balloon, is a hypothetical airship that is evacuated rather than filled with a lighter-than-air gas such as hydrogen or helium. This would be the ultimate expression of lifting power per volume displaced. The pressure difference across the wall of the balloon presents major engineering problems, and this has resulted in no practical applications.

== History ==
First proposed by Italian Jesuit priest Francesco Lana de Terzi in 1670, the vacuum balloon (Also called "FLanar", combination of F. Lana and the Portuguese word "flanar," which means wandering.)

From 1886 to 1900 Arthur De Bausset attempted in vain to raise funds to construct his "vacuum-tube" airship design, but despite early support in the United States Congress, the general public was skeptical. Illinois historian Howard Scamehorn reported that Octave Chanute and Albert Francis Zahm "publicly denounced and mathematically proved the fallacy of the vacuum principle"; however, the author does not give his source. De Bausset published a book on his design and offered an ownership interest of $150,000 in the Transcontinental Aerial Navigation Company of Chicago. His patent application was eventually denied on the basis that it was "wholly theoretical, everything being based upon calculation and nothing upon trial or demonstration."

=== Double wall fallacy ===
In 1921, Lavanda Armstrong disclosed a composite wall structure with a vacuum chamber "surrounded by a second envelope constructed so as to hold air under pressure, the walls of the envelope being spaced from one another and tied together", including a honeycomb-like cellular structure.

In 1983, David Noel discussed the use of a geodesic sphere covered with plastic film and "a double balloon containing pressurized air between the skins, and a vacuum in the centre".

In 1982–1985 Emmanuel Bliamptis elaborated on energy sources and use of "inflatable strut rings".

However, the double-wall design proposed by Armstrong, Noel, and Bliamptis would not have been buoyant. In order to avoid collapse, the air between the walls must have a minimum pressure (and therefore also a density) proportional to the fraction of the total volume occupied by the vacuum section, preventing the total density of the craft from being less than the surrounding air.

=== 21st century ===
In 2004–2007, to address issues of strength-to-weight ratios, Akhmeteli and Gavrilin addressed four materials, specifically I220H beryllium (elemental 99%), boron carbide ceramic, diamond-like carbon, and 5056 aluminum alloy (94.8% Al, 5% Mg, 0.12% Mn, 0.12%Cr) in a honeycomb double layer. In 2021, they extended this research; a "finite element analysis was employed to demonstrate that buckling can be prevented", focusing on a "shell of outer radius R > 2.11 m containing two boron carbide face skins of thickness 4.23 × 10^{−5} R each that are reliably bonded to an aluminum honeycomb core of thickness 3.52 × 10^{−3} R". At least two papers (in 2010 and 2016) have discussed the use of graphene as an outer membrane.

== Principle ==
An airship operates on the principle of buoyancy, according to Archimedes' principle. In an airship, air is the fluid in contrast to a traditional ship where water is the fluid.

The density of air at standard temperature and pressure is 1.28 g/L, so one liter of displaced air has sufficient buoyant force to lift 1.28 g. Airships use a bag to displace a large volume of air; the bag is usually filled with a lightweight gas such as helium or hydrogen. The total lift generated by an airship is equal to the weight of the air it displaces, minus the weight of the materials used in its construction, including the gas used to fill the bag.

Vacuum airships would replace the lifting gas with a near-vacuum environment. Having no mass, the density of this body would be near to 0.00 g/L, which would theoretically be able to provide the full lift potential of displaced air, so every liter of vacuum could lift 1.28 g. Using the molar volume, the mass of 1 liter of helium (at 1 atmospheres of pressure) is found to be 0.178 g. If helium is used instead of vacuum, the lifting power of every litre is reduced by 0.178 g, so the effective lift is reduced by 13.90625%. A 1-litre volume of hydrogen has a mass of 0.090 g, reducing the effective lift by 7.03125%.

The main problem with the concept of vacuum airships is that, with a near-vacuum inside the airbag, the exterior atmospheric pressure is not balanced by any internal pressure. This enormous imbalance of forces would cause the airbag to collapse unless it were extremely strong (in an ordinary airship, the force is balanced by the pressure of the lifting gas, making this unnecessary). Thus the difficulty is in constructing an airbag with the additional strength to resist this extreme net force, without weighing the structure down so much that the greater lifting power of the vacuum is negated.

== Material constraints ==
=== Compressive strength ===
From the analysis by Akhmeteli and Gavrilin:

The total force on a hemispherical shell of radius $R$ by an external pressure $P$ is $\pi R^2 P$. Since the force on each hemisphere has to balance along the equator, assuming $h<<R$ where $h$ is the shell thickness, the compressive stress ($\sigma$) will be:

$$\sigma = \pi R^2 P / 2 \pi R h = R P / 2 h$$

Neutral buoyancy occurs when the shell has the same mass as the displaced air, which occurs when $h/R = \rho_a/(3 \rho_s)$, where $\rho_a$ is the air density and $\rho_s$ is the shell density, assumed to be homogeneous. Combining with the stress equation gives

$$\sigma = (3/2)(\rho_s/\rho_a)P$$.

For aluminum and terrestrial conditions Akhmeteli and Gavrilin estimate the stress as $3.2\cdot 10^8$ Pa, of the same order of magnitude as the compressive strength of aluminum alloys.

=== Buckling ===
Akhmeteli and Gavrilin note, however, that the compressive strength calculation disregards buckling, and using R. Zoelli's formula for the critical buckling pressure of a sphere

$$P_{cr} = \frac{2Eh^2}{\sqrt{3(1-\mu^2)}}\frac{1}{R^2}$$

where $E$ is the modulus of elasticity and $\mu$ is the Poisson ratio of the shell. Substituting the earlier expression gives a necessary condition for a feasible vacuum balloon shell:

$$E/\rho_s^2 = \frac{9P_{cr}\sqrt{3(1-\mu^2)}}{2\rho_a^2}$$

The requirement is about $4.5\cdot10^5 \mathrm{kg}^{-1} \mathrm{m}^5 \mathrm{s}^{-2}$.

Akhmeteli and Gavrilin assert that this cannot even be achieved using diamond ($E/\rho_s^2 \approx 1\cdot 10^5$), and propose that dropping the assumption that the shell is a homogeneous material may allow lighter and stiffer structures (e.g. a honeycomb structure).

== Atmospheric constraints ==
A vacuum airship should at least float (Archimedes law) and resist external pressure (strength law, depending on design, like the above R. Zoelli's formula for sphere). These two conditions may be rewritten as an inequality where a complex of several physical constants related to the material of the airship is to be lesser than a complex of atmospheric parameters. Thus, for a sphere (hollow sphere and, to a lesser extent, cylinder are practically the only designs for which a strength law is known) it is $k_{\rm L} < \sqrt{1-\frac{P_{\rm int}}{P}}\cdot L_{\rm a}$, where $P_{\rm int}$ is pressure within the sphere, while $k_{\rm L}$ («Lana coefficient») and $L_{\rm a}$ («Lana atmospheric ratio») are:

$k_{\rm L} = 2.79\cdot \frac{\rho_s}{\rho_{\rm atm}} \cdot \sqrt{\frac{P_{\rm atm}}{E}} \cdot (1-\mu^2)^{0.25}$ (or, when $\mu$ is unknown, $k_{\rm L} \approx 2.71\cdot \frac{\rho_s}{\rho_{\rm atm}} \cdot \sqrt{\frac{P_{\rm atm}}{E}}$ with an error of order of 3% or less);
$L_{\rm a} = \frac{\rho_a}{\rho_{\rm atm}} \cdot \sqrt{\frac{P_{\rm atm}}{P}}$ (or, when $\rho_a$ is unknown, $L_{\rm a} = 10 \cdot \sqrt{\frac{P_{\rm atm}}{P}} \cdot \frac{M_a}{T_a}$),

where $P_{\rm atm} = 101325 \;\rm{Pa}$ and $\rho_{\rm atm} = 1.22$ $\rm{kg/m^3}$ are pressure and density of standard Earth atmosphere at sea level, $M_a$ and $T_a$ are molar mass (kg/kmol) and temperature (K) of atmosphere at floating area. Of all known planets and moons of the Sun system only the Venusian atmosphere has $L_{\rm a}$ big enough to surpass $k_{\rm L}$ for such materials as some composites (below altitude of ca. 15 km) and graphene (below altitude of ca. 40 km). Both materials may survive in the Venusian atmosphere. The equation for $L_{\rm a}$ shows that exoplanets with dense, cold and high-molecular ($\rm{CO}_2$, $\rm O_2$, $\rm N_2$ type) atmospheres may be suitable for vacuum airships, but it is a rare type of atmosphere.

== In fiction ==
In Edgar Rice Burroughs's novel Tarzan at the Earth's Core, Tarzan travels to Pellucidar in a vacuum airship constructed of the fictional material Harbenite.

In Passarola Rising, novelist Azhar Abidi imagines what might have happened had Bartolomeu de Gusmão built and flown a vacuum airship.

Spherical vacuum body airships using the Magnus effect and made of carbyne or similar superhard carbon are glimpsed in Neal Stephenson's novel The Diamond Age.

In Maelstrom and Behemoth:B-Max, author Peter Watts describes various flying devices, such as "botflies" (named after the botfly) and "lifters" that use "vacuum bladders" to keep them airborne.

In Feersum Endjinn by Iain M. Banks, a vacuum balloon is used by the narrative character Bascule in his quest to rescue Ergates. Vacuum dirigibles (airships) are also mentioned as a notable engineering feature of the space-faring utopian civilisation The Culture in Banks' novel Look to Windward, and the vast vacuum dirigible Equatorial 353 is a pivotal location in the final Culture novel, The Hydrogen Sonata.

== See also ==
- Aerostat
