= Conrad Airship CA 80 =

CA 80

General information
- Type: Dirigible
- National origin: United States
- Manufacturer: Conrad Airships

History
- Manufactured: 1975–1977

The CA 80 is a dirigible that was developed by the Conrad Airship Company founder Clarence “Clare” Conrad.

== Design and development ==
The CA 80 is an aluminum truss rigid airship formed in the classic "Flying saucer" shape. It features a single rudder and a central shaft running vertically through its center. Helium is contained with internal mylar bags. It was intended to seat up to eight passengers. Three engines are fitted, one for vertical thrust, one for forward and one for directional control. The first prototype was destroyed in a windstorm.

== Specifications (CA 80) ==
Data from Air Progress

General characteristics

- Crew: 2
- Capacity: 6
- Length: 80 ft (24 m)
- Width: 80 ft (24 m)
- Height: 27 ft (8.2 m)
- Volume: 70,000 cu ft (2,000 m^{3})
- Gross weight: 4,500 lb (2,041 kg)
- Powerplant: 1 × Mercury Outboard, 150 hp (110 kW)
- Powerplant: 2 × Evinrude Outboard, 130 hp (97 kW) each

Performance

- Maximum speed: 65 kn (75 mph, 121 km/h)
- Cruise speed: 35 kn (40 mph, 64 km/h)
