= List of Zeppelins =

This is a complete list of Zeppelins constructed by the German Zeppelin companies from 1900 until 1938. Other rigid airships that are also sometimes referred to as zeppelins but not built by Zeppelin are not included.

The Zeppelin company based in Friedrichshafen, Germany, numbered their aircraft LZ 1/2/ ..., with LZ standing for "Luftschiff [airship] Zeppelin". Additionally, craft used for civilian purposes were named, whereas military airships were usually given "tactical numbers":

- The Deutsches Heer called its first Zeppelins Z I/II/ ... /XI/XII. During World War I they switched to using LZ numbers, later adding 30 to obscure the total production.
- The Kaiserliche Marine's Zeppelins were labelled L 1/2/ ....

Since 1997, airships of the new type Zeppelin NT have been flying. They are not included here. They are not rigid airships and do not represent a continuity of design from the ones listed here.

== Zeppelins finished before World War I ==
Production number	Class	Name/ tactical number	Usage	First flight	Remarks	Fate	Image
LZ 1	A		experimental	2 July 1900	Three flights, during which the prior speed record achieved by La France was exceeded, dismantled in 1901 due to lack of funds.	Dismantled in 1901	
LZ 2	B		experimental	17 January 1906		Damaged beyond repair on 18 January 1906	
LZ 3	B	Z I	experimental; Army	9 October 1906	The first Zeppelin to be truly successful. Made a number of flights of significant duration before being enlarged and bought by the German Army in 1908. Used for training until decommissioned in 1913.	Decommissioned in 1913	
LZ 4	C		Army (intended)	20 June 1908	Completed a 12-hour flight on 1 July 1908; attempted 24-hour endurance flight on 4 August 1908, but landed near Echterdingen after 12 hours to repair an engine. Destroyed when strong winds broke its mooring cables.	Destroyed in storm near Echterdingen on 4 August 1908	
LZ 5	C	Z II	Army	26 May 1909	Torn from moorings during a storm and wrecked near Weilburg on 25 March 1910	Destroyed in storm near Weilburg, Germany on 25 March 1910	
LZ 6	D	Z III	Army, DELAG	25 August 1909	First experiments with wireless communication; first airship operated by DELAG (Deutsche Luftschiffahrts-Aktiengesellschaft – German airship transport company); accidentally destroyed by fire in its hangar at Oos, Baden-Baden on 14 September 1910.	Burnt in its hangar at Baden-Baden, Germany on 14 September 1910	
LZ 7	E	Deutschland	DELAG	19 June 1910	Damaged beyond repair after crashing during a thunderstorm over the Teutoburg Forest on 28 June 1910	Destroyed in a storm in German Teutoburg Forest on 28 June 1910	
LZ 8	E	Deutschland II	DELAG	30 March 1911	Caught by a strong crosswind while being walked out of its hangar and damaged beyond repair on 16 May 1911	Destroyed in storm in Germany on 16 May 1911	
LZ 9	F	Ersatz Z II	Army	2 October 1911	Used as school and training ship	Decommissioned 1 August 1914	
LZ 10	F	Schwaben	DELAG	26 June 1911	Carried 1,553 passengers in 218 commercial flights. On 28 June 1912 the Schwaben caught fire after a strong gust tore it from its moorings near Düsseldorf, injuring some of the ground handling party.	Destroyed in a storm in Germany on 28 June 1912	
LZ 11	G	Viktoria Luise	DELAG; later military	19 February 1912	After use by DELAG, taken over as a training airship by the German military upon the outbreak of World War I; broke apart while being hangared on 1 October 1915.	Broke apart on 1 October 1915	
LZ 12	F	Z III	Army	25 April 1912		Decommissioned 1 August 1914	
LZ 13	G	Hansa/ LZ 13	DELAG; later Navy then Army	30 July 1912	travelled 44,437 km (27,612 mi; 23,994 nmi) in 399 flights; first passenger flight outside Germany, commanded by Graf von Zeppelin for visit to Denmark and Sweden on 19 September 1912; Impressed by the German Army at the start of World War I and used for reconnaissance missions over the Baltic Sea and bombing missions over France. Used as a training ship from spring 1915.	Decommissioned August 1916	
LZ 14	H	L 1	Navy	7 October 1912	Helgoland Island Air Disaster: brought down into the North Sea during a thunderstorm on 9 September 1913, drowning 14 crew members. These were the first Zeppelin fatalities.	Destroyed in a storm over the North Sea on 9 September 1913	
LZ 15	H	Ersatz Z I	Army	16 January 1913		Destroyed in a forced landing on 19 March 1913	
LZ 16	H	Z IV	Army	14 March 1913	Accidentally crossed the French border on 3 April 1913 due to a navigational error in poor visibility, and landed on the parade ground at Lunéville, allowing the French to examine it in detail. Used for reconnaissance over East Prussia in August 1914 and bombed Warsaw on 24 September 1914. Later used for training before being decommissioned in the autumn of 1916.	Decommissioned in the autumn of 1916	
LZ 17	H	Sachsen/ LZ 17	DELAG; later Navy then Army	3 May 1913	Transported 9,837 passengers in 419 flights, travelling 39,919 km (24,805 mi; 21,555 nmi); taken over by German military at the start of World War I in 1914; this was Captain Lehmann's first command; it had bomb racks and bombardier's station fitted, together with an improved radio room, machine guns in the cars below and a gunners' nest in the tail; In its first attack on Antwerp it carried 820 kg (1,810 lb) of bombs and spent 12 hours in the air.	Decommissioned in autumn of 1916	
LZ 18	I	L 2	Navy	9 September 1913	Johannisthal Air Disaster: destroyed by an explosion caused by escaped hydrogen being sucked into an engine compartment during a test flight on 17 October 1913; entire crew killed.	Destroyed by an explosion on 17 October 1913	
LZ 19	H	Second Ersatz Z I	Army	6 June 1913		Damaged beyond repair after a forced landing 13 June 1914	
LZ 20	H	Z V	Army	8 July 1913	Used early in World War I for reconnaissance missions in Western Poland; forced landing due to damage from ground fire after an attack on Mława during the Battle of Tannenberg: crew captured.	Crashed Near Allenstein, East Prussia (today Olsztyn, Poland) during 26–30 August 1914	
LZ 21	K	Z VI	Army	10 November 1913	Carried out first airship bombing mission of World War 1 on 6 August 1914 when it bombed Liège, using artillery shells instead of bombs. Inadequate lift restricted it to low altitude so bullets and shrapnel from defending fire holed the gasbags. The ship limped to Cologne but grounded in a forest near Bonn, wrecking it.	Crashed in Cologne, Germany on 6 August 1914	
LZ 22	L	Z VII	Army	8 January 1914	Limited to a ceiling of around 1,600 m (5,200 ft), on 21 August 1914 Z VII was sent to find the retreating French Army around the Vosges mountains in Alsace, and drop bombs on the camps. After passing through clouds Z VII found itself right above the main army, whose small-arms fire penetrated many gas cells. Leaking heavily, the crew force-landed the airship near St. Quirin, Lorraine.	Force-landed near St. Quirin, France on 21 August 1914	
LZ 23	L	Z VIII	Army	11 May 1914	Under the same orders as Z VII on 21 August 1914, Z VIII engaged the French army while at an altitude of a few hundred feet. According to Lehmann Z VIII received "thousands of bullets and shell splinters", forcing it to drift and make a forced landing in no man's land near Badonviller. The crew destroyed documents and tried to ignite the wreck but so little gas remained it would not burn: the crew were captured by the French.	Crashed in France on 23 August 1914	
LZ 24	M	L 3	Navy	11 May 1914	After 24 reconnaissance missions over the North Sea, L 3 participated in the first raid on England on 19 January 1915. On 17 February 1915 abandoned after a forced landing in Denmark, caused by engine failure compounded by strong headwinds and insufficient fuel. The wind was so strong it blew the airship, now unmanned but with engines still running, out to sea.	Disappeared over North Sea on 17 February 1915	
LZ 25	M	Z IX	Army	13 July 1914	Used for reconnaissance and bombing missions in northern France; on 25 August 1914 nine bombs dropped on Antwerp killed or wounded 26 people and damaged a royal palace. The Belgian royal family were in residence and the attack was widely condemned. Destroyed in its hangar at Düsseldorf on 8 October 1914 by bombs dropped by Flt Lt. (later Air Vice Marshal) Reginald Marix, RNAS flying a Sopwith Tabloid.	Burnt in its hangar at Düsseldorf, Germany on 8 October 1914	

== Zeppelins constructed during World War I ==
Production number	Class	Tactical numbering	First flight	Remarks	Fate	Image
LZ 26	N	Z XII	14 December 1914	Z XII made 11 attacks in northern France and at the eastern front, dropping 20,000 kg (44,000 lb) of bombs; by the summer of 1915 Z 12 had dropped around 9,000 kg (20,000 lb) of bombs on the Warsaw to Petrograd trunk railway line between the stations at Malkina and Białystok. One flight carried a load of 3,000 kg (6,600 lb).	Decommissioned 8 August 1917.	
LZ 27	M	L 4	18 August 1914	Flew 11 reconnaissance missions over the North Sea, participated in the first raid over England on 20 January 1915. Forced landing in Blavandshuk on 17 February 1915 during a storm; 11 crew interned, with four members lost when the airship subsequently blew out to sea.	Disappeared over the North Sea 17 February 1915	
LZ 28	M	L 5	22 September 1914	Flew 47 reconnaissance missions over the North Sea and Baltic; proved especially useful in discovering enemy mines. Two attack missions, dropping 700 kg (1,500 lb) bombs. Damaged beyond repair during an attack on Dünamünde (now in Latvia) by Russian air defenses on 7 August 1915.	Shot down Eastern front 7 August 1915	
LZ 29	M	Z X	13 October 1914	Two attacks on Calais and Paris, dropping 1,800 kg (4,000 lb) of bombs; on the way back Z X was damaged by enemy fire and dismantled after a forced landing at Saint-Quentin.	Crashed in St. Quentin, France 21 March 1915	
LZ 30	M	Z XI	15 November 1914	Used for raids on Warsaw, Grodno and other targets on the Eastern front. Burned out while being walked out of its hangar at Posen (now in Poland) on 20 May 1915.	Destroyed in an accident Eastern front on 20 May 1915	
LZ 31	M	L 6	3 November 1914	Took part in the German defence during the Cuxhaven Raid on 25 December 1914, unsuccessfully attacking HMS Empress; 36 reconnaissance missions around North Sea, including marking mine fields; one raid on England, dropping 700 kg (1,500 lb) of bombs. Caught fire during inflation in its hangar at Fuhlsbüttel and destroyed with LZ 36 on 16 September 1916.	Burned in hangar on 16 September 1916	
LZ 32	M	L 7	20 November 1914	Flew 77 reconnaissance missions over the North Sea, with several unsuccessful attempts to attack English coastal towns. Brought down on 4 May 1916 by anti-aircraft fire from HMS Phaeton and HMS Galatea and wreck was destroyed by RN HMS E31	Shot down by submarine over the North Sea 4 May 1916	
LZ 33	M	L 8	17 December 1914	Used for reconnaissance missions along the western front. Brought down by anti-aircraft fire at Tienen, Belgium on 5 March 1915.	Shot down near Tienen, Belgium on 5 March 1915	
LZ 34	M	LZ 34	6 January 1915	Carried out two raids on the eastern front, dropping 1,110 kg (2,450 lb) of bombs. Heavily damaged by enemy fire on 21 June 1915 and burnt near Insterburg.	Burnt near Insterburg on 21 June 1915	
LZ 35	M	LZ 35	11 January 1915	Two raids on Paris and Poperinge (Belgium), dropping 2,420 kg (5,340 lb) of bombs; enemy fire forced it down near Aeltre (Belgium), then destroyed by a storm.	Destroyed by a storm near Aeltre, Belgium 13 April 1915	
LZ 36	O	L 9	8 March 1915	74 reconnaissance missions in the North Sea; four raids on England dropping 5,683 kg (12,529 lb) of bombs; attacked several British submarines. Burnt out in its hangar on 16 September 1916 together with LZ 31.	Burnt in hangar on 16 September 1916	
LZ 37	M	LZ 37	4 March 1915	Based at Gontrode, shot down by Flt Sub-Lt R Warneford, 1 Sqdn RNAS, flying a Morane-Saulnier Type L, during its first raid on Calais on 7 June 1915 and crashing at Sint-Amandsberg, near Ghent. Warneford was awarded a VC for his actions.	Shot down near Ghent, Belgium 7 June 1915	
LZ 38	P	LZ 38	3 April 1915	Joined the first bombing raid on London on 31 May 1915, killing 7 people and injuring 35 while causing £18,596 damage, five successful raids on Ipswich, Ramsgate, Southend (twice) and London, dropping 8,360 kg (18,430 lb) of bombs. Destroyed by British bombers in its hangar at Evere on 7 June 1915.	Burnt in hangar at Evere 7 June 1915	
LZ 39	O	LZ 39	24 April 1915	Extensively damaged on 17 May 1915 by Flt Commander Bigsworth. Three raids on the western and two on the eastern front, dropping 4,184 kg (9,224 lb) of bombs. On 17 December 1915, captained by Dr. Lempertz, LZ 39 was hit by shrapnel during an attack on Rovno. All rear gas cells were punctured and the front engine car was hit and later fell off. The crew abandoned the now-overstressed control cabin, dropped ballast and shifted loads to rebalance the ship and used an emergency control station in the rear to limp back to Germany. Upon forced landing the ship collapsed because material for repair and the supply of gas needed to refill the cells were not available.	Decommissioned 17 December 1915	
LZ 40	P	L 10	13 May 1915	8 reconnaissance missions around the North Sea; 5 attacks on England dropping 9,900 kg (21,800 lb) of bombs. Struck by lightning on 3 September 1915 and crashed near Cuxhaven killing 19 crew members.	Struck by lightning and burned near Cuxhaven 3 September 1915	
LZ 41	P	L 11	7 June 1915	31 reconnaissance missions, notably during the Battle of Jutland; 12 raids on England dropping 15,543 kg (34,266 lb) of bombs. Significant raid on Sunderland on 1 April 1916, when 22 people died. Dismantled on 25 April 1917 as obsolete.	Dismantled 25 April 1917	
LZ 42	P	LZ 72	15 June 1915	Only used as a training ship due to poor quality metal used	Decommissioned 16 February 1917	
LZ 43	P	L 12	21 June 1915	5 reconnaissance missions; came down in the English Channel from damage by A.A. fire after bombing Dover. Towed to Ostend on 10 August 1915 but burnt during salvage operation.	Burnt in Ostend, Belgium 10 August 1915	
LZ 44	P	LZ 74	8 July 1915	Two attacks on England dropping 3,500 kg (7,700 lb) of bombs; wrecked when it flew into a mountain in the Schnee Eifel on 8 October 1915.	Crashed into a Schnee Eifel mountain, Germany on 8 October 1915	
LZ 45	P	L 13	23 July 1915	45 reconnaissance missions, including one in which it played a significant part in the action of 19 August 1916; 15 attacks on England dropping 20,667 kg (45,563 lb) of bombs; decommissioned on 25 April 1917	Decommissioned on 25 April 1917	
LZ 46	P	L 14	9 August 1915	Most successful German Navy airship; 42 reconnaissance missions; 17 attacks on Britain dropping 22,045 kg (48,601 lb) of bombs; taken out of service during 1917 and 1918.	Destroyed by its crew on 23 June 1919.	
LZ 47	P	LZ 77	24 August 1915	6 attacks on England and France dropping 12,610 kg (27,800 lb) of bombs. Destroyed by enemy fire on 21 February 1916 in the Battle of Verdun, killing the crew of 15. Reports at the time indicated LZ 77 had searchlights, eight machine guns, two so-called 'revolver' guns in the top lookout post, was accompanied by fixed-wing aircraft and at least one other Zeppelin and had orders to bomb nearby railway lines.	Destroyed in the Battle of Verdun 21 February 1916	
LZ 48	P	L 15	9 September 1915	8 reconnaissance missions; 3 attacks on England dropping 5,780 kg (12,740 lb) of bombs. Damaged by ground fire from Dartford AA battery during a raid on London on 1 April 1916, it came down at Kentish Knock Deep in the Thames estuary. 1 crew member was killed, the other 17 were taken prisoner.	Shot down Thames estuary 1 April 1916	
LZ 49	P	LZ 79	2 August 1915	Dropped 4,440 kg (9,790 lb) of bombs in two attacks on Brest-Litovsk and Kovel and one attack on Paris on 30 January 1916; hit by French fire and damaged beyond repair in forced landing near Ath, Belgium.	Crashed Ath, Belgium on 30 January 1916	
LZ 50	P	L 16	23 September 1915	44 reconnaissance missions; 12 attacks on England dropping 18,048 kg (39,789 lb) of bombs; delivered supplies to German isles in winter 1916. Damaged beyond repair during a training mission at Nordholz Naval Airbase on 19 October 1917.	Destroyed in Germany on 19 October 1917	
LZ 51	P	LZ 81	7 October 1915	Used at the South-Eastern and the Western Front; transported a diplomatic commission to Sofia on 9 November 1915; one attack on Étaples (France) and two attacks on Bucharest, dropping 4,513 kg (9,949 lb) of bombs; damaged by ground fire over Bucharest, crashed near Turnovo (Bulgaria) on 27 September 1916.	Crashed near Turnovo (Bulgaria) on 27 September 1916	
LZ 52	P	L 18	3 November 1915	Burned out in hangar at Tondern during refilling on 17 November 1915.	Burned in hangar on 17 November 1915	
LZ 53	P	L 17	20 October 1915	27 reconnaissance missions; nine attacks on England dropping 10,724 kg (23,642 lb) bombs. Burned in its hangar at Tondern on 28 December 1916 when LZ 69 caught fire.	Burned in hangar on 28 December 1916	
LZ 54	P	L 19	27 November 1915	Raided England on 31 January 1916, dropping 1,600 kg (3,500 lb) of bombs. On 2 February 1916 after a raid on England with three engines failing, it came under neutral Dutch fire and sank in the North Sea, drowning all crew members as nearby English fishing trawler King Stephen refused any help to them. In the last hours Kapitän-Leutnant Loewe and his crew dropped into the sea their last messages, which washed up six months later in Sweden. On 23 April 1916 Torpedo boat G41 attacked and sank the King Stephen, taking its crew prisoner.	Shot down in North Sea 23 April 1916	
LZ 55	P	LZ 85	12 September 1915	6 attacks dropping 14,200 kg (31,300 lb) of bombs on Dünaburg (Latvia), Minsk, the railroads of Riga, and Saloniki (twice); damaged by fire from the battleship HMS Agamemnon on 5 May 1916, it came down in the Vardar marshes. The crew of 12 were captured.	Shot down Vardar, Greece on 5 May 1916	
LZ 56	P	LZ 86	10 October 1915	7 attacks dropping 14,800 kg (32,600 lb) of bombs along the Eastern and South-Eastern front; crashed on 5 September 1916 at Temesvar, killing nine of the crew after being damaged during a raid on the Ploiești oil refineries.	Crashed near Temesvar, Austria-Hungary on 5 September 1916	
LZ 57	P	LZ 87	6 December 1915	2 attacks on Ramsgate and Margate dropping 3,000 kg (6,600 lb) of bombs; in July 1916 handed to the German Navy; 16 reconnaissance missions around the Baltic Sea; later used as a school ship. Decommissioned 28 July 1917 at Jüterbog as obsolete.	Decommissioned 28 July 1917	
LZ 58	P	LZ 88 / L 25	14 November 1915	14 reconnaissance missions; 3 attacks dropping 4,249 kg (9,367 lb) of bombs along the Western Front; in January 1917 handed to the German Navy who used it for experimental purposes.	Decommissioned 15 September 1917.	
LZ 59	Q	L 20	21 November 1915	6 reconnaissance missions; 2 attacks on England dropping 2,864 kg (6,314 lb) bombs; ran out of fuel after raiding Scotland on 3 May 1916, drifted and stranded near Stavanger (Norway). The crew destroyed the airship. 16 were captured, 3 died. Kapitänleutnant Stabbert escaped six months later.	Crashed Stavanger, Norway on 3 May 1916	
LZ 60	P	LZ 90	1 January 1916	4 attacks on Bar-le-Duc, Norwich, London and Étaples, dropping 8,860 kg (19,530 lb) of bombs; on 7 November 1916 broke loose in a storm and blown out to sea and was never seen again.	Disappeared over the North Sea on 7 November 1916	
LZ 61	Q	L 21	10 January 1916	17 reconnaissance missions; 10 attacks on England dropping 14,442 kg (31,839 lb) of bombs. Intercepted and destroyed by Flight–Lieutenant Egbert Cadbury, flying BE 2C, No. 8265, Flight Sub–Lieutenant Gerard William Reginald Fane, flying RAF BE 2C No. 8421 and Flight Sub–Lieutenant Edward Laston Pulling, flying BE 2C, No. 8626, firing phosphor rounds. L 21 caught fire and fell into the sea about eight miles east of Lowestoft on 28 November 1916. There were no survivors.	Crashed in North Sea on 28 November 1916	
LZ 62	R	L 30	28 May 1916	First of the Type R "Super-Zeppelin" class, it had a volume of 55,200 m^{3}. Ten raids on England dropping 23,305 kg (51,379 lb) of bombs; 31 reconnaissance missions above the North and Baltic Seas and at the Eastern Front; retired on 17 November 1917 and laid up at Seerappen. In 1920 ordered to be transferred to Belgium as part of war reparations, where it was dismantled. Some components, including an engine car, are preserved at the Royal Army and Military History Museum, Brussels.	Transferred to Belgium in 1920	
LZ 63	P	LZ 93	23 February 1916	Three attacks on Dunkirk, Mardick and Harwich, dropping 3,240 kg (7,140 lb) bombs.	Decommissioned in August 1917	
LZ 64	Q	L 22	3 March 1916	Thirty reconnaissance missions; 8 attacks on Britain, dropping 9,215 kg (20,316 lb) of bombs; destroyed by RNAS Curtis H12 flying boat flown by Flight Commander Robert Leckie (later Air Vice Marshal) near Terschelling on 14 May 1917 during a reconnaissance mission. (Leckie was also credited in the downing of LZ 112)	Shot down near Holland on 14 May 1917	
LZ 65	Q	LZ 95	1 February 1916	Destroyed by French anti-aircraft fire on 21 February 1916 during an attempted attack on Vitry-le-François.	Shot down over France on 21 February 1916	
LZ 66	Q	L 23	8 April 1916	51 reconnaissance missions; 3 attacks on England dropping 5,254 kg (11,583 lb) of bombs; captured Norwegian ship "Royal" in the North Sea on 23 April 1917. Destroyed on 21 August 1917 by 2nd Lt Bernard A. Smart flying a Sopwith Pup launched from a platform on the cruiser HMS Yarmouth. Smart later led the Tondern raid which destroyed LZ 99 & LZ 108.	Shot down over North Sea on 21 August 1917	
LZ 67	Q	LZ 97	4 April 1916	Four attacks on London (twice), Boulogne and, later, Bucharest, dropping 5,760 kg (12,700 lb) of bombs, plus several unsuccessful flights due to bad weather.	Decommissioned on 5 July 1917.	
LZ 68	Q	LZ 98	28 April 1916	One attack on London dropping 1,513 kg (3,336 lb) bombs, plus several flights aborted due to bad weather; handed to the German Navy in November 1916; 15 reconnaissance missions around the Baltic Sea.	Decommissioned in August 1917.	
LZ 69	Q	L 24	20 May 1916	19 reconnaissance missions around the North Sea; 4 raids on England dropping 8,510 kg (18,760 lb) of bombs; crashed into a wall while being taken into its hangar on 28 December 1916 and burned out together with LZ 53.	Burned in hangar 28 December 1916	
LZ 70	Not built due to conversion to larger ship type					
LZ 71	Q	LZ 101	29 June 1916	Stationed in Yambol (Bulgaria); 7 attacks dropping 11,934 kg (26,310 lb) of bombs on Bucharest, Ciulnița, Fetești, Galați, Odessa, Mytilene, Iași and Mudros.	Dismantled in September 1917.	
LZ 72	R	L 31	12 July 1916	One reconnaissance mission in fleet operation against Sunderland; 6 attacks on England dropping 19,411 kg (42,794 lb) of bombs; with LZ 74, LZ 76 and LZ 78 as part of Zeppelin raid on night of 23 September 1916; intercepted and destroyed by British fighter pilot Lt. W. Tempest on 2 October 1916 near Potters Bar, north of London, while commanded by the leading airship commander of the time, Kapitän Leutnant Heinrich Mathy, who died with his entire crew after jumping from the burning Zeppelin. The crew were buried at Potters Bar but were later exhumed and reburied at Cannock Chase.	Shot down near London on 2 October 1916	
LZ 73	Q	LZ 103	23 August 1916	One successful attack on Calais dropping 1,530 kg (3,370 lb) of bombs (other attacks cancelled or aborted due to poor weather)	Decommissioned in August 1917	
LZ 74	R	L 32	4 August 1916	Three attacks on England dropping 6,860 kg (15,120 lb) of bombs; commanded by Kapitan-Leutnant Werner Petersen, with LZ 72, LZ 76 and LZ 78 part of Zeppelin raid on the night of 23 September 1916; destroyed by 2nd Lt Frederick Sowrey, of 39 Home Defence Squadron, in a Royal Aircraft Factory BE.2C on 24 September 1916 near Great Burstead, Essex, all the crew dying. The crew's bodies were buried at Great Burstead, then exhumed in 1966 and reburied at Cannock Chase.	Shot down in Essex on 24 September 1916	
LZ 75	R	L 37	9 November 1916	17 reconnaissance missions around the North and Baltic Sea and England; 4 raids dropping 6,450 kg (14,220 lb) of bombs; retired on 24 December 1917	Transferred to Japan in 1920	
LZ 76	R	L 33	30 August 1916	Part of the Zeppelin group that bombed London and surrounding counties (L 31, L 32, L 33 and L 34) on the night of 23 September 1916; during its first mission, in which 3200 kg bombs had been dropped, after an anti-aircraft shell seriously damaged it, commander Kapitan-Leutnant Alois Bocker turned over Essex and was attacked by 39 Home Defence Squadron night fighters from Hainault Farm and hit several times (credit for disabling given to B.E.2c No. 4544 piloted by Alfred de Bathe Brandon), but even after dropping guns and equipment Bocker decided it would not make it back across the North Sea, forced landing in Little Wigborough, Essex 24 September 1916 with no fatalities, the crew were only partly successful in burning the hull, and British engineers examined the skeleton and later used the plans as a basis for the construction of airships R33 and R34, itself the first-ever east–west trans-Atlantic aircraft of any type.	Shot down in Essex on 24 September 1916	
LZ 77	Q	LZ 107	16 October 1916	One attack on Boulogne, France, dropping 1,440 kg (3,170 lb) of bombs (several other raids being cancelled or aborted).	Decommissioned in July 1917.	
LZ 78	R	L 34	22 September 1916	Three reconnaissance missions; two attacks on England dropping 3,890 kg (8,580 lb) of bombs; took part in the Zeppelin raid which also involved the L 31, L 32 and L 33 on the night of 23 September 1916, and was the only Zeppelin that survived the raid; intercepted and destroyed by British fighter pilot 2nd Lt Ian Pyott in BE2c no. 2738 off Hartlepool on 27 November 1916.	Shot down near Hartlepool on 27 November 1916.	
LZ 79	R	L 41	15 January 1917	15 reconnaissance missions around the North Sea; four attacks on England dropping 6,567 kg (14,478 lb) of bombs; used as a school ship from 11 December 1917.	Destroyed by its crew on 23 June 1919.	
LZ 80	R	L 35	20 October 1916	13 reconnaissance missions around the North and Baltic Sea; three attacks on England dropping 4,284 kg (9,445 lb) of bombs	Decommissioned in September 1918.	
LZ 81	Q	LZ 111	20 December 1916	Not used in the German Army and transferred to Navy in May 1917; 7 reconnaissance missions around the Baltic Sea	Decommissioned on 10 August 1917.	
LZ 82	R	L 36	1 November 1916	20 flights around the North Sea and England, including four reconnaissance missions; damaged during landing in fog at Rehben-an-der-Aller on 7 February 1917 and decommissioned.	Decommissioned in Germany on 7 February 1917	
LZ 83	R	LZ 113	22 February 1917	15 reconnaissance missions around the Eastern Front and the Baltic Sea; three attacks dropping 6,000 kg (13,000 lb) of bombs.	Transferred to France as part of war reparations in 1920	
LZ 84	R	L 38	22 November 1916	Damaged beyond repair in a forced landing (due to heavy snowfall) during an attempted raid on Reval and Saint Petersburg on 29 December 1916	Destroyed in Saint Petersburg on 29 December 1916	
LZ 85	R	L 45	12 April 1917	12 reconnaissance missions around the North Sea; 3 attacks on England dropping 4,700 kg (10,400 lb) of bombs. Ran out of fuel on 20 October 1917 and destroyed in forced landing near Sisteron, France, the crew being taken captive.	Crashed near Sisteron, France, on 20 October 1917	
LZ 86	R	L 39	11 December 1916	Two reconnaissance missions around the North Sea; one attack on England dropping 300 kg bombs, and on return destroyed by French flak near Compiègne on 17 March 1917.	Shot down near Compiègne on 17 March 1917	
LZ 87	R	L 47	11 May 1917	18 reconnaissance missions and three attacks dropping 3,240 kg (7,140 lb) of bombs around the North Sea and England. On 5 January 1918, a giant explosion in the air base in Ahlhorn destroyed four Zeppelins (including L 47) and one non-Zeppelin built airship, housed in one adjacent hangar and two 0.5 mi (0.80 km) away.	Burned in hangar on 5 January 1918	
LZ 88	R	L 40	3 January 1917	7 reconnaissance missions; 2 attacks on England, dropping 3,105 kg (6,845 lb) of bombs. Damaged beyond repair while landing on 16 June 1917 in Nordholz.	Crashed in Nordholz, Germany on 16 June 1917	
LZ 89	R	L 50	9 June 1917	5 reconnaissance missions around the North Sea; two attacks on England dropping 4,135 kg (9,116 lb) of bombs. Ran out of fuel on 20 October 1917 and, after the control car had been torn off as a result of an attempt to crash the airship to prevent it falling into enemy hands near Danmartin, it was blown over the Mediterranean with five crew members still on board. 16 crew were captured	Disappeared over the Mediterranean on 20 October 1917	
LZ 90	R	LZ 120	31 January 1917	17 reconnaissance missions and 3 attacks dropping 11,250 kg (24,800 lb) of bombs around the Eastern Front and the Baltic Sea. Retired on 8 October 1917; in 1920 ordered to be transferred to Italy as war reparations, where it broke apart one year later while gas was removed.	Transferred to Italy in 1920	
LZ 91	S	L 42	21 February 1917	First of the Height-Climber S class, which had a lightened structure to improve maximum altitude. 20 reconnaissance missions; 4 attacks on England dropping 6,030 kg (13,290 lb) of bombs; used as a school ship from 6 June 1918.	Destroyed by its crew on 23 June 1919.	
LZ 92	S	L 43	6 March 1917	6 reconnaissance missions; one attack on English docks, dropping 1,850 kg (4,080 lb) of bombs. Shot down by British fighter aircraft on 14 June 1917 during reconnaissance mission. Attacked HMAS Sydney on 4 May 1917.	Shot down off Vlieland, Holland on 14 June 1917	
LZ 93	T	L 44	1 April 1917	8 reconnaissance missions; 4 attacks on England and Royal Navy units. Driven south to France by a heavy storm, it was shot down over Lunéville on 20 October 1917.	Shot down over Lunéville, France on 20 October 1917	
LZ 94	T	L 46	24 April 1917	19 reconnaissance missions around the North Sea; 3 raids on England dropping 5,700 kg (12,600 lb) of bombs. Destroyed in the Ahlhorn explosion.	Burned in hangar Ahlhorn, Germany on 5 January 1918	
LZ 95	U	L 48	22 May 1917	One successful reconnaissance mission. Joined attempted attack on London with 3 others, became lost and was intercepted and destroyed by British fighters over water near Great Yarmouth on 17 June 1917 and crashing near Theberton, Suffolk, a village near the town of Leiston. Three survivors; crew buried at Theberton, later to be exhumed and reburied at Cannock Chase.	Shot down near Great Yarmouth on 17 June 1917	
LZ 96	U	L 49	13 June 1917	Two reconnaissance missions around the North Sea; one raid on England dropping 2,100 kg (4,600 lb) of bombs; while returning, forced to land near Bourbonne-les-Bains on 20 October 1917 and captured almost undamaged by French forces. The design of LZ 96 influenced the design of the first American rigid airship, the USS Shenandoah (ZR-1) and the British R38.	Crashed near Bourbonne-les-Bains, France on 20 October 1917	
LZ 97	U	L 51	6 June 1917	3 reconnaissance missions; one raid on the English coast, dropping 280 kg bombs. Destroyed in the Ahlhorn explosion.	Burned in hangar Ahlhorn, Germany on 5 January 1918	
LZ 98	U	L 52	14 July 1917	20 reconnaissance missions; accidentally taken above London by an unexpected storm during a raid, it dropped 2,020 kg (4,450 lb) of bombs there.	Destroyed by its crew on 23 June 1919.	
LZ 99	U	L 54	13 August 1917	14 reconnaissance missions; two attacks on England dropping 5,840 kg (12,870 lb) of bombs; destroyed together with LZ 108 when seven RNAS Sopwith Camel fighters, launched from the aircraft carrier HMS Furious, bombed the Toska hangar at Tondern, now Tønder, Denmark. (Only two fighters returned to the Furious, though three of the others landed in Denmark after running low on fuel.)	Burned in hangar Tondern, Germany on 19 July 1918	
LZ 100	V	L 53	8 August 1917	19 reconnaissance missions; 4 attacks on England, dropping 11,930 kg (26,300 lb) of bombs. Intercepted and destroyed by a Sopwith Camel flown by Lt Culley RAF, who took off from a lighter towed by the destroyer HMS Redoubt, on 11 August 1918. LZ 100 was the last zeppelin destroyed in the war.	Shot down in North Sea on 11 August 1918	
LZ 101	V	L 55	1 September 1917	Two attacks dropping 5,450 kg (12,020 lb) of bombs. Heavily damaged in the second one on 19 October 1917, it drifted behind western front and rose to a Zeppelin all-time record altitude of 7,600 m (24,900 ft) to escape; then dismantled upon forced landing.	Crashed on 19 October 1917	
LZ 102	W	L 57	26 September 1917	Not used in combat. Intended for use in Africa. Damaged beyond repair by heavy wind near Jüterbog on 8 October 1917.	Destroyed in a storm on 8 October 1917.	
LZ 103	V	L 56	24 September 1917	17 reconnaissance missions; participated in the last raid on England on 6 August 1918.	Destroyed by its crew on 23 June 1919.	
LZ 104	W	L 59	30 October 1917	Known as Das Afrika-Schiff ("The Africa Ship"), stationed in Yambol (Bulgaria); LZ 104 started out on a resupply mission to German East Africa. However, British forces had advanced to the designated landing zone, forcing the German admiralty to abort the mission and recall the ship while west of Khartoum. Nevertheless, LZ 104 set a long-distance flight record of (6,757 km (4,199 mi) in 95 hours and 5 minutes) or nearly 4 days in the air. The ship met its end on 7 April 1918 when it crashed into the waters of the Strait of Otranto with the loss of all 21 crew.	Crashed in sea, Strait of Otranto, Italy on 7 April 1918	
LZ 105	V	L 58	29 October 1917	Two reconnaissance missions; destroyed in the Ahlhorn explosion.	Burned in hangar Ahlhorn, Germany on 5 January 1918	
LZ 106	V	L 61	12 December 1917	9 reconnaissance missions; two attacks on England dropping 4,500 kg (9,900 lb) of bombs; in 1920 ordered to be transferred to Italy as war reparations.	Transferred to Italy in 1920	
LZ 107	V	L 62	19 January 1918	Two reconnaissance missions; two attacks on England dropping 5,923 kg (13,058 lb) of bombs; on the raid on 12/13 April 1918 her gunners managed to damage and drive away an attacking airplane, the only known instance of this happening. Crashed north of Helgoland on 10 May 1918: shot down by Felixstowe F2A flying-boat N4291, flown by Capt T.C. Pattinson and Capt T.H. Munday.	Shot down over the North Sea on 10 May 1918	
LZ 108	V	L 60	18 December 1917	11 reconnaissance missions; one attack on England dropping 3,120 kg of bombs; destroyed together with LZ 99 when seven RNAS Sopwith Camel fighters, launched from the aircraft carrier HMS Furious, bombed the Toska hangar at Tønder, German Empire (Now part of Denmark).	Burned in hangar during Tondern raid on 19 July 1918	
LZ 109	V	L 64	11 March 1918	13 reconnaissance missions over the North Sea; with LZ 108, LZ 106, LZ 107, and LZ 110 raided north of England dropping 2800 kg in bombs. In 1920 transferred to Britain as war reparations. Scrapped at short notice when hangar required for the damaged R36.	Transferred to Britain in 1920 and scrapped	
LZ 110	V	L 63	4 March 1918	Dropped 8,915 kg (19,654 lb) of bombs in three attacks on England, including participation in the last raid on England on 6 August 1918.	Destroyed by its crew on 23 June 1919.	
LZ 111	V	L 65	17 April 1918	Participated in last raid on England on 6 August 1918.	Destroyed by its crew on 23 June 1919.	
LZ 112	X	L 70	1 July 1918	Directed last raid on England on 6 August 1918, with KK Peter Strasser, Commander of the Navy Airship Department on board; intercepted and destroyed over North Sea by British de Havilland DH-4 flown by Major Egbert Cadbury with Captain Robert Leckie (later Air Vice-Marshal) as gunner. These men had already shot down two Zeppelins: prior to L 70, Cadbury had downed L 21 and Leckie, L 22.	Shot down over the North Sea on 6 August 1918	
LZ 113	X	L 71	29 July 1918	Not used in war; in 1920 transferred to Great Britain as war reparations. Scrapped at short notice when hangar required for the damaged R36.	Transferred to Britain in 1920 and scrapped	
LZ 114	X	L 72; Dixmude	9 February 1920	Delivery cancelled when war ended; transferred to France as war reparations on 9 July 1920 and named Dixmude. Made record duration flight of 118 hours. Exploded off the coast of Sicily during a thunderstorm on 21 December 1923 following a lightning strike, killing all aboard.	Transferred to France in 1920. Exploded and crashed off the coast of Sicily during a thunderstorm on 21 December 1923.	
LZ 115	Not realized Ordered in July 1918 as experimental airship L 100; project continued as LZ 119					
LZ 116	Not finished due to end of war, intended as L 73					
LZ 117	Not finished due to end of war, intended as L 74					
LZ 118	Never ordered Planned as L 75 with 68,500 m^{3} (2,419,055 ft^{3}), 226 m (741 ft) long and six engines.					
LZ 119	Not realized Enlarged LZ 115 with 108,000 m^{3} (3,813,984 ft^{3}) and ten engines. Construction planned for June 1919, but cancelled on 6 October 1918.					

September 1917 group photo shows Navy Zeppelin captains: Manger (L 41), von Freudenreich (L 47), Schwonder (L 50), Prölss (L 53), Bockholt (L 57), Peter Strasser (FdL – Führer der Luftschiffe), Gayer (L 49), Stabbert (L 44), Ehrlich (L 35), Dietrich (L 42), Hollender (L 46), Dose (L 51) and Friemel (L 52).

== Zeppelins constructed after World War I ==
Production number	Name	Usage	First flight	Remarks	Image
LZ 120	Bodensee; in Italy: Esperia	civilian; in Italy: military	20 August 1919	Included a first-class passenger section; used by DELAG until 1921, then ordered to be transferred renamed as Esperia (lower image) to Italy as part of war reparations. Arrived in Rome from Staaken on 25 December 1921. Broken up for scrap in July 1928.	
LZ 121	Nordstern; in France: Méditerranée	civilian (intended); in France: experimental	13 June 1921	Intended for regular flights to Stockholm; ordered to be transferred to France as part of war reparations. Decommissioned and disassembled in August 1926. Framework tested to destruction in September 1926 and scrapped.	
LZ 122	not realized				
LZ 123	not realized				
LZ 124	not realized (construction forbidden under the terms of the Treaty of Versailles)				
LZ 125	Project abandoned Projected 236 m (774 ft) long, 29.9 m (98.1 ft) diameter transport airship with 17 gas cells, 12 Maybach Mb IVa engines with 10 propellers to carry 45-50 passengers. Ordered by the US Army on 26 November 1919, but cancelled in December 1919 when the US War Department pulled out due to Major William Hensley negotiating a contract with a company in Germany, which was still at war with the US (the Allied Peace Treaty was not ratified by the US until October 1921).				
LZ 126	ZR-3, USS Los Angeles (in the United States)	experimental, military	27 August 1924	Built as part of war reparations and ordered by the United States; transferred from Friedrichshafen to Lakehurst in 81 hours and 2 minutes, arriving on 15 October 1924, 9:52. Most successful US rigid airship, with just under 4,400 hours of successful flight in US Navy service. Decommissioned in 1932 as an economy measure, but recommissioned after the crash of the USS Akron in 1933. After flying for a few more years, it was retired to its hangar at Lakehurst until 1939 when it was struck off the Navy list and dismantled in its hangar.	
LZ 127	Graf Zeppelin	civilian	18 September 1928	Most successful airship in history; regular flights to North and South America; world tour in 1929, Arctic trip in 1931. Withdrawn from service in 1937 following the Hindenburg disaster and dismantled along with LZ 130 in 1940 upon order of Hermann Göring.	
LZ 128	Project abandoned in favor of LZ 129; The LZ 128 was similar to the LZ 127 Graf Zeppelin, but shorter and wider. Designed as a passenger airship to carry 25 passengers and 10 tons of cargo. For the first time in a zeppelin, the passenger area was to be located in the fuselage. Cancelled in November 1930 due to the crash of the R101, the dangers of hydrogen being made clear.				
LZ 129	Hindenburg (first Hindenburg class airship)	civilian	4 March 1936	Largest airship ever built (along with LZ 130). Intended for filling with helium gas instead of flammable hydrogen, which was, however, refused to be provided to Germany mainly by the US. Regular voyages to North and South America. Destroyed in the Hindenburg disaster on 6 May 1937.	
LZ 130	Graf Zeppelin (second Hindenburg class airship)	civilian	14 September 1938	Total 30 flights (36,550 km, 409 hrs), mainly flight testing but also electronic warfare and radio interception over British coast and Polish/German border. Modified for helium, but none provided by US. Last flight 20 August 1939. Dismantled along with LZ 127 in 1940 upon order of Hermann Göring. Known simply as Graf Zeppelin (no numeral) as the original Graf Zeppelin had been retired.	
LZ 131	not finished Version of the Hindenburg-class airship extended by 18 m (59 ft) to 263 m (863 ft) for around 80 passengers. Construction was interrupted in September 1939 due to the outbreak of WWII; only a few frame rings were constructed before it was scrapped in 1940.				
LZ 132 (I)	not realized Sister ship to LZ 131; would have been very similar to LZ 131. Remained a paper project; designation reused in the 1950s for a concept based on the LZ 131.				
LZ 132 (II)	Project abandoned Projected 265 m (869 ft) long, 41.7 m (136.8 ft) diameter passenger airship based on the LZ 131. Learning lessons from the Hindenburg disaster, the LZ 132 was designed to be inflated with helium. Top speed was 120–147 km/h (75–91 mph) as engines were located inside the hull. Two versions were proposed: a passenger transport for flights to North and South America and a 30-ton cargo freighter. Cancelled in 1957 as being too expensive.				

== See also ==
- List of Parseval airships
- List of Schütte-Lanz airships
- List of airships of the United States Navy
- Rigid airship
