= Zeppelin LZ 25 =

General information
- Type: Rigid airship
- Manufacturer: Luftschiffbau Zeppelin
- Designer: Ferdinand von Zeppelin
- Primary user: Imperial German Army
- Number built: 1

History
- Introduction date: 1914
- First flight: 13 July 1914
- Retired: 1914

Zeppelin LZ 25, with military designation Z IX, was the 25th airship constructed by Count Ferdinand von Zeppelin, and served in the Imperial German Army. It was the twelfth Zeppelin to be commissioned into German military service.

== History ==
LZ 25 made its first flight on 13 July 1914 and was subsequently delivered to the army as Z IX.

At the outbreak of World War I, the Zeppelin was still undergoing test and acceptance flights. On 10 August 1914, it was transferred to Düsseldorf for front-line deployment.

Z IX frequently operated alongside the militarized passenger airship Sachsen, stationed in Cologne. Together, they conducted reconnaissance missions and bombing raids over Antwerp, Calais, Ostend, and Dunkirk.

On 21 August 1914, the German Supreme Army Command issued orders for Z IX to bomb multiple targets, including Antwerp, Zeebrugge, Dunkirk, Calais, and Lille. The airship could easily cover this distance, though it could only carry a maximum bomb load of 1,200 kg—sufficient for ten bombs across the five target locations.

Z IX continued to carry out reconnaissance flights throughout September 1914 in western Belgium and northern France.

To counter the Zeppelin threat, the Allied forces launched bombing missions. On 27 September 1914, an Allied aircraft attempted to destroy Z IX in its hangar in Düsseldorf. In response, machine guns were installed on the rooftops of the airship hangars in Düsseldorf and Cologne to defend against future air raids.

== Destruction ==
On 8 October 1914, a Royal Naval Air Service aircraft surprised the air defenses during a steep dive and successfully dropped two bombs into the Zeppelin’s hangar in Düsseldorf. One mechanic on the roof was killed, but the machine-gunners stationed at the corners of the hangar remained unharmed. The bombs penetrated the roof and ignited the hydrogen inside the Zeppelin, setting it ablaze. The airship's own bombs, which had not yet been armed, fell to the ground without exploding after the heat melted their suspension hardware. The Zeppelin was completely destroyed, though its externally mounted engines survived. The hangar itself remained largely intact, apart from the hole in the roof.

== Specifications ==
- Gas volume: 22,500 m³ of hydrogen
- Length: 158.0 m
- Diameter: 14.9 m
- Payload: 9.2 t
- Engines: 3 × Maybach engines, 210 hp (160 kW) each
- Top speed: 22.5 m/s (81 km/h)

== See also ==
- List of Zeppelins
