= Zeppelin LZ 40 =

L 10

General information
- Type: Zeppelin Type P
- National origin: German Empire
- Manufacturer: Luftschiffbau Zeppelin

Zeppelin LZ 40, with military designation L 10, was the 40th airship built by Count Zeppelin and the tenth Zeppelin operated by the Imperial German Navy.

== History ==
LZ 40 was the first Zeppelin to be equipped with four engines, instead of the usual three. It belonged to the Type P class, of which 21 were built starting with LZ 38—ten were delivered to the Army and eleven to the Navy. It was the first naval airship with a lifting gas volume of over 30,000 m³ of hydrogen. Measuring 163.5 m in length, it was 2 m longer than L 9 of the interim Type O and 5.5 m longer than the first standard Type M Zeppelins. The diameter increased from 14.9 to 18.7 m.

The maiden flight of LZ 40 took place on 13 May 1915. The Navy commissioned it as L 10, under the command of Kapitänleutnant Claus Hirsch (b. 1885). It was stationed at Nordholz Airbase for reconnaissance missions over the North Sea and bombing raids on Great Britain.

On its first bombing raid over London, L 10 took off from Nordholz shortly after midnight on 4 June 1915. Its bomb load consisted of two 100 kg bombs, twenty 50 kg high-explosive bombs, and 90 incendiary bombs. Due to strong headwinds, it failed to reach London before dawn and instead dropped its bombs on Gravesend.

On 16 June 1915, L 10 bombed the industrial area on the River Tyne, dropping 2.5 tons of bombs and causing significant damage to factories. During this attack, the airship escaped a pursuing British aircraft by climbing to a high altitude that the enemy plane could not reach.

Subsequent attacks were made on Sheppey and Harwich. Its final raid over England occurred on 17 August 1915, dropping 1.4 tons of bombs on London.

== Destruction of LZ 40 / L 10 ==
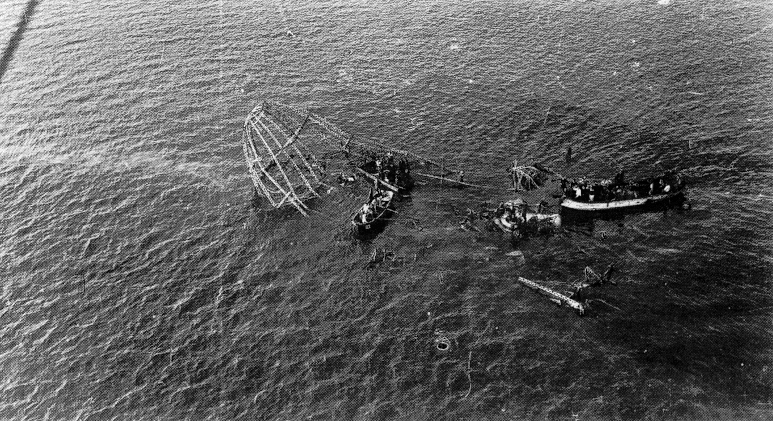
Recovery attempts of L 10 wreckage

On 3 September 1915, during a thunderstorm near Cuxhaven, escaping gas ignited, and the airship burned in mid-air. There were no survivors. All 19 crew members perished and were buried at the Ritzebüttel cemetery in Cuxhaven.

A similar storm flight over the North Sea was described by Hans von Schiller, an officer aboard L 11:

Lightning flashes in wide sheets. A deafening crash stuns my ears and fills the airship with blinding light; a bolt strikes the sea right next to the Zeppelin. The lookout calls down that his machine gun barrels are sparking. I climb up to see what's going on. To my surprise, I find the platform brightly illuminated. Sitting there, drenched to the skin, is the lookout with a literal halo around his head. This phenomenon, known to mountaineers and sailors alike, is called St. Elmo's fire. The duralumin frame of the envelope is electrified, sparking at all joints and edges. Looking up from the control gondola, we can see electricity discharging from every projecting surface. Wires and cables glow with a violet-blue hue—an impressive sight, though hardly comforting. Our men stagger like drunken tightrope walkers along the narrow walkway, and all our lives depend on no hydrogen escaping while lightning bolts flash by every two seconds.

== Specifications ==
- Lifting gas volume: 31,900 m³ of hydrogen
- Length: 163.5 m
- Diameter: 18.7 m
- Payload: 15 t
- Propulsion: Four six-cylinder Maybach engines, each with 210 kW
- Maximum speed: 26.7 m/s

== See also ==
- List of Zeppelins
