= Zeppelin LZ 89 =

R-class zeppelin of the Imperial German Navy

LZ 89 (L 50)
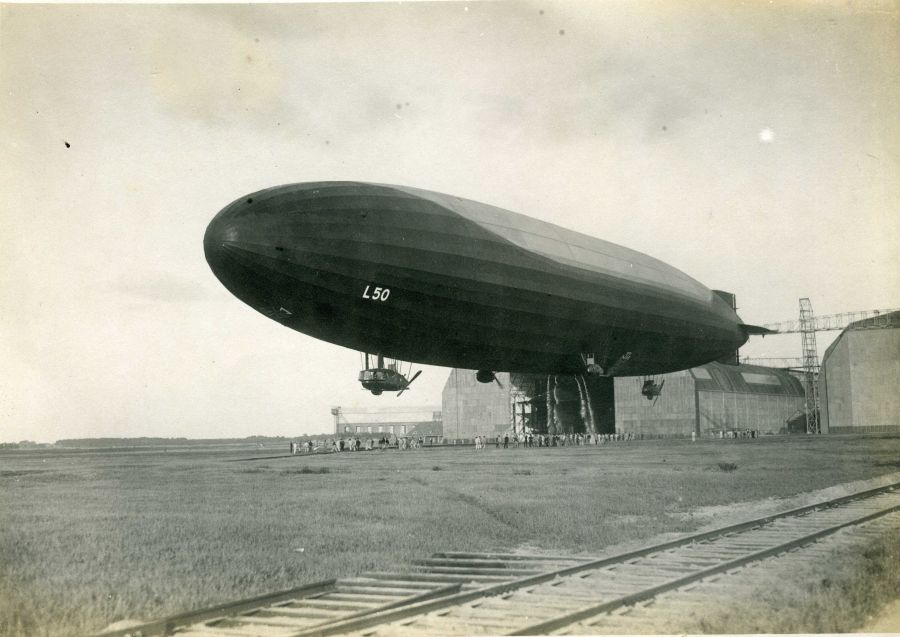
- L 50 (LZ 89) in 1917

General information
- Type: Bomber and patrol airship
- National origin: Germany

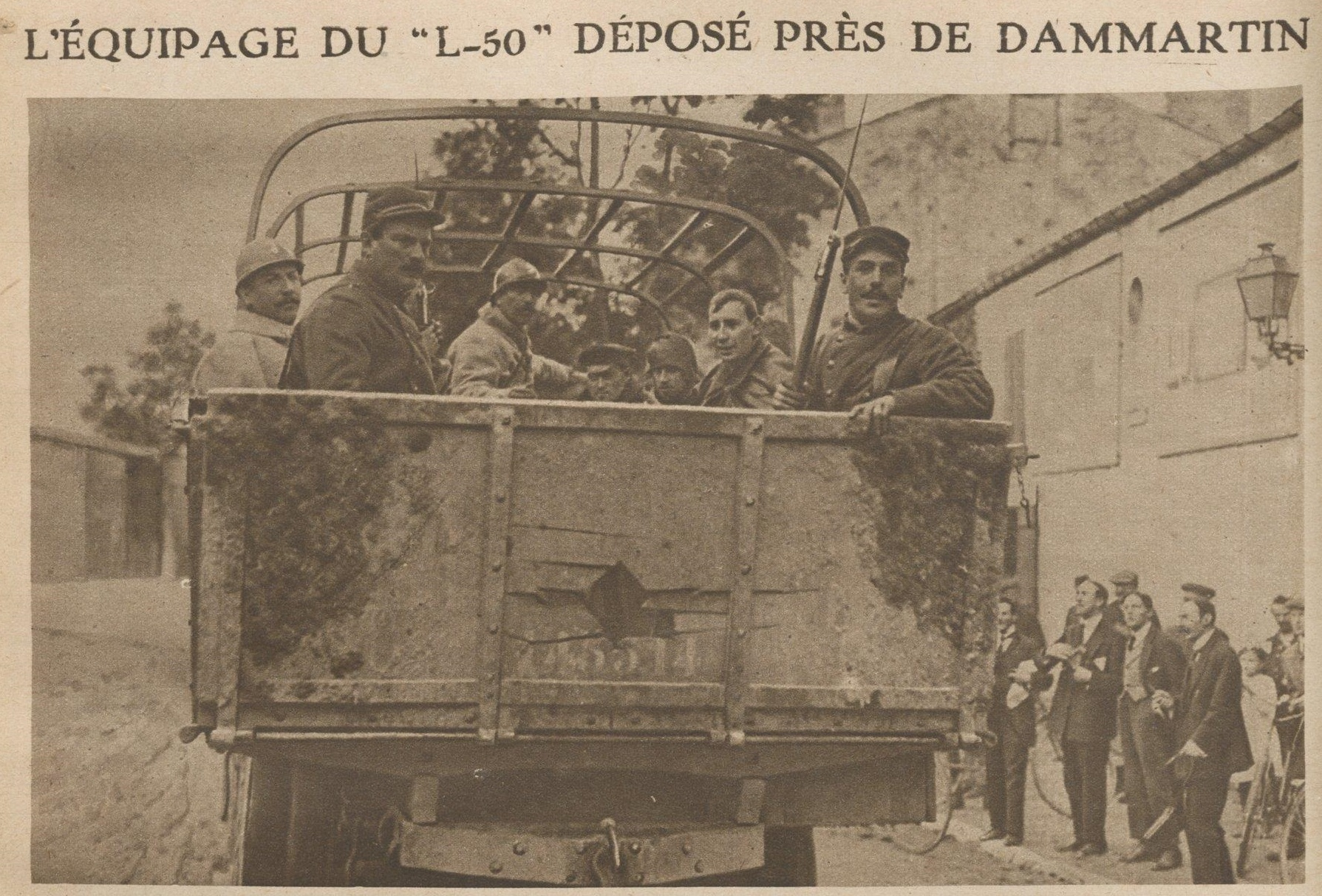
Two officers and 14 crewmen of Zeppelin LZ 89 (L 50) were captured and taken to Bourbonne-les-Bains

Zeppelin LZ 89 (L 50) was an R-class zeppelin of the Imperial German Navy. After a short career during the World War I it ran out of fuel during a mission and was deliberately crashed.

== Service ==
Airship LZ 89 took part in five missions around the North Sea. In addition to the naval scouting missions, it participated in two attacks on the United Kingdom, dropping a total of 4,135 kg (9,116 lb) of bombs on English targets.

On 20 October 1917 LZ 89 was returning from bombing Norwich when it ran out of fuel. To prevent capture the commander ordered the Zeppelin to do a controlled crash near Dammartin-sur-Meuse where the Zeppelin would be destroyed but allow the crew to safely get off the ship. The airship crashed but after the control car had been torn off the ship drifted off over the Mediterranean with five crew members still on board. They were never seen again. Two officers and 14 crewmen of Zeppelin LZ 89 (L 50) were captured and taken prisoners-of-war to Bourbonne-les-Bains.

== Specifications (LZ 89 / Type r zeppelin) ==
Data from Zeppelin : rigid airships, 1893-1940

General characteristics

- Crew: 17-19
- Capacity: 32,400 kg (71,430 lb) typical disposable load
- Length: 198 m (649 ft 7 in)
- Diameter: 23.9 m (78 ft 5 in) maximum
- Fineness ratio: 8.24
- Volume: 55,200 m^{3} (1,950,000 cu ft) in 19 gas cells
- Empty weight: 31,400 kg (69,225 lb)
- Gross weight: 32,908 kg (72,550 lb)
- Fuel capacity: 6,250 kg (13,779 lb)
- Useful lift: 63,800 kg (140,700 lb)
- Powerplant: 5 × Maybach HS Lu 6-cylinder water-cooled in-line piston engines, 180 kW (240 hp) each
- Propellers: 4-bladed Lorenzen fixed-pitch propellers

Performance

- Maximum speed: 103 km/h (64 mph, 56 kn)
- Cruise speed: 81 km/h (50 mph, 44 kn)
- Range: 7,400 km (4,600 mi, 4,000 nmi) at 81 km/h (50 mph; 44 kn)
- Service ceiling: 3,900 m (12,800 ft) static
- Rate of climb: 10 m/s (2,000 ft/min) maximum permitted (r-class)

Armament

- Guns: machine-guns in hull-top positions and gondolas
- Bombs: up to 60 bombs to a total of 5,000 kg (11,023 lb)

== See also ==
- List of Zeppelins

== Bibliography ==
Notes

References

- "Zeppelin LZ 89". Le Miroir. Paris. 1917. ISSN 0996-293X.
- Robinson, Douglas Hill (1971). The Zeppelin in Combat: A History of the German Naval Airship Division, 1912-1918. Foulis. ISBN 9780854291304.
