= Zeppelin LZ 22 =

1914 Zeppelin L-class airship

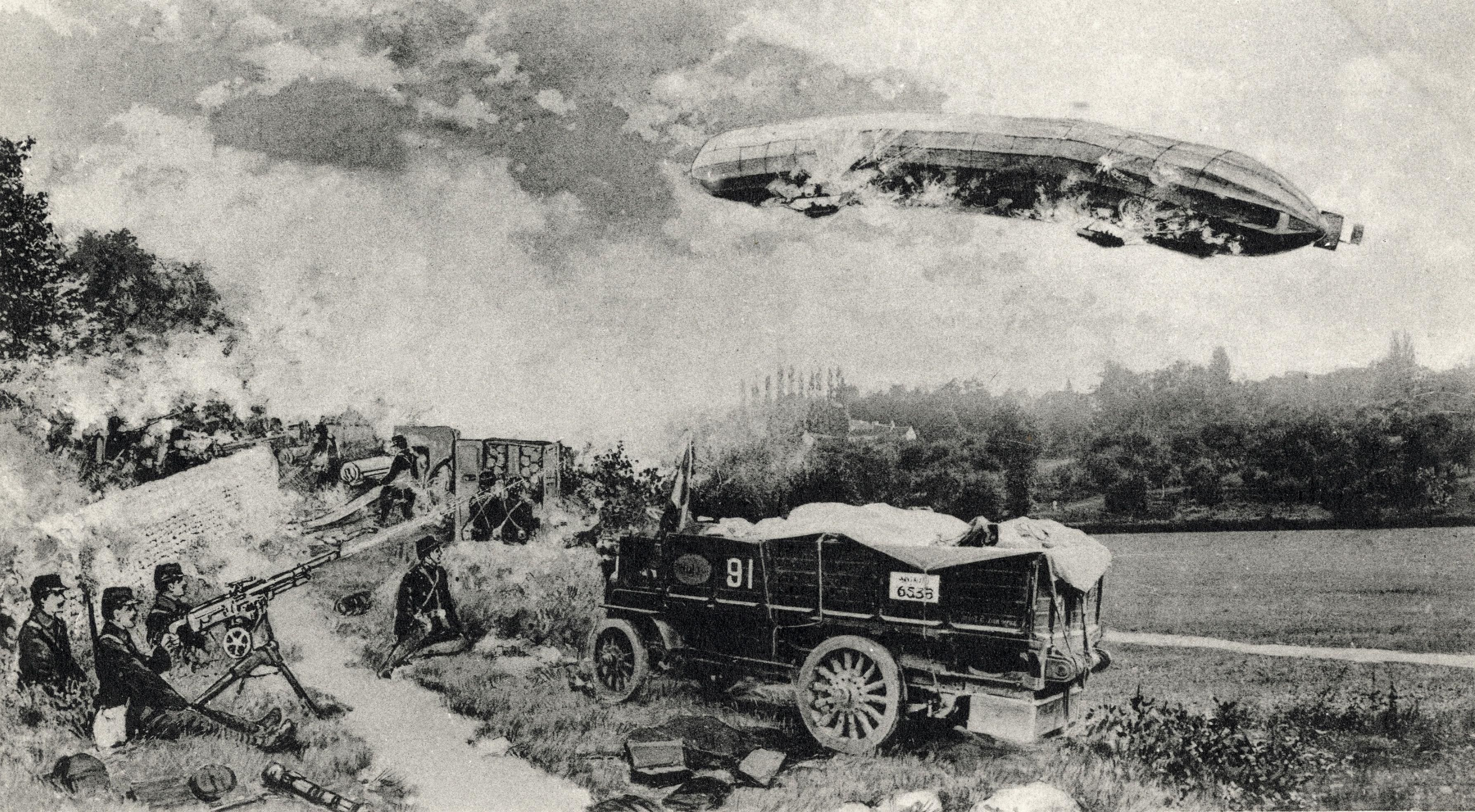
Zeppelin LZ 22 is shot down by French troops near Badonviller in the Vosges during a reconnaissance mission, on August 28, 1914

Zeppelin LZ 22, with tactical number ZVII, was the 22nd airship built by Count Zeppelin and the tenth airship operated by the German Army.

== History ==
The first flight of LZ 22 took place on 8 January 1914. The military designation of the airship was Z VII.

At the outbreak of World War I in early August 1914, Z VII was stationed at Baden-Oos Airfield. On 21 August 1914, Z VII was ordered to scout the positions of French forces that had crossed the Imperial border into Alsace, and to carry out attacks against them. The reconnaissance mission over the wooded Vosges mountains required low-altitude flying, and due to the airship's limited ceiling of 1,500 meters in terrain nearly 1,000 meters high, it could not escape enemy fire by ascending. As a result, French infantry using carbines were able to puncture the airship's envelope in numerous places. After dropping its 500 kg payload of munitions, the Zeppelin turned back toward its home base in Baden-Oos. However, the gas loss was so severe that it had to make an emergency landing near Saint-Quirin. The airship was so heavily damaged that it was subsequently dismantled.

== Specifications ==
- Lifting gas volume: 22,100 m³ of hydrogen
- Length: 156.0 m
- Diameter: 14.90 m
- Payload: 8.8 t
- Propulsion: Three Maybach engines, each producing 180PS
- Speed: 20.0 m/s (72 km/h)

== See also ==
- List of Zeppelins
