= Zeppelin LZ 39 =

LZ 39
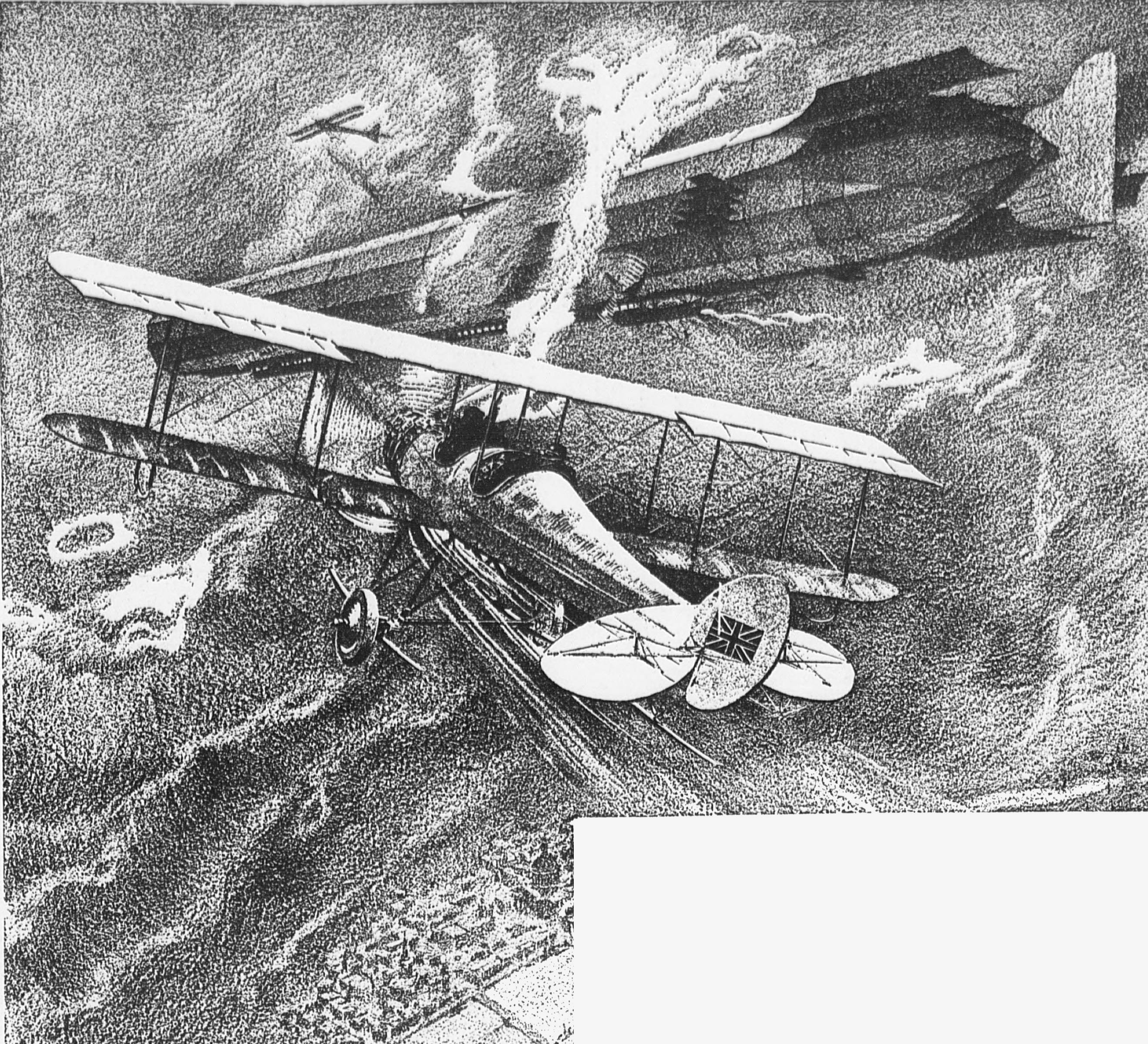
- Imperial German Army Zeppelin LZ 39 under attack. Picture from the 17 May 1915, Night time edition of the Evening Public Ledger (Note: Three Zeppelins were spotted 03:15 on 17 May 1915 with the attack happening after that. Then the British military reported it, sent it out on wire services. The time difference between London and Philadelphia is 5 hrs. The Evening Public Ledger got it on the morning 17 May 1915 commissioned the artist to draw the image who then had it ready for the 17 May 1915 Night Time edition.)

General information
- Type: O-class reconnaissance-bomber rigid airship
- National origin: German Empire
- Manufacturer: Luftschiffbau Zeppelin
- Designer: Ludwig Dürr
- Primary user: Imperial German Navy
- Number built: 1

History
- First flight: 24 April 1915

The Imperial German Army Zeppelin LZ 39 was an O-class World War I Zeppelin.

== Operational history ==
Extensively damaged on 17 May 1915 by Flt Commander Bigsworth. Three raids on the western and two on the eastern front, dropping 4,184 kg (9,224 lb) of bombs.

== Bigsworth bombing ==
Flight Commander Arthur Bigsworth had already experimented with night flying, using two 4 V lamps attached to his aircraft and no doubt called on this experience on 17 May 1915, when he managed to climb his Avro 504 above LZ 39 over Ostend and drop four 20 lb (9 kg) bombs on its envelope, causing considerable damage. LZ 39 managed to return to its base, despite damage to five of its gasbags. For this feat Bigsworth was awarded the Distinguished Service Order (DSO). This was the first night-time attack on a Zeppelin. The attack and damage to the Zeppelin was reported on in the American press the same day it happened, 17 May 1915.

== Last mission ==
On 17 December 1915, captained by Dr. Lempertz, LZ 39 was hit by shrapnel during an attack on Rovno. All rear gas cells were punctured and the front engine car was hit and later fell off. The crew abandoned the now-overstressed control cabin, dropped ballast and shifted loads to rebalance the ship and used an emergency control station in the rear to limp back to Germany. After the forced landing the ship collapsed because the material for repair and the supply of gas needed to refill the cells were not available.

== Specifications (LZ 39) ==
Data from Zeppelin : rigid airships 1893-1940

General characteristics

- Crew: 16
- Capacity: 11,100 kg (24,471 lb) typical disposable load
- Length: 161.40 m (529 ft 6 in)
- Diameter: 16 m (52 ft 6 in)
- Fineness ratio: 10.09
- Volume: 24,900 m^{3} (880,000 cu ft) in 15 gas cells
- Empty weight: 17,800 kg (39,242 lb)
- Useful lift: 28,900 kg (63,700 lb)
- Powerplant: 3 × Maybach CX engines 6-cylinder water-cooled in-line piston engines, 130 kW (180 hp) each
- Propellers: 2-bladed fixed-pitch propellers

Performance

- Maximum speed: 85 km/h (53 mph, 46 kn)
- Range: 3,300 km (2,100 mi, 1,800 nmi) maximum

== See also ==
- List of Zeppelins
