= Zeppelin LZ 49 =

LZ 49 (tactical number LZ 79)
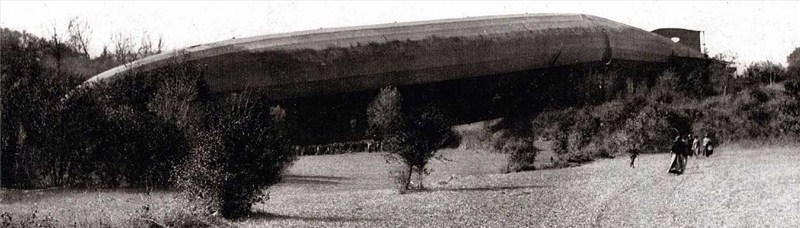
- Wreckage of Zeppelin LZ 49 (LZ 79)

General information
- Type: P-class reconnaissance-bomber rigid airship
- National origin: German Empire
- Manufacturer: Luftschiffbau Zeppelin
- Designer: Ludwig Dürr
- Primary user: Imperial German Navy

History
- First flight: 2 August 1915
- Retired: 30 January 1916 (crashed in Belgium after being damaged by French anti-aircraft fire)

The Zeppelin LZ 49, tactical number LZ 79, was the 49th airship built by Count Ferdinand von Zeppelin and the 23rd commissioned by the Imperial German Army. It belonged to the "P-class" series of German military Zeppelins.

== History ==
The airship was constructed in Potsdam and undertook its maiden flight on 2 August 1915. It was first stationed in Jüterbog, then moved on 6 August 1915 to Posen, and from 11 September 1915 to Maubeuge and Düren. Later, it was alternately stationed in Spich and Namur. During its first landing attempt in Posen, an accident occurred when several ground crew members were lifted off the ground by a mooring line. One person fell to their death, while two others were rescued after two hours. Under the command of Captain Victor Gaissert, LZ 79 carried out three bombing missions, dropping a total of 4,440 kg of bombs. The first bombing raid took place during the night of 10–11 August 1915 against Brest-Litovsk and Kovel, covering 1,350 km in 17 hours and dropping 1,500 kg of bombs. The second attack, on 25–26 August 1915, again targeted Brest-Litovsk, where 1,100 kg of bombs were dropped over a railway station.

In October 1915, LZ 79 underwent repairs at the airship hangar in Distelrath (Düren), where it suffered significant damage while being rolled out. Repairs were completed on site by December 1915. During this time, the airship was upgraded with additional gas cells and a radio direction-finding system for navigation.

It was then relocated to Namur in Belgium. From there, an attempted bombing mission to Le Creusot on 25–26 January 1916 was unsuccessful.

=== Fate ===
The airship was one of several P-class Zeppelins lost to enemy action. During a raid on Paris on 30 January 1916, LZ 79 was hit several times by anti-aircraft fire from French defenses. Although it managed to continue flying for a time, it lost altitude and eventually crashed into a building in darkness near Mainvault, close to Ath, Belgium. The damage was severe enough that the Zeppelin was dismantled.

== Specifications ==
- Lifting gas volume:
  - 31,900 m³ hydrogen (until October 1915)
  - 35,800 m³ hydrogen (from December 1915)
- Length:
  - 163.50 m (until October 1915)
  - 178.50 m (from December 1915)
- Diameter: 18.70 m
- Payload: 16.2 t
- Propulsion: Four six-cylinder Maybach engines, each producing 210 kW
- Speed: 26.7 m/s
- Range: 2,150 km
- Maximum altitude: 3,900 m
- Armament: 2 × 8 mm Maxim machine guns
- Crew: approx. 18 men

== See also ==
- List of Zeppelins
