= Zeppelin LZ 29 =

LZ 29 (Z X)
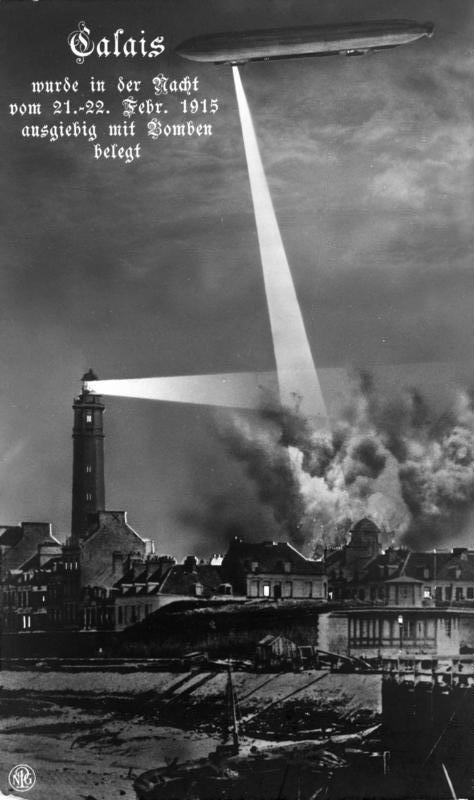
- Imperial German Zeppelin LZ 29 (Z X) bombed Calais, France on the night of 21 February 1915

General information
- Type: M-class reconnaissance-bomber rigid airship
- National origin: German Empire
- Manufacturer: Luftschiffbau Zeppelin
- Designer: Ludwig Dürr
- Primary user: Imperial German Navy
- Number built: 1

History
- First flight: 13 October 1914
- Retired: Crashed in St. Quentin, France, 21 March 1915

The Imperial German Navy Zeppelin LZ 29 (Z X) was an M-class World War I Zeppelin.

== Operational history ==
The airship participated in two attacks on Calais and Paris, dropping 1,800 kg (4,000 lb) of bombs. While returning from the 21 March 1915 raid Z X was damaged by enemy fire and crashed after a forced landing at Saint-Quentin. It was dismantled on ground after the crash.

== Specifications (LZ 31 / M2-class zeppelin) ==
Data from Zeppelin : rigid airships, 1893-1940, The Zeppelin Airships - Part Two: Zeppelins of the Great War 1914–1918

General characteristics

- Crew: 16
- Capacity: 9,200 kg (20,283 lb) typical disposable load
- Length: 158 m (518 ft 4 in)
- Diameter: 14.9 m (48 ft 11 in) maximum
- Fineness ratio: 10.61
- Volume: 22,470 m^{3} (794,000 cu ft) in 18 gas cells
- Empty weight: 16,900 kg (37,258 lb)
- Fuel capacity: 4,000 kg (8,818 lb) maximum
- Useful lift: 26,100 kg (57,500 lb)
- Powerplant: 3 × Maybach C-X 6-cylinder water-cooled in-line piston engines, 130 kW (180 hp) each
- Propellers: 2-bladed fixed-pitch propellers

Performance

- Maximum speed: 84 km/h (52 mph, 45 kn)
- Cruise speed: 80.5 km/h (50.0 mph, 43.5 kn)
- Range: 2,200 km (1,400 mi, 1,200 nmi)
- Service ceiling: 2,800 m (9,200 ft) static

Armament

- Guns: 4x machine-guns

== See also ==
- List of Zeppelins
