= Zeppelin LZ 102 =

LZ 102 (L 57)
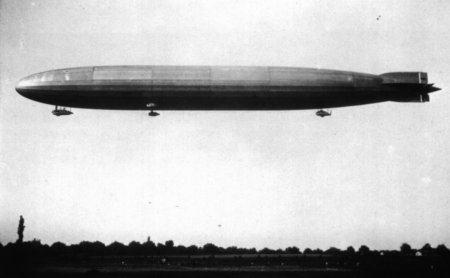
- LZ 102 (L 57) in 1917

General information
- Type: Transport airship, later refitted for bombing
- Manufacturer: Luftschiffbau Zeppelin, Staaken
- Owners: Imperial German Navy

History
- First flight: 26 September 1917
- Fate: 8 October 1917 destroyed by heavy winds

Zeppelin LZ 102 (designated L 57) was an airship of the German Imperial Navy. It was planned that it would attempt a mission to Africa but it was destroyed and its sister ship LZ 104 (L 59), nicknamed Das Afrika-Schiff ("The Africa Ship"), made a famous attempt at a long-distance resupply mission to the beleaguered garrison of Germany's East Africa colony.

== Modifications ==
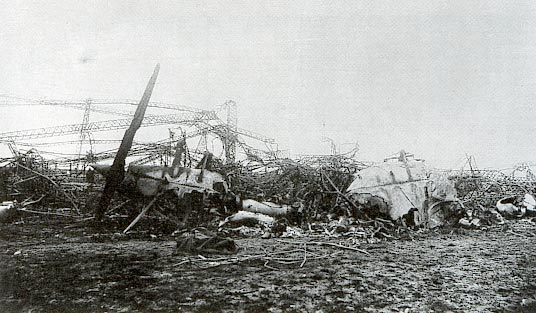
The wreck of L 57, 1917

The Imperial German Naval office in hopes of outfitting a ship that could fly to Africa had LZ 102 cut in half and added two more segments - 30 metres (98 ft) in length. The gas in these extra two segments increased the Airship's gas volume by 13,300 m^{3} (470,000 ft^{3}). This additional volume was more than the entire volume of the early Zeppelin LZ 3. It was designed to reach an altitude of about 7,620 m (25,000 ft).

== History ==
The first flight of the new airship took place on 26 September 1917 at the Friedrichshafen base.

=== Destruction ===
The flight to Africa would only be in one direction; the airship would not be able to return to Germany due to losses of the hydrogen lifting gas during the flight. The Imperial German Naval command selected the relatively inexperienced Kapitänleutnant Ludwig Bockholt as they did not want to lose an experienced commander.

According to Bockholt, LZ 102 (L 57) was difficult to control and had insufficient engine power but it was decided that despite this it would be sent on the Africa mission. After two additional test flights, the L.57 flew to the base in Jüterbog where cargo intended for Africa was loaded on its deck, including 85 boxes with various types of medical supplies. Loading was completed at noon on 6 October.

During previous flights, no tests had been carried out with full engine power and it was only after loading the cargo that Bockholt decided to carry out tests the same evening. Despite the rising wind, Bockholt ordered the airship to be removed from the hangar, which almost always ended in disaster due to strong gusts of wind. Bockholt decided to wait out the impending storm in the air, but he delayed the start waiting for food and warm clothes to be delivered aboard the airship. Just before midnight, a strong gust of wind hit the airship, damaging it. About 40 minutes after midnight, the wind decreased sufficiently that it was decided that it would be possible to place the airship back into the hangar. However, just in front of the hangar door, the airship suddenly rose 20 m (66 ft) into the air and a strong gust of wind began to pull it across the field despite efforts of the ground handlers. Bockholt released gas from the airship's gas chambers and ordered the soldiers to shoot holes in some of the chambers to speed up the dumping of the gas. Despite all efforts, the wind took again the damaged airship, which caught fire about two o'clock. Loaded with fuel and ammunition, the fire burned until the morning and the valuable medical supplies burned on board the aircraft.

== Specifications (LZ 102 / Type W zeppelin) ==
Data from Zeppelin : rigid airships, 1893-1940

General characteristics

- Crew: 22
- Capacity: 52,100 kg (114,861 lb) typical disposable load
- Length: 226.50 m (743 ft 1 in)
- Diameter: 23.90 m (78 ft 5 in)
- Fineness ratio: 9.52
- Volume: 68,470 m^{3} (2,418,000 cu ft) in 16 gas cells
- Empty weight: 27,400 kg (60,407 lb)
- Fuel capacity: 21,700 kg (47,840 lb) maximum fuel load
- Useful lift: 79,500 kg (175,300 lb)
- Powerplant: 5 × Maybach HS Lu 6-cylinder water-cooled in-line piston engines

Performance

- Maximum speed: 103 km/h (64 mph, 56 kn)
- Cruise speed: 81 km/h (50 mph, 44 kn)
- Range: 16,000 km (9,900 mi, 8,600 nmi)
- Service ceiling: 6,600 m (21,700 ft) static

== See also ==
- List of Zeppelins
