= Zeppelin LZ 86 =

Zeppelin LZ 80 / L 35 - Imperial German Army Airship

LZ 86 / L 39
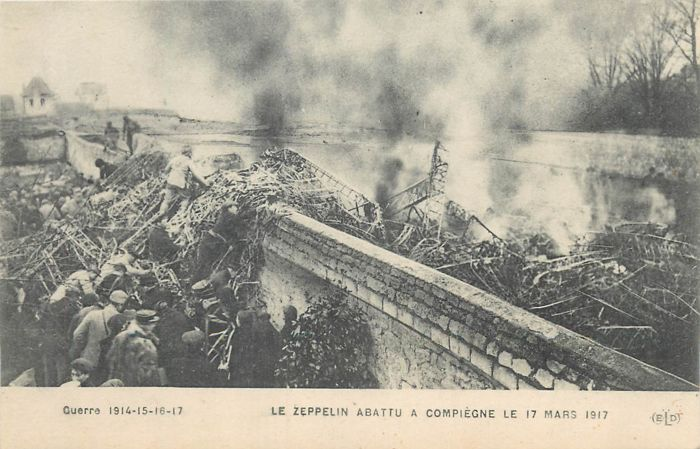
- The wreckage of Imperial German Navy Zeppelin LZ 86 (L 39) after being shot down on March 17 1917

General information
- Type: R-class reconnaissance-bomber rigid airship
- National origin: German Empire
- Manufacturer: Luftschiffbau Zeppelin
- Designer: Ludwig Dürr
- Primary user: Imperial German Army
- Number built: 1

History
- First flight: 11 December 1916
- Retired: Decommissioned in September 1918.

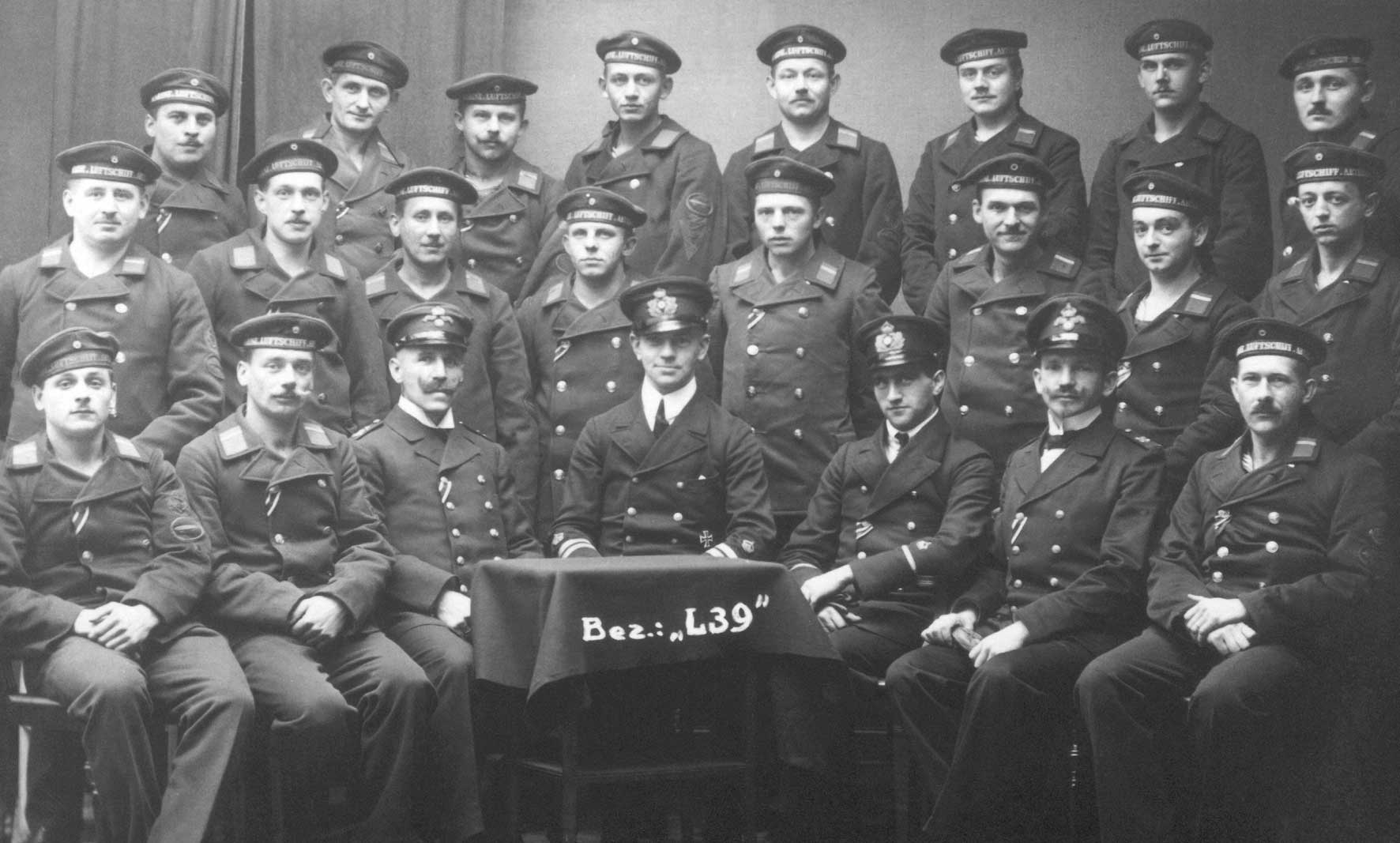
L 39's crew with Robert Koch in the middle

The Imperial German Navy Zeppelin LZ 86 (L-39) was a R-class World War I zeppelin.

== Operational history ==
Two reconnaissance missions around the North Sea; one attack on England dropping 300 kg bombs.

== Destruction ==
Returning to Imperial German airspace the airship was destroyed by French flak near Compiègne on 17 March 1917.

== Specifications (LZ 80 / Type R zeppelin) ==
Data from Zeppelin : rigid airships, 1893–1940

General characteristics

- Crew: 17-19
- Capacity: 32,400 kg (71,430 lb) typical disposable load
- Length: 198 m (649 ft 7 in)
- Diameter: 23.9 m (78 ft 5 in) maximum
- Fineness ratio: 8.24
- Volume: 55,200 m^{3} (1,950,000 cu ft) in 19 gas cells
- Empty weight: 31,400 kg (69,225 lb)
- Gross weight: 32,908 kg (72,550 lb)
- Fuel capacity: 6,250 kg (13,779 lb)
- Useful lift: 63,800 kg (140,700 lb)
- Powerplant: 5 × Maybach HS Lu 6-cylinder water-cooled in-line piston engines, 180 kW (240 hp) each
- Propellers: 4-bladed Lorenzen fixed-pitch propellers

Performance

- Maximum speed: 103 km/h (64 mph, 56 kn)
- Cruise speed: 81 km/h (50 mph, 44 kn)
- Range: 7,400 km (4,600 mi, 4,000 nmi) at 81 km/h (50 mph; 44 kn)
- Service ceiling: 3,900 m (12,800 ft) static
- Rate of climb: 10 m/s (2,000 ft/min) maximum permitted (r-class)

Armament

- Guns: machine-guns in hull-top positions and gondolas
- Bombs: up to 60 bombs to a total of 5,000 kg (11,023 lb)

== See also ==
- List of Zeppelins

== Bibliography ==
Notes

References

- Brooks, Peter W. (1992). Zeppelin : rigid airships, 1893–1940. Washington, D.C.: Smithsonian Institution Press. pp. 95–99. ISBN 9781560982289.
- Robinson, Douglas Hill (1971). The Zeppelin in Combat: A History of the German Naval Airship Division, 1912-1918. Foulis. ISBN 9780854291304. - Total pages: 417
