= Zeppelin LZ 30 =

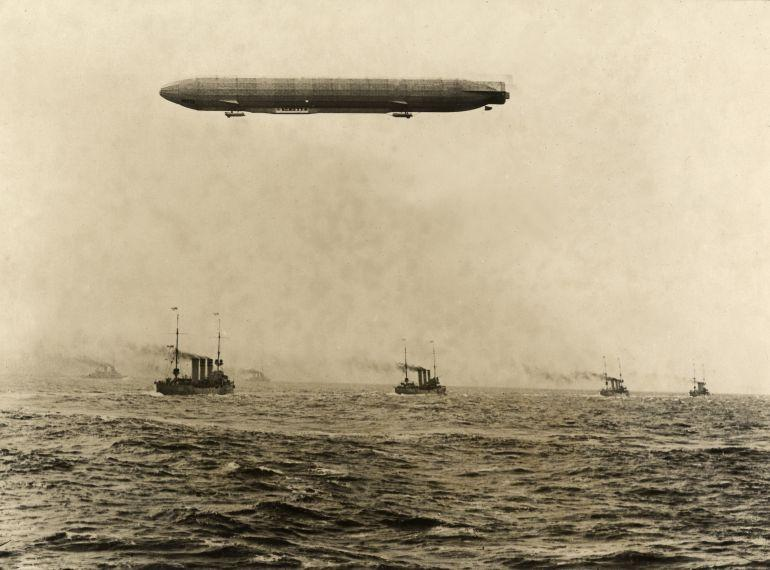
Zeppelin LZ 30 Hansa during fleet manoeuvres in the North Sea shortly before World War I. Military designation: Z XI

LZ 30 was the 30th airship built by Count Ferdinand von Zeppelin and the 14th operated by the Imperial German Army. It served under the military designation Z XI from November 1914 to May 1915.

== History ==
The maiden flight of LZ 30 took place on 15 November 1914. The Army took delivery of the airship under the designation Z XI.

Z XI was stationed in Poznań for wartime operations. From there, it conducted bombing raids on cities including Warsaw, Grodno, and Kaunas.

=== Fate ===
On 20 May 1915, Z XI was damaged while being moved out of its airship hangar in Poznań and was driven off by adverse winds. During its descent, the airship caught fire and was destroyed.

=== Legacy ===
The gondola is preserved at the Royal Museum of the Armed Forces and Military History in Brussels, and is currently on loan to the Zeppelin Museum in Friedrichshafen.

== Specifications ==
- Gas volume: 22,500 m³ hydrogen
- Length: 158.0 m
- Diameter: 14.90 m
- Payload: 9.2 t
- Propulsion: Three Maybach engines, each with 210Ps
- Speed: 22.5 m/s (81 km/h)

== See also ==
- List of Zeppelins
