= Zeppelin LZ 21 =

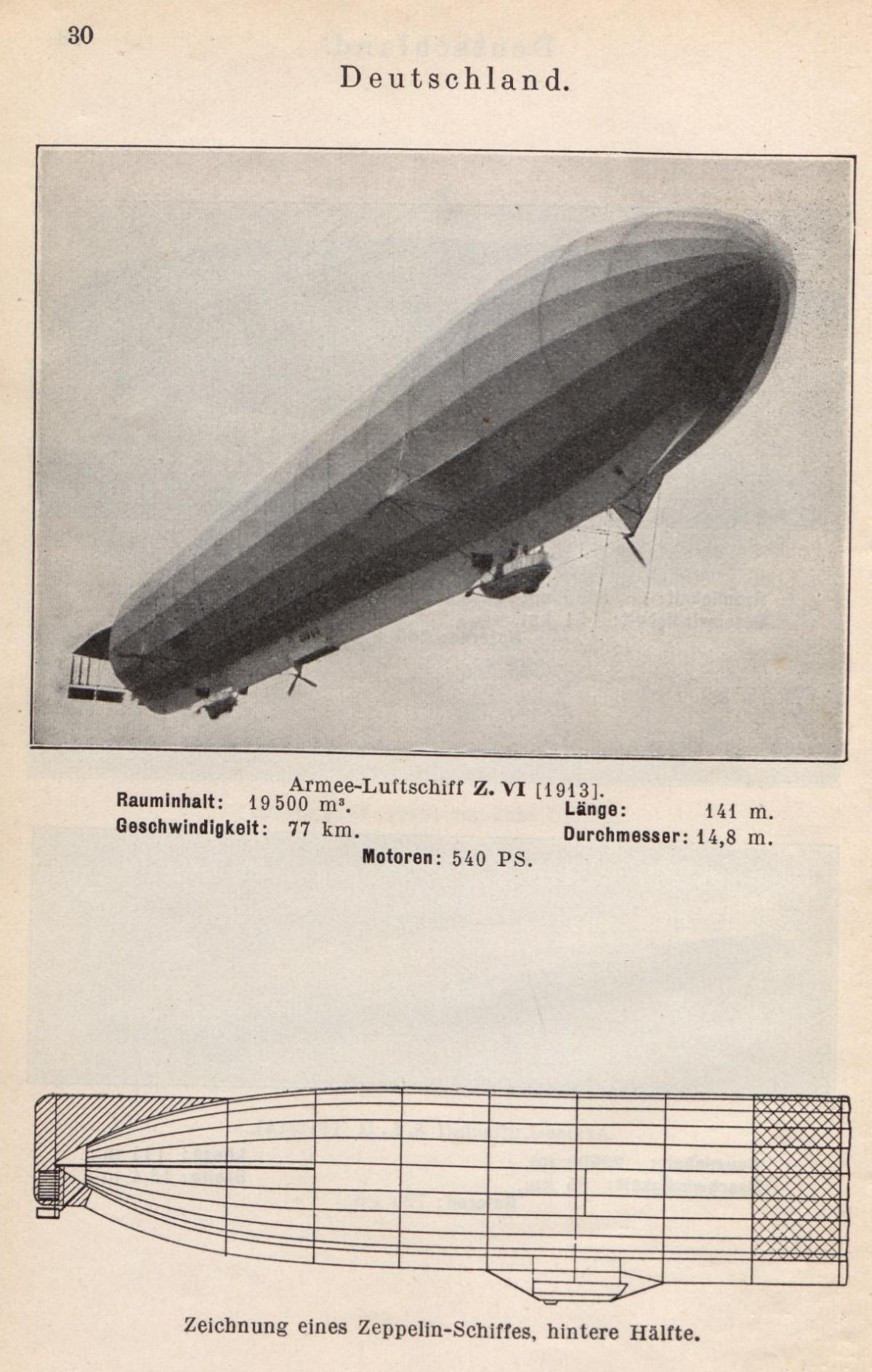
LZ 21 / Z VI

Zeppelin LZ 21 was the 21st airship built by Count Zeppelin and the ninth Zeppelin used by the Imperial German Army. It carried the military designation Z VI.

== History ==
LZ 21 made its first flight on 10 November 1913. It was assigned the military designation Z VI.

At the outbreak of World War I in early August 1914, Z VI was stationed in Cologne at the airship base that later became Cologne Butzweilerhof Airport. During the Battle of Liège, Z VI conducted a nighttime bombing raid on the forts surrounding the city on 6 August. This operation is believed to have been the first aerial bombing attack of World War I.

On 5 August 1914 at 10:00 p.m., the Zeppelin took off from Cologne carrying 200 kg of explosives. The bombing occurred at 3:00 a.m. on 6 August, killing nine civilians. Hit by several shrapnel fragments from anti-aircraft fire, the airship suffered severe gas loss and was forced to make an emergency landing in a forest near Bonn. Due to the extent of the damage, Z VI was dismantled on site.

== Technical data ==
- Lifting gas volume: 20,900 m³ (hydrogen)
- Length: 148.0 m
- Diameter: 16.60 m
- Payload: 8.8 t
- Propulsion: Three Maybach engines, each producing 180 hp
- Maximum speed: 21.0 m/s (75.6 km/h)

== See also ==
- List of Zeppelins
