= Zeppelin LZ 46 =

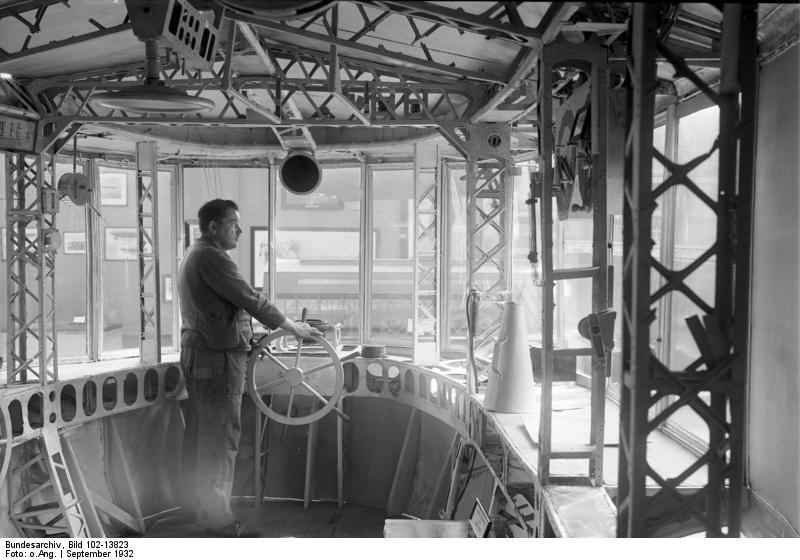
Original gondola of L14 at the Aviation Museum Berlin-Johannisthal

The Zeppelin LZ 46 was the 46th airship built by Count Zeppelin and the fourteenth operated by the Imperial German Navy (tactical number L 14). It belonged to the Zeppelin P Class.

== History ==
L14 is considered the most successful naval airship. It conducted 17 bombing raids on England and 42 reconnaissance missions. L14 dropped a total of 22,045 kg of bombs on targets in England. Its primary bases of operation were Nordholz and Hage.

Along with its sister ships L11, L13, and L16, the ships of this class were among the most successful airships from a military standpoint. Together, these four airships carried out 162 reconnaissance missions and 56 attacks, delivering 17% of the total bombs dropped by airships during the war (approximately 75 tonnes). Overall, airships of the P-class accounted for 38% of the total tonnage dropped by airships during the First World War. Only the first two ships of the newer R-class achieved similar success.

L14 conducted its first bombing mission on 17 August 1915. During a squadron raid on the night of 8–9 September 1915 (see L13) targeting London, L14 missed its target and instead dropped its bombs on Norwich. Other targets included Derby, Hull, Thameshaven, and London again. L14 also flew over the Firth of Forth twice in attempts to attack the British fleet.

== Fate ==
Once the airship was outdated, LZ 46 / L14 was decommissioned and stored in its hangar in Nordholz. On 23 June 1919, two days after the scuttling of the German High Seas Fleet, the crew destroyed L14 by breaking its suspension equipment.

== Technical data ==
- Lifting gas volume: 31,900 m^{3} of hydrogen
- Length: 163.00 m
- Diameter: 18.70 m
- Payload: 16.2 tonnes
- Propulsion: Four Maybach engines, each producing 210 PS
- Speed: 26.7 m/s

== Legacy ==
In the 1930s the original gondola of L14 is displayed at the Aviation Museum Berlin-Johannisthal. Apart from that the Westphalia Aviation Industry Collection had items of the LZ46 in its collection.

== See also ==
- List of Zeppelins
