= Zeppelin LZ 51 =

The Zeppelin LZ 51, with the tactical designation LZ 81, was the 51st airship built by Count Ferdinand von Zeppelin and the 24th used by the Imperial German Army. It belonged to the "P" class of German military Zeppelins.

== History ==
The airship was constructed in Löwental and made its maiden flight on 7 October 1915. Its operational bases included Szentandras (from 2 November 1915 to 19 January 1916 and again in summer 1916 until 26 September 1916), as well as alternating deployments in Düsseldorf and Namur. Command was held sequentially by Captain Felix Jacobi and Captain Barth. It conducted three bombing missions, during which a total of 4,513 kg of bombs were dropped.

On 9 November 1915, LZ 81 transported a group of diplomats by air from Temeswar in what was then the Kingdom of Hungary (1867–1918) across enemy-held Serbia to Sofia. It was only considered for combat missions after improvements were made to its 240-hp engines. From February 1916, LZ 81 was deployed on the Western Front. During a raid on Étables on 25 April 1916, it was damaged by enemy fire and became tail-heavy. Despite additional setbacks including engine failure, the crew managed to return safely. A broken propeller shaft forced another pause in operations. In the summer of 1916, the ship was extended by 15 meters at Dresden-Kaditz, increasing its hydrogen volume and payload capacity. This was followed by further missions in Southeastern Europe.

=== Fate ===
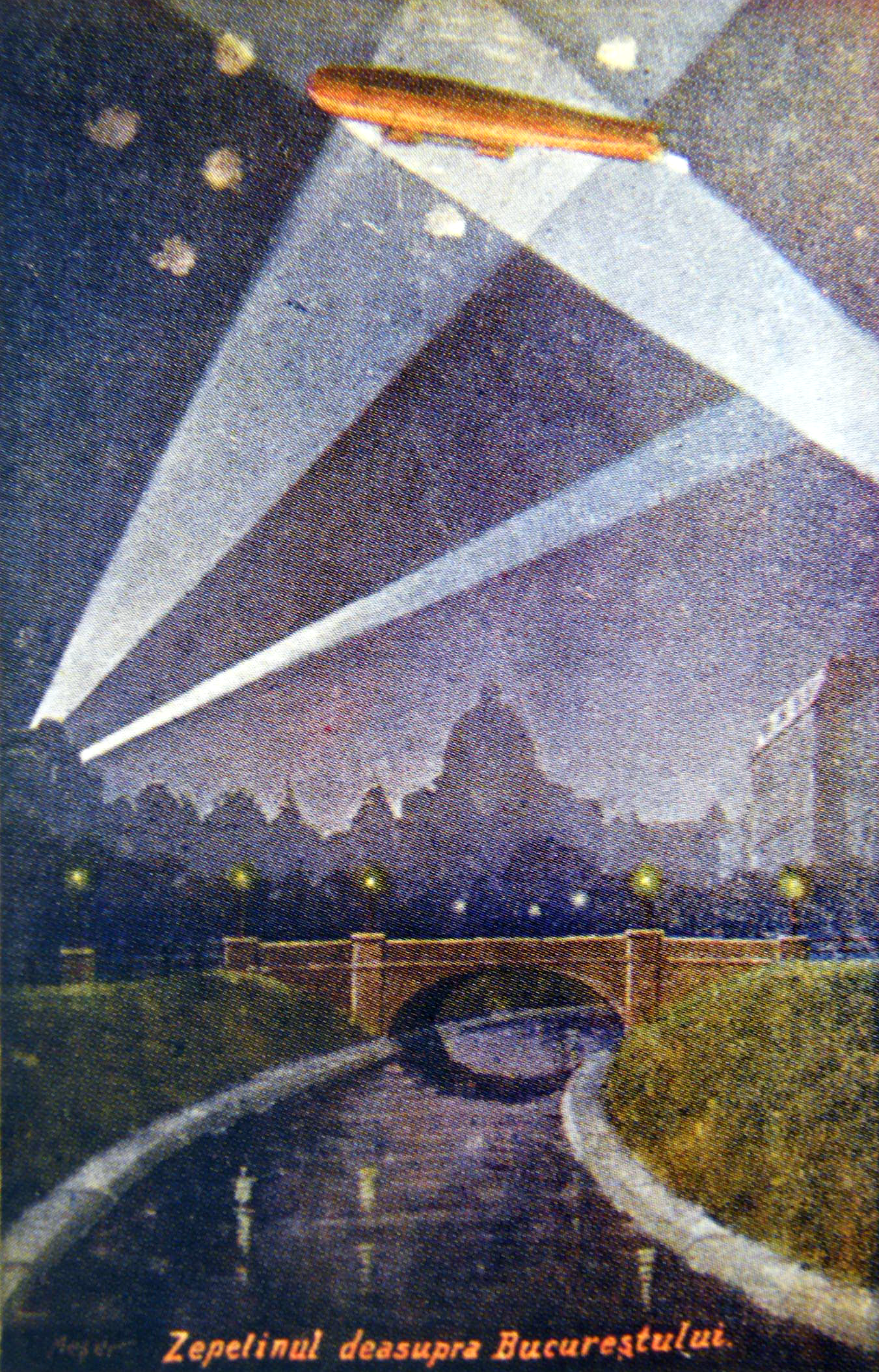
German Zeppelin over Bucharest

The airship was one of many P-class Zeppelins lost to enemy action. During a second raid on Bucharest in late September 1916, the ship sustained hits and was forced to make an emergency landing near Tirnowa, Bulgaria, on 27 September 1916 while attempting to return to base. One crew member died of injuries sustained in the crash. The ultimate fate of the wreckage remains unknown.

== Specifications ==
- Gas volume:
  - 31,900 m³ hydrogen (pre-refit)
  - 35,800 m³ hydrogen (post-refit)
- Length:
  - 163.5 m (pre-refit)
  - 178.5 m (post-refit)
- Diameter: 18.7 m
- Payload:
  - 15.6 t (pre-refit)
  - 17.9 t (post-refit)
- Powerplant: Four six-cylinder Maybach engines, each rated at 240 kW
- Speed: 26.7 m/s
- Range: 2,150 km
- Service ceiling: 3,900 m
- Armament: 2 × 8 mm Maxim machine guns
- Crew: approx. 18 men

== See also ==
- List of Zeppelins
