= Zeppelin LZ 47 =

German World War I-era zeppelin

LZ 47 (LZ 77)
- Postcard of LZ 47 (LZ 77) Luftschiff, Zeppelin

General information
- Type: P-class reconnaissance-bomber rigid airship
- National origin: German Empire
- Manufacturer: Luftschiffbau Zeppelin
- Designer: Ludwig Dürr
- Status: Destroyed in the Battle of Verdun 21 February 1916
- Primary user: Imperial German Navy
- Number built: 1

History
- First flight: 24 August 1915

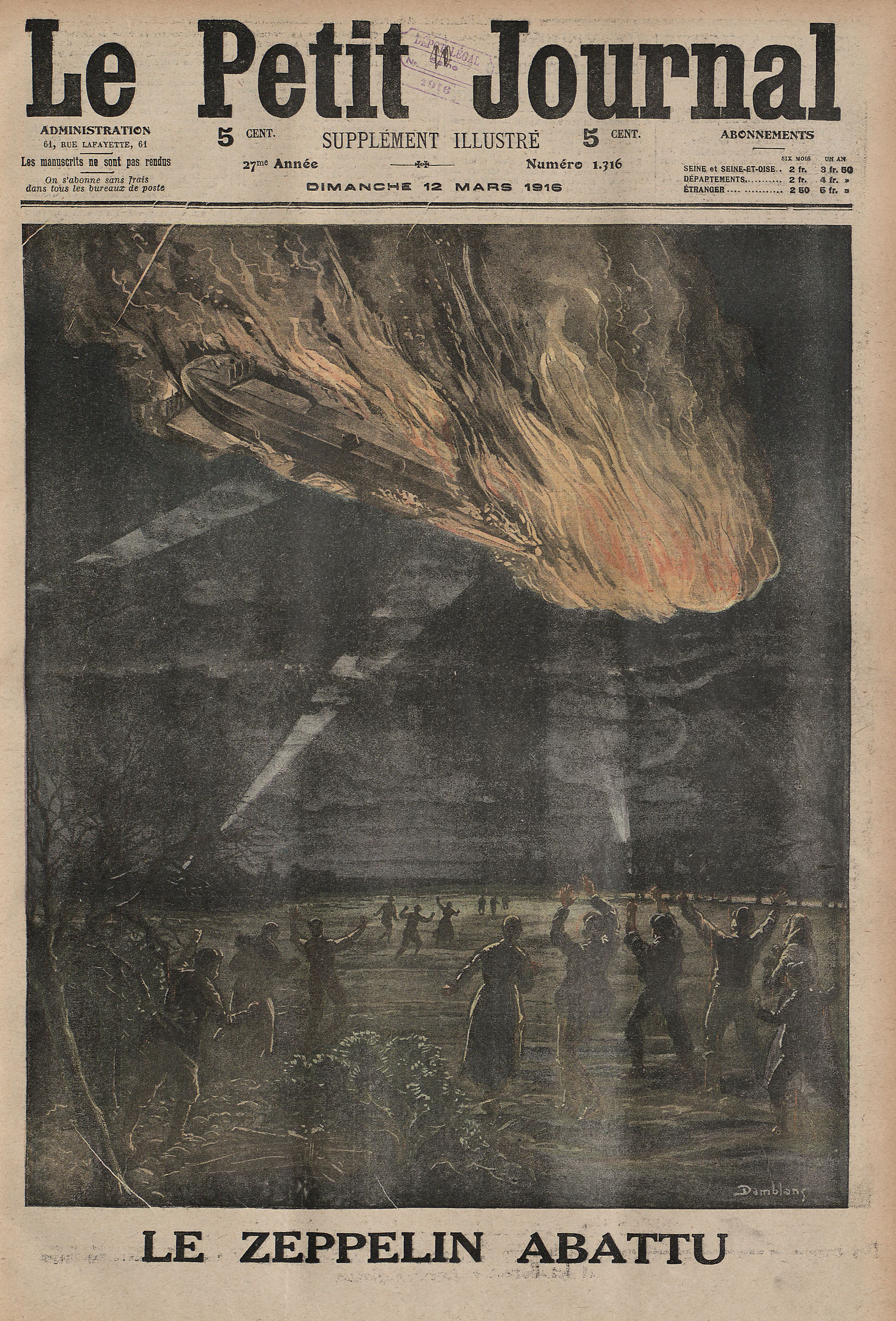
Le Petit Journal from March 12, 1916 soon after the downing of Zeppelin LZ 47 (LZ 77)

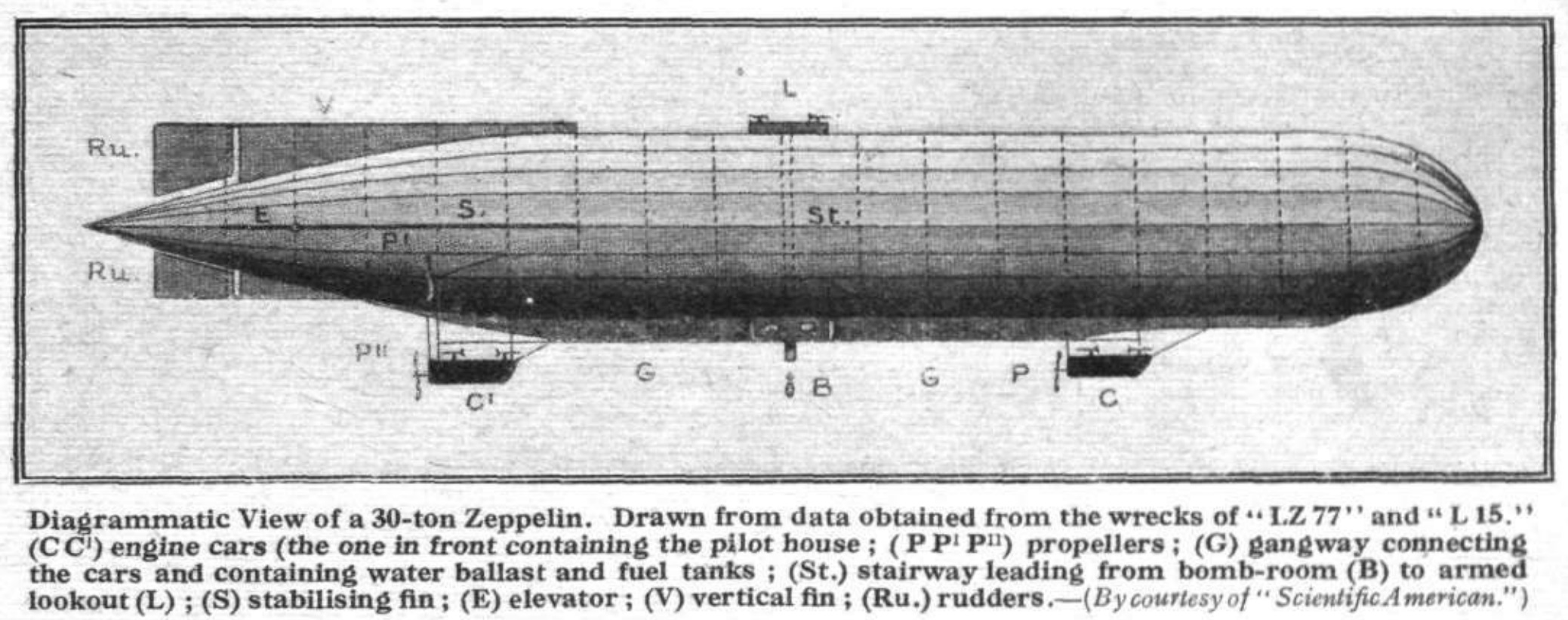
Diagrammatic View of a 30-ton Zeppelin Drawn from data obtained from the wrecks of LZ 47 (LZ 77)

The Imperial German Army Zeppelin LZ 47 (LZ 77) was a P-class World War I zeppelin. Destroyed by enemy fire on 21 February 1916 in the Battle of Verdun, killing the crew of 15.

== Operational history ==
The Airship took part in six attacks on England and France dropping 12,610 kg (27,800 lb) of bombs.

== Destruction ==
Reports at the time indicated LZ 77 had searchlights, eight machine guns, two so-called 'revolver' guns in the top lookout post, was accompanied by fixed-wing aircraft and at least one other Zeppelin and had orders to bomb nearby railway lines. (Note: 8.30 p.m. that the airship was reported ... 6,000 ft. ... over Sommeille, using its searchlights for a brief moment. ... flew over Révigny ... The third shell, an incendiary one, found the target. ... came to earth slowly ... no explosion until the Zeppelin touched the ground ... seen by many ... from ... Révigny, ... village of Brabant-le-Roi ... Ten miles away, another Zeppelin, ... watched the fate of its companion and then turned and disappeared. At the same time a third Zeppelin flew over Lunéville and dropped bombs ... German source gives the following details ... carried over twenty of a crew, eight machine guns, and on the overhead platform two 'revolver' guns. Her orders were to bomb the railway junctions behind the front, especially, perhaps for its importance to Verdun (which is only some thirty miles away). ... three aeroplanes accompanied the Zeppelin.) Destroyed by enemy fire on 21 February 1916 on the opening day of the Battle of Verdun, killing the crew of 15.

== Specifications ==
Data from , Giants in the Sky: A History of the Rigid Airship

General characteristics

- Crew: 18-19 (Executive Officer, Commander, Navigator, Sailmaker (responsible for gasbags), Chief Engineer, 2 altitude coxswains, 2 steering coxswains, 8 engineers)
- Capacity: 16,200 kg (35,715 lb) typical disposable load
- Length: 163.5 m (536 ft 5 in)
- Diameter: 18.7 m (61 ft 4 in) maximum
- Fineness ratio: 8.68
- Volume: 31,900 m^{3} (1,130,000 cu ft)
- Empty weight: 20,800 kg (45,856 lb)
- Fuel capacity: 4,800 kg (10,582 lb) maximum
- Useful lift: 37,000 kg (82,000 lb)
- Powerplant: 4 × Maybach C-X 6-cylinder water-cooled inline piston engine, 160 kW (210 hp) each
- Propellers: 2-bladed fixed-pitch propellers

Performance

- Maximum speed: 96.1 km/h (59.7 mph, 51.9 kn)
- Cruise speed: 90 km/h (56 mph, 49 kn)
- Range: 4,300 km (2,700 mi, 2,300 nmi)
- Service ceiling: 2,800 m (9,200 ft) static

Armament

- Guns: 7 or 8 machine guns: naval airships generally using the water-cooled MG 08, army ships the air-cooled Parabellum MG 14
- Bombs: 2,000 kg (4,400 lb) bombs (a greater load could be carried with reduced fuel load)

== See also ==
- List of Zeppelins

== Bibliography ==
Notes

References

- Flight Magazine (August 31, 1916). "1916 – 0744". Flight Magazine. Stanley Spooner. ISSN 0015-3710. Archived from the original on October 21, 2012.
- "1916 – 0185". Flight Magazine. March 2, 1916. ISSN 0015-3710. Archived from the original on November 15, 2019.
