= Zeppelin LZ 20 =

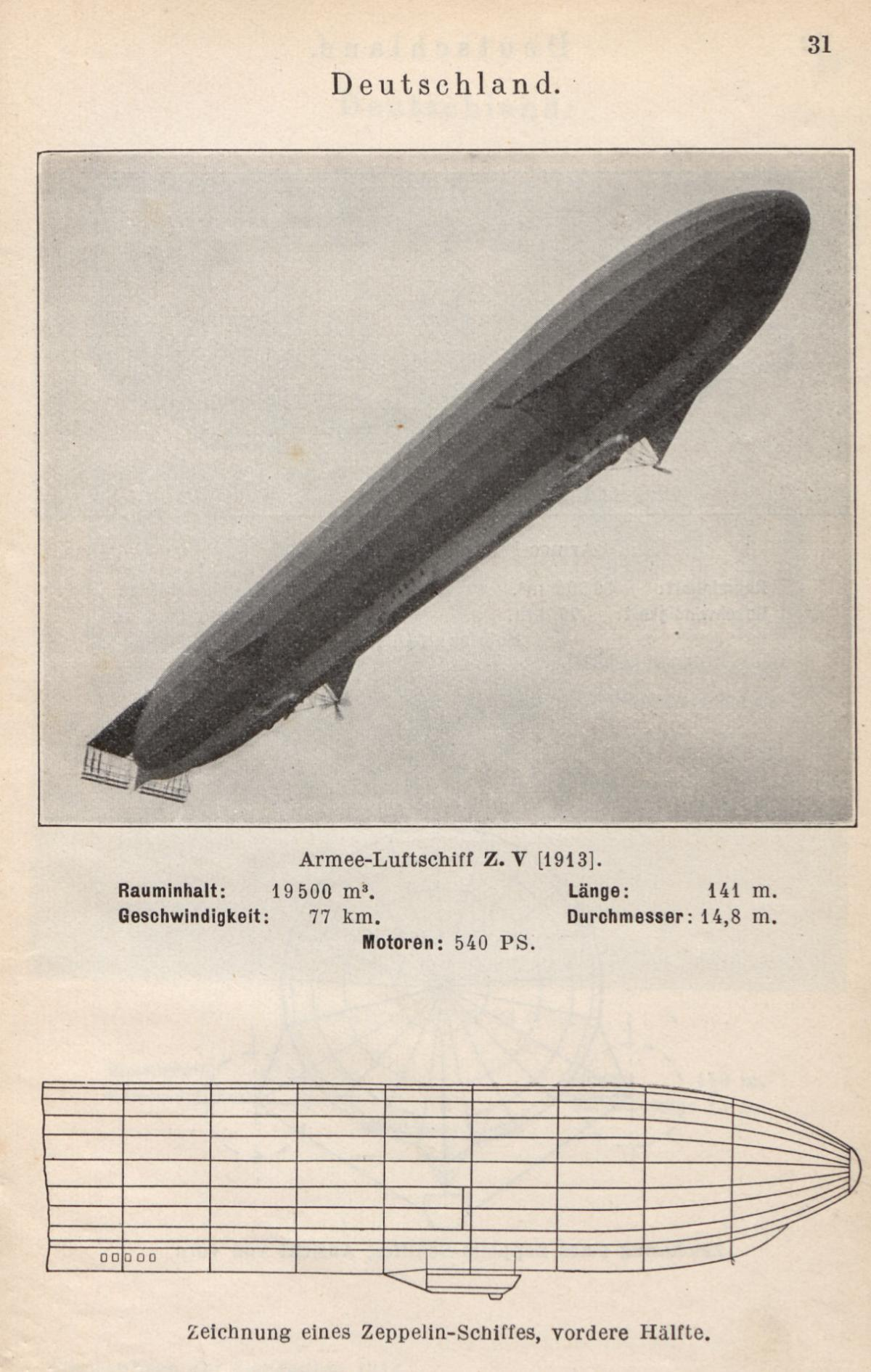
LZ 20 / Z V

LZ 20, with military designation Z V, was the twentieth Zeppelin airship constructed by Count Ferdinand von Zeppelin and the eighth airship operated by the Imperial German Army.

== History ==
LZ 20 made its first flight on 8 July 1913. As an Army airship, it bore the military designation Z V. With the outbreak of World War I, Z V was deployed to the Eastern Front in August 1914, conducting reconnaissance missions over Russian Poland. During one mission, the airship was damaged by intense enemy rifle and machine-gun fire. It was also mistakenly fired upon by German troops. Despite this, Z V continued to fly reconnaissance missions later that month and dropped small bombs on Russian forces.

== Loss ==
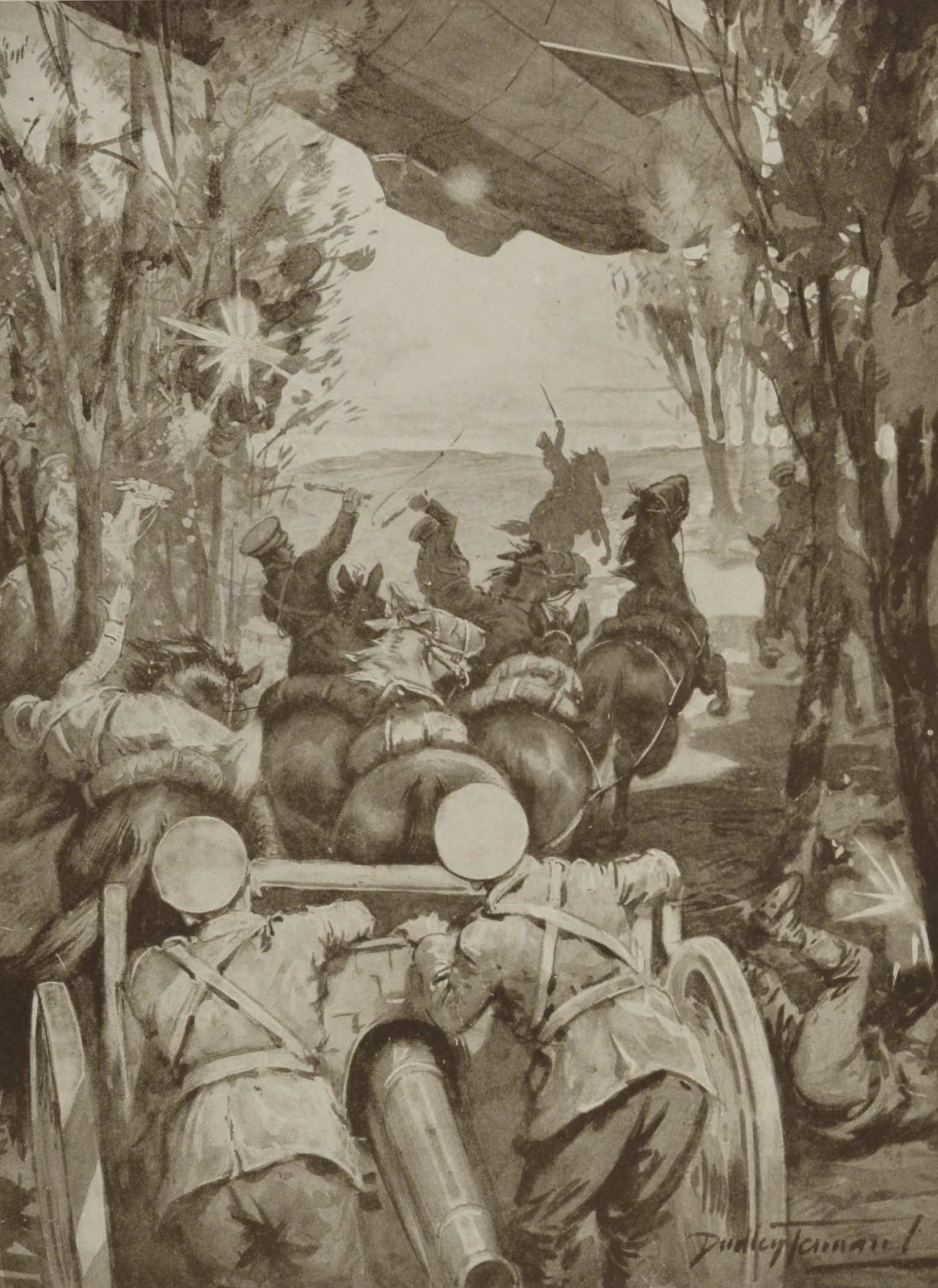
As a Russian cavalry brigade, with a horse battery, was proceeding towards the Russo-German frontier in September, 1914. The battery promptly opened fire and Zeppelin was shot down.

On 28 August 1914, during the Battle of Tannenberg, Z V carried out an air raid on the railway facilities at Mława. Enemy fire punctured several gas cells, causing a critical loss of lift gas. The Zeppelin was forced to make an emergency landing in enemy territory. The crew attempted to destroy the wreck by setting it on fire, but they were captured by advancing Russian cavalry.

== Specifications ==
- Gas volume: 22,500 m³ of hydrogen
- Length: 158.0 m
- Diameter: 14.90 m
- Payload: 9.5 t
- Engines: Three Maybach engines, 165 hp each
- Top speed: 76 km/h

== See also ==
- List of Zeppelins
