= Zeppelin LZ 44 =

Zeppelin used by the German Army in World War I

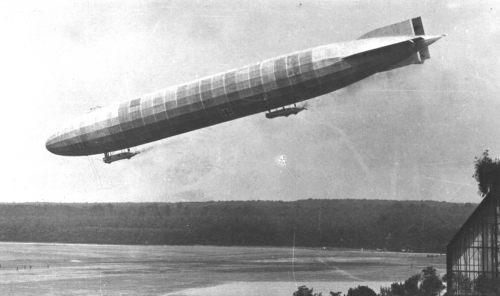
Germany army airship Zeppelin LZ 44 (LZ 74)

LZ 44, designated by the military as LZ 74, was the 44th Zeppelin built by Ferdinand von Zeppelin and the 21st operated by the Imperial German Army during World War I.

== History ==
LZ 44 made its maiden flight on 8 July 1915. Upon delivery to the German Army, it was designated LZ 74. The airship was primarily used for bombing raids over England during the First World War.

On 8 October 1915, during a mission, the airship encountered dense fog and collided with a mountain in the Schnee Eifel region, near Orthe, France. The impact tore off both gondolas, and the resulting loss of weight caused the airship to ascend rapidly to 4,000 meters. Despite the damage, the airship was able to descend and land. There were no fatalities, though most of the crew were injured. LZ 44 was subsequently dismantled.

== Specifications ==
- Volume of lifting gas: 31,900 m³ (hydrogen)
- Length: 163.00 m
- Diameter: 18.70 m
- Payload: 16.2 t
- Powerplant: Four Maybach engines, each producing 210 PS (154 kW)
- Top speed: 26.7 m/s (approx. 96 km/h)

== See also ==
- List of Zeppelins
