= Zeppelin LZ 43 =

German World War I-era zeppelin

LZ 43 (L 12)
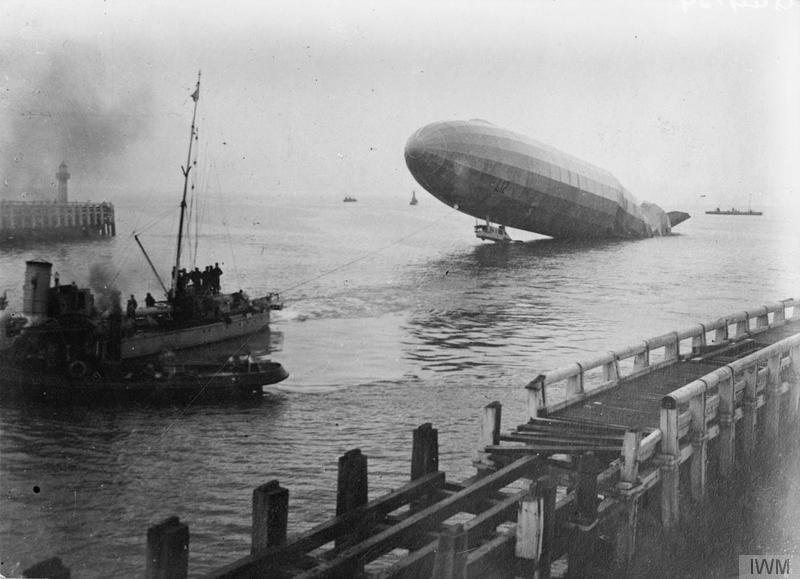
- Zeppelin LZ 43 being towed into bay

General information
- Type: P-class reconnaissance-bomber rigid airship
- National origin: German Empire
- Manufacturer: Luftschiffbau Zeppelin
- Designer: Ludwig Dürr
- Status: Burnt in Ostend, Belgium 10 August 1915
- Primary user: Imperial German Navy
- Number built: 1

History
- First flight: 21 June 1915

The Imperial German Army Zeppelin LZ 43 (L 12) was a P-class World War I zeppelin. While taking part in a bombing raid of the United Kingdom the Airship was hit by AA fire and it crashed outside of Ostend, Belgium on 10 August 1915. While being towed into the harbour, it burst into fire.

== Operational history ==
It took part in five reconnaissance missions.

== Destruction ==
While commanded by Oberleutnant-zur-See Werner Peterson, on 9 August 1915, it took part in a raid on the United Kingdom with L 10, L 11, and L 13 (L 13 turned back early with engine problems). The Airship was blown off course and took heavy fire while flying over Dover. It dropped 10 bombs, allowing it to rise above the AA fire. Of the 10 bombs only four hit land, two struck the parapet of Admiralty Pier, and a third hit its Transport Office. The fourth bomb fell under the bows of the trawler Equinox, wounding three.

L 12 did not escape bombing Dover without taking damage and starting leaking hydrogen. It crashed into the sea a few miles out from Ostend. Torpedo boats towed her into harbour but she burst into flames while being hauled out onto the dock.

== Specifications ==
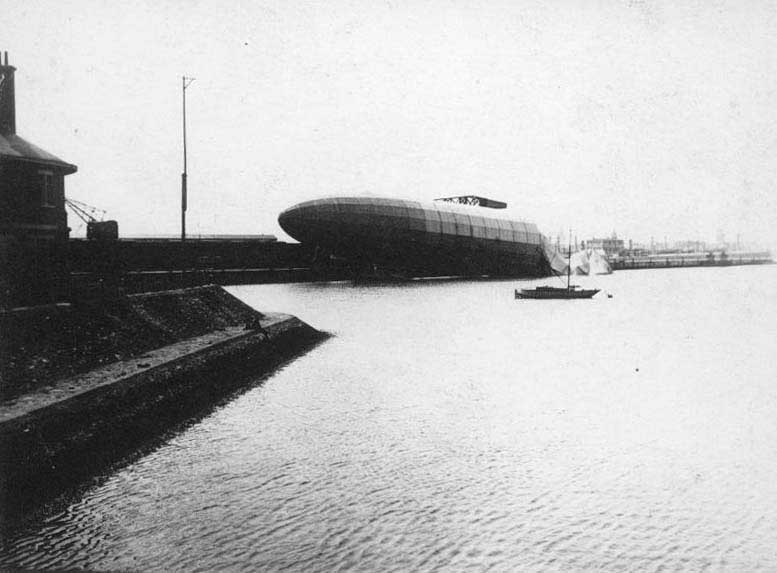
Zeppelin L 12 in Oostende Harbour

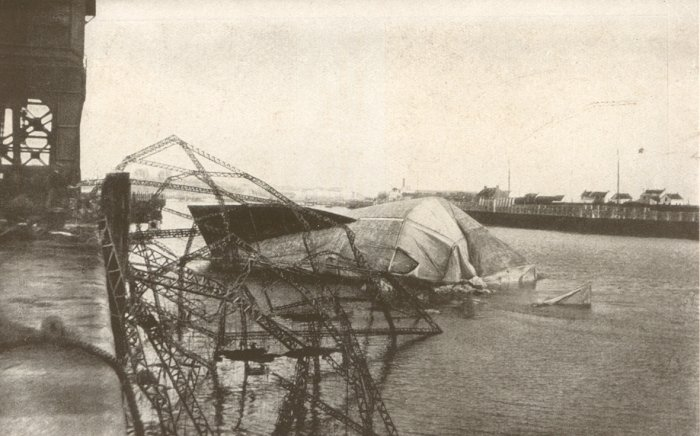
Wreck of Zeppelin L 12 in Oostende Harbour

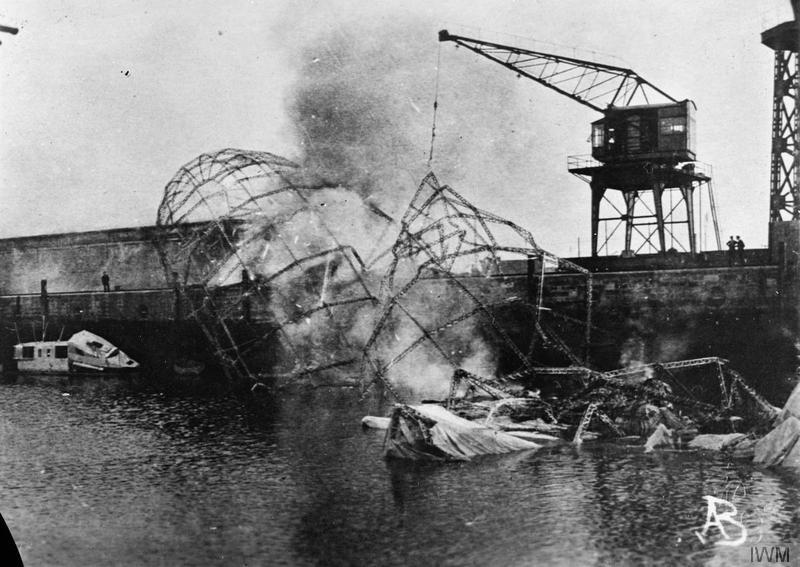
Smoking wreck of Zeppelin L 12 in Oostende Harbour

Data from Giants in the Sky: A History of the Rigid Airship

General characteristics

- Crew: 18-19 (Executive Officer, Commander, Navigator, Sailmaker (responsible for gasbags), Chief Engineer, 2 altitude coxswains, 2 steering coxswains, 8 engineers)
- Capacity: 16,200 kg (35,715 lb) typical disposable load
- Length: 163.5 m (536 ft 5 in)
- Diameter: 18.7 m (61 ft 4 in) maximum
- Fineness ratio: 8.68
- Volume: 31,900 m^{3} (1,130,000 cu ft)
- Empty weight: 20,800 kg (45,856 lb)
- Fuel capacity: 4,800 kg (10,582 lb) maximum
- Useful lift: 37,000 kg (82,000 lb)
- Powerplant: 4 × Maybach C-X 6-cylinder water-cooled inline piston engine, 160 kW (210 hp) each
- Propellers: 2-bladed fixed-pitch propellers

Performance

- Maximum speed: 96.1 km/h (59.7 mph, 51.9 kn)
- Cruise speed: 90 km/h (56 mph, 49 kn)
- Range: 4,300 km (2,700 mi, 2,300 nmi)
- Service ceiling: 2,800 m (9,200 ft) static

Armament

- Guns: 7 or 8 machine guns: naval airships generally using the water-cooled MG 08, army ships the air-cooled Parabellum MG 14
- Bombs: 2,000 kg (4,400 lb) bombs (a greater load could be carried with reduced fuel load)

== See also ==
- List of Zeppelins

== Bibliography ==
=== References ===
- Brooks, Peter W. (1992). Zeppelin : rigid airships, 1893-1940. Washington, D.C.: Smithsonian Institution Press. pp. 91–95. ISBN 1560982284.
- Castle, Ian (2022). "9/10 August 1915 - E. Yorks, Kent & Suffolk". Ian Castle Zeppelin.
- Robinson, Douglas Hill (1973). Giants in the Sky: A History of the Rigid Airship. University of Washington Press. ISBN 9780295952499.
