= Zeppelin LZ 53 =

German World War I-era zeppelin

LZ 53 (L 17)
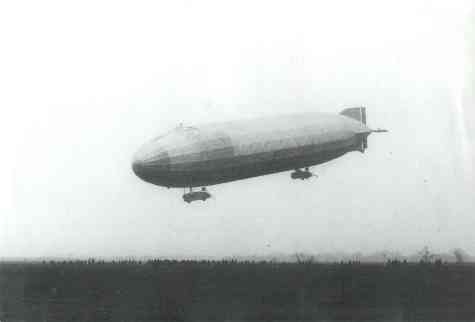
- Zeppelin LZ 53 (L 17)

General information
- Type: P-class reconnaissance-bomber rigid airship
- National origin: German Empire
- Manufacturer: Luftschiffbau Zeppelin
- Designer: Ludwig Dürr
- Status: Burned in its hangar when LZ 69 caught on fire and the fire spread to the hangar
- Primary user: Imperial German Navy
- Number built: 1

History
- First flight: 20 October 1915

The Imperial German Navy Zeppelin LZ 53 (L 17) was a P-class World War I zeppelin.

== Operational history ==
The Imperial German Navy first launched it on 20 October 1915 and throughout its career took part in 27 reconnaissance missions; nine attacks on England dropping 10,724 kg (23,642 lb) bombs.

== Destruction ==
Destroyed in its hangar at Tondern on 28 December 1916 when LZ 69 (L 24) caught fire.

== Specifications ==
Data from , Giants in the Sky: A History of the Rigid Airship

General characteristics

- Crew: 18-19 (Executive Officer, Commander, Navigator, Sailmaker (responsible for gasbags), Chief Engineer, 2 altitude coxswains, 2 steering coxswains, 8 engineers)
- Capacity: 16,200 kg (35,715 lb) typical disposable load
- Length: 163.5 m (536 ft 5 in)
- Diameter: 18.7 m (61 ft 4 in) maximum
- Fineness ratio: 8.68
- Volume: 31,900 m^{3} (1,130,000 cu ft)
- Empty weight: 20,800 kg (45,856 lb)
- Fuel capacity: 4,800 kg (10,582 lb) maximum
- Useful lift: 37,000 kg (82,000 lb)
- Powerplant: 4 × Maybach C-X 6-cylinder water-cooled inline piston engine, 160 kW (210 hp) each
- Propellers: 2-bladed fixed-pitch propellers

Performance

- Maximum speed: 96.1 km/h (59.7 mph, 51.9 kn)
- Cruise speed: 90 km/h (56 mph, 49 kn)
- Range: 4,300 km (2,700 mi, 2,300 nmi)
- Service ceiling: 2,800 m (9,200 ft) static

Armament

- Guns: 7 or 8 machine guns: naval airships generally using the water-cooled MG 08, army ships the air-cooled Parabellum MG 14
- Bombs: 2,000 kg (4,400 lb) bombs (a greater load could be carried with reduced fuel load)

== See also ==
- List of Zeppelins

== Bibliography ==
Notes

References

- Robinson, Douglas Hill (1973). Giants in the Sky: A History of the Rigid Airship. University of Washington Press. ISBN 9780295952499.
- Topping, Alanson Dale (2001). When Giants Roamed the Sky: Karl Arnstein and the Rise of Airships from Zeppelin to Goodyear. University of Akron Press. ISBN 9781884836695. - Total pages: 276
