= Zeppelin LZ 52 =

German airship

LZ 52 (L 18)
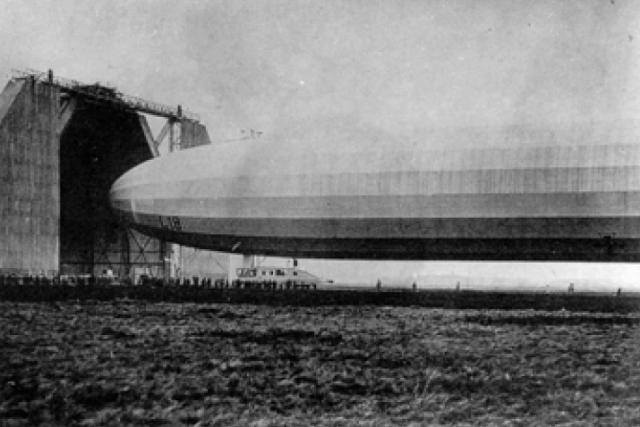

General information
- Type: Zeppelin P Class
- National origin: German Empire
- Manufacturer: Luftschiffbau Zeppelin

History
- Introduction date: 6 November 1915
- First flight: 3 April 1915 (lead ship: LZ 38)

LZ 52 was a German airship built by Luftschiffbau Zeppelin for the German Imperial German Navy and made its first flight on 3 April 1915. It was the 52nd Zeppelin constructed and the 18th operated by the Imperial German Navy under the tactical designation L 18. It belonged to the German P-class series of military airships. L 18 had the shortest service life of any Navy Zeppelin.

== History ==
The airship was built at the Löwental Zeppelin facility, along with five other P-class Zeppelins. It made its first flight on 3 November 1915 and was commissioned three days later. It was commanded by naval reserve Captain Lieutenant Max Dietrich. During its short operational life, L 18 completed only four flights. One of these was a transfer flight from Löwental on Lake Constance to Tønder, covering over 1,000 kilometers. Due to poor weather conditions, a stopover was made on 4 November 1915 at an army airship hangar in Hanover. The journey to Tønder continued on 16 November 1915.

== Fate ==
On 17 November 1915, while refilling its hydrogen gas at the "Toska" hangar in the Tønder airship base, a leaking pipe caused a fire to break out. The fire spread to L 18, which was completely destroyed. One crew member and six workers were killed in the accident, and seven others were injured. L 18 was the first of five Zeppelins to be destroyed by fire in the "Toska" twin hangar.

== Specifications ==
- Lifting gas volume: 31,900 m³ hydrogen
- Length: 163.5 m
- Diameter: 18.7 m
- Payload: 15.4 tonnes
- Engines: Four six-cylinder Maybach HSLu engines, each 240 PS (177 kW)
- Maximum speed: 26.7 m/s
- Range: 2,150 km
- Service ceiling: 3,900 m
- Armament: At least 3 × 8 mm Maxim machine guns
- Crew: 19 men
