= Zeppelin LZ 23 =

1914 Zeppelin L-class airship

LZ 23
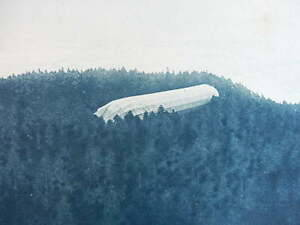
- Zeppelin LZ 23 after crashing in the Forest of Badonviller

General information
- Type: improved L-Class reconnaissance airship
- National origin: Germany
- Manufacturer: Luftschiffbau Zeppelin at Staaken
- Primary user: Imperial German Army
- Number built: 1

History
- First flight: 21 February 1914

The Zeppelin LZ 23 was the 2nd improved L-class Zeppelin, and the eleventh airship of the Imperial German Army, first flown on 21 February 1914 and shot-down by anti-aircraft fire on 23 August 1914.

== Operational history ==
The first trip from LZ 23 took place on May 11, 1914. As an airship of the army, LZ 23 had the identification, Z VIII.

Z VIII was launched in Metz at the end of July 1914 as it spent many months in its hangar without gas and not being used. Due to the critical global political situation at that time, the commander of Z VIII, Captain Andrée, finally was able to obtain the gas to fill the ship for operational readiness. At the beginning of the war in early August 1914, the Zeppelin was able to fly reconnaissance and disruptive flights against the marching French troops.

On August 21, 1914, Z VIII received the same order as Z VII, reconnaissance and bombing of French troops that had entered the German empire in Alsace. On the way to the reconnaissance area, the Zeppelin was bombarded and damaged in a friendly fire incident. Over the enemy lines, Z VIII dropped its bomb load of 160 kilograms (350 lb). The French managed to damage the airship's controls, causing it to float around uncontrollably, and the holes in the shell caused by the shelling led to the loss of the gas providing lift. The gas loss finally forced an emergency landing in the French part of Lorraine in the Forest of Badonviller. The ship's commander destroyed the secret papers and the crew disembarked. An attempt was made to burn the zeppelin, but the small amount of gas remaining in the cells could not be ignited. A squadron of French cavalry attacked the ship's crew, who managed to get through to the German lines and report their reconnaissance results. The wreck of LZ 23 was looted by French troops but this material fell back into German hands due to the advance of the German army.

== Specifications (improved L-class) ==
Data from Peter W. Brooks's book Zeppelin : rigid airships 1893-1940

General characteristics

- Crew: 18
- Length: 156 m (511 ft 10 in)
- Diameter: 14.9 m (48 ft 11 in) maximum
- Frame spacing: 8 m (26 ft)
- Fineness ratio: 10.47
- Number of gas cells: 18
- Volume: 22,140 m^{3} (782,000 cu ft)
- Empty weight: 16,850 kg (37,148 lb) 65% of typical gross lift
- Useful lift: 25,700 kg (56,700 lb) typical gross lift
- Typical disposable load: 8,850 kg (19,511 lb)
- Powerplant: 3 × Maybach CX 6-cylinder water-cooled in-line piston engines, 130 kW (180 hp) each
- Propellers: 4-bladed fixed-pitch propellers

Performance

- Maximum speed: 72 km/h (45 mph, 39 kn)
- Range: 1,900 km (1,200 mi, 1,000 nmi)

Armament

- Bombs: typically

- 5x 50 kg (110 lb) high explosive bombs
- 20x 3 kg (7 lb) incendiary bombs
