= Zeppelin LZ 17 =

LZ 17 Sachsen
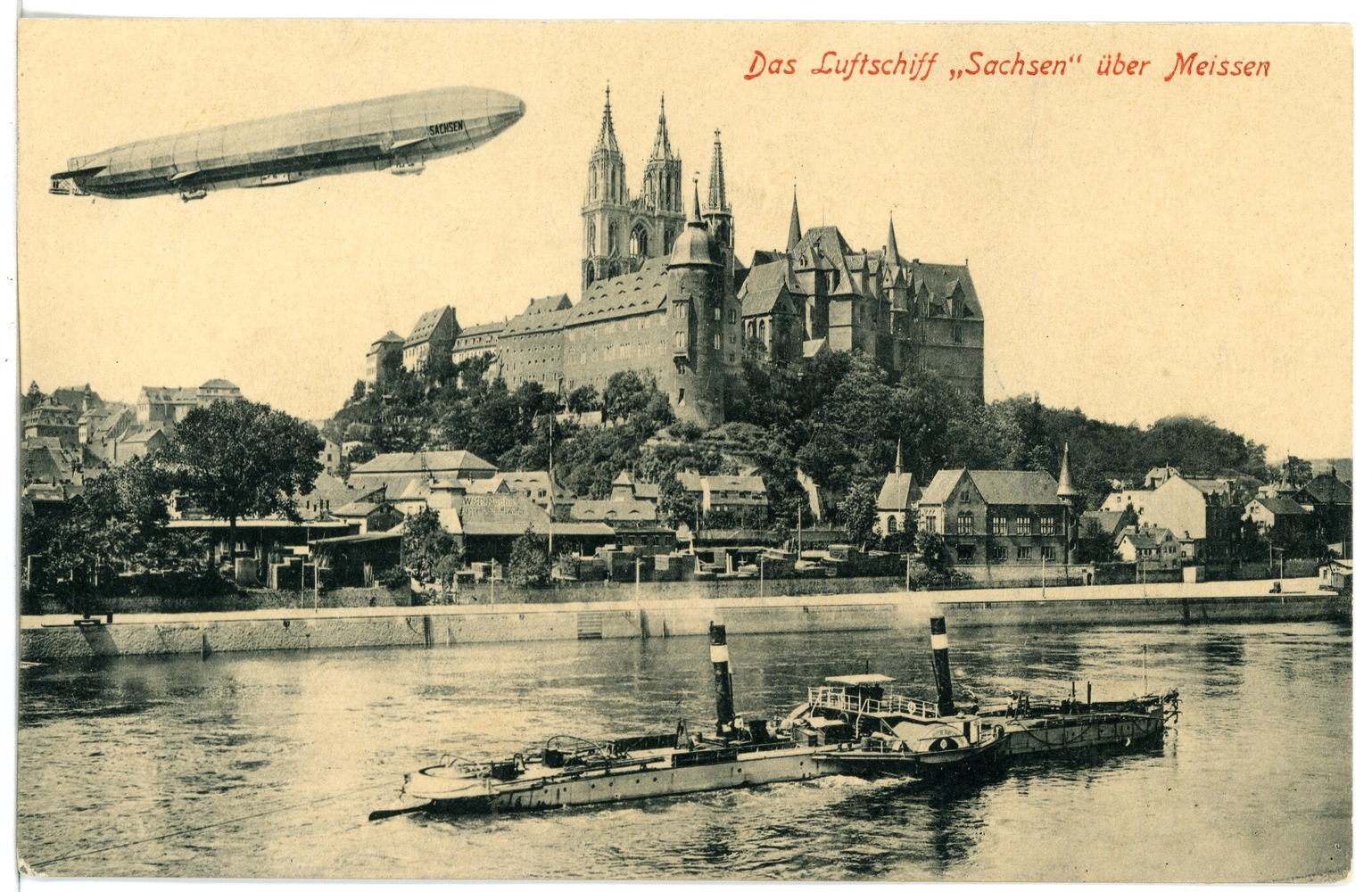
- Sachsen over Meißen in 1913

General information
- Type: Airship
- National origin: Germany
- Manufacturer: Luftschiffbau Zeppelin
- Primary users: DELAG (Deutsche Luftschiffahrts-Aktiengesellschaft - German Airship Travel Corporation"): Imperial German Army; Imperial German Navy

History
- First flight: 3 May 1913

LZ 17 Sachsen was the fourth Type H improved Schwaben-class Zeppelin that first flew on 3 May 1913 and operated as a passenger airship with DELAG (Deutsche Luftschiffahrts-Aktiengesellschaft) until WWI, when it was commandeered for service with the Imperial German Army. After being transferred to the Imperial German Navy, LZ17 was dismantled in 1916.

== History ==
From its introduction until the beginning of WWI, LZ 17 carried 9837 people in 419 flights, mainly on sightseeing flights in the service of DELAG, primarily between Dresdsen, Leipzig, Potsdam, Hamburg, Friedrichshafen, Baden-Oos, and Leignitz.

On 1 August 1914 LZ 17 was transferred to the Imperial German Army and equipped with bomb racks capable of carrying up to 3,000 kg (6,600 lb) of bombs as well as machine guns. Peter Strasser, leader of the Imperial German Navy airship service, received his training on board the airship in 1914 and shortly thereafter it took part in several raids against Antwerp. It quickly became clear that the airship was not suitable for warfare on the western front, and as a result was transferred to Allenstein in early 1915, continuing with smaller raids on Białystok and Ciechanów throughout the year.

Damaged during a landing, LZ17 was shortened to 148 m (486 ft), and its carrying capacity reduced to 7,400 kg (16,300 lb) and the performance of the engines was also increased to 130 kW (180 hp) during repairs. As LZ 17A, the airship was transferred to the Imperial German navy at Königsberg, where it was decommissioned 12 months later, in 1916, as one of Germany's most successful small airships.

== Specifications (Military Type H Zeppelin) ==
Data from Zeppelin : rigid airships, 1893-1940

General characteristics

- Crew: 20
- Length: 158 m (518 ft 4 in)
- Diameter: 14.6 m (47 ft 11 in)
- Volume: 19,500 m^{3} (690,000 cu ft)
- Empty weight: 17,900 kg (39,463 lb)
- Useful lift: 26,100 kg (57,500 lb)
- Powerplant: 3 × Maybach B-Y 6-cyl water-cooled in-line piston engines, 123 kW (165 hp) each

Performance

- Maximum speed: 76.32 km/h (47.42 mph, 41.21 kn)
- Range: 2,300 km (1,400 mi, 1,200 nmi) maximum

Armament

- Guns: machine guns at front and rear of control cabin and in upper surface position at the rear
- Bombs: 3,600 kg (7,900 lb) of bombs

== Notable Captains ==
Several captains commanded LZ 17, they included:

- Hugo Eckener
- Ernst A. Lehmann
- Georg Hacker
