= Battle of Jutland =

1916 major naval battle during World War I

- Part of World War I
- The Battle of Jutland, 1916
Date	31 May – 1 June 1916
Location	North Sea, near Denmark 56°42′N 5°54′E
Result	Inconclusive, see § Outcome

Belligerents
United Kingdom	Germany

Commanders and leaders
(United Kingdom of Great Britain and Ireland) Sir John Jellicoe; (United Kingdom of Great Britain and Ireland) Sir David Beatty	(German Empire) Reinhard Scheer; (German Empire) Franz Hipper

Strength
Total: 151 combat ships; 28 dreadnought battleships; 9 battlecruisers; 8 armoured cruisers; 26 light cruisers; 78 destroyers; 1 destroyer-minelayer; 1 seaplane carrier	Total: 99 combat ships; 16 dreadnought battleships; 5 battlecruisers; 6 pre-dreadnought battleships; 11 light cruisers; 61 torpedo-boats (Note: In this article the terms "torpedo boat" (sometimes "torpedo-boat") and "destroyer" are used interchangeably to refer to the same class of vessels in the German Navy.)

Casualties and losses
6,094 killed; 674 wounded; 177 captured; 3 battlecruisers sunk; 3 armoured cruisers sunk; 8 destroyers sunk; (113,300 tons sunk)	2,551 killed; 507 wounded; 1 battlecruiser sunk; 1 pre-dreadnought battleship sunk; 4 light cruisers sunk; 5 torpedo-boats sunk; (62,300 tons sunk)

The Battle of Jutland (Note: (/ˈdʒʌtlənd/, JUT-lənd; Danish: Søslaget ved Jylland, pronounced [ˈsœˌslɛːˀðə veð ˈjyˌlænˀ]; German: Skagerrakschlacht, lit. 'Battle of the Skagerrak', [ˈskaːɡəʁakˌʃlaxt])) was a naval battle between Britain's Royal Navy Grand Fleet, under Admiral Sir John Jellicoe, and the Imperial German Navy's High Seas Fleet, under Vice-Admiral Reinhard Scheer, during the First World War. The battle unfolded in extensive manoeuvring and three main engagements from 31 May to 1 June 1916, off the North Sea coast of Denmark's Jutland Peninsula. It was the largest naval battle and only full-scale clash of battleships of the war. Jutland was also the last major naval battle, in any war, fought primarily by battleships.

Germany's High Seas Fleet intended to lure out, trap, and destroy a portion of the British Grand Fleet. The German naval force was insufficient to openly engage the British fleet. This was part of a larger strategy to break the British blockade of Germany and allow German naval vessels access to the Atlantic. Britain's Royal Navy pursued a strategy of engaging and destroying the High Seas Fleet, thereby keeping German naval forces contained and away from Britain and her shipping lanes. The Germans planned to use Vice-Admiral Franz Hipper's fast scouting group of five modern battlecruisers to lure Vice-Admiral Sir David Beatty's battlecruiser squadrons into the path of the main German fleet. They stationed submarines across the likely routes of British reinforcements in the hope of inflicting significant losses on the main fleet. However, the British learned from signal intercepts that a major fleet operation was likely, so on 30 May, Jellicoe sailed with the Grand Fleet to rendezvous with Beatty, passing through the German submarine picket lines while they were unprepared. The German plan had been delayed, causing further problems for their submarines, which had reached the limit of their endurance at sea.

On the afternoon of 31 May, Beatty encountered Hipper's battlecruiser force earlier than the Germans had expected. Hipper successfully drew the British vanguard into the path of the High Seas Fleet. By the time Beatty sighted the larger force and turned back towards the British main fleet, he had lost two battlecruisers, from a force of six battlecruisers and four battleships. Beatty's withdrawal at the sight of the High Seas Fleet, which the British had not known was in the open sea, reversed the battle by drawing the Germans towards the British Grand Fleet. Between 18:30, when the sun was lowering, back-lighting the German forces, and nightfall at 20:30, the two fleets—totalling 250 ships—directly engaged twice. After sunset Jellicoe manoeuvred to cut the Germans off from their base, hoping to continue the battle the next morning, but under the cover of darkness Scheer broke through the British light forces forming the rearguard of the Grand Fleet and returned to port. Fourteen British and eleven German ships sank, with a total of 9,823 casualties.

Both sides claimed victory. The British lost more ships and over twice as many sailors but succeeded in containing the German fleet. The British press criticised the Grand Fleet's failure to force a decisive outcome, while Scheer's plan of destroying a substantial portion of the British fleet failed. The British long-term strategy of denying Germany access to the United Kingdom and Atlantic succeeded. The Germans' "fleet in being" continued to pose a threat, requiring the British to keep their battleships concentrated in the North Sea, but the battle reinforced the German policy of avoiding all fleet-to-fleet contact. At the end of 1916, after further unsuccessful attempts to reduce the Royal Navy's numerical advantage, the German Navy accepted its surface ships had been successfully contained, turning its resources to unrestricted submarine warfare for the second time (the first attempt of the war having ended with the controversy following the sinking of the RMS Lusitania by U-20) and destruction of Allied and neutral shipping, which—with the Zimmermann Telegram—by April 1917 triggered the United States of America's declaration of war on Germany. Reviews by the Royal Navy generated disagreement between supporters of Jellicoe and Beatty concerning their performance in battle; debate over this and the significance of the battle continues.

== Background and planning ==
=== German planning ===
With 16 dreadnought-type battleships, compared with the Royal Navy's 28, the German High Seas Fleet stood little chance of winning a head-to-head clash. The Germans therefore adopted a divide-and-conquer strategy. They would stage raids into the North Sea and bombard the English coast, with the aim of luring out small British squadrons and pickets, which could then be destroyed by superior forces or submarines. In January 1916, Admiral von Pohl, commander of the German fleet, fell ill. He was replaced by Scheer, who believed that the fleet had been used too defensively, had better ships and men than the British, and ought to take the war to them.According to Scheer, the German naval strategy should be:

to damage the English fleet by offensive raids against the naval forces engaged in watching and blockading the German Bight, as well as by mine-laying on the British coast and submarine attack, whenever possible. After an equality of strength had been realised as a result of these operations, and all our forces had been made ready and concentrated, an attempt was to be made with our fleet to seek battle under circumstances unfavourable to the enemy.

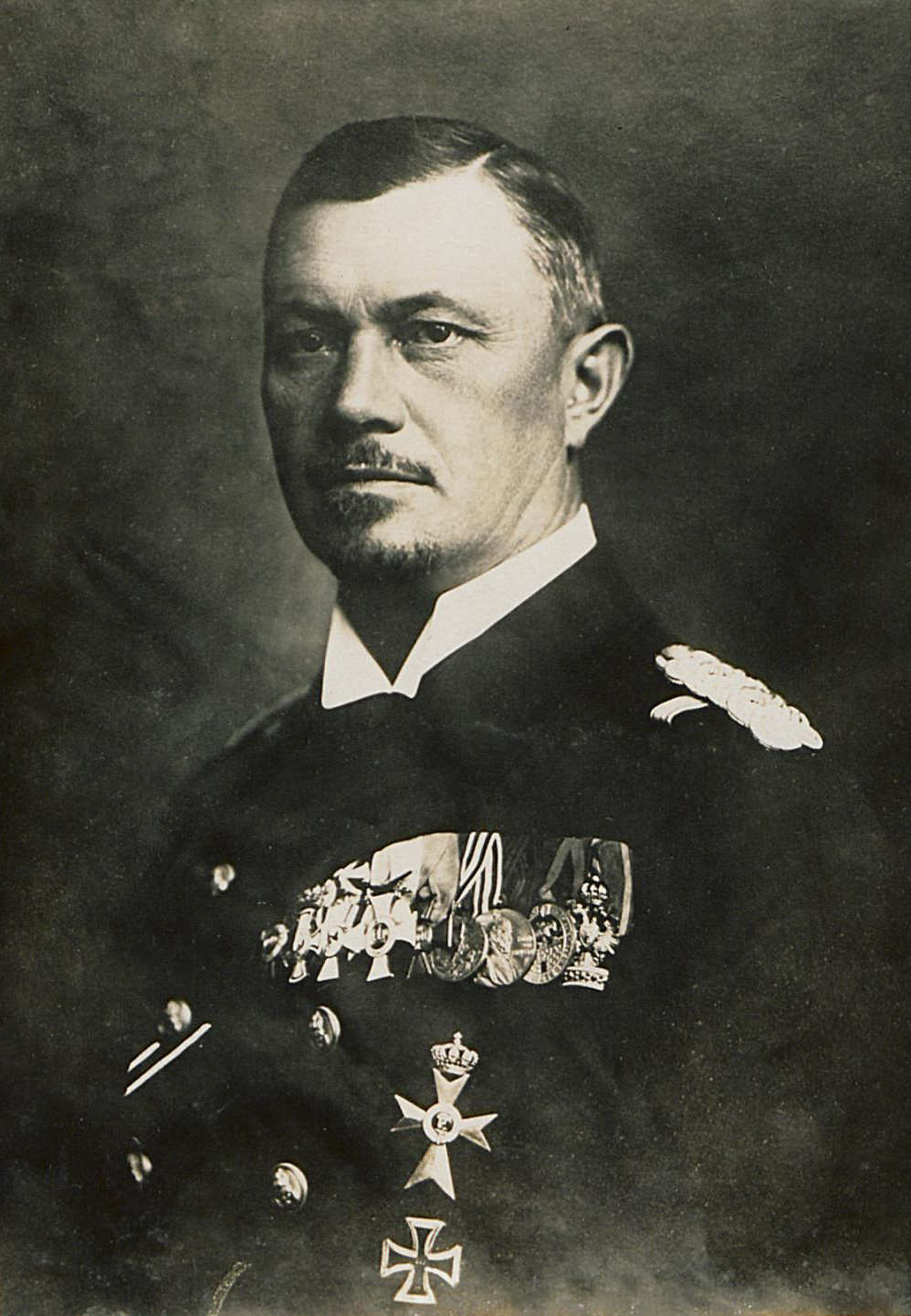
Reinhard Scheer, German fleet commander

On 25 April 1916, a decision was made by the German Imperial Admiralty to halt indiscriminate attacks by submarines on merchant shipping. This followed protests from neutral countries, notably the United States, that their nationals had been the victims of attacks. Germany agreed that future attacks would only take place in accord with internationally agreed prize rules, which required an attacker to give a warning and allow the crews of vessels time to escape, and not to attack neutral vessels at all. Scheer believed that it would not be possible to continue attacks on these terms, which took away the advantage of secret approach by submarines and left them vulnerable to even relatively small guns on the target ships. Instead, he set about deploying the submarine fleet against military vessels.

It was hoped that, following a successful German submarine attack, fast British escorts, such as destroyers, would be tied down by anti-submarine operations. If the Germans could catch the British in the expected locations, good prospects were thought to exist of at least partially redressing the balance of forces between the fleets. "After the British sortied in response to the raiding attack force", the Royal Navy's centuries-old instincts for aggressive action could be exploited to draw its weakened units towards the main German fleet under Scheer. The hope was that Scheer would thus be able to ambush a section of the British fleet and destroy it.

==== Submarine deployments ====
A plan was devised to station submarines offshore from British naval bases, and then stage some action that would draw out the British ships to the waiting submarines. The battlecruiser SMS Seydlitz had been damaged in a previous engagement, but was due to be repaired by mid-May, so an operation was scheduled for 17 May 1916. At the start of May, difficulties with condensers were discovered on ships of the third battleship squadron, so the operation was put back to 23 May. Ten submarines—U-24, U-32, U-43, U-44, UC-47, U-51, U-52, U-63, U-66, and U-70—were given orders first to patrol in the central North Sea between 17 and 22 May, and then to take up waiting positions. U-43 and U-44 were stationed in the Pentland Firth, which the Grand Fleet was likely to cross when leaving Scapa Flow, while the remainder proceeded to the Firth of Forth, awaiting battlecruisers departing Rosyth. Each boat had an allocated area, within which it could move around as necessary to avoid detection, but was instructed to keep within it. During the initial North Sea patrol the boats were instructed to sail only north–south so that any enemy who chanced to encounter one would believe it was departing or returning from operations on the west coast (which required them to pass around the north of Britain). Once at their final positions, the boats were under strict orders to avoid premature detection that might give away the operation. It was arranged that a coded signal would be transmitted to alert the submarines exactly when the operation commenced: "Take into account the enemy's forces may be putting to sea".

Additionally, UB-27 was sent out on 20 May with instructions to work its way into the Firth of Forth past May Island. U-46 was ordered to patrol the coast of Sunderland, which had been chosen for the diversionary attack, but because of engine problems it was unable to leave port and U-47 was diverted to this task. On 13 May, U-72 was sent to lay mines in the Firth of Forth; on the 23rd, U-74 departed to lay mines in the Moray Firth; and on the 24th, U-75 was dispatched similarly west of the Orkney Islands. UB-21 and UB-22 were sent to patrol the Humber, where (incorrect) reports had suggested the presence of British warships. U-22, U-46 and U-67 were positioned north of Terschelling to protect against intervention by British light forces stationed at Harwich.

On 22 May 1916, it was discovered that Seydlitz was still not watertight after repairs and would not now be ready until the 29th. The ambush submarines were now on station and experiencing difficulties of their own: visibility near the coast was frequently poor due to fog, and sea conditions were either so calm the slightest ripple, as from the periscope, could give away their position, or so rough as to make it very hard to keep the vessel at a steady depth. The British had become aware of unusual submarine activity, and had begun counter-patrols that forced the submarines out of position. UB-27 passed Bell Rock on the night of 23 May on its way into the Firth of Forth as planned, but was halted by engine trouble. After repairs it continued to approach, following behind merchant vessels, and reached Largo Bay on 25 May. There the boat became entangled in nets that fouled one of the propellers, forcing it to abandon the operation and return home. U-74 was detected by four armed trawlers on 27 May and sunk 25 mi (22 nmi; 40 km) south-east of Peterhead. U-75 laid its mines off the Orkney Islands, which, although they played no part in the battle, were responsible later for sinking the cruiser Hampshire carrying Lord Kitchener, the Secretary of State for War on 5 June, killing him and all but 12 of the crew. U-72 was forced to abandon its mission without laying any mines when an oil leak meant it was leaving a visible surface trail astern.

==== Zeppelins ====
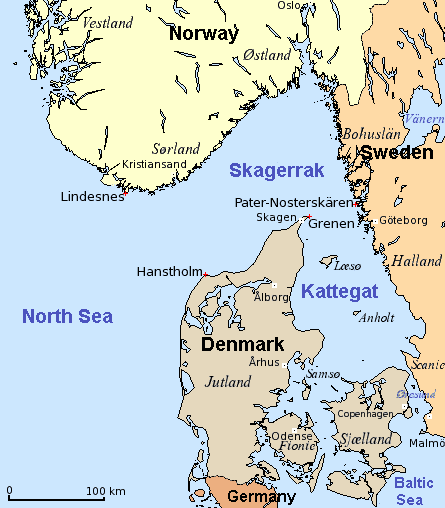
The throat of the Skagerrak, the strategic gateway to the Baltic and North Atlantic, waters off Jutland, Norway and Sweden

The Germans maintained a fleet of Zeppelins that they used for aerial reconnaissance and occasional bombing raids. The planned raid on Sunderland intended to use Zeppelins to watch out for the British fleet approaching from the north, which might otherwise surprise the raiders. By 28 May, strong north-easterly winds meant that it would not be possible to send out the Zeppelins, so the raid again had to be postponed. The submarines could stay on station only until 1 June before their supplies would be exhausted and they had to return, so a decision had to be made quickly about the raid. It was decided to use an alternative plan, abandoning the attack on Sunderland but instead sending a patrol of battlecruisers to the Skagerrak, where it was likely they would encounter merchant ships carrying British cargo and British cruiser patrols. It was felt this could be done without air support, because the action would now be much closer to Germany, relying instead on cruiser and torpedo boat patrols for reconnaissance.

Orders for the alternative plan were issued on 28 May, although it was still hoped that last-minute improvements in the weather would allow the original plan to go ahead. The German fleet assembled in the Jade River and at Wilhelmshaven and was instructed to raise steam and be ready for action from midnight on 28 May. By 14:00 on 30 May, the wind was still too strong and the final decision was made to use the alternative plan. The coded signal "31 May G.G.2490" was transmitted to the ships of the fleet to inform them the Skagerrak attack would start on 31 May. The pre-arranged signal to the waiting submarines was transmitted throughout the day from the E-Dienst radio station at Bruges, and the U-boat tender Arcona anchored at Emden. Only two of the waiting submarines, U-66 and U-32, received the order.

=== British response ===
Unfortunately for the German plan, the British had obtained a copy of the main German codebook from the light cruiser SMS Magdeburg, which had been boarded by the Russian Navy after the ship ran aground in Russian territorial waters in 1914. German naval radio communications could therefore often be quickly deciphered, and the British Admiralty usually knew about German activities.

The British Admiralty's Room 40 maintained direction finding and interception of German naval signals. It had intercepted and decrypted a German signal on 28 May that provided "ample evidence that the German fleet was stirring in the North Sea". Further signals were intercepted and, although they were not decrypted, it was clear that a major operation was likely. At 11:00 on 30 May, Jellicoe was warned that the German fleet seemed prepared to sail the following morning. By 17:00, the Admiralty had intercepted the signal from Scheer, "31 May G.G.2490", making it clear something significant was imminent.

Not knowing the Germans' objective, Jellicoe and his staff decided to position the fleet to head off any attempt by the Germans to enter the North Atlantic or the Baltic through the Skagerrak, by taking up a position off Norway where they could potentially cut off any German raid into the shipping lanes of the Atlantic or prevent the Germans from heading into the Baltic. A position further west was unnecessary, as that area of the North Sea could be patrolled by air.

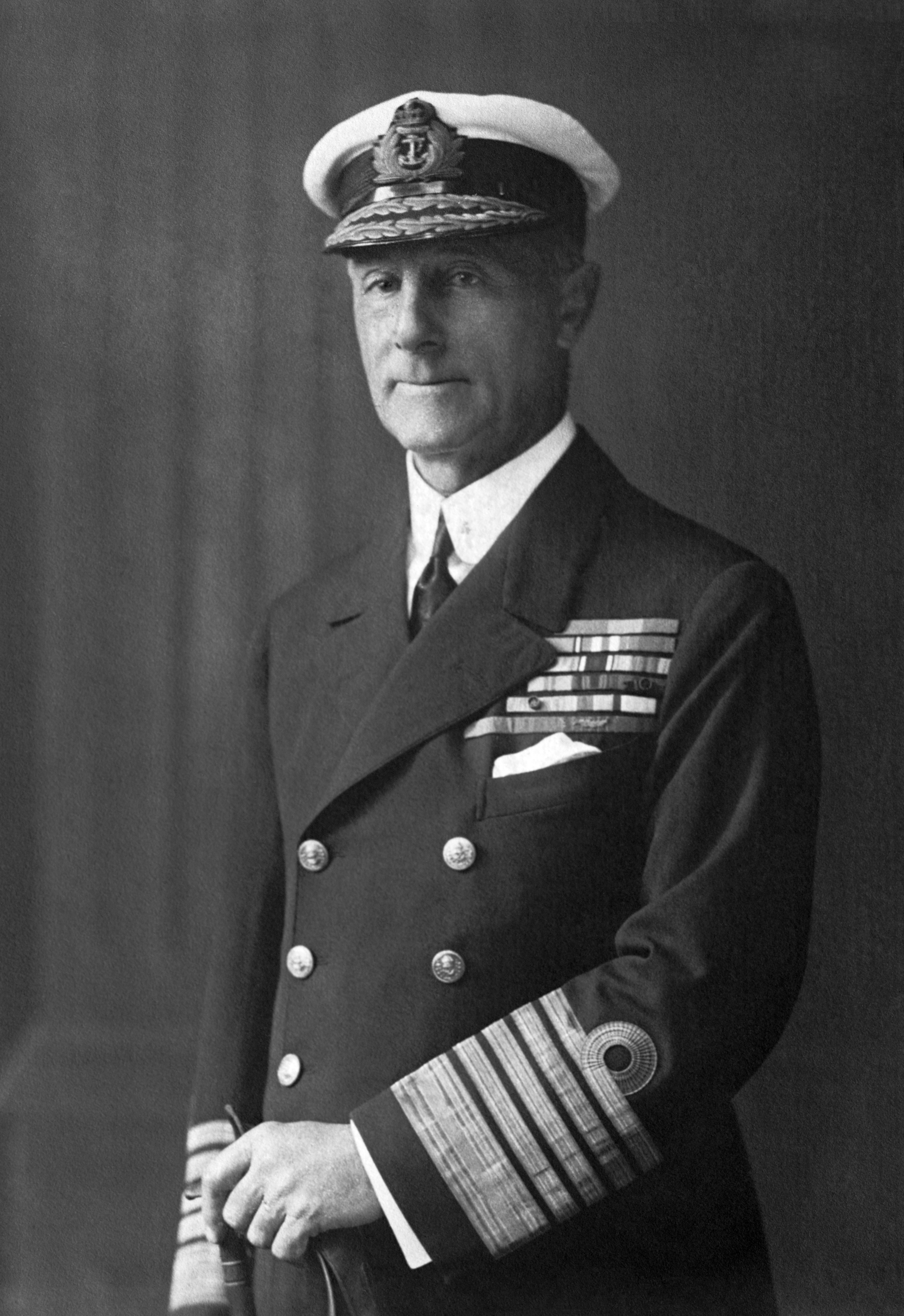
John Jellicoe, British fleet commander

Consequently, Admiral Jellicoe led the sixteen dreadnought battleships of the 1st and 4th Battle Squadrons of the Grand Fleet and three battlecruisers of the 3rd Battlecruiser Squadron eastwards out of Scapa Flow at 22:30 on 30 May. He was to meet the 2nd Battle Squadron of eight dreadnought battleships commanded by Vice-Admiral Martyn Jerram coming from Cromarty. Beatty's force of six ships of the 1st and 2nd Battlecruiser Squadrons plus the 5th Battle Squadron of four fast battleships left the Firth of Forth at around the same time; Jellicoe intended to rendezvous with him 90 mi (78 nmi; 140 km) west of the mouth of the Skagerrak off the coast of Jutland and wait for the Germans to appear or for their intentions to become clear. The planned position would give him the widest range of responses to likely German moves. Hipper's raiding force did not leave the Outer Jade Roads until 01:00 on 31 May, heading west of Heligoland Island following a cleared channel through the minefields, heading north at 16 knots (30 km/h; 18 mph). The main German fleet of sixteen dreadnought battleships of 1st and 3rd Battle Squadrons left the Jade at 02:30, being joined off Heligoland at 04:00 by the six pre-dreadnoughts of the 2nd Battle Squadron coming from the Elbe River.

== Naval tactics in 1916 ==
The principle of concentration of force was fundamental to the fleet tactics of this time. As outlined by Captain Reginald Hall in 1914, tactical doctrine called for a fleet approaching battle to be in a compact formation of parallel columns, allowing relatively easy manoeuvring, and giving shortened sight lines within the formation, which simplified the passing of the signals necessary for command and control.

A fleet formed in several short columns could change its heading faster than one formed in a single long column. Since most command signals were made with flags or signal lamps between ships, the flagship was usually placed at the head of the centre column so that its signals might be more easily seen by the many ships of the formation. Wireless telegraphy was in use, though security (radio direction finding), encryption, and the limitation of the radio sets made their extensive use more problematic. Command and control of such huge fleets remained difficult.

Thus, it might take a very long time for a signal from the flagship to be relayed to the entire formation. It was usually necessary for a signal to be confirmed by each ship before it could be relayed to other ships, and an order for a fleet movement would have to be received and acknowledged by every ship before it could be executed. In a large single-column formation, a signal could take 10 minutes or more to be passed from one end of the line to the other, whereas in a formation of parallel columns, visibility across the diagonals was often better (and always shorter) than in a single long column, and the diagonals gave signal "redundancy", increasing the probability that a message would be quickly seen and correctly interpreted.

However, before battle was joined the heavy units of the fleet would, if possible, deploy into a single column. To form the battle line in the correct orientation relative to the enemy, the commanding admiral had to know the enemy fleet's distance, bearing, heading, and speed. It was the task of the scouting forces, consisting primarily of battlecruisers and cruisers, to find the enemy and report this information in sufficient time, and, if possible, to deny the enemy's scouting forces the opportunity of obtaining the equivalent information.

Ideally, the battle line would cross the intended path of the enemy column so that the maximum number of guns could be brought to bear, while the enemy could fire only with the forward guns of the leading ships, a manoeuvre known as "crossing the T". Admiral Tōgō, commander of the Japanese battleship fleet, had achieved this against Admiral Zinovy Rozhestvensky's Russian battleships in 1905 at the Battle of Tsushima, with devastating results. Jellicoe achieved this twice in one hour against the High Seas Fleet at Jutland, but on both occasions, Scheer managed to turn away and disengage, thereby avoiding a decisive action.

=== Ship design ===
Within the existing technological limits, a trade-off had to be made between the weight and size of guns, the weight of armour protecting the ship, and the maximum speed. Battleships sacrificed speed for armour and heavy naval guns (11 in (280 mm) or larger). British battlecruisers sacrificed weight of armour for greater speed (their purpose being to catch and destroy cruisers while avoiding battleships), while their German counterparts were armed with lighter guns and heavier armour. These weight savings allowed them to escape danger or catch other ships. Generally, the larger guns mounted on British ships allowed an engagement at greater range. In theory, a lightly armoured ship could stay out of range of a slower opponent while still scoring hits. The fast pace of development in the pre-war years meant that every few years, a new generation of ships rendered its predecessors obsolete. Thus, fairly young ships could still be obsolete compared with the newest ships, and fare badly in an engagement against them. Some research has also shown that the chemicals used in British naval ammunition increased the chances of internal explosions.

Admiral John Fisher, responsible for reconstruction of the British fleet in the pre-war period, favoured large guns, fuel oil (rather than coal), and speed. Admiral Tirpitz, responsible for the German fleet, favoured ship survivability and chose to sacrifice some gun size for improved armour. The German battlecruiser SMS Derfflinger had belt armour equivalent in thickness—though not as comprehensive—to the British battleship HMS Iron Duke, significantly better than on the British battlecruisers such as Tiger. German ships had better internal subdivision and had fewer doors and other weak points in their bulkheads, but with the disadvantage that space for crew was greatly reduced. As they were designed only for sorties in the North Sea they did not need to be as habitable as the British vessels and their crews could live in barracks ashore when in harbour.

== Order of battle ==
	British	German
Dreadnought battleships	28	16
Pre-dreadnoughts	0	6
Battlecruisers	9	5
Armoured cruisers	8	0
Light cruisers	26	11
Destroyers	79	61
Seaplane carrier	1	0

Warships of the period were armed with guns firing projectiles of varying weights, bearing high explosive warheads. The sum total of weight of all the projectiles fired by all the ship's broadside guns is referred to as "weight of broadside". At Jutland, the total of the British ships' weight of broadside was 332,360 lb (150,760 kg), while the German fleet's total was 134,216 lb (60,879 kg). This does not take into consideration the ability of some ships and their crews to fire more or less rapidly than others, which would increase or decrease amount of fire that one combatant was able to bring to bear on their opponent for any length of time. Jellicoe's Grand Fleet was split into two sections. The dreadnought Battle Fleet, with which he sailed, formed the main force and was composed of 24 battleships and three battlecruisers. The battleships were formed into three squadrons of eight ships, further subdivided into divisions of four, each led by a flag officer. Accompanying them were eight armoured cruisers (classified by the Royal Navy since 1913 as "cruisers"), eight light cruisers, four scout cruisers, 51 destroyers, and one HMS Abdiel (1915) destroyer-minelayer.

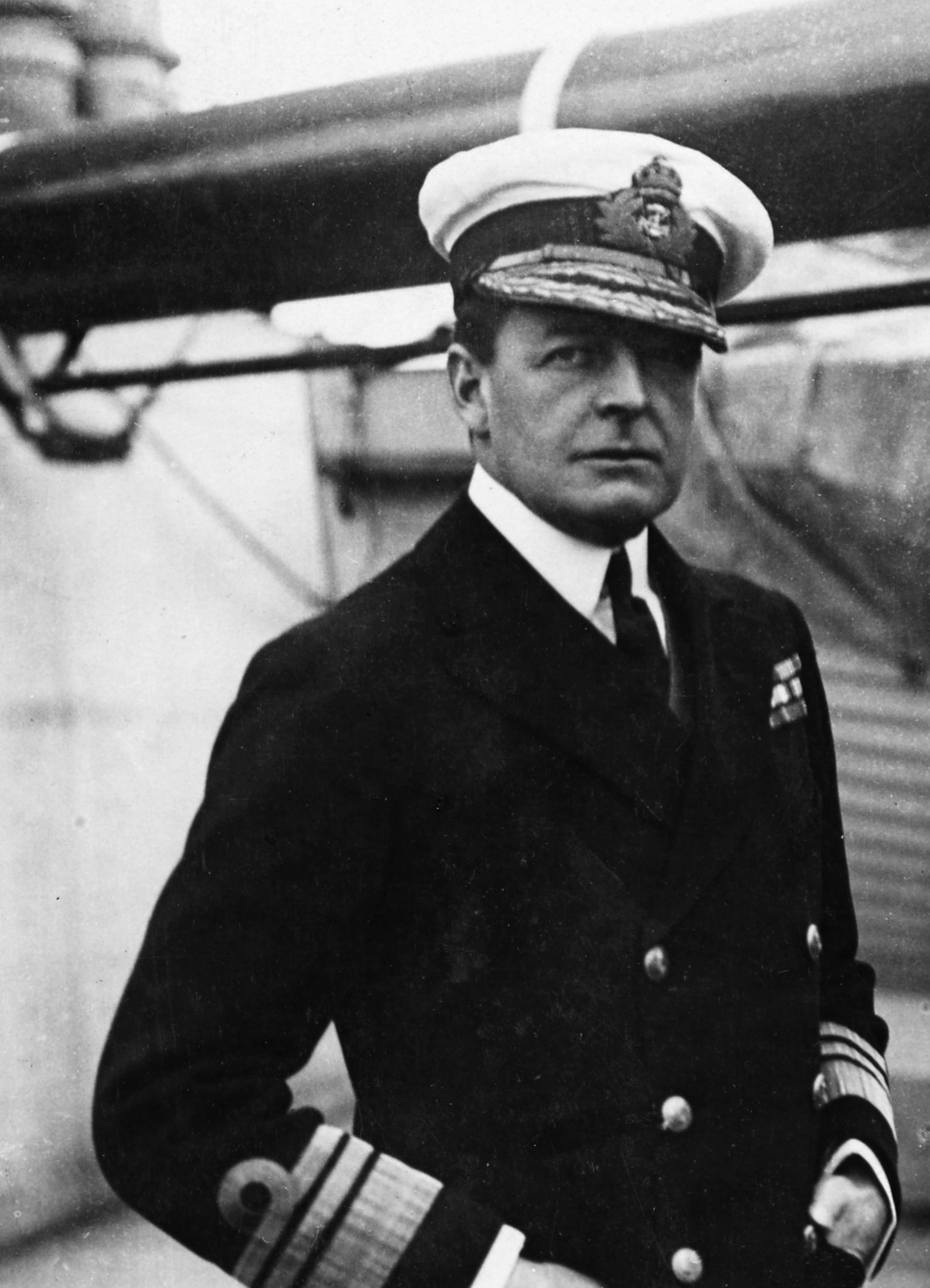
David Beatty, commander of the British battlecruiser fleet

British reconnaissance was provided by the Battlecruiser Fleet under David Beatty: six battlecruisers, four fast Queen Elizabeth-class battleships, 14 light cruisers and 27 destroyers. Air scouting was provided by the attachment of the seaplane tender HMS Engadine, one of the first aircraft carriers in history to participate in a naval engagement. The German High Seas Fleet under Scheer was also split into a main force and a separate reconnaissance force. Scheer's main battle fleet was composed of 16 battleships and six pre-dreadnought battleships arranged in an identical manner to the British. With them were six light cruisers and 31 torpedo-boats, (the latter being roughly equivalent to a British destroyer). The only German battleship missing was SMS König Albert.

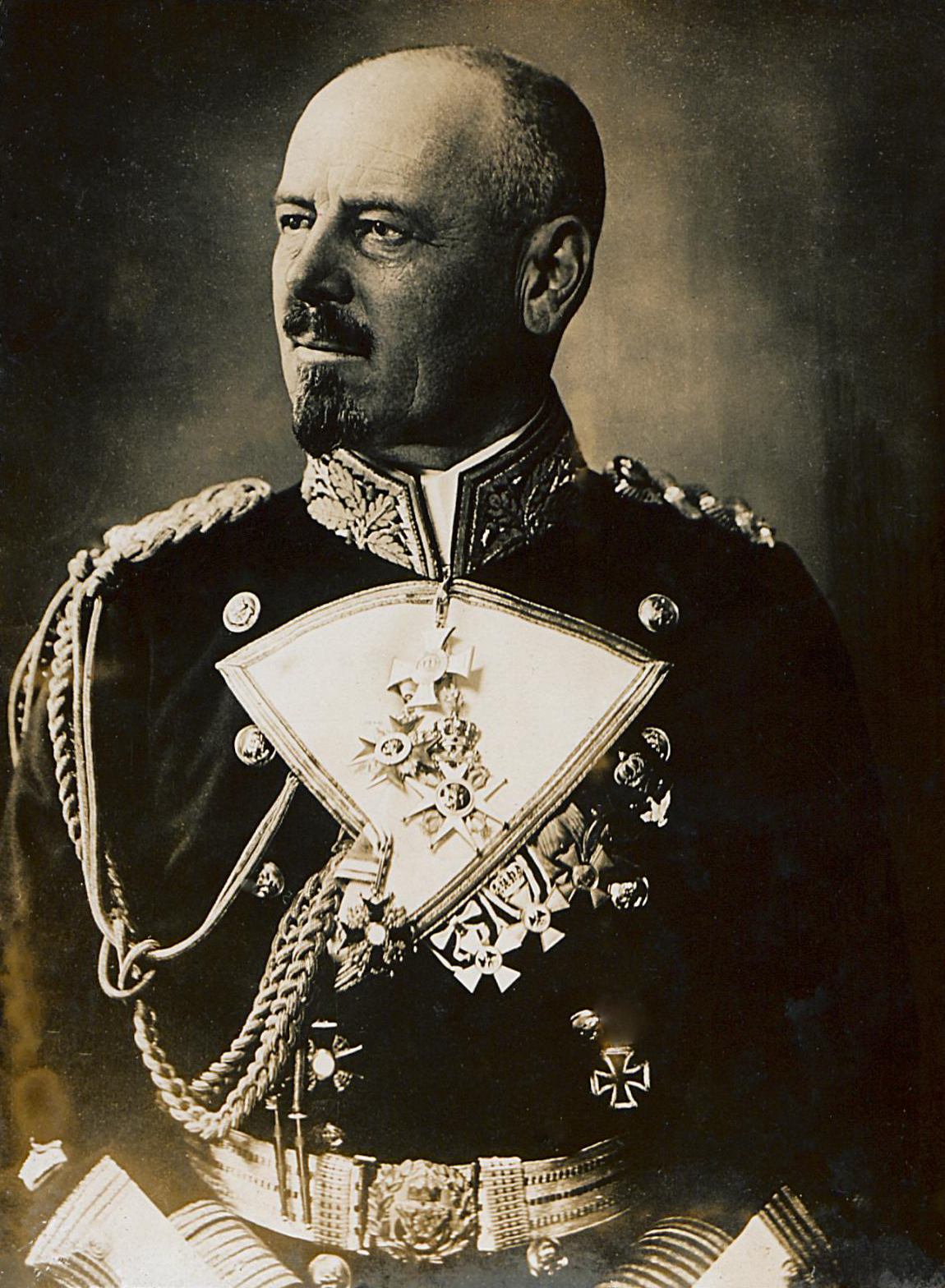
Franz Hipper, commander of the German battlecruiser squadron

The German scouting force, commanded by Franz Hipper, consisted of five battlecruisers, five light cruisers and 30 torpedo-boats. The Germans had no equivalent to Engadine and no heavier-than-air aircraft to operate with the fleet but had the Imperial German Naval Airship Service's force of rigid airships available to patrol the North Sea.

All of the battleships and battlecruisers on both sides carried torpedoes of various sizes, as did the lighter craft. The British battleships carried three or four underwater torpedo tubes. The battlecruisers carried from two to five. All were either 18-inch or 21-inch diameter. The German battleships carried five or six underwater torpedo tubes in three sizes from 18- to 21-inch, and the battlecruisers carried four or five tubes.The German battle fleet was hampered by the slow speed and relatively poor armament of the six pre-dreadnoughts of II Squadron, which limited maximum fleet speed to 18 knots (33 km/h; 21 mph), compared to maximum British fleet speed of 21 knots (39 km/h; 24 mph).On the British side, the eight armoured cruisers were deficient in both speed and armour protection.

== Battlecruiser action ==
The route of the British battlecruiser fleet took it through the patrol sector allocated to U-32. After receiving the order to commence the operation, the U-boat moved to a position 80 mi (70 nmi; 130 km) east of the Isle of May at dawn on 31 May. At 03:40, it sighted the cruisers HMS Galatea and Phaeton leaving the Forth at 18 knots (33 km/h; 21 mph). It launched one torpedo at the leading cruiser at a range of 1,000 yd (910 m), but its periscope jammed 'up', giving away the position of the submarine as it manoeuvred to fire a second. The lead cruiser turned away to dodge the torpedo, while the second turned towards the submarine, attempting to ram. U-32 crash dived, and on raising its periscope at 04:10 saw two battlecruisers (the 2nd Battlecruiser Squadron) heading south-east. They were too far away to attack, but Kapitänleutnant von Spiegel reported the sighting of two battleships and two cruisers to Germany.

U-66 was also supposed to be patrolling off the Firth of Forth but had been forced north to a position 60 mi (52 nmi; 97 km) off Peterhead by patrolling British vessels. This now brought it into contact with the 2nd Battle Squadron, coming from the Moray Firth. At 05:00, it had to crash dive when the cruiser Duke of Edinburgh appeared from the mist heading toward it. It was followed by another cruiser, Boadicea, and eight battleships. U-66 got within 350 yd (320 m) of the battleships preparing to fire, but was forced to dive by an approaching destroyer and missed the opportunity. At 06:35, it reported eight battleships and cruisers heading north.

The courses reported by both submarines were incorrect, because they reflected one leg of a zigzag being used by British ships to avoid submarines. Taken with a wireless intercept of more ships leaving Scapa Flow earlier in the night, they created the impression in the German High Command that the British fleet, whatever it was doing, was split into separate sections moving apart, which was precisely as the Germans wished to meet it.

Jellicoe's ships proceeded to their rendezvous undamaged and undiscovered. However, he was now misled by an Admiralty intelligence report advising that the German main battle fleet was still in port. The Director of Operations Division, Rear Admiral Thomas Jackson, had asked the intelligence division, Room 40, for the current location of German call sign DK, used by Admiral Scheer. They had replied that it was currently transmitting from Wilhelmshaven. It was known to the intelligence staff that Scheer deliberately used a different call sign when at sea, but no one asked for this information or explained the reason behind the query—to locate the German fleet.

The German battlecruisers cleared the minefields surrounding the Amrum swept channel by 09:00. They then proceeded north-west, passing 35 mi (30 nmi; 56 km) west of the Horn's Reef lightship heading for the Little Fisher Bank at the mouth of the Skagerrak. The High Seas Fleet followed some 50 mi (43 nmi; 80 km) behind. The battlecruisers were in line ahead, with the four cruisers of the II scouting group plus supporting torpedo boats ranged in an arc 8 mi (7.0 nmi; 13 km) ahead and to either side. The IX torpedo boat flotilla formed close support immediately surrounding the battlecruisers. The High Seas Fleet similarly adopted a line-ahead formation, with close screening by torpedo boats to either side and a further screen of five cruisers surrounding the column 5–8 mi (4.3–7.0 nmi; 8.0–12.9 km) away. The wind had finally moderated so that Zeppelins could be used, and by 11:30 five had been sent out: L14 to the Skagerrak, L23 240 mi (210 nmi; 390 km) east of Noss Head in the Pentland Firth, L21 120 mi (100 nmi; 190 km) off Peterhead, L9 100 mi (87 nmi; 160 km) off Sunderland, and L16 80 mi (70 nmi; 130 km) east of Flamborough Head. Visibility, however, was still bad, with clouds down to 1,000 ft (300 m).

=== Contact ===
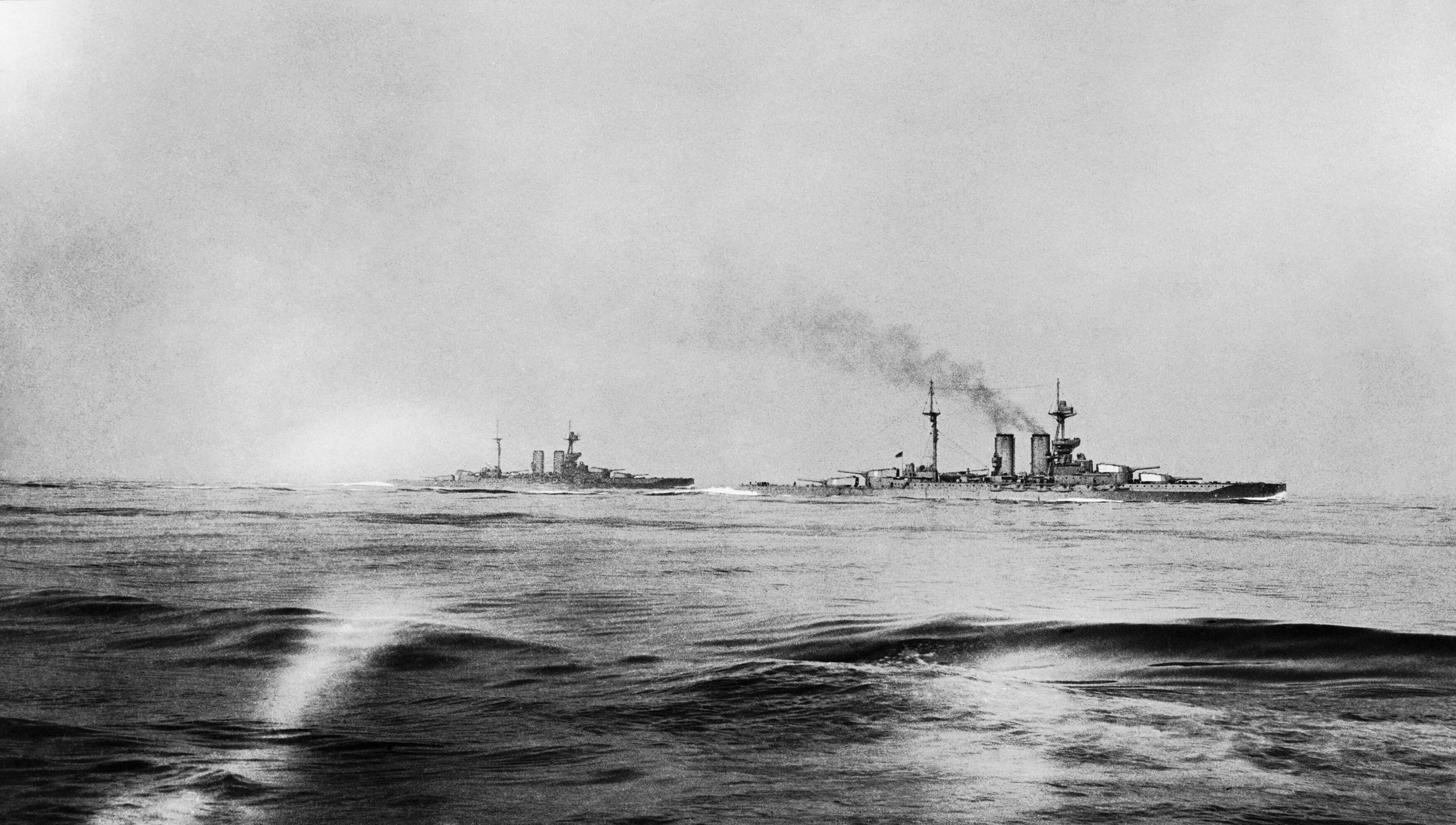
HMS Warspite and Malaya, seen from HMS Valiant at around 14:00 hrs

By around 14:00, Beatty's ships were proceeding eastward at roughly the same latitude as Hipper's squadron, which was heading north. Had the courses remained unchanged, Beatty would have passed between the two German fleets, 40 mi (35 nmi; 64 km) south of the battlecruisers and 20 mi (17 nmi; 32 km) north of the High Seas Fleet at around 16:30, possibly trapping his ships just as the German plan envisioned. His orders were to stop his scouting patrol when he reached a point 260 mi (230 nmi; 420 km) east of Britain and then turn north to meet Jellicoe, which he did at this time. Beatty's ships were divided into three columns, with the two battlecruiser squadrons leading in parallel lines 3 mi (2.6 nmi; 4.8 km) apart. The 5th Battle Squadron was stationed 5 mi (4.3 nmi; 8.0 km) to the north-west, on the side furthest away from any expected enemy contact, while a screen of cruisers and destroyers was spread south-east of the battlecruisers. After the turn, the 5th Battle Squadron was now leading the British ships in the westernmost column, and Beatty's squadron was centre and rearmost, with the 2nd BCS to the west.

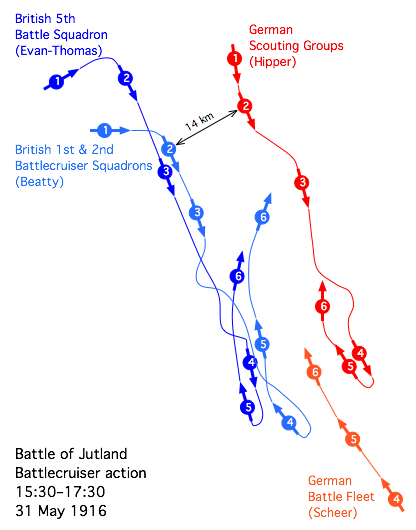
(1) 15:22 hrs, Hipper sights Beatty. (2) 15:48 hrs, First shots fired by Hipper's squadron. (3) 16:00 hrs-16:05 hrs, Indefatigable explodes, leaving two survivors. (4) 16:25 hrs, Queen Mary explodes, nine survive. (5) 16:45 hrs, Beatty's battlecruisers move out of range of Hipper. (6) 16:54 hrs, Evan-Thomas's battleships turn north behind Beatty.

At 14:20 on 31 May, despite heavy haze and scuds of fog giving poor visibility, scouts from Beatty's force reported enemy ships to the south-east; the British light units, investigating a neutral Danish steamer (N. J. Fjord), which was stopped between the two fleets, had found two German destroyers engaged on the same mission (B109 and B110). The first shots of the battle were fired at 14:28 when Galatea and Phaeton of the British 1st Light Cruiser Squadron opened on the German torpedo boats, which withdrew toward their approaching light cruisers. At 14:36, the Germans scored the first hit of the battle when SMS Elbing, of Rear-Admiral Friedrich Boedicker's Scouting Group II, hit her British counterpart Galatea at extreme range.

Beatty began to move his battlecruisers and supporting forces south-eastwards and then east to cut the German ships off from their base and ordered Engadine to launch a seaplane to try to get more information about the size and location of the German forces. This was the first time in history that a carrier-based aeroplane was used for reconnaissance in naval combat. Engadine's aircraft did locate and report some German light cruisers just before 15:30 and came under anti-aircraft gunfire but attempts to relay reports from the aeroplane failed.

Unfortunately for Beatty, his initial course changes at 14:32 were not received by Sir Hugh Evan-Thomas's 5th Battle Squadron (the distance being too great to read his flags), because the battlecruiser HMS Tiger—the last ship in his column—was no longer in a position where she could relay signals by searchlight to Evan-Thomas, as she had previously been ordered to do. Whereas before the north turn, Tiger had been the closest ship to Evan-Thomas, she was now further away than Beatty in Lion. Matters were aggravated because Evan-Thomas had not been briefed regarding standing orders within Beatty's squadron, as his squadron normally operated with the Grand Fleet. Fleet ships were expected to obey movement orders precisely and not deviate from them. Beatty's standing instructions expected his officers to use their initiative and keep station with the flagship. As a result, the four Queen Elizabeth-class battleships—which were the fastest and most heavily armed in the world at that time—remained on the previous course for several minutes, ending up 10 mi (8.7 nmi; 16 km) behind rather than five. Beatty also had the opportunity during the previous hours to concentrate his forces, and no reason not to do so, yet instead he steamed ahead at full speed, faster than the battleships could manage. Dividing the force had serious consequences for the British, costing them what would have been an overwhelming advantage in ships and firepower during the first half-hour of the coming battle.

With visibility favouring the Germans, Hipper's battlecruisers at 15:22, steaming approximately north-west, sighted Beatty's squadron at a range of about 15 mi (13 nmi; 24 km), while Beatty's forces did not identify Hipper's battlecruisers until 15:30 (position 1 on map). At 15:45, Hipper turned south-east to lead Beatty toward Scheer, who was 46 mi (40 nmi; 74 km) south-east with the main force of the High Seas Fleet.

=== Run to the south ===
Beatty's conduct during the next 15 minutes has received a great deal of criticism, as his ships out-ranged and outnumbered the German squadron, yet he held his fire for over 10 minutes with the German ships in range. He also failed to use the time available to rearrange his battlecruisers into a fighting formation, with the result that they were still manoeuvring when the battle started.

At 15:48, with the opposing forces roughly parallel at 15,000 yd (14,000 m), with the British to the south-west of the Germans (i.e., on the right side), Hipper opened fire, followed by the British ships as their guns came to bear upon targets (position 2). Thus began the opening phase of the battlecruiser action, known as the Run to the South, in which the British chased the Germans, and Hipper intentionally led Beatty toward Scheer. During the first minutes of the ensuing battle, all the British ships except Princess Royal fired far over their German opponents, due to adverse visibility conditions, before finally getting the range. Only Lion and Princess Royal had settled into formation, so the other four ships were hampered in aiming by their own turning. Beatty was to windward of Hipper, and therefore funnel and gun smoke from his own ships tended to obscure his targets, while Hipper's smoke blew clear. Also, the eastern sky was overcast and the grey German ships were indistinct and difficult to range.

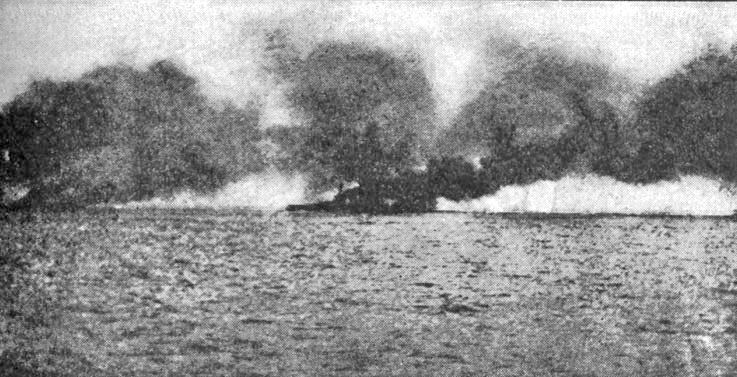
Beatty's flagship HMS Lion burning after being hit by a salvo from SMS Lützow

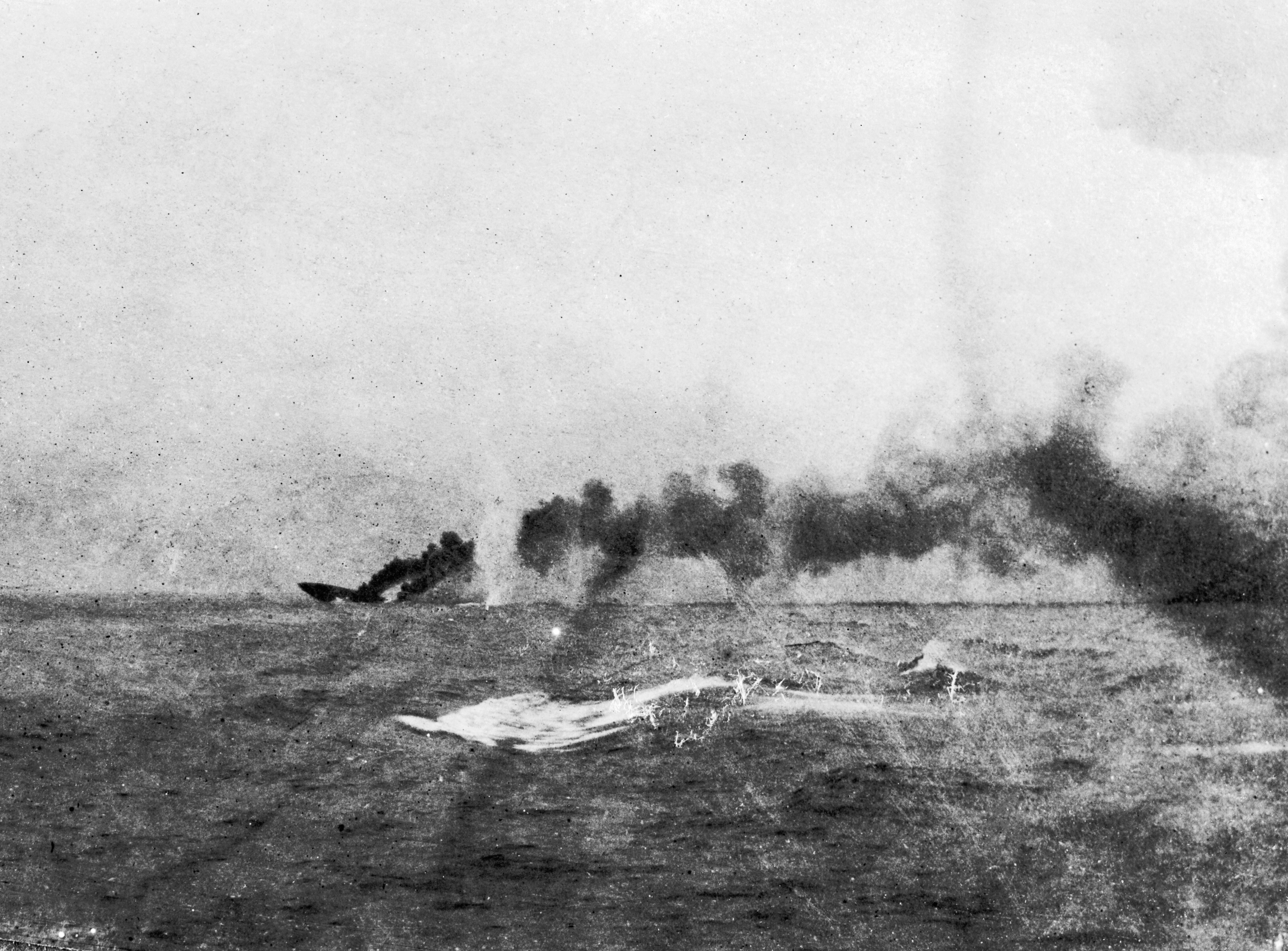
HMS Indefatigable sinking after being struck by shells from SMS Von der Tann

Beatty had ordered his ships to engage in a line, one British ship engaging with one German and his flagship HMS Lion doubling on the German flagship SMS Lützow. However, due to another mistake with signalling by flag, and possibly because Queen Mary and Tiger were unable to see the German lead ship because of smoke, the second German ship, Derfflinger, was left un-engaged and free to fire without disruption. SMS Moltke drew fire from two of Beatty's battlecruisers, but still fired with great accuracy during this time, hitting Tiger 9 times in the first 12 minutes. The Germans drew first blood. Aided by superior visibility, Hipper's five battlecruisers quickly registered hits on three of the six British battlecruisers. Seven minutes passed before the British managed to score their first hit.

The first near-kill of the Run to the South occurred at 16:00, when a 30.5 cm (12.0 in) shell from Lützow wrecked the "Q" turret amidships on Beatty's flagship Lion. Dozens of crewmen were instantly killed, but far larger destruction was averted when the mortally wounded turret commander—Major Francis Harvey of the Royal Marines—promptly ordered the magazine doors shut and the magazine flooded. This prevented a magazine explosion at 16:28, when a flash fire ignited ready cordite charges beneath the turret and killed everyone in the chambers outside "Q" magazine. Lion was saved. HMS Indefatigable was not so lucky; at 16:02, just 14 minutes into the gunnery exchange, she was hit aft by three 28 cm (11 in) shells from SMS Von der Tann, causing damage sufficient to knock her out of line and detonating "X" magazine aft. Soon after, despite the near-maximum range, Von der Tann put another 28 cm (11 in) shell on Indefatigable's "A" turret forward. The plunging shells probably pierced the thin upper armour, and seconds later Indefatigable was ripped apart by another magazine explosion, sinking immediately and leaving only two survivors from her crew of 1,019 officers and men. (position 3).

Hipper's position deteriorated somewhat by 16:15 as the 5th Battle Squadron finally came into range, so that he had to contend with gunfire from the four battleships astern as well as Beatty's five remaining battlecruisers to starboard. But he knew his baiting mission was close to completion, as his force was rapidly closing with Scheer's main body. At 16:08, the lead battleship of the 5th Battle Squadron, HMS Barham, caught up with Hipper and opened fire at extreme range, scoring a 15 in (380 mm) hit on Von der Tann within 60 seconds. Still, it was 16:15 before all the battleships of the 5th were able to fully engage at long range.

At 16:25, the battlecruiser action intensified again when HMS Queen Mary was hit by what may have been a combined salvo from Derfflinger and Seydlitz; she disintegrated when both forward magazines exploded, sinking with all but nine of her 1,275 man crew lost. (position 4). Commander von Hase, the first gunnery officer aboard Derfflinger, noted:

The enemy was shooting superbly. Twice the Derfflinger came under their infernal hail and each time she was hit. But the Queen Mary was having a bad time; engaged by the Seydlitz as well as the Derfflinger, she met her doom at 16:26. A vivid red flame shot up from her forepart; then came an explosion forward, followed by a much heavier explosion amidships. Immediately afterwards, she blew up with a terrific explosion, the masts collapsing inwards and the smoke hiding everything.

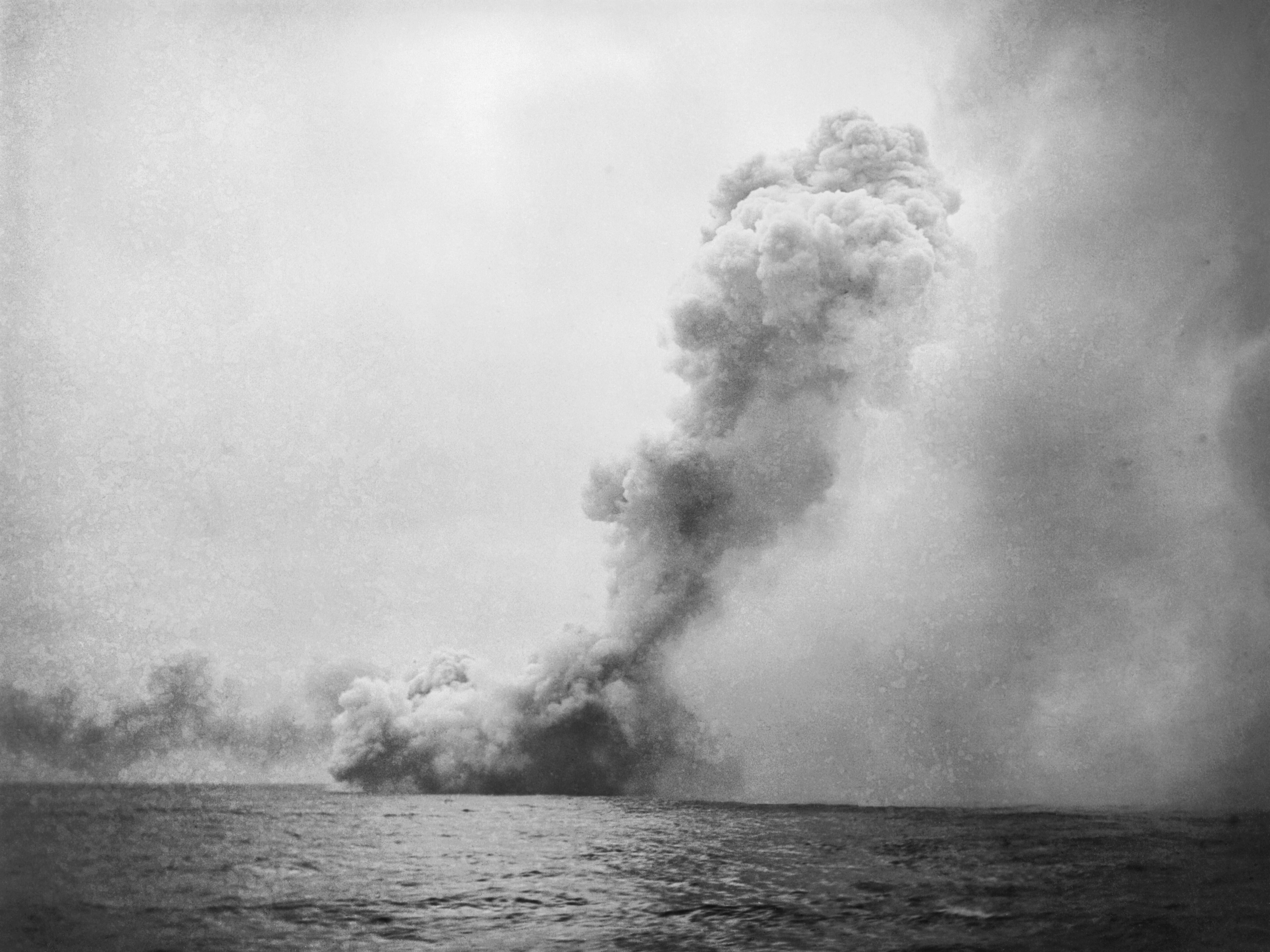
HMS Queen Mary blowing up

During the Run to the South, from 15:48 to 16:54, the German battlecruisers made an estimated total of forty-two 28 and 30.5 cm (11.0 and 12.0 in) hits on the British battlecruisers (nine on Lion, six on Princess Royal, seven on Queen Mary, 14 on Tiger, one on New Zealand, five on Indefatigable), and two more on the battleship Barham, compared with only eleven 13.5 in (340 mm) hits by the British battlecruisers (four on Lützow, four on Seydlitz, two on Moltke, one on von der Tann), and six 15 in (380 mm) hits by the battleships (one on Seydlitz, four on Moltke, one on von der Tann).

Shortly after 16:26, a salvo struck on or around HMS Princess Royal, which was obscured by spray and smoke from shell bursts. A signalman promptly leapt on to the bridge of Lion and announced "Princess Royal's blown up, Sir." Beatty famously turned to his flag captain, saying "Chatfield, there seems to be something wrong with our bloody ships today." (In popular legend, Beatty also immediately ordered his ships to "turn two points to port", i.e., two points nearer the enemy, but there is no official record of any such command or course change.) Princess Royal, as it turned out, was still afloat after the spray cleared.

At 16:30, Scheer's leading battleships sighted the distant battlecruiser action; soon after, HMS Southampton of Beatty's 2nd Light Cruiser Squadron led by Commodore William Goodenough sighted the main body of Scheer's High Seas Fleet, dodging numerous heavy-calibre salvos to report in detail the German strength: 16 dreadnoughts with six older battleships. This was the first news that Beatty and Jellicoe had that Scheer and his battle fleet were even at sea. Simultaneously, an all-out destroyer action raged in the space between the opposing battlecruiser forces, as British and German destroyers fought with each other and attempted to torpedo the larger enemy ships. Each side fired many torpedoes, but both battlecruiser forces turned away from the attacks and all escaped harm except Seydlitz, which was hit forward at 16:57 by a torpedo fired by the British destroyer HMS Petard. Though taking on water, Seydlitz maintained speed. The destroyer HMS Nestor, under the command of Captain Barry Bingham, led the British attacks. The British disabled the German torpedo boat V27, which the Germans soon abandoned and sank, and Petard then torpedoed and sank V29, her second score of the day. S35 and V26 rescued the crews of their sunken sister ships. But Nestor and another British destroyer—HMS Nomad—were immobilised by shell hits, and were later sunk by Scheer's passing dreadnoughts. Bingham was rescued, and awarded the Victoria Cross for his leadership in the destroyer action.

=== Run to the north ===
As soon as he himself sighted the vanguard of Scheer's distant battleship line 12 mi (10 nmi; 19 km) away, at 16:40, Beatty turned his battlecruiser force 180°, heading north to draw the Germans toward Jellicoe.(position 5). Beatty's withdrawal toward Jellicoe is called the "Run to the North", in which the tables turned and the Germans chased the British. Because Beatty once again failed to signal his intentions adequately, the battleships of the 5th Battle Squadron—which were too far behind to read his flags—found themselves passing the battlecruisers on an opposing course and heading directly toward the approaching main body of the High Seas Fleet. At 16:48, at extreme range, Scheer's leading battleships opened fire. Meanwhile, at 16:47, having received Goodenough's signal and knowing that Beatty was now leading the German battle fleet north to him, Jellicoe signalled to his own forces that the fleet action they had waited so long for was finally imminent; at 16:51, by radio, he informed the Admiralty so in London.

The difficulties of the 5th Battle Squadron were compounded when Beatty gave the order to Evan-Thomas to "turn in succession" (rather than "turn together") at 16:48 as the battleships passed him. Evan-Thomas acknowledged the signal, but Lieutenant-Commander Ralph Seymour, Beatty's flag lieutenant, aggravated the situation when he did not haul down the flags (to execute the signal) for some minutes. At 16:55, when the 5BS had moved within range of the enemy battleships, Evan-Thomas issued his own flag command warning his squadron to expect sudden manoeuvres and to follow his lead, before starting to turn on his own initiative. The order to turn in succession would have resulted in all four ships turning in the same patch of sea as they reached it one by one, giving the High Seas Fleet repeated opportunity with ample time to find the proper range. However, the captain of the trailing ship (HMS Malaya) turned early, mitigating the adverse results.

For the next hour, the 5th Battle Squadron acted as Beatty's rearguard, drawing fire from all the German ships within range, while by 17:10 Beatty had deliberately eased his own squadron out of range of Hipper's now-superior battlecruiser force. Since visibility and firepower now favoured the Germans, there was no incentive for Beatty to risk further battlecruiser losses when his own gunnery could not be effective. Illustrating the imbalance, Beatty's battlecruisers did not score any hits on the Germans in this phase until 17:45, but they had rapidly received five more before he opened the range (four on Lion, of which three were by Lützow, and one on Tiger by Seydlitz). Now the only targets the Germans could reach, the ships of the 5th Battle Squadron, received simultaneous fire from Hipper's battlecruisers to the east (which HMS Barham and Valiant engaged) and Scheer's leading battleships to the south-east (which HMS Warspite and Malaya engaged).Three took hits: Barham (four by Derfflinger), Warspite (two by Seydlitz), and Malaya (seven by the German battleships). Only Valiant was unscathed.

The four battleships were far better suited to take this sort of pounding than the battlecruisers, and none were lost, though Malaya suffered heavy damage, an ammunition fire, and heavy crew casualties. At the same time, the 15 in (380 mm) fire of the four British ships was accurate and effective. As the two British squadrons headed north at top speed, eagerly chased by the entire German fleet, the 5th Battle Squadron scored 13 hits on the enemy battlecruisers (four on Lützow, three on Derfflinger, six on Seydlitz) and five on battleships (although only one, on SMS Markgraf, did any serious damage). (position 6).

=== The fleets converge ===
Jellicoe was now aware that full fleet engagement was nearing, but had insufficient information on the position and course of the Germans. To assist Beatty, early in the battle at about 16:05, Jellicoe had ordered Rear-Admiral Horace Hood's 3rd Battlecruiser Squadron to speed ahead to find and support Beatty's force, and Hood was now racing SSE well in advance of Jellicoe's northern force. Rear-Admiral Arbuthnot's 1st Cruiser Squadron patrolled the van of Jellicoe's main battleship force as it advanced steadily to the south-east. At 17:33, the armoured cruiser HMS Black Prince of Arbuthnot's squadron, on the far southwest flank of Jellicoe's force, came within view of HMS Falmouth, which was about 5 mi (4.3 nmi; 8.0 km) ahead of Beatty with the 3rd Light Cruiser Squadron, establishing the first visual link between the converging bodies of the Grand Fleet. At 17:38, the scout cruiser HMS Chester, screening Hood's oncoming battlecruisers, was intercepted by the van of the German scouting forces under Rear-Admiral Boedicker.

Heavily outnumbered by Boedicker's four light cruisers, Chester was pounded before being relieved by Hood's heavy units, which swung westward for that purpose. Hood's flagship HMS Invincible disabled the light cruiser SMS Wiesbaden shortly after 17:56. Wiesbaden became a sitting target for most of the British fleet during the next hour, but remained afloat and fired some torpedoes at the passing enemy battleships from long range. Meanwhile, Boedicker's other ships turned toward Hipper and Scheer in the mistaken belief that Hood was leading a larger force of British capital ships from the north and east. A chaotic destroyer action in mist and smoke ensued as German torpedo boats attempted to blunt the arrival of this new formation, but Hood's battlecruisers dodged all the torpedoes fired at them. In this action, after leading a torpedo counter-attack, the British destroyer HMS Shark was disabled, but continued to return fire at numerous passing enemy ships for the next hour.

== Fleet action ==
=== Deployment ===
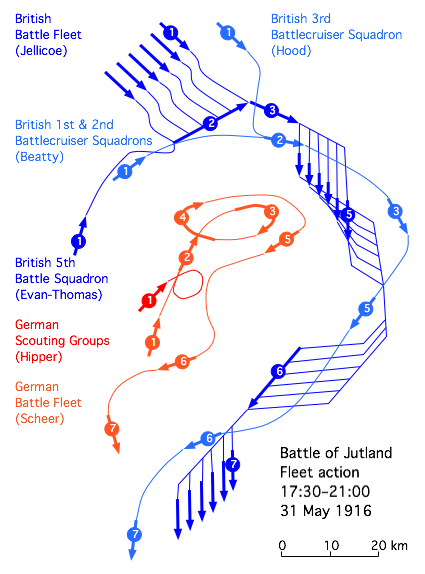
(1) 18:00 Scouting forces rejoin their respective fleets. (2) 18:15 British fleet deploys into battle line (3) 18:30 German fleet under fire turns away (4) 19:00 German fleet turns back (5) 19:15 German fleet turns away for second time (6) 20:00 (7) 21:00 Nightfall: Jellicoe assumes night cruising formation

In the meantime, Beatty and Evan-Thomas had resumed their engagement with Hipper's battlecruisers, this time with the visual conditions to their advantage. With several of his ships damaged, Hipper turned back toward Scheer at around 18:00, just as Beatty's flagship Lion was finally sighted from Jellicoe's flagship Iron Duke. Jellicoe twice demanded the latest position of the German battlefleet from Beatty, who could not see the German battleships and failed to respond to the question until 18:14. Meanwhile, Jellicoe received confused sighting reports of varying accuracy and limited usefulness from light cruisers and battleships on the starboard (southern) flank of his force.

Jellicoe was in a worrying position. He needed to know the location of the German fleet to judge when and how to deploy his battleships from their cruising formation (six columns of four ships each) into a single battle line. The deployment could be on either the westernmost or the easternmost column, and had to be carried out before the Germans arrived; but early deployment could mean losing any chance of a decisive encounter. Deploying to the west would bring his fleet closer to Scheer, gaining valuable time as dusk approached, but the Germans might arrive before the manoeuvre was complete. Deploying to the east would take the force away from Scheer, but Jellicoe's ships might be able to cross the "T", and visibility would strongly favour British gunnery—Scheer's forces would be silhouetted against the setting sun to the west, while the Grand Fleet would be indistinct against the dark skies to the north and east, and would be hidden by reflection of the low sunlight off intervening haze and smoke. Deployment would take twenty irreplaceable minutes, and the fleets were closing at full speed. In one of the most critical and difficult tactical command decisions of the entire war, Jellicoe ordered deployment to the east at 18:15.

=== Windy Corner ===
Meanwhile, Hipper had rejoined Scheer, and the combined High Seas Fleet was heading north, directly toward Jellicoe. Scheer had no indication that Jellicoe was at sea, let alone that he was bearing down from the north-west, and was distracted by the intervention of Hood's ships to his north and east. Beatty's four surviving battlecruisers were now crossing the van of the British dreadnoughts to join Hood's three battlecruisers; at this time, Arbuthnot's flagship, the armoured cruiser HMS Defence, and her squadron-mate HMS Warrior both charged across Beatty's bows, and Lion narrowly avoided a collision with Warrior. Nearby, numerous British light cruisers and destroyers on the south-western flank of the deploying battleships were also crossing each other's courses in attempts to reach their proper stations, often barely escaping collisions, and under fire from some of the approaching German ships. This period of peril and heavy traffic attending the merger and deployment of the British forces later became known as "Windy Corner".

Arbuthnot was attracted by the drifting hull of the crippled Wiesbaden. With Warrior, Defence closed in for the kill, only to blunder right into the gun sights of Hipper's and Scheer's oncoming capital ships. Defence was deluged by heavy-calibre gunfire from many German battleships, which detonated her magazines in a spectacular explosion viewed by most of the deploying Grand Fleet. She sank with all hands (903 officers and men, including Arbuthnot and her captain Stanley Venn Ellis). Warrior was also hit badly, but was spared destruction by a mishap to the nearby battleship Warspite. Warspite had her steering gear overheat and jam under heavy load at high speed as the 5th Battle Squadron made a turn to the north at 18:19. Steaming at top speed in wide circles, Warspite attracted the attention of German dreadnoughts and took 13 hits, inadvertently drawing fire away from the hapless Warrior. Warspite was brought back under control and survived the onslaught, but was badly damaged, had to reduce speed, and withdrew northward; later (at 21:07), she was ordered back to port by Evan-Thomas. Warspite went on to a long and illustrious career, serving also in World War II. Warrior, on the other hand, was abandoned and sank the next day after her crew was taken off at 08:25 on 1 June by Engadine, which towed the sinking armoured cruiser 100 mi (87 nmi; 160 km) during the night.

Invincible blowing up after being struck by shells from Lützow and Derfflinger

As Defence sank and Warspite circled, at about 18:19, Hipper moved within range of Hood's 3rd Battlecruiser Squadron, but was still also within range of Beatty's ships. At first, visibility favoured the British: HMS Indomitable hit Derfflinger three times and Seydlitz once, while Lützow quickly took 10 hits from Lion, Inflexible and Invincible, including two below-waterline hits forward by Invincible that would ultimately doom Hipper's flagship. But at 18:30, Invincible abruptly appeared as a clear target before Lützow and Derfflinger. The two German ships then fired three salvoes each at Invincible, and sank her in 90 seconds. A 30.5 cm (12.0 in) shell from the third salvo struck Invincible's Q-turret amidships, detonating the magazines below and causing her to blow up and sink. All but six of her crew of 1,032 officers and men, including Rear-Admiral Hood, were killed. Of the remaining British battlecruisers, only Princess Royal received heavy-calibre hits at this time (two 30.5 cm (12.0 in) by the battleship Markgraf). Lützow, flooding forward and unable to communicate by radio, was now out of action and began to attempt to withdraw; therefore Hipper left his flagship and transferred to the torpedo boat SMS G39, hoping to board one of the other battlecruisers later.

=== Crossing the T ===
By 18:30, the main battle fleet action was joined for the first time, with Jellicoe effectively "crossing Scheer's T". The officers on the lead German battleships, and Scheer himself, were taken completely by surprise when they emerged from drifting clouds of smoky mist to suddenly find themselves facing the massed firepower of the entire Grand Fleet main battle line, which they did not know was even at sea. Jellicoe's flagship Iron Duke quickly scored seven hits on the lead German dreadnought, SMS König, but in this brief exchange, which lasted only minutes, as few as 10 of the Grand Fleet's 24 dreadnoughts actually opened fire. The Germans were hampered by poor visibility, in addition to being in an unfavourable tactical position, just as Jellicoe had intended. Realising he was heading into a death trap, Scheer ordered his fleet to turn and disengage at 18:33. Under a pall of smoke and mist, Scheer's forces succeeded in disengaging by an expertly executed 180° turn in unison ("battle about turn to starboard", German: Gefechtskehrtwendung nach Steuerbord), which was a well-practised emergency manoeuvre of the High Seas Fleet. Scheer declared:

Es war nun offensichtlich, dass wir es mit einem großen Teil der englischen Flotte zu tun hatten.Der gesamte Bogen, der sich von Norden nach Osten erstreckte, war ein Feuermeer. Das Aufleuchten des Mündungsfeuers war durch den Nebel und den Rauch am Horizont deutlich zu sehen, obwohl die Schiffe selbst nicht zu erkennen waren.

[It was now obvious that we were confronted by a large portion of the English fleet. The entire arc stretching from north to east was a sea of fire. The flash from the muzzles of the guns was seen distinctly through the mist and smoke on the horizon, although the ships themselves were not distinguishable.]

— (Massie 2003, p. 621)

Conscious of the risks to his capital ships posed by torpedoes, Jellicoe did not chase directly but headed south, determined to keep the High Seas Fleet west of him. Starting at 18:40, battleships at the rear of Jellicoe's line were in fact sighting and avoiding torpedoes, and at 18:54 HMS Marlborough was hit by a torpedo (probably from the disabled Wiesbaden), which reduced her speed to 16 knots (30 km/h; 18 mph). Meanwhile, Scheer, knowing that it was not yet dark enough to escape and that his fleet would suffer terribly in a stern chase, doubled back to the east at 18:55. In his memoirs he wrote, "the manoeuvre would be bound to surprise the enemy, to upset his plans for the rest of the day, and if the blow fell heavily it would facilitate the breaking loose at night." But the turn to the east took his ships, again, directly towards Jellicoe's fully deployed battle line. Simultaneously, the disabled British destroyer HMS Shark fought desperately against a group of four German torpedo boats and disabled V48 with gunfire, but was eventually torpedoed and sunk at 19:02 by the German destroyer S54. Shark's captain, Commander Loftus Jones was awarded the Victoria Cross for his heroism in continuing to fight against all odds.

=== Death Ride ===
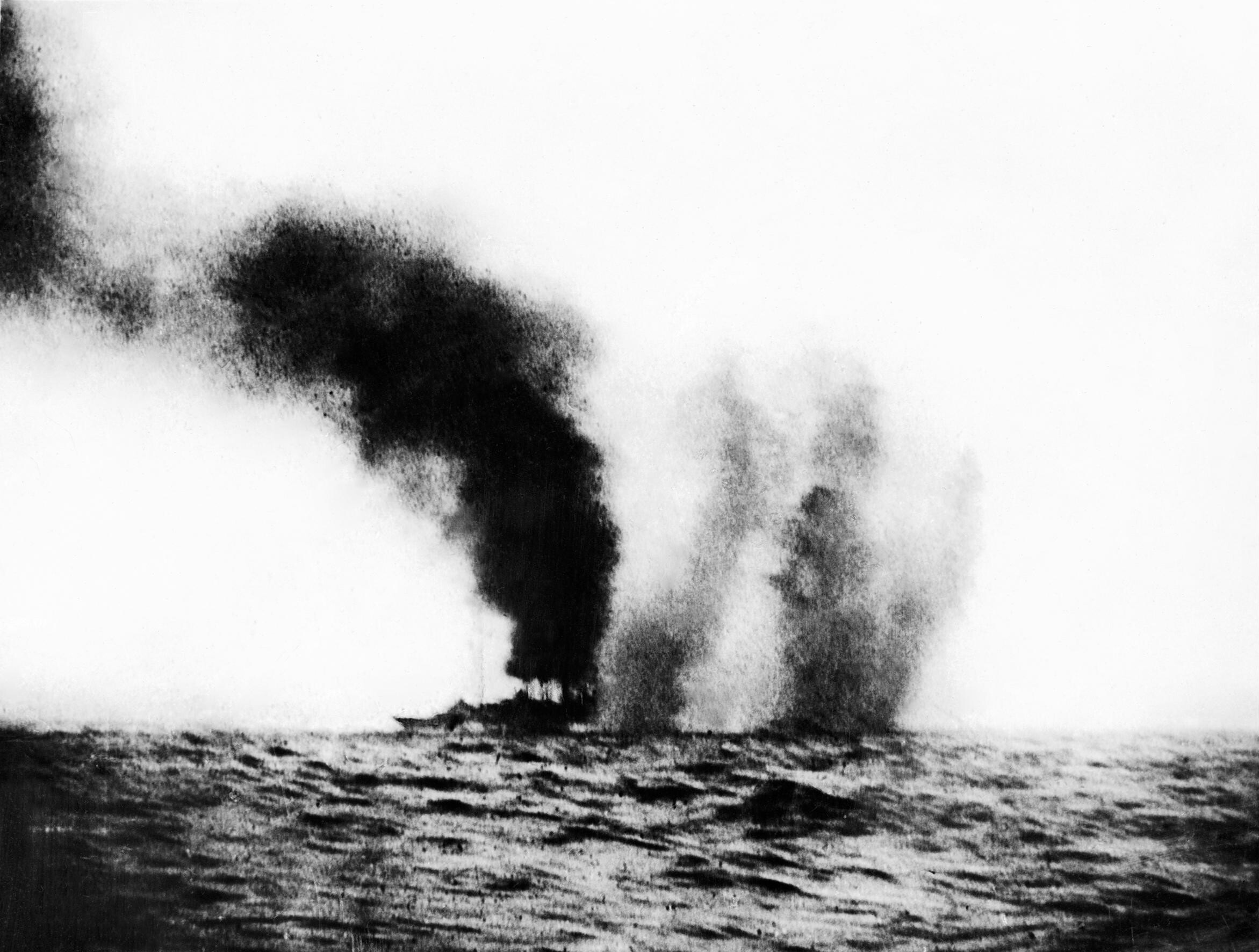
HMS Birmingham under fire

Commodore Goodenough's 2nd Light Cruiser Squadron dodged the fire of German battleships for a second time to re-establish contact with the High Seas Fleet shortly after 19:00. By 19:15, Jellicoe had crossed Scheer's "T" again. This time his arc of fire was tighter and deadlier, causing severe damage to the German battleships, particularly Rear-Admiral Behncke's leading 3rd Squadron (SMS König, Grosser Kurfürst, Markgraf, and Kaiser all being hit, along with SMS Helgoland of the 1st Squadron), while on the British side, only the battleship HMS Colossus was hit (twice, by Seydlitz but with little damage done).

At 19:17, for the second time in less than an hour, Scheer turned his outnumbered and out-gunned fleet to the west using the "battle about turn" (German: Gefechtskehrtwendung), but this time it was executed only with difficulty, as the High Seas Fleet's lead squadrons began to lose formation under concentrated gunfire. To deter a British chase, Scheer ordered a major torpedo attack by his destroyers and a potentially sacrificial charge by Scouting Group I's four remaining battlecruisers. Hipper was still aboard the torpedo boat G39 and was unable to command his squadron for this attack. Therefore, Derfflinger, under Captain Hartog, led the already badly damaged German battlecruisers directly into "the greatest concentration of naval gunfire any fleet commander had ever faced", at ranges down to 4 mi (3.5 nmi; 6.4 km).

In what became known as the "death ride", all the battlecruisers except Moltke were hit and further damaged, as 18 of the British battleships fired at them simultaneously. Derfflinger had two main gun turrets destroyed. The crews of Scouting Group I suffered heavy casualties, but the ships survived the pounding and veered away once Scheer was out of trouble and the German destroyers were moving in to attack. In this brief but intense portion of the engagement, from about 19:05 to about 19:30, the Germans sustained a total of 37 heavy hits while inflicting only two; Derfflinger alone received 14.

While his battlecruisers drew the fire of the British fleet, Scheer slipped away, laying smoke screens. Meanwhile, from about 19:16 to about 19:40, the British battleships were also engaging Scheer's torpedo boats, which executed several waves of torpedo attacks to cover his withdrawal. Jellicoe's ships turned away from the attacks and successfully evaded all 31 of the torpedoes launched at them—though, in several cases, only barely—and sank the German destroyer S35, attributed to a salvo from Iron Duke. British light forces also sank V48, which had previously been disabled by HMS Shark. This action, and the turn away, cost the British critical time and range in the last hour of daylight—as Scheer intended, allowing him to get his heavy ships out of immediate danger.

The last major exchanges between capital ships in this battle—and in the war—took place just after sunset, from about 20:19 to about 20:35, as the surviving British battlecruisers caught up with their German counterparts, which were briefly relieved by Rear-Admiral Mauve's obsolete pre-dreadnoughts (the German 2nd Squadron). The British received one heavy hit on Princess Royal but scored five more on Seydlitz and three on other German ships.

== Night action and German withdrawal ==
At 21:00, Jellicoe, conscious of the Grand Fleet's deficiencies in night fighting, decided to try to avoid a major engagement until early dawn. He placed a screen of cruisers and destroyers 5 mi (4.3 nmi; 8.0 km) behind his battle fleet to patrol the rear as he headed south to guard Scheer's expected escape route. In reality, Scheer opted to cross Jellicoe's wake and escape via Horns Reef. Luckily for Scheer, most of the light forces in Jellicoe's rearguard failed to report the seven separate encounters with the German fleet during the night; the very few radio reports that were sent to the British flagship were never received, possibly because the Germans were jamming British frequencies. Many of the destroyers failed to make the most of their opportunities to attack discovered ships, despite Jellicoe's expectations that the destroyer forces would, if necessary, be able to block the path of the German fleet.

Jellicoe and his commanders did not understand that the furious gunfire and explosions to the north (seen and heard for hours by all the British battleships) indicated that the German heavy ships were breaking through the screen astern of the British fleet. Instead, it was believed that the fighting was the result of night attacks by German destroyers. The most powerful British ships of all (the 15-inch-guns of the 5th Battle Squadron) directly observed German battleships crossing astern of them in action with British light forces, at ranges of 3 mi (2.6 nmi; 4.8 km) or less, and gunners on HMS Malaya made ready to fire, but her captain declined,deferring to the authority of Rear-Admiral Evan-Thomas—and neither commander reported the sightings to Jellicoe, assuming that he could see for himself and that revealing the fleet's position by radio signals or gunfire was unwise.

While the nature of Scheer's escape, and Jellicoe's inaction, indicate the overall German superiority in night fighting, the results of the night action were no more clear-cut than were those of the battle as a whole. In the first of many surprise encounters by darkened ships at point-blank range, Southampton, Commodore Goodenough's flagship, which had scouted so proficiently, was heavily damaged in action with a German Scouting Group composed of light cruisers, but managed to torpedo SMS Frauenlob, which went down at 22:23 with all but 9 hands (320 officers and men).

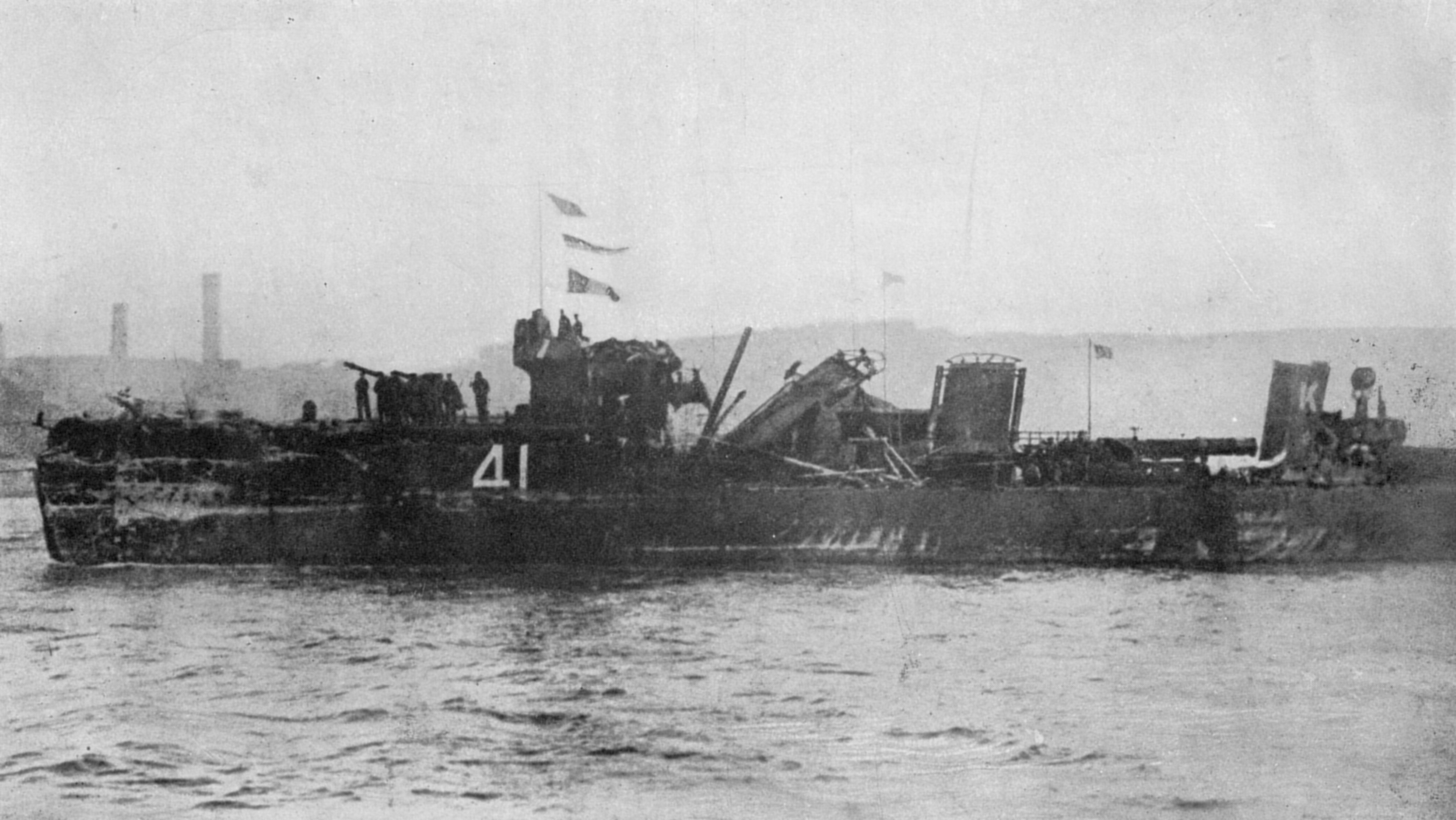
Damage to HMS Spitfire after being rammed by SMS Nassau.

From 23:20 to approximately 02:15, several British destroyer flotillas launched torpedo attacks on the German battle fleet in a series of violent and chaotic engagements at extremely short range (often under 0.5 mi (0.80 km)). At the cost of five destroyers sunk and some others damaged, they managed to torpedo the light cruiser SMS Rostock, which sank several hours later, and the pre-dreadnought SMS Pommern, which blew up and sank with all hands (839 officers and men) at 03:10 during the last wave of attacks before dawn. Three of the British destroyers collided in the chaos, and the German battleship SMS Nassau rammed the British destroyer HMS Spitfire, blowing away most of the British ship's superstructure merely with the muzzle blast of its big guns, which could not be aimed low enough to hit the ship. Nassau was left with an 11 ft (3.4 m) hole in her side, reducing her maximum speed to 15 knots (28 km/h; 17 mph), while the removed plating was left lying on Spitfire's deck. Spitfire survived and made it back to port. Another German cruiser, Elbing, was accidentally rammed by the dreadnought Posen and abandoned, sinking early the next day. Of the British destroyers, HMS Tipperary, Ardent, Fortune, Sparrowhawk and Turbulent were lost during the night fighting.

Just after midnight on 1 June, SMS Thüringen and other German battleships sank Black Prince of the ill-fated 1st Cruiser Squadron, which had blundered into the German battle line. Deployed as part of a screening force several miles ahead of the main force of the Grand Fleet, Black Prince had lost contact in the darkness and took a position near what she thought was the British line. The Germans soon identified the new addition to their line and opened fire. Overwhelmed by point-blank gunfire, Black Prince blew up (all 857 officers and men were lost), as her squadron leader Defence had done hours earlier. Lost in the darkness, the battlecruisers Moltke and Seydlitz had similar point-blank encounters with the British battle line and were recognised, but were spared the fate of Black Prince when the captains of the British ships, again, declined to open fire, reluctant to reveal their fleet's position.

At 01:45, the sinking battlecruiser Lützow – fatally damaged by Invincible during the main action – was torpedoed by the destroyer G38 on orders of Lützow's Captain Viktor von Harder after the surviving crew of 1,150 transferred to destroyers that came alongside. At 02:15, the German torpedo boat V4 suddenly had its bow blown off; V2 and V6 came alongside and took off the remaining crew, and the V2 then sank the hulk. Since there was no enemy nearby, it was assumed that she had hit a mine or had been torpedoed by a submarine. At 02:15, five British ships of the 13th Destroyer Flotilla under Captain James Uchtred Farie regrouped and headed south. At 02:25, they sighted the rear of the German line. HMS Marksman inquired of the leader Champion as to whether he thought they were British or German ships. Answering that he thought they were German, Farie then veered off to the east and away from the German line. All but Moresby in the rear followed, as through the gloom she sighted what she thought were four pre-dreadnought battleships 2 mi (1.7 nmi; 3.2 km) away. She hoisted a flag signal indicating that the enemy was to the west and then closed to firing range, letting off a torpedo set for high running at 02:37, then veering off to rejoin her flotilla. The four pre-dreadnought battleships were in fact two pre-dreadnoughts, Schleswig-Holstein and Schlesien, and the battlecruisers Von der Tann and Derfflinger. Von der Tann sighted the torpedo and was forced to steer sharply to starboard to avoid it as it passed close to her bows. Moresby rejoined Champion convinced she had scored a hit.

Finally, at 05:20, as Scheer's fleet was safely on its way home, the battleship SMS Ostfriesland struck a British mine on her starboard side, killing one man and wounding ten, but was able to make port. Seydlitz, critically damaged and very nearly sinking, barely survived the return voyage: after grounding and taking on even more water on the evening of 1 June, she had to be assisted stern first into port, where she dropped anchor at 07:30 on the morning of 2 June.

The Germans were helped in their escape by the failure of the British Admiralty in London to pass on seven critical radio intercepts obtained by naval intelligence indicating the true position, course and intentions of the High Seas Fleet during the night. One message was transmitted to Jellicoe at 23:15 that accurately reported the German fleet's course and speed as of 21:14. However, the erroneous signal from earlier in the day that reported the German fleet still in port, and an intelligence signal received at 22:45 giving another unlikely position for the German fleet, had reduced his confidence in intelligence reports. Had the other messages been forwarded, which confirmed the information received at 23:15, or had British ships reported accurately sightings and engagements with German destroyers, cruisers and battleships, then Jellicoe could have altered course to intercept Scheer at the Horns Reef. The unsent intercepted messages had been duly filed by the junior officer left on duty that night, who failed to appreciate their significance. By the time Jellicoe finally learned of Scheer's whereabouts at 04:15, the German fleet was too far away to catch and it was clear that the battle could no longer be resumed.

== Outcome ==
As both the Grand Fleet and the High Seas Fleet could claim to have at least partially satisfied their objectives, both Britain and Germany have at various points claimed victory in the Battle of Jutland. There is no consensus over which nation was victorious, or if there was a victor at all.

=== Reporting ===
At midday on 2 June, German authorities released a press statement claiming a victory, including the destruction of a battleship, two battlecruisers, two armoured cruisers, a light cruiser, a submarine and several destroyers, for the loss of Pommern and Wiesbaden. News that Lützow, Elbing and Rostock had been scuttled was withheld, on the grounds this information would not be known to the enemy. The victory of the Skagerrak was celebrated in the press, children were given a holiday and the nation celebrated. The Kaiser announced a new chapter in world history. After the war, the official German history hailed the battle as a victory, and it continued to be celebrated until after the Second World War.

In Britain, the first official news came from German wireless broadcasts. Ships began to arrive in port, their crews sending messages to friends and relatives both of their survival and the loss of some 6,000 others. The authorities considered suppressing the news, but it had already spread widely. Some crews coming ashore found rumours had already reported them dead to relatives, while others were jeered for the defeat they had suffered. At 19:00 on 2 June, the Admiralty released a statement based on information from Jellicoe containing the bare news of losses on each side. The following day British newspapers reported a German victory. The Daily Mirror described the German Director of the Naval Department telling the Reichstag: "The result of the fighting is a significant success for our forces against a much stronger adversary". The British population was shocked that the long-anticipated battle had been a victory for Germany. On 3 June, the Admiralty issued a further statement expanding on German losses, and another the following day with exaggerated claims. However, on 7 June the German admission of the losses of Lützow and Rostock started to redress the sense of the battle as a loss. International perception of the battle began to change towards a qualified British victory, the German attempt to change the balance of power in the North Sea having been repulsed. In July, bad news from the Somme campaign swept concern over Jutland from the British consciousness.

=== Assessments ===
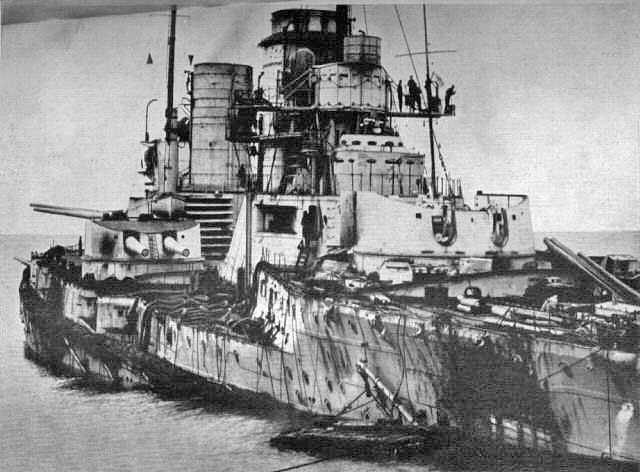
SMS Seydlitz was heavily damaged in the battle, hit by twenty-one main-calibre shells, several secondary-calibre and one torpedo. 98 men were killed and 55 injured.

At Jutland, the Germans, with a 99-strong fleet, sank 115,000 long tons (117,000 t) of British ships, while a 151-strong British fleet sank 62,000 long tons (63,000 t) of German ships. The British lost 6,094 seamen; the Germans 2,551. Several other ships were badly damaged, such as Lion and Seydlitz.

As of the summer of 1916, the High Seas Fleet's strategy was to whittle away the numerical advantage of the Royal Navy by bringing its full strength to bear against isolated squadrons of enemy capital ships whilst declining to be drawn into a general fleet battle until it had achieved something resembling parity in heavy ships. In tactical terms, the High Seas Fleet had clearly inflicted significantly greater losses on the Grand Fleet than it had suffered itself at Jutland, and the Germans never had any intention of attempting to hold the site of the battle, so some historians support the German claim of victory at Jutland. The Germans declared a great victory immediately afterwards, while the British by contrast had only reported short and simple results. In response to public outrage, the First Lord of the Admiralty Arthur Balfour asked Winston Churchill to write a second report that was more positive and detailed.

However, Scheer seems to have quickly realised that further battles with a similar rate of attrition would exhaust the High Seas Fleet long before they reduced the Grand Fleet. Further, after the 19 August advance was nearly intercepted by the Grand Fleet, he no longer believed that it would be possible to trap a single squadron of Royal Navy warships without having the Grand Fleet intervene before he could return to port. Therefore, the High Seas Fleet abandoned its forays into the North Sea and turned its attention to the Baltic for most of 1917 whilst Scheer switched tactics against Britain to unrestricted submarine warfare in the Atlantic.

At a strategic level, the outcome has been the subject of a huge amount of literature with no clear consensus. The battle was widely viewed as indecisive in the immediate aftermath, and this view remains influential.

Despite numerical superiority, the British had been disappointed in their hopes for a decisive battle comparable to Trafalgar and the objective of the influential strategic doctrines of Alfred Mahan. The High Seas Fleet survived as a fleet in being. Most of its losses were made good within a month—even Seydlitz, the most badly damaged ship to survive the battle, was repaired by October and officially back in service by November. However, the Germans had failed in their objective of destroying a substantial portion of the British Fleet, and no progress had been made towards the goal of allowing the High Seas Fleet to operate in the Atlantic Ocean.

Subsequently, there has been considerable support for the view of Jutland as a strategic victory for the British. While the British had not destroyed the German fleet and had lost more ships and lives than their enemy, the Germans had retreated to harbour; at the end of the battle, the British were in command of the area. Britain enforced the blockade, reducing Germany's vital imports to 55%, affecting the ability of Germany to fight the war.

The German fleet would sortie into the North Sea only thrice more, with a raid on 19 August, one in October 1916, and another in April 1918. All three were unopposed by capital ships and quickly aborted as neither side was prepared to take the risks of mines and submarines.

Apart from these three abortive operations the High Seas Fleet—unwilling to risk another encounter with the British fleet—confined its activities to the Baltic Sea for the remainder of the war. Jellicoe issued an order prohibiting the Grand Fleet from steaming south of the line of Horns Reef owing to the threat of mines and U-boats. A German naval expert, writing publicly about Jutland in November 1918, commented, "Our Fleet losses were severe. On 1 June 1916, it was clear to every thinking person that this battle must, and would be, the last one".

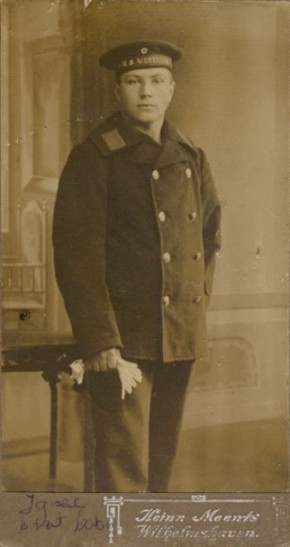
A crew member of SMS Westfalen

At the end of the battle, the British had maintained their numerical superiority and had 23 dreadnoughts ready and four battlecruisers still able to fight, while the Germans had only 10 dreadnoughts. One month after the battle, the Grand Fleet was stronger than it had been before sailing to Jutland.Warspite was dry-docked at Rosyth, returning to the fleet on 22 July, while Malaya was repaired in the floating dock at Invergordon, returning to duty on 11 July. Barham was docked for a month at Devonport before undergoing speed trials and returning to Scapa Flow on 8 July. Princess Royal stayed initially at Rosyth but transferred to dry dock at Portsmouth before returning to duty at Rosyth 21 July. Tiger was dry-docked at Rosyth and ready for service 2 July. Queen Elizabeth, Emperor of India and HMAS Australia, which had been undergoing maintenance at the time of the battle, returned to the fleet immediately, followed shortly after by Resolution and Ramillies. Lion initially remained ready for sea duty despite the damaged turret, then underwent a month's repairs in July when Q turret was removed temporarily and replaced in September.

A third view, presented in a number of recent evaluations, is that Jutland, the last major fleet action between battleships, illustrated the irrelevance of battleship fleets following the development of the submarine, mine and torpedo. In this view, the most important consequence of Jutland was the decision of the Germans to engage in unrestricted submarine warfare. Although large numbers of battleships were constructed in the decades between the wars, it has been argued that this outcome reflected the social dominance among naval decision-makers of battleship advocates who constrained technological choices to fit traditional paradigms of fleet action. Battleships played a relatively minor role in World War II, in which the submarine and aircraft carrier emerged as the dominant offensive weapons of naval warfare.

=== British self-critique ===
The official British Admiralty examination of the Grand Fleet's performance recognised two main problems:

- British armour-piercing shells exploded outside the German armour rather than penetrating and exploding within. As a result, some German ships with only 8 in (20 cm)-thick armour survived hits from 15-inch (38 cm) projectiles. Had these shells penetrated the armour and then exploded, German losses would probably have been far greater.
- Communication between ships and the British commander-in-chief was comparatively poor. For most of the battle, Jellicoe had no idea where the German ships were, even though British ships were in contact. They failed to report enemy positions, contrary to the Grand Fleet's Battle Plan. Some of the most important signalling was carried out solely by flag instead of wireless or using redundant methods to ensure communications—a questionable procedure, given the mixture of haze and smoke that obscured the battlefield, and a foreshadowing of similar failures by habit-bound and conservatively minded professional officers of rank to take advantage of new technology in World War II.

==== Shell performance ====
German armour-piercing shells were far more effective than the British ones, which often failed to penetrate heavy armour. The issue particularly concerned shells striking at oblique angles, which became increasingly the case at long range. Germany had adopted trinitrotoluene (TNT) as the explosive filler for artillery shells in 1902, while the United Kingdom was still using a picric acid mixture (Lyddite). The shock of impact of a shell against armour often prematurely detonated Lyddite in advance of fuze function while TNT detonation could be delayed until after the shell had penetrated and the fuze had functioned in the vulnerable area behind the armour plate. Some 17 British shells hit the side armour of the German dreadnoughts or battlecruisers. Of these, four would not have penetrated under any circumstances. Of the remaining 13, one penetrated the armour and exploded inside. This showed a 7.5% chance of proper shell function on the British side, a result of overly brittle shells and Lyddite exploding too soon.

The issue of poorly performing shells had been known to Jellicoe, who as Third Sea Lord from 1908 to 1910 had ordered new shells to be designed. However, the matter had not been followed through after his posting to sea and new shells had never been thoroughly tested. Beatty discovered the problem at a party aboard Lion a short time after the battle, when a Swedish Naval officer was present. He had recently visited Berlin, where the German navy had scoffed at how British shells had broken up on their ships' armour. The question of shell effectiveness had also been raised after the Battle of Dogger Bank, but no action had been taken. Hipper later commented, "It was nothing but the poor quality of their bursting charges which saved us from disaster."

Admiral Dreyer, writing later about the battle, during which he had been captain of the British flagship Iron Duke, estimated that effective shells as later introduced would have led to the sinking of six more German capital ships, based upon the actual number of hits achieved in the battle. The system of testing shells, which remained in use up to 1944, meant that, statistically, a batch of shells of which 70% were faulty stood an even chance of being accepted. Indeed, even shells that failed this relatively mild test had still been issued to ships. Analysis of the test results afterwards by the Ordnance Board suggested the likelihood that 30–70% of shells would not have passed the standard penetration test specified by the Admiralty.

Efforts to replace the shells were initially resisted by the Admiralty, and action was not taken until Jellicoe became First Sea Lord in December 1916. As an initial response, the worst of the existing shells were withdrawn from ships in early 1917 and replaced from reserve supplies. New shells were designed, but did not arrive until April 1918, and were never used in action.

==== Battlecruiser losses ====
British battlecruisers were designed to chase and destroy enemy cruisers from out of the range of those ships. They were not designed to be ships of the line and exchange broadsides with the enemy. One German and three British battlecruisers were sunk—but none were destroyed by enemy shells penetrating the belt armour and detonating the magazines. Each of the British battlecruisers was penetrated through a turret roof and their magazines ignited by flash fires passing through the turret and shell-handling rooms. Lützow sustained 24 hits and her flooding could not be contained. She was eventually sunk by her escorts' torpedoes after most of her crew had been safely removed (though six trapped stokers died when the ship was scuttled. Derfflinger and Seydlitz sustained 22 hits each but reached port (although in Seydlitz's case only just).

The disturbing feature of the battlecruiser action is the fact that five German battle-cruisers engaging six British vessels of this class, supported after the first twenty minutes, although at great range, by the fire of four battleships of the "Queen Elizabeth" class, were yet able to sink 'Queen Mary' and 'Indefatigable'....The facts which contributed to the British losses, first, were the indifferent armour protection of our battle-cruisers, particularly as regards turret armour, and, second, deck plating and the disadvantage under which our vessels laboured in regard to the light. Of this there can be no question. But it is also undoubted that the gunnery of the German battle-cruisers in the early stages was of a very high standard.

— Sir John Jellicoe, Jellicoe's official despatch

Jellicoe and Beatty, as well as other senior officers, gave an impression that the loss of the battlecruisers was caused by weak armour, despite reports by two committees and earlier statements by Jellicoe and other senior officers that Cordite and its management were to blame. This led to calls for armour to be increased, and an additional 1 in (2.5 cm) was placed over the relatively thin decks above magazines. To compensate for the increase in weight, ships had to carry correspondingly less fuel, water and other supplies. Whether or not thin deck armour was a potential weakness of British ships, the battle provided no evidence that it was the case. At least amongst the surviving ships, no enemy shell was found to have penetrated deck armour anywhere. The design of the new battlecruiser HMS Hood (which was being built at the time of the battle) was altered to give her 5,000 long tons (5,100 t) of additional armour.

==== Ammunition handling ====
British and German propellant charges differed in packaging, handling, and chemistry. The British propellant was of two types, MK1 and MD. The Mark 1 cordite had a formula of 37% nitrocellulose, 58% nitroglycerine, and 5% petroleum jelly. It was a good propellant but burned hot and caused an erosion problem in gun barrels. The petroleum jelly served as both a lubricant and a stabiliser. Cordite MD was developed to reduce barrel wear, its formula being 65% nitrocellulose, 30% nitroglycerine, and 5% petroleum jelly. While cordite MD solved the gun-barrel erosion issue, it did nothing to improve its storage properties, which were poor. Cordite was very sensitive to variations of temperature, and acid propagation/cordite deterioration would take place at a very rapid rate. Cordite MD also shed micro-dust particles of nitrocellulose and iron pyrite. While cordite propellant was manageable, it required a vigilant gunnery officer, strict cordite lot control, and frequent testing of the cordite lots in the ships' magazines.

British cordite propellant (when uncased and exposed in the silk bag) tended to burn violently, causing uncontrollable "flash fires" when ignited by nearby shell hits. In 1945, a test was conducted by the U.S.N. Bureau of Ordnance (Bulletin of Ordnance Information, No. 245, pp. 54–60) testing the sensitivity of cordite to then-current U.S. Naval propellant powders against a measurable and repeatable flash source. It found that cordite would ignite at 530 mm (21 in) from the flash, the current U.S. powder at 120 mm (4.7 in), and the U.S. flashless powder at 25 mm (0.98 in).

This meant that about 75 times the propellant would immediately ignite when exposed to flash, as compared to the U.S. powder. British ships had inadequate protection against these flash fires. German propellant (RP C/12, handled in brass cartridge cases and used in German artillery because their sliding wedge breeches were hard to obturate with smokeless powder,) was less vulnerable and less volatile in composition. German propellants were not that different in composition from cordite—with one major exception: centralite. This was symmetrical diethyl diphenyl urea, which served as a stabiliser that was superior to the petroleum jelly used in British practice. It stored better and burned but did not explode. Stored and used in brass cases, it proved much less sensitive to flash. RP C/12 was composed of 64.13% nitrocellulose, 29.77% nitroglycerine, 5.75% centralite, 0.25% magnesium oxide and 0.10% graphite.

The Royal Navy Battle Cruiser Fleet had also emphasised speed in ammunition handling over established safety protocol. In practice drills, cordite could not be supplied to the guns rapidly enough through the hoists and hatches. To bring up the propellant in good time to load for the next broadside, many safety doors were kept open that should have been shut to safeguard against flash fires. Bags of cordite were also stocked and kept locally, creating a total breakdown of safety design features. By staging charges in the chambers between the gun turret and magazine, the Royal Navy enhanced their rate of fire but left their ships vulnerable to chain reaction ammunition fires and magazine explosions. This 'bad safety habit' carried over into real battle practices. Furthermore, the doctrine of a high rate of fire also led to the decision in 1913 to increase the supply of shells and cordite held on the British ships by 50%, for fear of running out of ammunition. When this exceeded the capacity of the ships' magazines, cordite was stored in insecure places.

The British cordite charges were stored two silk bags to a metal cylindrical container, with a 16-oz gunpowder igniter charge, which was covered with a thick paper wad, four charges being used on each projectile. The gun crews were removing the charges from their containers and removing the paper covering over the gunpowder igniter charges. The effect of having eight loads at the ready was to have 4 short tons (3,600 kg) of exposed explosive, with each charge leaking small amounts of gunpowder from the igniter bags. In effect, the gun crews had laid an explosive train from the turret to the magazines, and one shell hit to a battlecruiser turret was enough to end a ship.

A diving expedition during the summer of 2003 provided corroboration of this practice. It examined the wrecks of Invincible, Queen Mary, Defence, and Lützow to investigate the cause of the British ships' tendency to suffer from internal explosions. From this evidence, a major part of the blame may be laid on lax handling of the cordite propellant for the shells of the main guns. The wreck of the Queen Mary revealed cordite containers stacked in the working chamber of the X turret instead of the magazine.

There was a further difference in the propellant itself. While the German RP C/12 burned when exposed to fire, it did not explode, as opposed to cordite. RP C/12 was extensively studied by the British and, after World War I, would form the basis of the later Cordite SC.

The memoirs of Alexander Grant, Gunner on Lion, suggest that some British officers were aware of the dangers of careless handling of cordite:

With the introduction of cordite to replace powder for firing guns, regulations regarding the necessary precautions for handling explosives became unconsciously considerably relaxed, even I regret to say, to a dangerous degree throughout the Service. The gradual lapse in the regulations on board ship seemed to be due to two factors. First, cordite is a much safer explosive to handle than gun-powder. Second, but more important, the altered construction of the magazines on board led to a feeling of false security....The iron or steel deck, the disappearance of the wood lining, the electric lights fitted inside, the steel doors, open because there was now no chute for passing cartridges out; all this gave officers and men a comparative easiness of mind regarding the precautions necessary with explosive material.

Grant had already introduced measures onboard Lion to limit the number of cartridges kept outside the magazine and to ensure doors were kept closed, probably contributing to her survival. On 5 June 1916, the First Lord of the Admiralty advised Cabinet Members that the three battlecruisers had been lost due to unsafe cordite management.

After the battle, the B.C.F. Gunnery Committee issued a report (at the command of Admiral David Beatty) advocating immediate changes in flash protection and charge handling. It reported, among other things, that:

- Some vent plates in magazines allowed flash into the magazines and should be retro-fitted to a new standard.
- Bulkheads in HMS Lion's magazine showed buckling from fire under pressure (overpressure)—despite being flooded and therefore supported by water pressure—and must be made stronger.
- Doors opening inward to magazines were an extreme danger.
- Current designs of turrets could not eliminate flash from shell bursts in the turret from reaching the handling rooms.
- Ignition pads must not be attached to charges but instead be placed just before ramming.
- Better methods must be found for safe storage of ready charges than the current method.
- Some method for rapidly drowning charges already in the handling path must be devised.
- Handling scuttles (special flash-proof fittings for moving propellant charges through ship's bulkheads), designed to handle overpressure, must be fitted.

==== Gunnery ====
Most of the British gunnery control systems were based on the Dreyer tables, whilst the latest German ones were based on the Petravic system, also referred to the as the "Abfeurungs Gerät". Both had their advantages, and were installed on ships progressively as the war went on, with the Dreyer table having been fitted to a majority of British capital ships by May 1916, whilst at this time the "Abfeurungs Gerät" was mostly limited to the German battlecruisers, and only became standard on all German capital ships completed after the battle. The Royal Navy used centralised fire-control systems on their capital ships, directed from a point high up on the ship where the fall of shells could best be seen, utilising a director sight for both training and elevating the guns. In contrast, the German battlecruisers controlled the fire of turrets using a training-only director (also placed high for best visibility), whilst the firing of the guns remained local. The German range-finding equipment was generally considered superior to that of the British, and its operators were also trained to a higher standard. The German stereoscopic design and its better optics allowed for range estimation out to ~20,000 m, and also meant that the Germans could often still range on a target enshrouded by smoke. By comparison the British coincidence designs were limited to a range of ~17,000 yards and could not be used effectively against a target partially obscured by smoke.

Experience from the battle confirmed the value of firing guns by centralised director, which prompted the Royal Navy to install director firing systems in cruisers and destroyers, where it had not thus far been used, and for secondary armament on battleships.

German ships were considered to have been quicker in determining the correct range to targets, thus obtaining an early advantage. Apart from the German use of better rangefinding equipment, part of the explanation for this was that the British used a 'bracket system', whereby a salvo was fired at the best-guess range and, depending where it landed, the range was progressively corrected up or down until successive shots were landing in front of and behind the enemy. By comparison the Germans used a 'ladder system', whereby an initial volley of three shots at different ranges was used, with the centre shot at the best-guess range. The ladder system allowed the gunners to get ranging information from the three shots more quickly than the bracket system, which required waiting between shots to see how the last had landed. As a result British ships later adopted the German system.

It was determined that 9-foot (2.7 m) range finders of the sort issued to most British ships were not adequate at long range and did not perform as well as the 15-foot (4.6 m) range finders on some of the most modern ships. In 1917, range finders of base lengths of 25 and 30 ft (7.6 and 9.1 m) were introduced on the battleships to improve accuracy.

In the end the pros and cons of either sides gunnery systems seems to have largely weighed each other out, as the average main calibre hit rates of both sides turned out to be very similar. The British fired a total of 4534 shells, obtaining 123 hits in the process, resulting in an average hit rate of 2.71%, whilst the Germans fired a total of 3597 shells, obtaining 124 hits in the process, resulting in an average hit rate of 3.39%.

==== Signalling ====
Throughout the battle, British ships experienced difficulties with communications, whereas the Germans did not suffer such problems. The British preferred signalling using ship-to-ship flag and lamp signals, avoiding wireless, whereas the Germans used wireless successfully. One conclusion drawn was that flag signals were not a satisfactory way to control the fleet. Experience using lamps, particularly at night when issuing challenges to other ships, demonstrated this was an excellent way to advertise your precise location to an enemy, inviting a reply by gunfire. Recognition signals by lamp, once seen, could also easily be copied in future engagements.

British ships both failed to report engagements with the enemy but also, in the case of cruisers and destroyers, failed to actively seek out the enemy. A culture had arisen within the fleet of not acting without orders, which could prove fatal when any circumstances prevented orders being sent or received. Commanders failed to engage the enemy because they believed other, more senior officers must also be aware of the enemy nearby, and would have given orders to act if this was expected. Wireless, the most direct way to pass messages across the fleet (although it was being jammed by German ships), was avoided either for perceived reasons of not giving away the presence of ships or for fear of cluttering up the airwaves with unnecessary reports.

==== Fleet Standing Orders ====
Naval operations were governed by standing orders issued to all the ships. These attempted to set out what ships should do in all circumstances, particularly in situations where ships would have to react without referring to higher authority, or when communications failed. A number of changes were introduced as a result of experience gained in the battle.

A new signal was introduced instructing squadron commanders to act independently as they thought best while still supporting the main fleet, particularly for use when circumstances would make it difficult to send detailed orders. The description stressed that this was not intended to be the only time commanders might take independent action, but was intended to make plain times when they definitely should. Similarly, instructions on what to do if the fleet was instructed to take evasive action against torpedoes were amended. Commanders were given discretion that if their part of the fleet was not under immediate attack, they should continue engaging the enemy rather than turning away with the rest of the fleet. In this battle, when the fleet turned away from Scheer's destroyer attack covering his retreat, not all the British ships had been affected, and could have continued to engage the enemy.

A number of opportunities to attack enemy ships by torpedo had presented themselves but had been missed. All ships, not just the destroyers armed principally with torpedoes but also battleships, were reminded that they carried torpedoes intended to be used whenever an opportunity arose. Destroyers were instructed to close the enemy fleet to fire torpedoes as soon as engagements between the main ships on either side would keep enemy guns busy directed at larger targets. Destroyers should also be ready to immediately engage enemy destroyers if they should launch an attack, endeavouring to disrupt their chances of launching torpedoes and keep them away from the main fleet.

To add some flexibility when deploying for attack, a new signal was provided for deploying the fleet to the centre, rather than as previously only either to left or right of the standard closed-up formation for travelling. The fast and powerful 5th Battle Squadron was moved to the front of the cruising formation so it would have the option of deploying left or right depending upon the enemy position. In the event of engagements at night, although the fleet still preferred to avoid night fighting, a destroyer and cruiser squadron would be specifically detailed to seek out the enemy and launch destroyer attacks.

=== Aviation ===
Scheer's plan for the Sunderland raid relied heavily on aerial reconnaissance by Zeppelins and their unavailability due to the weather conditions was the direct cause of the revised sortie into the Skagerrak. A first wave of four Zeppelins did lift off on the afternoon of 31 May, but they had barely crossed the coast before the battle was underway and the poor visibility prevented them from making any useful sightings before they returned after nightfall. A second wave of five airships was launched around midnight, but only two of these made any sightings; L24 reported attacking a large number of warships off northern Denmark at 03:00, but this seems to have been entirely spurious. Meanwhile L11 observed units of the British fleet that were reported between 03:10 and 04:10; contact was broken off after the airship came under heavy fire including from battleships' main batteries. However, by this time, Scheer was confident that his fleet was out of danger and the Zeppelins were recalled shortly after 06:00. Despite the limited utility of the airship reconnaissance at Jutland, the British overestimated their impact; an Admiralty paper of 1917 recommending the acceleration of the British rigid airship programme stated that "It is no small achievement for Zeppelins to have saved the High Seas Fleet at the Battle of Jutland".

The British meanwhile, had the lead in operating seaplanes from ships at sea. The Grand Fleet's doctrine was not to deploy aircraft until it was certain that an enemy force was in the vicinity; a policy dictated by the limited duration of the available aircraft and the uncertainty of recovery at the end of the flight. Engadine, the seaplane carrier operating with Beatty's cruiser screen, had only two aircraft equipped with radio; one of these did spot Hipper's scouting group at an early stage, but the message could not be relayed by the carrier. A larger and more capable vessel, HMS Campania, unlike Engadine able to fly aircraft off from a short flight deck and recover them while underway, somehow missed the order to sail from Scapa Flow. While attempting to catch up with the Grand Fleet, it was ordered back to harbour by Jellicoe, who underestimated the speed it was able to make and thereby gave away any possibility of an aerial search with several aircraft.

== Controversy ==
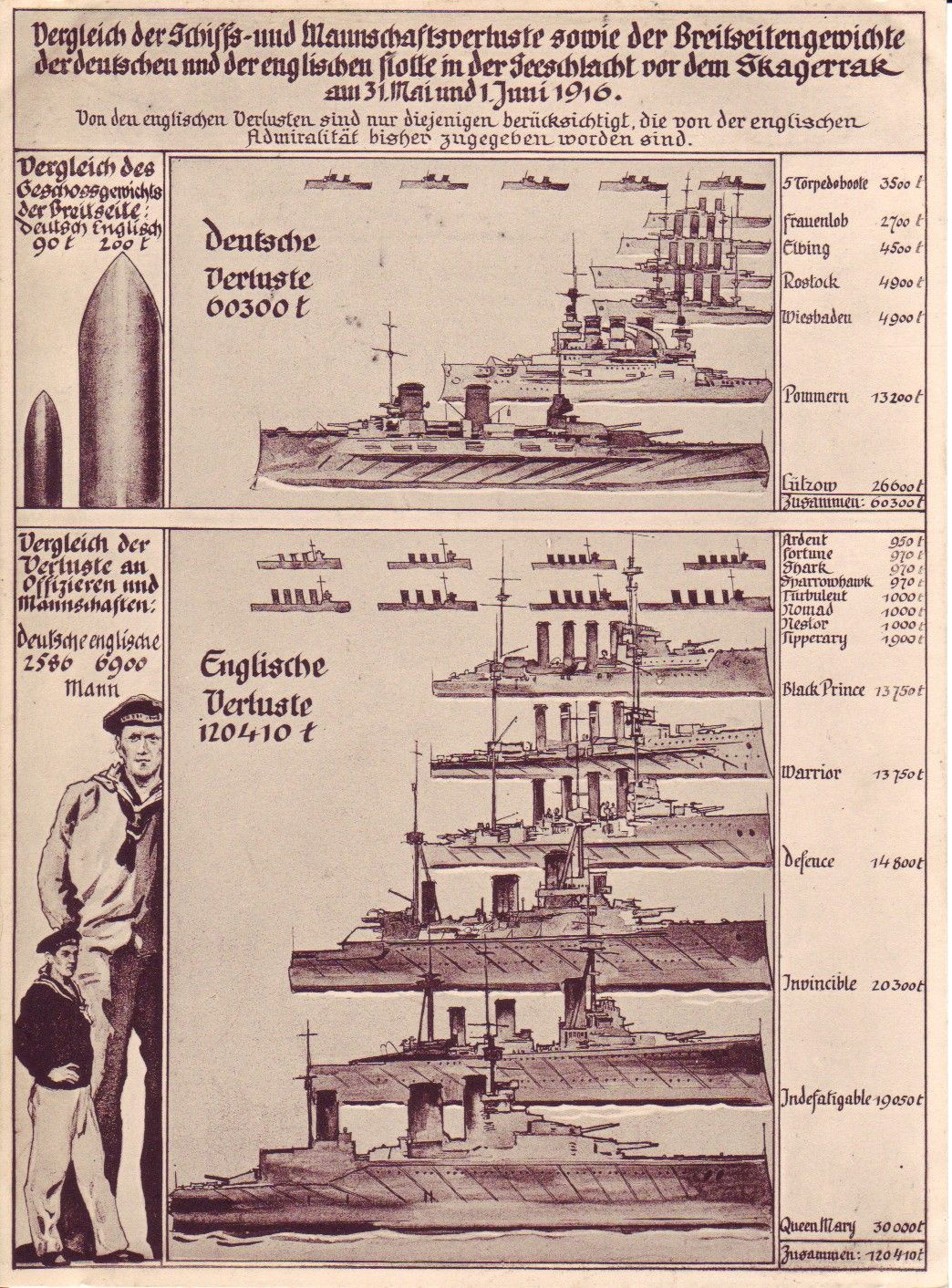
The German propaganda poster proudly boasts of German achievements in the Battle of Jutland

At the time, Jellicoe was criticised for his caution and allowing Scheer to escape as the British had hoped for another Trafalgar. Jellicoe was promoted away from active command to become First Sea Lord, the professional head of the Royal Navy, while Beatty replaced him as commander of the Grand Fleet.

The controversy raged within the navy and in public for about a decade after the war. Criticism focused on Jellicoe's decision at 19:15. Scheer had ordered his cruisers and destroyers forward in a torpedo attack to cover the turning away of his battleships. Jellicoe chose to turn to the south-east, and so keep out of range of the torpedoes. Supporters of Jellicoe, including the historian Cyril Falls, pointed to the folly of risking defeat in battle when one already has command of the sea. Jellicoe himself, in a letter to the Admiralty seventeen months before the battle, said that he intended to turn his fleet away from any mass torpedo attack. (Note: that being the universally accepted proper tactical response to such attacks, practised by all the major navies of the world) He said that, in the event of a fleet engagement in which the enemy turned away, he would assume they intended to draw him over mines or submarines, and he would decline to be so drawn. The Admiralty approved this plan and expressed full confidence in Jellicoe at the time (October 1914).

The stakes were high, the pressure on Jellicoe immense, and his caution it may be argued was understandable. Jellicoe had not only the responsibility of immediate command of the Grand Fleet, the defence of the British waters and British trade; but also of the maintenance of the blockade of Germany which hinged on the continuing presence and superiority of the Grand Fleet. Therefore, Jellicoe had to consider the wider strategic consequences of his actions and results of the battle; which outweighed the short term benefits of a more outright victory. Churchill said of the battle that Jellicoe "was the only man on either side who could have lost the war in an afternoon." The criticism of Jellicoe also fails to sufficiently credit Scheer, who was determined to preserve his fleet by avoiding the full British battle line, and who showed great skill in effecting his escape.

=== Beatty's actions ===
On the other hand, some of Jellicoe's supporters condemned the actions of Beatty for the British failure to achieve a complete victory. Although Beatty was undeniably brave, his mismanagement of the initial encounter with Hipper's squadron and the High Seas Fleet cost him a considerable advantage in the first hours of the battle. His most glaring failure was in not providing Jellicoe with periodic information on the position, course, and speed of the High Seas Fleet. Beatty, aboard the battlecruiser Lion, left behind the four fast battleships of the 5th Battle Squadron—the most powerful warships in the world at the time—engaging with six ships when better control would have given him 10 against Hipper's five. Though Beatty's larger 13.5 in (340 mm) guns out-ranged Hipper's 11 and 12 in (280 and 300 mm) guns by thousands of yards, Beatty held his fire for 10 minutes and closed the German squadron until within range of the Germans' superior gunnery, under lighting conditions that favoured the Germans. Most of the British losses in tonnage occurred in Beatty's force.

== Death toll ==
The total loss of life on both sides was 9,823 personnel: the British losses numbered 6,784 and the German 3,039. Counted among the British losses were two members of the Royal Australian Navy and one member of the Royal Canadian Navy. Six Australian nationals serving in the Royal Navy were also killed.

=== British ===
113,300 tons sunk:

- Battlecruisers Indefatigable ฿, Queen Mary ฿, Invincible
- Armoured cruisers Black Prince, Warrior, Defence
- Flotilla leader Tipperary
- Destroyers Shark, Sparrowhawk, Turbulent ฿, Ardent, Fortune, Nomad ฿, Nestor ฿

฿ indicates ships in Beatty's Battle Cruiser Fleet.

=== German ===
62,300 tons sunk:

- Battlecruiser Lützow
- Pre-dreadnought Pommern
- Light cruisers Frauenlob, Elbing, Rostock, Wiesbaden
- Destroyers (Heavy torpedo-boats) V48, S35, V27, V4, V29

== Status of the survivors and wrecks ==
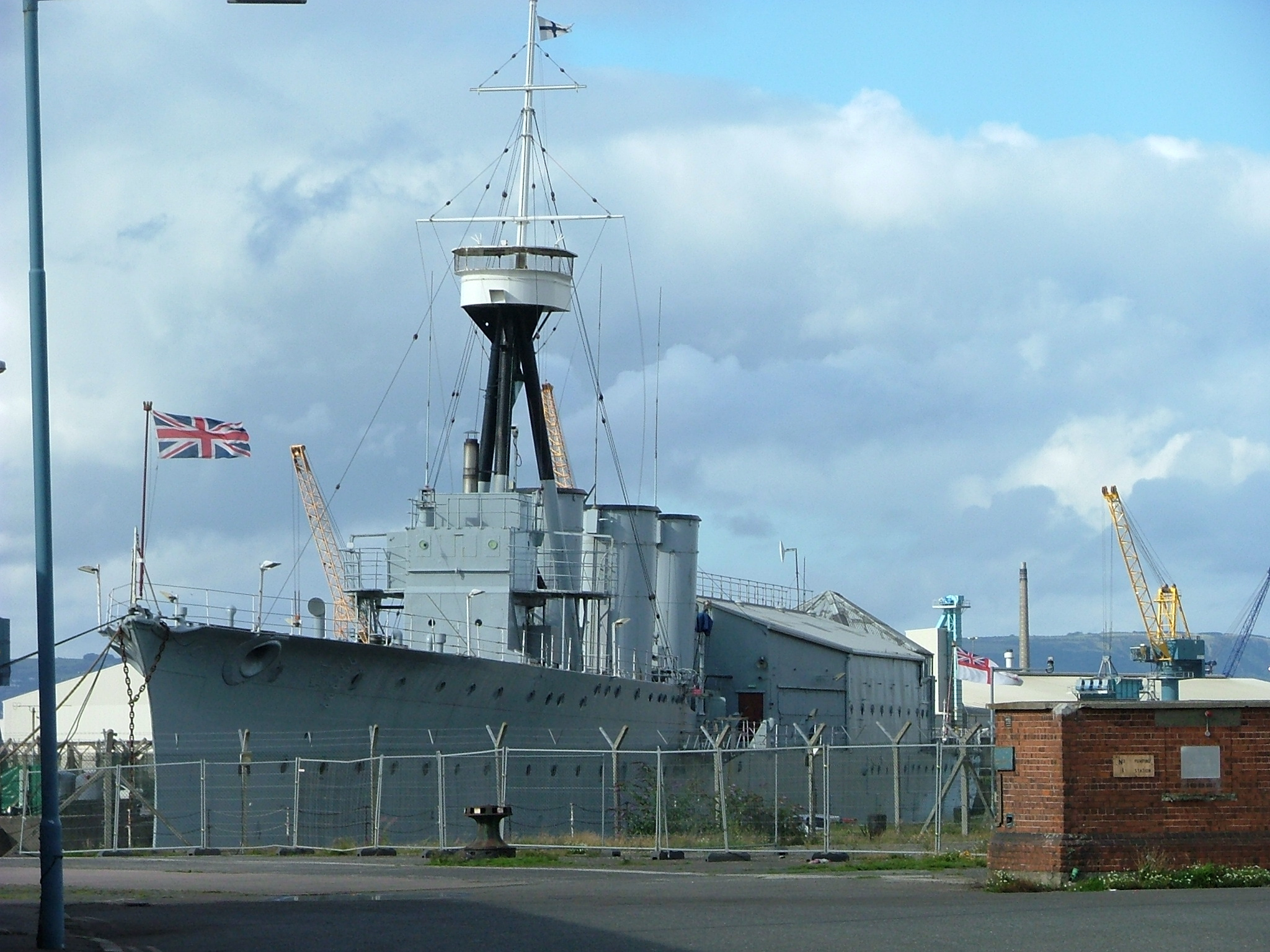
HMS Caroline, the last surviving warship that saw action at Jutland, is preserved in Belfast, Northern Ireland

In the years following the battle the wrecks were slowly discovered. Invincible was found by the Royal Navy minesweeper HMS Oakley in 1919. After the Second World War some of the wrecks seem to have been commercially salvaged. For instance, the Hydrographic Office record for SMS Lützow (No. 32344) shows that salvage operations were taking place on the wreck in 1960. During 2000–2016 a series of diving and marine survey expeditions involving veteran shipwreck historian and archaeologist Innes McCartney located all of the wrecks sunk in the battle. It was discovered that over 60 per cent of them had suffered from metal theft. In 2003 McCartney led a detailed survey of the wrecks for the Channel 4 documentary "Clash of the Dreadnoughts". The film examined the last minutes of the lost ships and revealed for the first time how both 'P' and 'Q' turrets of Invincible had been blasted out of the ship and tossed into the sea before she broke in half. This was followed by the Channel 4 documentary "Jutland: WWI's Greatest Sea Battle", broadcast in May 2016, which showed how several of the major losses at Jutland had actually occurred and just how accurate the "Harper Record" actually was.

On the 90th anniversary of the battle, in 2006, the UK Ministry of Defence announced that the 14 British vessels lost in the battle were being designated as "protected places" under the Protection of Military Remains Act 1986. This legislation only affects British ships and citizens and in practical terms offers no real protection from non-British salvors of the wreck sites. In May 2016 a number of British newspapers named the Dutch salvage company "Friendship Offshore" as one of the main salvors of the Jutland wrecks in recent years and depicted leaked photographs revealing the extent of their activities on the wreck of Queen Mary.

The last surviving veteran of the battle, Henry Allingham, a British RAF (originally RNAS) airman, died on 18 July 2009, aged 113, by which time he was the oldest documented man in the world and one of the last surviving veterans of the whole war. Also among the combatants was the then 20-year-old Prince Albert, serving as a junior officer aboard HMS Collingwood. He was second-in-line to the throne, and would become king as George VI following his brother Edward's abdication in 1936. One ship from the battle survives and is still (in 2026) afloat: the light cruiser HMS Caroline. Decommissioned in 2011, she is docked at the Alexandra Graving Dock in Belfast, Northern Ireland, and is a museum ship.

== Remembrance ==
The Battle of Jutland was annually celebrated as a great victory by the right wing in Weimar Germany. This victory was used to repress the memory that the Kiel sailors' mutiny initiated the German Revolution of 1918–1919, as well as the memory of the defeat in World War I in general. (The celebrations of the Battle of Tannenberg played a similar role.) This is especially true for the city of Wilhelmshaven, where wreath-laying ceremonies and torch-lit parades were performed until the end of the 1960s.

In 1916 Contreadmiral Friedrich von Kühlwetter (1865–1931) wrote a detailed analysis of the battle and published it in a book under the title Skagerrak (first anonymously published), which was reprinted in large numbers until after World War II and had a huge influence in keeping the battle in public memory amongst Germans as it was not tainted by the ideology of the Third Reich. Kühlwetter built the School for Naval Officers at Mürwik near Flensburg, where he is still remembered.

May 2016 marked the 100th-anniversary of the Battle of Jutland. On 29 May, a commemorative service was held at St Mary's Church, Wimbledon, where the ensign from HMS Inflexible is on permanent display. On 31 May, the main service was held at St Magnus Cathedral in Orkney, attended by the British prime minister, David Cameron, and the German president, Joachim Gauck, along with Princess Anne and Vice Admiral Sir Tim Laurence. Another service was held on board HMS Duncan, attended by both British and German sailors, while the German frigate Brandenburg laid a flower wreath at the site of the sinking of HMS Invincible. The Catholic Bishops of England and Wales suggested churches conduct a Requiem Mass for the dead on either 31 May or 1 June 2016. A centennial exposition was held at the Deutsches Marinemuseum in Wilhemshaven from 29 May 2016 to 28 February 2017.

== Film ==
- Wrath of the Seas (Die versunkene Flotte), 1926, director Manfred Noa

== See also ==
- Largest artificial non-nuclear explosions
- Naval warfare of World War I
- Sea War Museum Jutland

== Bibliography ==
- Bennett, Geoffrey (2005). Naval Battles of the First World War. London: Pen & Sword Military Classics. ISBN 1-84415-300-2.
- Brooks, John (2005). Dreadnought Gunnery at the Battle of Jutland: The Question of Fire Control. London: Routledge, Frank Cass series. ISBN 0-7146-5702-6.
- Brooks, John (2016). The Battle of Jutland. Cambridge: Cambridge University Press. ISBN 9781316669051.
- Brown, G.I. (1998). The Big Bang: A History of Explosives. Gloucestershire, UK: Sutton Publishing. ISBN 0-7509-1878-0.
- Brown, David K.; McCallum, Iain (2001). "Ammunition Explosions in World War I: A re-examination of the evidence". Warship International. 38 (1): 58–69. JSTOR 44892738.
- Burr, Lawrence (2006). British Battlecruisers 1914–18. Oxford: Osprey Publishing. ISBN 1846030080.
- Campbell, John (1998). Jutland: An Analysis of the Fighting. Guilford: Lyons Press. ISBN 1-55821-759-2.
- Corbett, Julian S. (2015a). Maritime Operations In The Russo-Japanese War 1904–1905. Vol. 1. Annapolis: Naval Institute Press. ISBN 978-1-59114-197-6.
- Corbett, Julian S. (2015b). Maritime Operations In The Russo-Japanese War 1904–1905. Vol. 2. Annapolis: Naval Institute Press. ISBN 978-1-59114-198-3.
- Fawcett, H. W.; Hooper, G. W. W. (1921). The Fighting at Jutland: The Personal Experiences of Sixty Officers and Men of the British Fleet. Glasgow: Maclure, Macdonald & Co. OCLC 1156367773.
- Forczyk, Robert (2009). Russian Battleship vs Japanese Battleship (Yellow Sea 1904–05). Oxford: Osprey publishing. ISBN 978-1-84603-330-8.
- Götz, Georg (2010). "Remembering the Battle of Jutland in Post-War Wilhelmshaven". In Niven, William; Paver, Chloe (eds.). Difficult Pasts. Memorialisation In Germany since 1945. Macmillan. pp. 360–368. ISBN 978-0-230-20703-5.
- Gordon, Andrew (1996). The Rules of the Game: Jutland and British Naval Command. London: John Murray. ISBN 978-0-14-198032-4.
- Jellicoe, John (1919). The Grand Fleet, 1914–1916. Its Creation, Development, and Work. New York: George H. Doran Company. OCLC 13614571.
- Jellicoe, Nicholas (2018). Jutland: the unfinished battle. Barnsley, South Yorkshire: Seaforth Publishing. ISBN 9781526737281.
- Kennedy, Paul M. (1983). The Rise and Fall of British Naval Mastery. London: Macmillan. ISBN 0-333-35094-4.
- Kühlwetter, Friedrich (1916). Skagerrak : Der Ruhmestag der deutschen Flotte. Berlin: Ullstein.
- Lambert, Nicholas A (1998). "'Our Bloody Ships' or 'Our Bloody System'? Jutland and the Loss of the Battle Cruisers, 1916". The Journal of Military History. 62 (1). Society for Military History: 29–55. doi:10.2307/120394. JSTOR 120394.
- Layman, Richard D. (1996). Naval Aviation in the First World War: Its Impact and Influence. London: Chatham Publishing. ISBN 978-1861760074.
- Marder, Arthur J. (1966). Jutland and after, May 1916 – December 1916. From the Dreadnought to Scapa Flow. Vol. III. Oxford University Press. OCLC 504005780.
- Marder, Arthur J. (2014). 1917, Year of Crisis. From the Dreadnought to Scapa Flow. Vol. IV. Seaforth Publishing. ISBN 978-1473841871.
- Massie, Robert K. (2003). Castles of Steel: Britain, Germany, and the Winning of the Great War at Sea. Random House. ISBN 0-345-40878-0.
- McBride, William Leon (2000). Technological change and the United States Navy, 1865–1945. Baltimore: Johns Hopkins University Press. ISBN 0801864860.
- McCartney, Innes (2016). Jutland 1916: The Archaeology of a Naval Battlefield. Bloomsbury. ISBN 978-1844864164.
- Moretz, Joseph (2002). The Royal Navy and the Capital Ship in the Interwar Period: An Operational Perspective. New York: Routledge. ISBN 0-7146-5196-6.
- Nasmith, George (1919). Canada's Sons and Great Britain during the World War. Introduction by Gen. Sir Arthur W. Currie. Toronto: Thomas Allen.
- Polmar, Norman (2006). Aircraft Carriers: A History of Carrier Aviation and Its Influence on World Events: 1909–1945. Vol. I. Washington D.C.: Potomac Books. ISBN 1574886630.
- Rasor, Eugene L. (2000). Winston S. Churchill, 1874–1965: A Comprehensive Historiography and Annotated Bibliography. London: Greenwood. ISBN 0-3133-0546-3.
- Staff, Gary (2014). German Battlecruisers of World War One: Their Design, Construction and Operations. Barnsley: Seaforth Publishing. ISBN 978-1848323087.
- Steel, Nigel; Hart, Peter (2004). Jutland 1916: Death in the Grey Wastes. London: Cassell. ISBN 0-304-35892-4.
- Stille, Mark (2010). British Dreadnought vs. German Dreadnought: Jutland 1916. Oxford: Osprey Publishing. ISBN 978-1849081672.
- Sutherland, Jonathan; Canwell, Diane (2007). The Battle of Jutland. Barnsley: Pen & Sword Maritime. ISBN 9781844155293.
- Tarrant, V. E. (1995). Jutland: The German Perspective: A New View of the Great Battle, 31 May 1916. London: Arms & Armour Press. ISBN 1-85409-244-8.
- Yates, Keith (2000). Flawed victory : Jutland, 1916. Annapolis: Naval Institute Press. ISBN 1557509816.
