= Zeppelin LZ 41 =

L 11
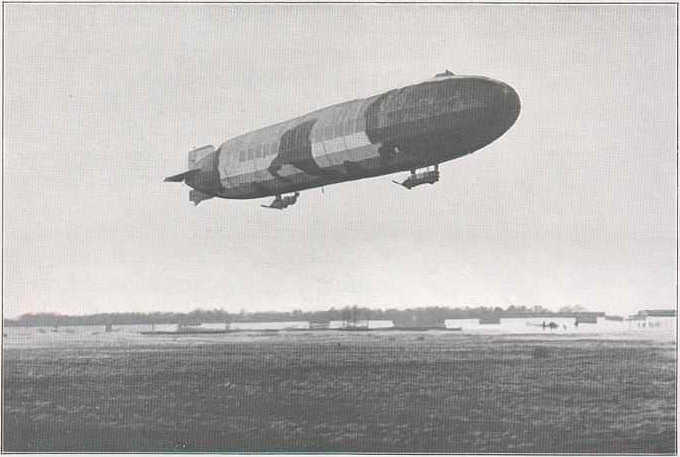

General information
- Type: Zeppelin Type P
- National origin: Germany
- Manufacturer: Luftschiffbau Zeppelin, Löwental

History
- Introduction date: L 11: June 7, 1915

The Zeppelin LZ 41, military designated as L 11, was the 41st airship of Count Ferdinand von Zeppelin and the eleventh Zeppelin to serve in the Imperial German Navy.

During its front-line service, it completed 118 missions. An additional 276 training flights followed.

== History ==
LZ 41 was the first Zeppelin completed at the new airship yard in Löwental near Friedrichshafen. Its maiden flight took place on June 7, 1915. The Navy took delivery of the airship under the designation L 11. Its commanding officer was Oberleutnant zur See Horst Julius Freiherr Treusch von Buttlar-Brandenfels, who had previously commanded L 6.

L 11 was alternately stationed at Nordholz and Hage, performing reconnaissance missions over the North Sea and bombing raids against Britain. On 15-16 June 1915, L 11 attempted to bomb Tyneside but failed to reach the target. The airship attacked London on the night of August 9-10 August, but again failed to get there, another attempt on 12-13 August was equally unsuccessful due to strong headwinds, only L 10 reached Harwich. During another raid on 17-18 August, L 11 reached Kent and bombed Ashford, but reported having bombed Woolwich, some 40 miles (64 km) away.

On October 13, 1915, L 11 took part in a squadron raid on England along with L 12, L 14, L 15, and L 16. The last attack led by von Buttlar was a squadron raid on Liverpool on January 31, 1916.

On February 9, 1916, Corvette Captain Victor Schütze (b. 1878, killed in 1917 during the loss of L 48) took over command, as von Buttlar was reassigned to the new Zeppelin L 30. During the Battle of Jutland, L 11 was one of ten airships deployed and was able to provide the German Navy with valuable information via radio on June 1, 1916, regarding Royal Navy movements off the Dutch coast. British ships opened fire on the airship flying at an altitude of about 1,500 meters. Captain Schütze noted in the logbook:

All ships in sight immediately opened fire with intensity, so that L 11 was at times under fire from 21 large and many smaller ships. Though the fire was ineffective, the large shells and nearby exploding shrapnel caused such violent tremors in the ship's framework that it seemed advisable to increase the distance by appropriate measures.

On November 12, 1916, command passed to Kapitänleutnant Heinrich Hollender (b. 1884). Under its three commanding officers, L 11 carried out a total of 31 reconnaissance and 12 bombing missions, dropping 15,543 kg of bombs. Along with its sister ships L 13, L 14, and L 16, L 11 was among the most militarily successful airships, together accounting for 162 reconnaissance and 56 bombing missions, and responsible for dropping about 17% of the total bomb weight (~75 tons) deployed by airships.

== Fate ==
L 11 was later used as a training airship under reserve Kapitänleutnant Blew. LZ 41/L 11 was decommissioned on April 25, 1917, in Hage, having become outdated.

== Specifications ==
- Lifting gas volume: 31,900 m³ hydrogen
- Length: 163.5 m
- Diameter: 18.7 m
- Payload: 15 t
- Propulsion: Four six-cylinder Maybach engines, each with 210 kW
- Top speed: 26.7 m/s

== See also ==
- List of Zeppelins
