= Zeppelin LZ 50 =

Zeppelin LZ 50 (tactical number L16)
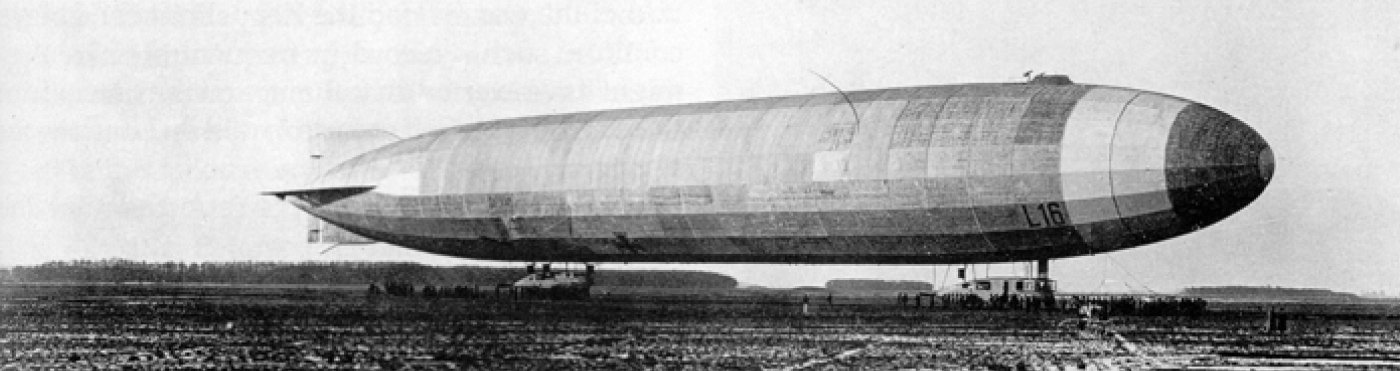
- LZ 50 in 1917

General information
- Type: P-class reconnaissance-bomber rigid airship
- National origin: German Empire
- Manufacturer: Luftschiffbau Zeppelin
- Designer: Ferdinand von Zeppelin
- Status: Retired
- Primary user: Imperial German Navy

History
- Introduction date: 1915
- First flight: 1915
- Retired: 19 October 1917 (crash-landed in Brunsbüttel)

The Zeppelin LZ 50 was the 50th airship built by Count Zeppelin and served in the Imperial German Navy as L16. It belonged to the "P-class" of Zeppelin military airships.

== History ==
L16 is considered one of the most successful naval airships. It conducted 12 bombing raids on England and 44 reconnaissance missions, dropping a total of 18,048 kg of bombs on British targets. Its main base was Nordholz.

Together with its sister ships L11, L13, and L14, the airships of this class were among the most effective from a military standpoint. Collectively, these four ships carried out 162 reconnaissance and 56 bombing missions, accounting for 17% (approximately 75 tons) of all bombs dropped by airships during the war. Overall, airships of the P-class accounted for 38% of the total bomb tonnage dropped during the First World War. Only the first two ships of the new R-class were similarly successful.

L16’s first bombing mission took place on 13 October 1915. During a squadron attack on London during the night of 13–14 October 1915, L16 missed its target and instead dropped its bombs on Hertford. Other targets included Hornsea and Leeds. On 7 November 1915, during another raid on England, three of its engines failed, but the crew, under the command of Oberleutnant zur See Werner Peterson, managed to return safely.

In the winter of 1916, L16 delivered food supplies to the German North Sea islands after sea routes became blocked by ice. From the Hage Airship Base, L16 conducted tests to assess night-time visibility. Unlike the Army, which conducted similar tests with Zeppelin LZ 47, the Navy observed high visibility under moonlight, highlighting the risks from enemy air defenses.

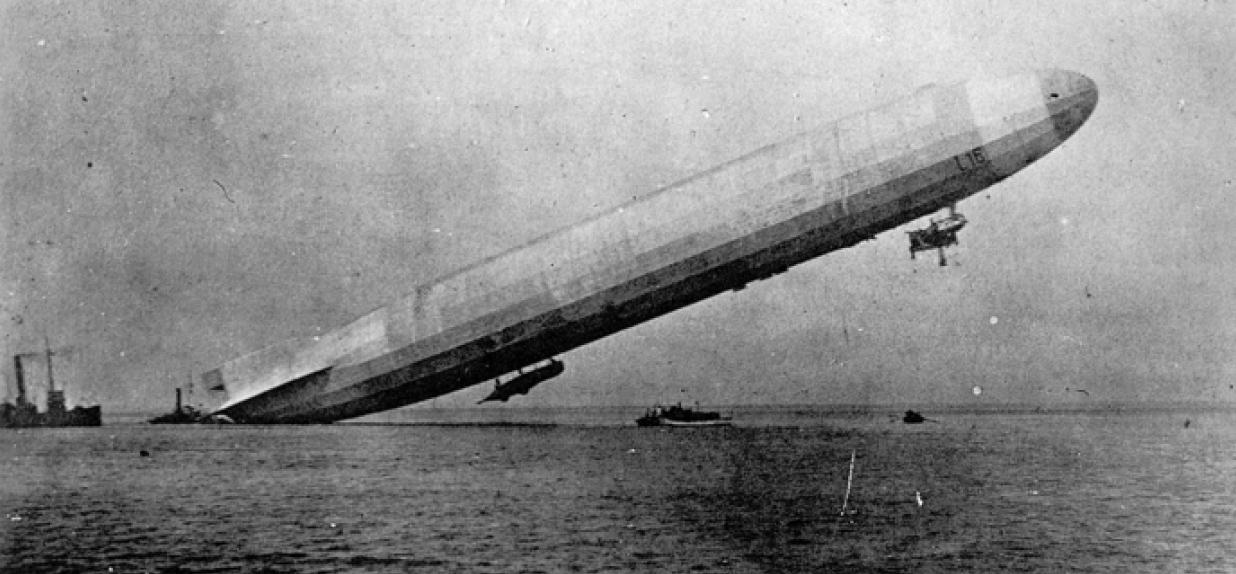
The crash landing of LZ 50 / L16

=== Fate ===
After a crash landing in Brunsbüttel on 19 October 1917, L16 had to be dismantled.

== Specifications ==
- Gas volume: 31,900 m³ Hydrogen
- Length: 163.00 m
- Diameter: 18.70 m
- Payload: 16.2 t
- Propulsion: Four Maybach HSLu engines, each producing 240 PS
- Speed: 26.7 m/s

== See also ==
- List of Zeppelins
