= Zeppelin LZ 74 =

LZ 74 (L 32)
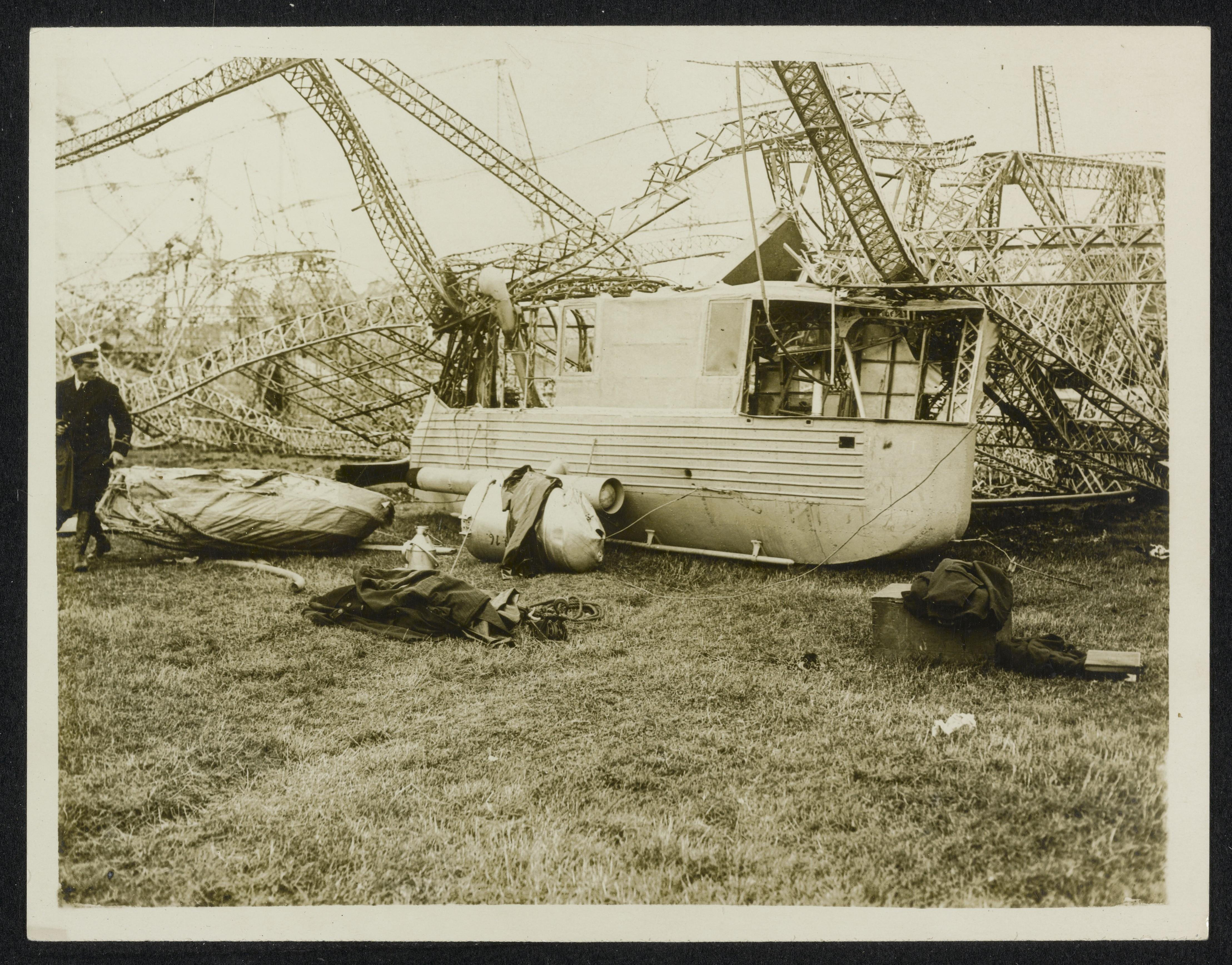
- The damaged gondola of the presumed wreck of LZ 74 / L 32

General information
- Type: Zeppelin R Class
- Owners: Imperial German Navy
- Construction number: LZ 74
- Serial: L 32

History
- First flight: 4 August 1916
- Last flight: 24 September 1916
- Fate: Shot down on 24 September 1916 by 2nd Lt Frederick Sowrey

LZ 74 (navy designation L 32) was an R Class super-zeppelin belonging to the Imperial German Navy. It was shot down in 1916.

== Missions ==
The airship took part in three attacks on England dropping 6,860 kg (15,120 lb) of bombs.

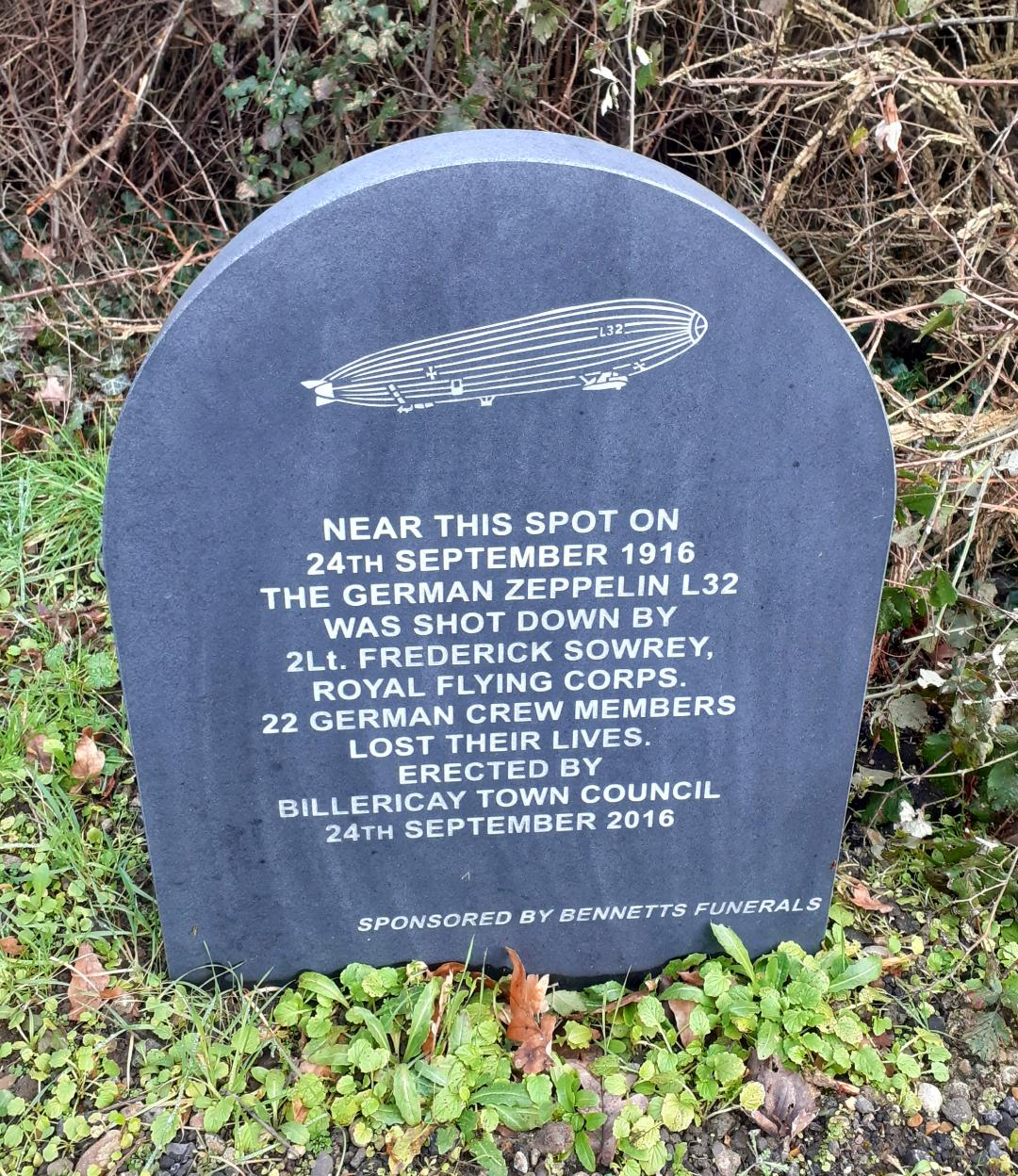
L32 Memorial Great Burstead

== Destroyed ==
On its final mission LZ 74 was commanded by Kapitan-Leutnant Werner Petersen. The Airship set out with LZ 72, LZ 76 and LZ 78 part of Zeppelin raid on the night of 23 September 1916.

Second Lieutenant Frederick Sowrey, of 39 Home Defence Squadron, in a Royal Aircraft Factory BE.2C, launched from Sutton Farm at 23:30 hours to patrol toward Joyce Green. Flying at 13,000 feet (4,000 m), he spotted Zeppelin LZ 74 at about 0110 hours. He was able to close in with the Zeppelin until he was close enough to fire three drums of incendiary ammunition into its belly. Round after round hit the Airship before it finally exploded in flame. There were no survivors from the aircrew; most of the bodies recovered were charred and burned. The burning wreckage of L 32 fell into farm fields off Green Farm Lane in Great Burstead, Essex, crashing at 01.30. The site drew enormous crowds. The crew's bodies (22 in total) were buried at Great Burstead Church under 1 mile from the crash site, being buried on the 27th of September 1916, then exhumed in 1966 and reburied at the German Military Cemetery Cannock Chase.

== Specifications (LZ 74 / Type R zeppelin) ==
Data from Zeppelin : rigid airships, 1893-1940

General characteristics

- Crew: 17-19
- Capacity: 32,400 kg (71,430 lb) typical disposable load
- Length: 198 m (649 ft 7 in)
- Diameter: 23.9 m (78 ft 5 in) maximum
- Fineness ratio: 8.24
- Volume: 55,200 m^{3} (1,950,000 cu ft) in 19 gas cells
- Empty weight: 31,400 kg (69,225 lb)
- Gross weight: 32,908 kg (72,550 lb)
- Fuel capacity: 6,250 kg (13,779 lb)
- Useful lift: 63,800 kg (140,700 lb)
- Powerplant: 5 × Maybach HS Lu 6-cylinder water-cooled in-line piston engines, 180 kW (240 hp) each
- Propellers: 4-bladed Lorenzen fixed-pitch propellers

Performance

- Maximum speed: 103 km/h (64 mph, 56 kn)
- Cruise speed: 81 km/h (50 mph, 44 kn)
- Range: 7,400 km (4,600 mi, 4,000 nmi) at 81 km/h (50 mph; 44 kn)
- Service ceiling: 3,900 m (12,800 ft) static
- Rate of climb: 10 m/s (2,000 ft/min) maximum permitted (r-class)

Armament

- Guns: machine-guns in hull-top positions and gondolas
- Bombs: up to 60 bombs to a total of 5,000 kg (11,023 lb)

== See also ==
- List of Zeppelins
