= Zeppelin LZ 69 =

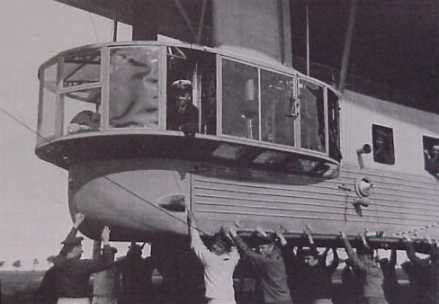
L 24 with Kapitänleutnant Robert Koch visible in the window

Zeppelin LZ 69, with military designation L 24, was a Q-class Zeppelin built by Luftschiffbau Zeppelin in Potsdam for the Imperial German Navy. It made its first flight on 20 May 1916.

L 24 was transferred a few days later to the Tønder Airship Base and remained stationed there until 28 December 1916, when it caught fire during towing into the Toska double hangar, also igniting L 17. Both airships were completely destroyed in the fire.

== Commanders and Deployment ==
Kapitänleutnant Robert Koch was the commander and Lieutenant Kurt von Collani served as first officer on L 24 from 22 May to 2 October 1916. Afterwards, First Lieutenant Kurt Friemel took over as commander. Among the new crew members was Quirin Gerstl, who later wrote about his experiences.

L 24 undertook 33 flights in total, including 4 bombing raids and 19 reconnaissance missions.

== Battle of Jutland, 1 June 1916 ==
During the Battle of Jutland, L 24 was dispatched from Tønder shortly after midnight on 1 June 1916. Between 01:00 and 02:00, it observed flashes, searchlights, and explosions 20–35 nautical miles northwest of Horns Rev. At 02:30 and again at 03:05, the airship reported coming under fire from British vessels 50 nautical miles west of Bovbjerg Lighthouse, and responded by dropping salvos of three to five 50 kg bombs on unidentified ships. Postwar research showed that no warships of either side were in that area, and what the crew of L 24 believed that they saw remains a mystery.

== Bombing in Norfolk, 3 September 1916 ==
On the night of 2–3 September 1916, L 24 participated in a large-scale raid with 16 airships targeting England. L 24 was scheduled to bomb Great Yarmouth, but instead dropped bombs near the airfield at Bacton, about 30 km farther north, around 01:45. Pilot E.L. Pulling, who had taken off from that airfield in a Royal Flying Corps B.E.2c, observed the bombing but failed to locate the high-flying Zeppelin.

That same night, the German airship SL 11 was the first Zeppelin shot down over England.

== London Raid, 23/24 September 1916 ==
L 24 participated in a major raid on the night of 23–24 September 1916 involving 12 airships. It likely flew alongside the super Zeppelins L 30 (von Buttlar), L 31 (Heinrich Mathy), L 32 (Petersen), and L 33 (Alois Böcker), all targeting London. L 24's specific actions are unknown, but L 32 was shot down in flames, and L 33 was seriously damaged and crash-landed.

Seven older airships also flew towards the English Midlands during the raid. Among them, L 17 (Hermann Kraushaar) bombed Nottingham.

== Hertfordshire Bombing, 2 October 1916 ==
On the night of 1–2 October 1916, seven airships participated in a bombing raid over England, while four others turned back. L 24 and L 21 were assigned to bomb Manchester but were pushed farther south by the wind.

Around 22:00, L 24 reached the Norfolk coast and by midnight had approached Cambridge before veering northwest. Around the same time, L 31 (Mathy) was shot down near Potters Bar, 20 km north of London.

L 24 continued slowly to Shefford and was drawn by lights from the airfield in Willian, Hertfordshire, 20 km north of Mathy's crash site. At 01:14, it began bombing with 28 high-explosive and 26 incendiary bombs, along a 4 km path east from the airfield. One airfield guard was killed, but damage was otherwise minimal. A cap lost by a crew member also fell over the town of Weston, Hertfordshire.

Robert Koch then headed east and crossed the coast at Kessingland near Lowestoft at 02:35. During the return, the tail shaft in the forward gondola broke, causing the propeller to spin uncontrollably. A mechanic was sent outside the icy gondola to stop the propeller manually. Hours later, the 18-foot-long propeller fell off into the darkness. Back in Tønder, Kapitänleutnant Robert Koch stepped down. On 18 December 1916, he and First Officer Schon Schweym took command of L 39. They were both killed on 17 March 1917 when it was shot down west of Compiègne.

== Hartlepool Raid, 27/28 November 1916 ==
In early October 1916, First Lieutenant Kurt Friemel became the new commander of L 24.

On the evening of 27 November 1916, L 24 joined super-Zeppelins L 34, L 35, and L 36 on a bombing mission targeting the Newcastle upon Tyne area. However, L 34 (Max Dietrich) was spotted near Hartlepool around 23:30 and shot down by a B.E.2c fighter after being illuminated by searchlights. Witnessing this, Friemel chose to abort the mission without dropping bombs, as did the other airships.

The same night, a southern group of older airships attempted to attack the Midlands. L 21 (Frankenberg) was pursued extensively and eventually shot down off Lowestoft. One of the attackers was E.L. Pulling, who had earlier failed to intercept L 24 in September.

== Destruction in Tønder, 28 December 1916 ==
On the afternoon of 28 December 1916, L 24 returned to the Tønder Airship Base from a minesweeping mission in stormy weather. During towing into the Toska double hangar, heavy crosswinds made it difficult to control. Russian POWs were among the crew helping to guide the airship. About a third of the way inside, L 24 struck a large lit AEG lightbulb on the ceiling, causing a spark that ignited a gas cell. Flames quickly engulfed L 24 and then L 17, already inside the hangar. Both airships were destroyed. Eyewitness Quirin Gerstl, stationed at the rudder, managed to escape through a window, and all others survived.

Repairs to the Toska hangar were completed, and it reopened in April 1917.
