= Heinrich Mathy =

German aviation leader

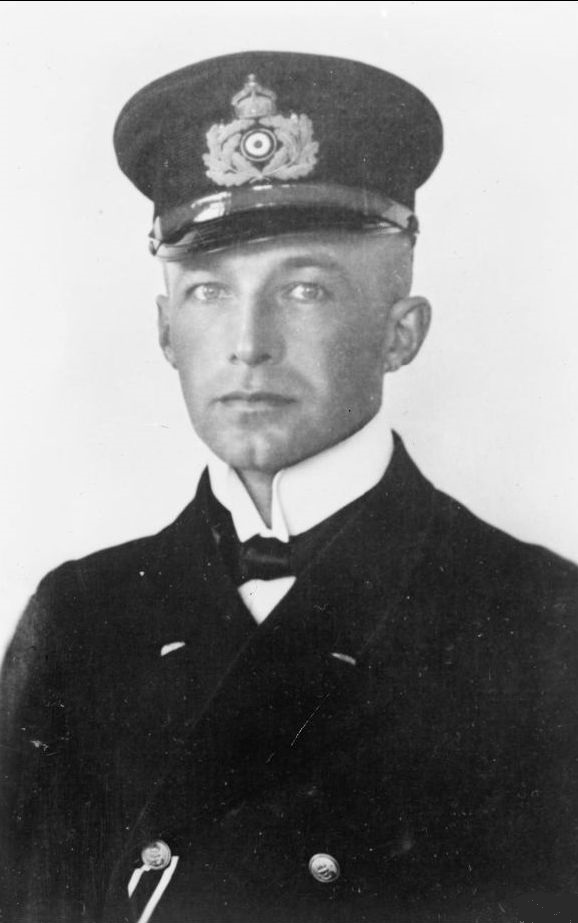
- Heinrich Mathy in naval uniform
- Born: 4 April 1883; Mannheim, Grand Duchy of Baden, Germany
- Died: 2 October 1916 (aged 33); Potters Bar in Hertfordshire, England
- Military career
- Allegiance: German Empire
- Branch: Imperial German Navy
- Service years: 1900–1916
- Rank: Kapitänleutnant (Lieutenant)
- Unit: Marine-Luftschiff-Abteilung
- Conflicts: First World War

Heinrich Mathy was a commander of Zeppelin airships in the Imperial German Navy during the First World War. He became famous during the bombing campaign against Britain, but was killed when his airship was shot down during a raid on London in 1916.

== Early career ==
Heinrich Mathy was born on 4 April 1883 at Mannheim in the Grand Duchy of Baden, now Baden-Württemberg. The son of a banker, Mathy had an ambition to join the Imperial German Navy, which he entered as a cadet on 7 April 1900. Promoted to lieutenant in 1905, he was posted to an armed yacht, SMS Loreley, which was based at Constantinople, now Istanbul. His next posting was to the torpedo boat SMS S119 where he was promoted to kapitänleutnant in 1910. In October 1912, Mathy was appointed to the Naval Academy Mürwik as an instructor; it was there in July 1913 that he was able to experience a flight in a Zeppelin. Following the end of his posting at the academy, he was seconded for a summer to the Naval Airship Division (German: Marine-Luftschiff-Abteilung).

== Airship service ==
At the outbreak of the First World War in August 1914, Mathy was commanding the torpedo boat SMS S177. At the beginning of 1915, Kapitän zur See Peter Strasser, the head of the Airship Division, had Mather transferred to his command, where Mathy took command of L 5; his first operational mission to Britain was foiled by bad weather. On 14 April, on L 9, Mathy bombed Wallsend and Blyth, Northumberland, but caused little damage. On 6 June, Mathy set out for London on L 9; bad weather forced a diversion to Kingston-upon-Hull where 26 civilians were killed. After three attempts that were foiled by engine problems, on L 13, Mather finally reached London on 8–9 September, leaving 22 civilians dead and 87 injured, and causing damage totalling over £500,000. On 13 October, Mather again in L 13, lost his bearings while attempting to attack London, but bombed the Royal Arsenal at Woolwich instead, causing little damage. Shortly after this raid, Mathy gave an interview to an American journalist for the New York World, which was quickly reprinted in British newspapers. In it, Mathy incorrectly claimed that British anti-aircraft guns had been sited on St Paul's Cathedral which they he had been ordered not to bomb. The article gave the British public a name to attach to the Zeppelin crews that the press had dubbed "baby killers".

On 31 March 1916, en route for London, L 13 was hit by a 6-pounder shell near Stowmarket, puncturing two cells, but managed to limp back to the base at Hage. Reequipped with the new high-flying R Class "super-Zeppelin", L 31, Mathy participated in two abortive raids in late July and early August. Early on 25 August, Mathy's L 31 was the only one of thirteen naval Zeppelins to reach London, but apparently became disorientated and only succeeded in hitting the suburbs of Southeast London, killing nine civilians. In another raid on 23–24 September, Mathy again made navigational errors, bombing suburban South and East London but claiming to have bombed the West End and the City; together with L 33 which also bombed East London, 31 people were killed. Later that night, L 33 and L 32 had been shot down by British aircraft using a new type of ammunition, the latter catching fire and killing all the crew; this followed the loss in flames of the army airship SL 11 three weeks previously. The surviving naval Zeppelin crews were demoralised; Mathy's flight engineer wrote;

Our nerves are on edge, and even the most energetic and determined cannot shake off the gloomy atmosphere. It is only a question of time before we join the rest. Everyone admits that they feel it. Our nerves are ruined by mistreatment. If anyone should say that he was not haunted by visions of burning airships, then he would be a braggart.

The wreckage of L 31 on an oak tree near Potters Bar in Hertfordshire.

On 1 October 1916, eleven naval Zeppelins embarked on raids on London and the Midlands. Mathy in L 31 crossed the English coast near Lowestoft and approached London from the north. Mathy steered a meandering course, attempting to evade the searchlights that found the airship over Essex and Hertfordshire. The resulting anti-aircraft fire attracted the attention of the patrolling fighters of No. 39 Squadron; a B.E.2c aircraft flown by 2nd Lieutenant Wulstan Tempest approached, causing Mathy to release his bomb load over Cheshunt and turn west, pursued by Tempest. On Tempest's third attack, L 31 caught fire and crashed in parkland at Potters Bar, Hertfordshire; some of the crew, including Mathy, jumped to their deaths to escape the flames. According to some accounts, Mathy was still alive when found some distance away, but died shortly afterwards.

The grave markers for four Zeppelin crews at Cannock Chase German Military Cemetery; their names are inscribed on the horizontal slabs.

Mathy and his crew were buried with military honours at Mutton Lane Cemetery in Potters Bar, beside the remains of the crew of SL 11. The graves were restored in 1930 and a memorial service attended by the German ambassador was held annually until 1939. The remains were reinterred at the Cannock Chase German Military Cemetery in 1962.
