= Zeppelin LZ 72 =

German airship

LZ 72
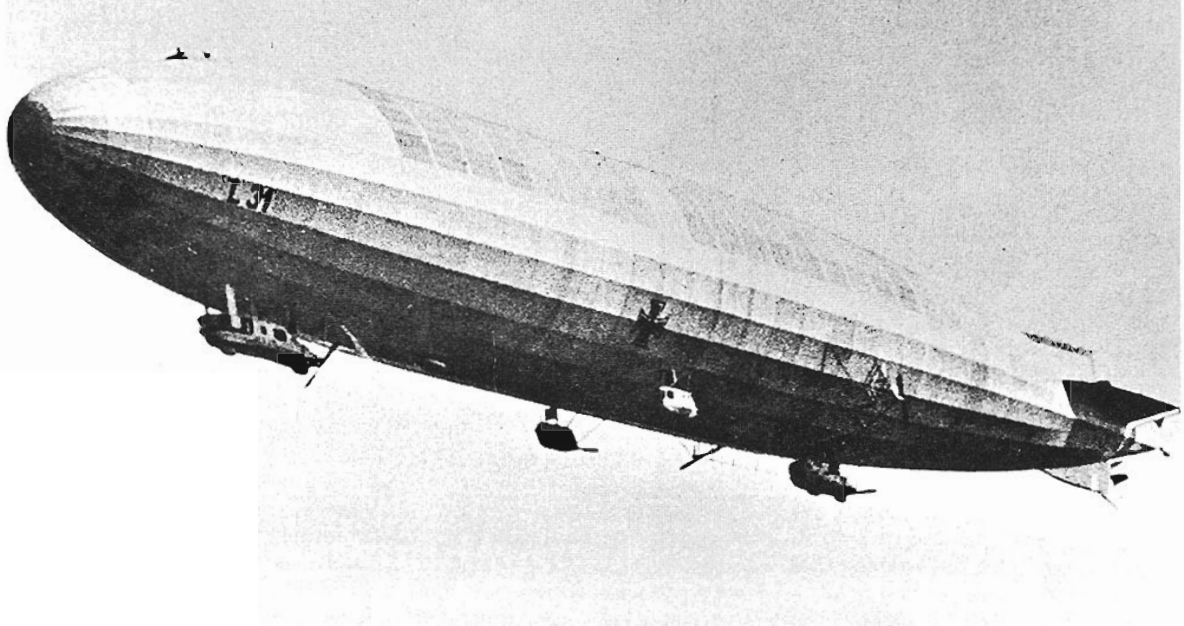
- L 31 (LZ 72) in flight

General information
- Type: Zeppelin R Class
- Owners: Imperial German Navy
- Construction number: LZ 72
- Serial: L31

History
- First flight: 12 July 1916
- Last flight: 2 October 1916
- Fate: Destroyed

LZ 72 (navy designation L 31) was an R Class super-Zeppelin airship of the Imperial German Navy. It was commanded by Kapitänleutnant Heinrich Mathy, an experienced commander, and took part in several raids over Britain in 1916 during the First World War before being shot down north of London.

== Service ==
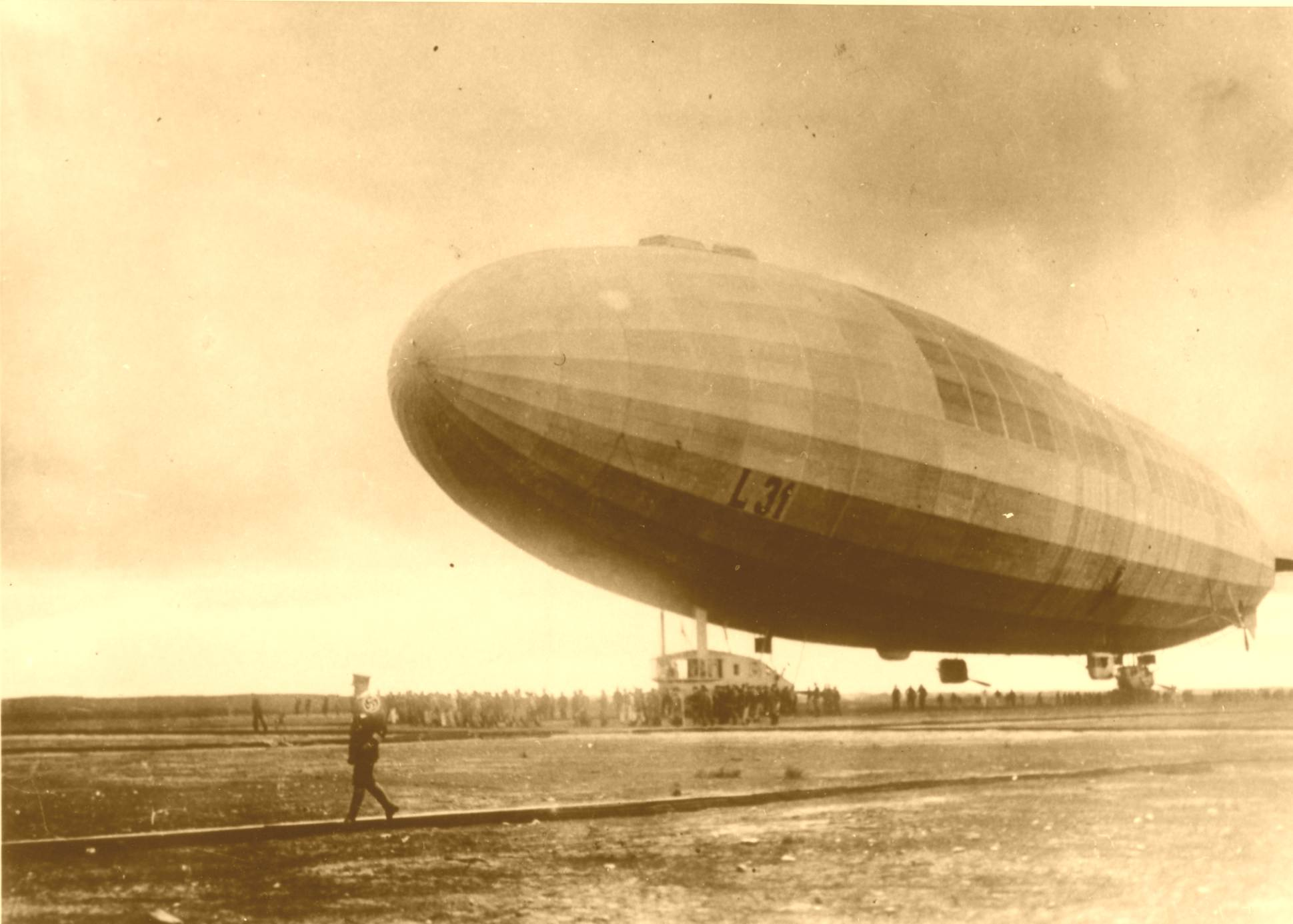
L31 (LZ 72) being manoeuvred on the ground with Peter Strasser, chief commander of Navy Zeppelins, pacing in the foreground.

The first sortie of LZ 72 (L 31) was on the night of 28-29 July 1916, when it formed part of a raid on Britain with nine other new "Super Zeppelins", four of which returned early while the others, including L 31, found the ground was obscured by fog and returned to base at Nordholz. Subsequent raids on 31 July and 2 August only reached Kent because of high winds and came under fire by coastal batteries. On 8-9 August together with Zeppelin L 30, L 31 raided the northeast coast of England, damaging Kingston-upon-Hull. It also participated in a naval reconnaissance role during the Sunderland raid of 19 August 1916. On 24-25 August, L 31 formed part of a raid by thirteen naval Zeppelins, although it was the only one to reach London. Following the Thames in thick cloud, Heinrich Mathy in command dropped bombs near docks at the Isle of Dogs and Deptford before taking a circuitous route over southeast London, damaging houses in Greenwich, Blackheath and Eltham. Nine civilians were killed and damage estimated at £130,000 was caused; L 31 was chased by three Royal Flying Corps aircraft but escaped damage until it suffered a heavy landing at base, putting it out of action for a month. On 23-24 September, L 31 again reached London, this time bombing Mitcham, Streatham and Brixton in South London and Leyton in East London before returning; Mathy was apparently disorientated because he claimed to have bombed the West End and the City of London. Together with Zeppelin L 33 which was shot down, the raid killed 35, injured 113 and caused almost £65,000 worth of damage.

The wreckage of L 31 on an oak tree near Potters Bar in Hertfordshire.

Its last flight was launched late at night on 1 October 1916, together with ten other naval Zeppelins. Several miles north of London, it was caught in searchlights and anti-aircraft fire. During this engagement, 2nd Lt. Wulstan J. Tempest was on patrol in a B.E.2 aircraft and spotted the zeppelin. He proceeded to engage the airship with incendiary rounds, causing the ship to burst into flames and crash in a field at Oakmere Park near Potter's Bar in Hertfordshire. The entire crew died, and were originally buried in Potters Bar, but were reinterred at Cannock Chase German Military Cemetery in the 1960s. After this disastrous crash, the Imperial German Navy began reducing the number of zeppelin raids.

== Operators ==
German Empire

- Imperial German Navy

== Specifications (LZ 72 / Type R zeppelin) ==
Data from Zeppelin : rigid airships, 1893-1940

General characteristics

- Crew: 17-19
- Capacity: 32,400 kg (71,430 lb) typical disposable load
- Length: 198 m (649 ft 7 in)
- Diameter: 23.9 m (78 ft 5 in) maximum
- Fineness ratio: 8.24
- Volume: 55,200 m^{3} (1,950,000 cu ft) in 19 gas cells
- Empty weight: 31,400 kg (69,225 lb)
- Gross weight: 32,908 kg (72,550 lb)
- Fuel capacity: 6,250 kg (13,779 lb)
- Useful lift: 63,800 kg (140,700 lb)
- Powerplant: 5 × Maybach HS Lu 6-cylinder water-cooled in-line piston engines, 180 kW (240 hp) each
- Propellers: 4-bladed Lorenzen fixed-pitch propellers

Performance

- Maximum speed: 103 km/h (64 mph, 56 kn)
- Cruise speed: 81 km/h (50 mph, 44 kn)
- Range: 7,400 km (4,600 mi, 4,000 nmi) at 81 km/h (50 mph; 44 kn)
- Service ceiling: 3,900 m (12,800 ft) static
- Rate of climb: 10 m/s (2,000 ft/min) maximum permitted (r-class)

Armament

- Guns: machine-guns in hull-top positions and gondolas
- Bombs: up to 60 bombs to a total of 5,000 kg (11,023 lb)

== See also ==
- List of Zeppelins
