= Mutton Lane Cemetery =

Cemetery in Hertfordshire, England

Coordinates: 51.6924°N 0.1852°W

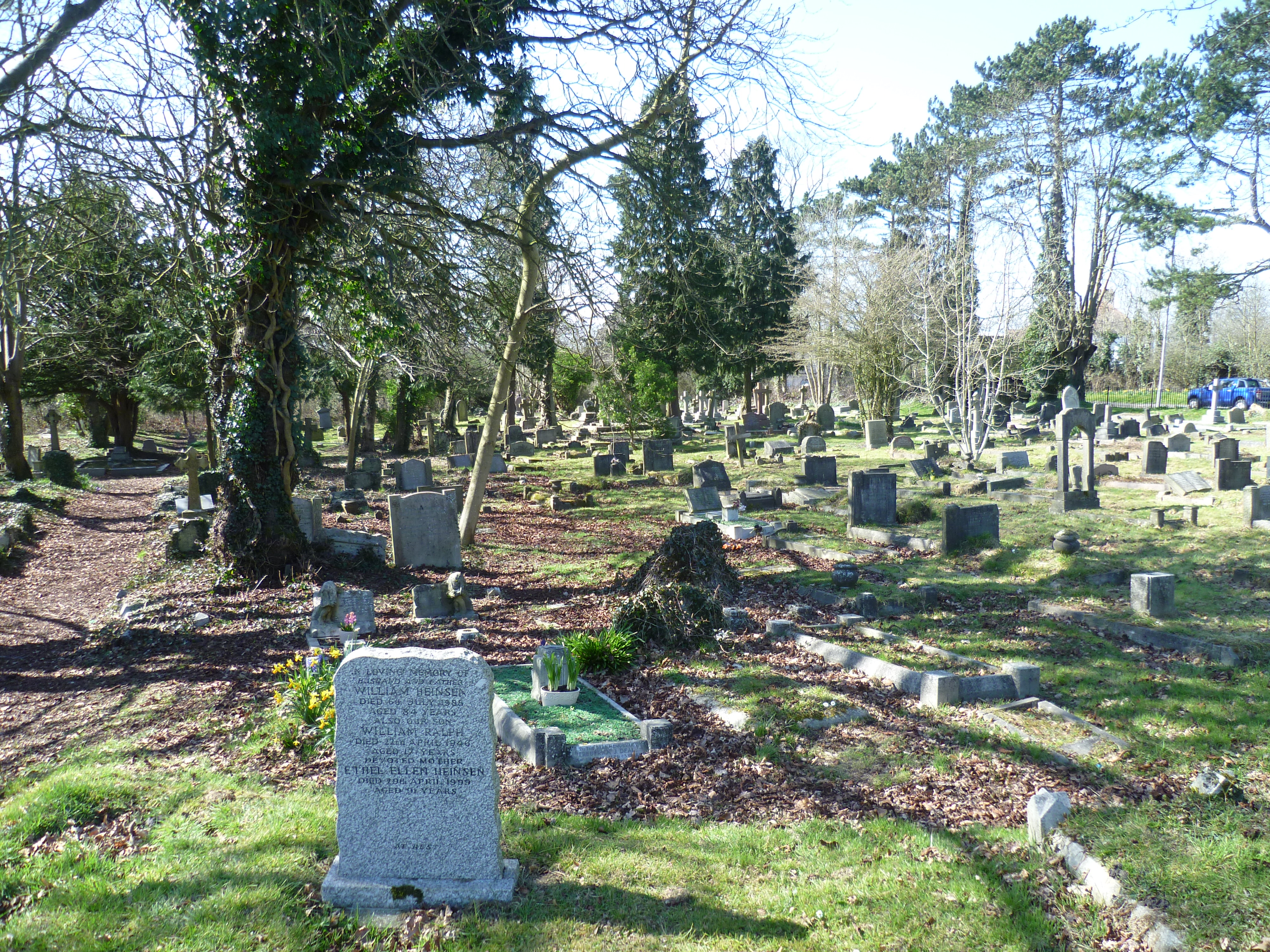
Mutton Lane Cemetery

Mutton Lane Cemetery, officially known as St Mary's Cemetery, is a cemetery in Mutton Lane, Potters Bar, Hertfordshire, that is associated with nearby St Mary the Virgin and All Saints church. The cemetery includes a garden of remembrance for British prisoners of war.

== History ==
In 1909 a gothic-style lychgate was built on the northern side of the cemetery which is locally listed by Hertsmere Borough Council.

The cemetery contains thirteen Commonwealth war graves of service personnel, three from World War I and ten from World War II. The cemetery also used to hold the German war graves of Hauptmann Wilhelm Schramm and the 15 crew of his airship, the SL-11, and Kapitan Heinrich Mathy and his crew of the Zeppelin LZ 72, which were separately shot down in 1916; they were more recently reburied at the Cannock Chase German Military Cemetery.

The cemetery was closed to new burials in the 1970s, however, ashes may still be interred there.
