= Zeppelin L 30 =

R-class Super Zeppelin

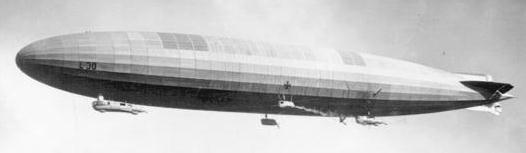
- Zeppelin "L 30" flying

History

German Empire
- Name: LZ 62
- Operator: Imperial German Navy
- Builder: Luftschiffbau Zeppelin
- Decommissioned: 17 November 1917
- Maiden voyage: 28 May 1916
- Out of service: 17 November 1917
- Identification: "L 30"
- Fate: Given to Belgium as war reparations after World War I. Broken up in 1920 after a suitable placement for it in Belgium was not found.

General characteristics
- Type: Airship
- Displacement: 36,186 kg
- Length: 198 metres (650 ft)
- Beam: 23.9 metres (78 ft) in diameter
- Installed power: 6 x Maybach HSLu each totaling 240 hp; combined performance: 1,440 hp.
- Propulsion: 6 Lorenzen propellers
- Speed: 103 km/h (64 mph)
- Range: 7,400 km (4,600 mi); height: 3,900 m (12,800 ft)
- Boats & landing craft carried: 4 gondolas
- Capacity: 55,000 m^{3} (1,900,000 ft^{3}) (gas volume)
- Crew: 17
- Armament: 10 x Type 15/08 machine guns; Up to 7,600 kg of bombs

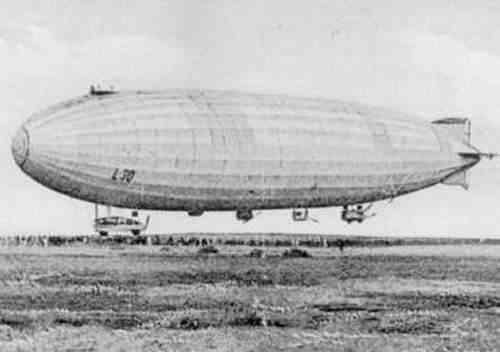
Zeppelin "L 30" seen from the front

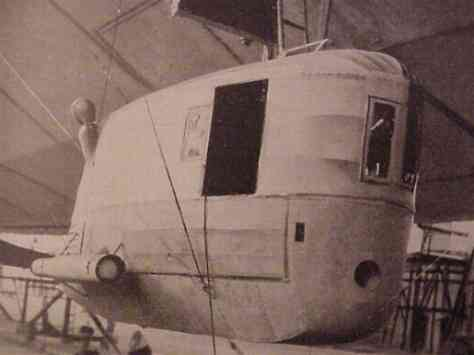
Right gondola of Zeppelin "L 30"

Zeppelin "L 30" (factory number "LZ 62") was the first R-class "Super Zeppelin" of the German Empire. It was the most successful airship of the First World War with 31 reconnaissance flights and 10 bombing runs carrying a total of 23,305kg of bombs, with the first ones targeting England, and the four final raids targeting Livonia and Ösel (Saaremaa). At the time of its construction, It was the world's largest Zeppelin, and with its 6 engines, "L 30" could reach speeds higher than 100km/h, making it the fastest Zeppelin in the world as well.

It was constructed at Luftschiffbau Zeppelin in Friedrichshafen, the first with gondolas on the sides. It remained in the service of the Imperial German Navy from 1916 to its decommissioning in 1917. "L 30" was decommissioned in 1917, and survived World War I. It was handed over to Belgium as part of the war reparations laid on Germany. Its gondolas are on display today at the Royal Military Historical Museum in Brussels, the only remaining gondolas of a war Zeppelin in the world.

A famous photo of Count Ferdinand von Zeppelin aboard the "L 30" with Hauptmann Macher exists, allegedly taken sometime in April 1916 in Friedrichshafen, before its completion.

== Construction ==
Zeppelin LZ 62 was the prototype of the Zeppelin R Class, the so-called Großkampftyps (dubbed "Super-Zeppelin" by the English). Unlike the P and Q Class of Zeppelins which had been in use at the outbreak of war, the R Class was an entirely new design, developed in April 1915 by Dr. Arnstein. Drawing on experiences from the early months of WWI and requests from the German Imperial Navy, Arnstein developed a new form of Zeppelin construction.

The Zeppelin R Class represented a considerable improvement over the previous 22 P Class and 12 Q Class Zeppelins. It was the largest development of the Zeppelin airship during the war. With a length of 198m (cf. 178.5m for the Q Class), a max. diameter of 24m (cf. Q Class 18.7m), and a gas volume of 55,000m^{3} (later 55,200m^{3}; cf. Q Class 35,800m^{3}) spread over 19 gas cells, the performance increased from 96km/h to 103km/h, the range (at 80km/h) from 5,000 to 7,500km, max. altitude from 3,900 to 5,300m, and the potential cargo weight from 15,900 to 28,000 (later also 32,500kg). The R Class was also notable for being the first series with side gondolas, L 30 being the first to be constructed with them, an invention introduced by the Schütte-Lanz SL 2 airship in 1914.

The entire surface of the gondolas was painted gray, with no bare aluminum (silver color was introduced LZ 126).

The airship had 6 engines divided between 4 gondolas with 6 Lorenzen wood-air propellers with a diameter of 5.5m and a pitch of 3.65m. The propellers were located at the rear of the front driver nacelle gondola, at the side gondolas, at the rear of the rear 3 engine gondola and on the two booms. Fuels included 780 liters of oil and 15,828 liters of fuels, housed in 54 discharge gas cylinders, 14 of which were special case gasoline drums. The drop gas barrels were mounted so that gravity could supply fuel to the engines up to an inclination of 30°.

A radio station from Telefunken was on board to determine location by radio signaling, and to communicate with other airships during raids. The remaining station on display at Brussels is likely to have been installed later in 1917 as a modernization; it had an antenna power of 800 Watts, with a range of 1,500km, and consisted of three independent wires with a length of 120 m. The entire radio station including generators and cables weighed a total of 485kg.

For armaments to defend against enemy aircraft, 10 Type 08/15 machine guns with a shortened barrel and water cooling were installed. Three were installed on the bow platform, two each in the driver's gondola and rear gondola, and one in the two side gondolas and in the stern, behind the tailplane. The maximum bomb load was 7,600kg, distributed over 8x300kg explosive bombs, 40x100kg explosive bombs, and 120 fire bombs weighing 10kg each. This was also determined by range and gas lift due to the weather. One degree Celsius change in temperature changed the buoyancy by about 150kg. Although a scouting system has been shown on the drawings of LZ 62 (L 30) and LZ 72 (L 31), this was no longer installed in the maritime airliners. Only on some photos of the military airship LZ 83 (LZ 113) is a fish-shaped scouting-basket visible. Rescue facilities were scarce, and only a few airships had parachutes. On the first R-Class Zeppelins inflatable boats can be seen on the ridge or under the keel.

== Service history ==
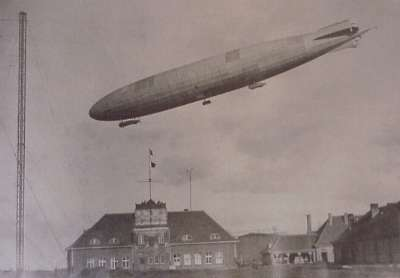
"L 30" flying over Peter Strasser's headquarters in Ahlhorn.

"L 30" was the most successful airship of the Great War: it carried out 31 reconnaissance flights and 10 bombing runs carrying a total of 23,305 kg of bombs. "L 30" was stationed in Nordholz near Cuxhaven from 30 May 1916, in Ahlhorn southwest of Bremen from 21 August 1916, in Tondern from 5 April 1917, and in Seerappen near Königsberg, East Prussia from 2 May 1917. It was taken out of service 17 November 1917 and stored in Seerappen, from where it was broken up in 1920 and parts of it (including gondolas and radio equipment) were sent to Belgium as war reparations.

=== Bombing raids on England from Ahlhorn ===
"L 30" was one of 16 airships taking part in the massive airship raid on England 2–3 September 1916, under von Buttlar-Brandenfels and von Schiller. "L 30" survived the raid, while Zeppelin "SL 11" got shot down.

During the bombing raid on 23-24 September 1916, 8 older Zeppelins were to bomb the Midlands, and 4 newer Zeppelin R-class airships (L 30, L 31, L 32, and L 33) to bomb London. Buttlar-Brandenfels experienced navigational problems however, and failed to cross the coast of England before ditching his cargo of bombs and returning to Germany. L 33 made an emergency landing in England.

On 1 October 1916, von Buttlar-Brandenfels claimed to have dropped bombs over Britain, but the British denied having seen the airship. "L 31", however, was shot down.

=== Operation Albion: Bombing-raids on Livonia and Ösel ===
From 2 May 1917, "L 30" was stationed in Seerappen, 15km west of Königsberg, wherefrom it took part in Operation Albion on the Baltic Front with reconnaissance flights and at least 4 bombing raids, culminating in the Battle of Moon Sound on 17 October, leading to the German conquering of the Estonian islands of Ösel, Dagö and Muhu (then part of the Russian Empire). The German airships were in the operation led by korvettenkäpitan Hans Wendt. In the four known bombing raids, Zeppelin L 37 also took part, which was from 20 September also stationed one month in Seerappen. Three of the raids targeted areas of Livonia, and the fourth targeted the island of Ösel.

==== 7 September 1917: Valmiera and Valka ====
The station towns of Valmiera (German: Wolmar) and Valga (German: Walk) in northern Latvia on the railway connection between Riga and Pskov was bombed by "L 30" on the 7 or 8 September 1917, under Karl von Bödecker from Seerappen, alongside "L 37"" under Paul Gärtner from Seddin near Stolp, and "LZ 113" and "LZ 120" from Wainoden in occupied Curonia.

==== 24 September 1917: Zerel, Ösel ====
Under a new commander, Werner Vermehren, Zeppelin L 30 took part in an attack on the heavily fortified Zerel (Estonian: Sääre) on the southern edge of Ösel (Estonian: Saaremaa), alongside the same four airships (except "L 37" which had been transferred to Seerappen).

==== October 1, 1917: Salismünde ====
The four airships attacked the port town of Salacgrīva (German: Salismünde) on the Salaca River (German: Salis) and surrounding areas in the evening of 1 October 1917. The poorly fortified area was bombarded by L 30 from an altitude of only 4000 feet, to unknown effect.

==== 16 October 1917: Pärnu ====
During the morning of 16 October 1917, L 30 initiated an attack on Pärnu (German: Pernau) on the Parnu River's mouth in the Bay of Riga. According to commander Vermehren, the bombs fell over the city center. Later "LZ 113" and "LZ 120" bombed roads and buildings by the harbor. "L 37" continued the attack later the evening, dropping 2 tons of bombs, but had to return to Seerappen with a serious fire in the bottom center motor-gondola.

=== Decommission ===
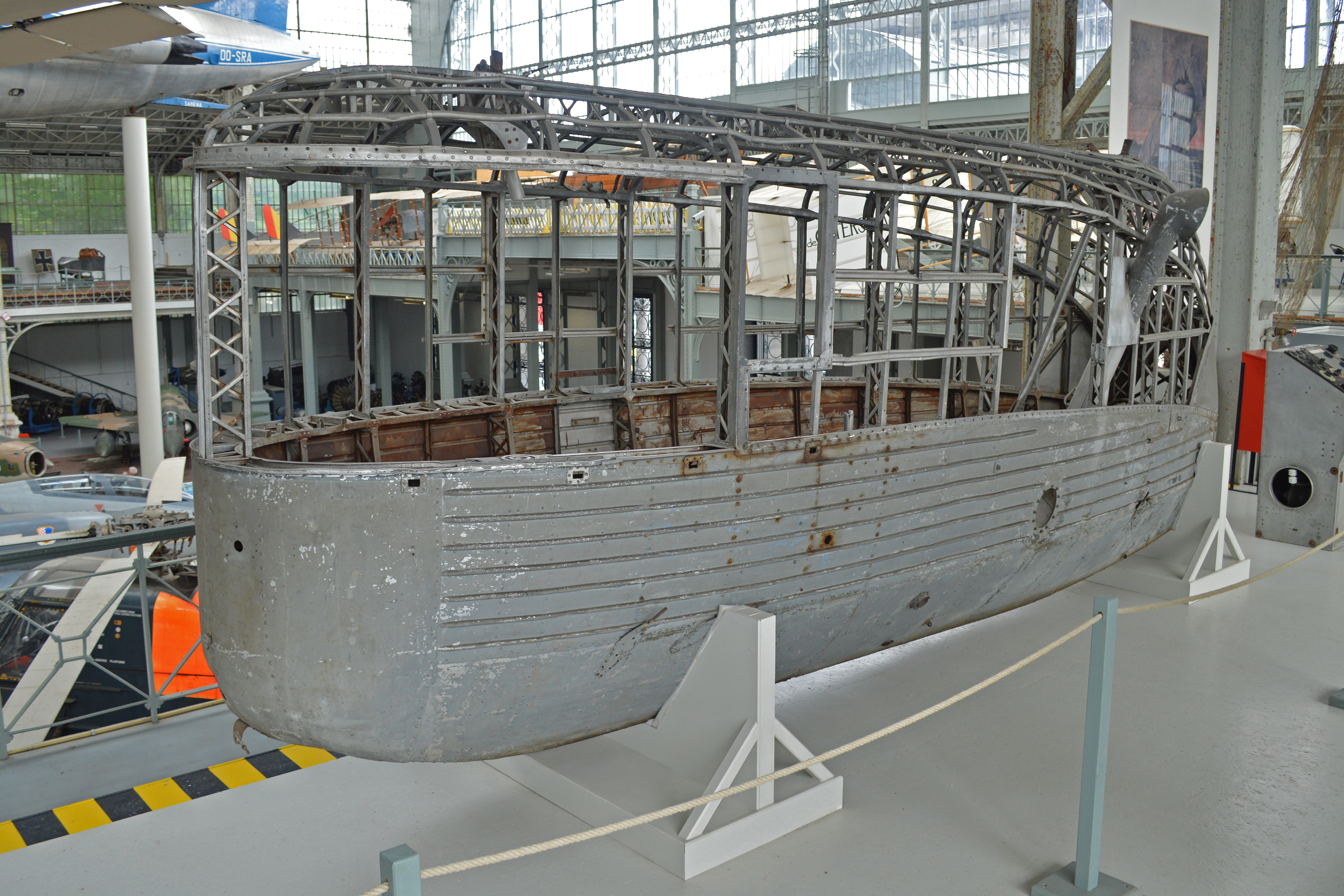
Port-side engine gondola of the L30 on display at the Royal Military Museum, Brussels, 2016

Zeppelin "L 30" was awarded to Belgium as war reparations July 1920, but due to lack of needed infrastructure (i.e. large airship hangars) and the lack of a crew, it was dismantled in Seerappen (now Lyublino, Kaliningrad Oblast), where it had been stored since November 1917. Lecomte, then director of the Royal Museum of the Armed Forces and Military History in Brussels, managed to secure parts of the airship for display.

== History ==
=== Commandants ===
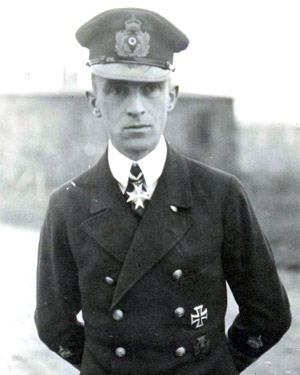
Treusch von Buttlar-Brandenfels, commander of Zeppelin "L 30", wearing the Pour le Mérite, which he received in Tondern 9 April 1918.

Commandants of Zeppelin "L30":

- Kptl.z.S Horst Julius Freiherr Treusch von Buttlar-Brandenfels from 30 May 1916 to 28 December 1916 (57 voyages).
- Oblt.z.S Friemel from 11 Januar 1917. Friemel later commanded L 24, which on 28 December 1916 burned in Tønder.
- Oblt.z.S Karl von Bödecker from 20 April 1917.
- Lt.z.See Werner Vermehren from 16 September 1917. Later commander of L 35.
- Oblt.z.See Karl von Bödecker from 20 November 1917.

=== First officers ===
- Oblt. Hans von Schiller from 30 May 1916 to 28 December 1916 (57 voyages).

== Specifications ==
Specifications:

- Length: 198 m (649 ft 7 in)
- Diameter (max.): 23.9 m (78 ft 5 in)
- Gas volume:55,000 m^{3} (1,900,000 ft^{3})
- Number of gas cells: 19
- Number of gondolas: 4
- Number of propellers: 6 x Lorenzen
- Number of crew members: 17
- Max speed: 103 km/h (28,7 m/s; 62.2 mph)
- Range: 7,400 km (4,600 mi)
- Max altitude: 3,900 m (12,800 ft)
- Payload: 27,721 kg (61,114 lb)
- Empty weight: 36,186 kg (79,776 lb)
- Engines: 6 x Maybach HSLu of 240 hp each. Total: 1440 hp.
- Factory number: LZ 62
- Type: R
- Defensive armaments: 10 x Type 15/08 machine guns
- Suspended armaments: Up to 7,600 kg of bombs

== See also ==
- List of Zeppelins#LZ 62
- German strategic bombing during World War I#1916
