= Zeppelin LZ 76 =

German World War I-era zeppelin

LZ 76 (L 33)
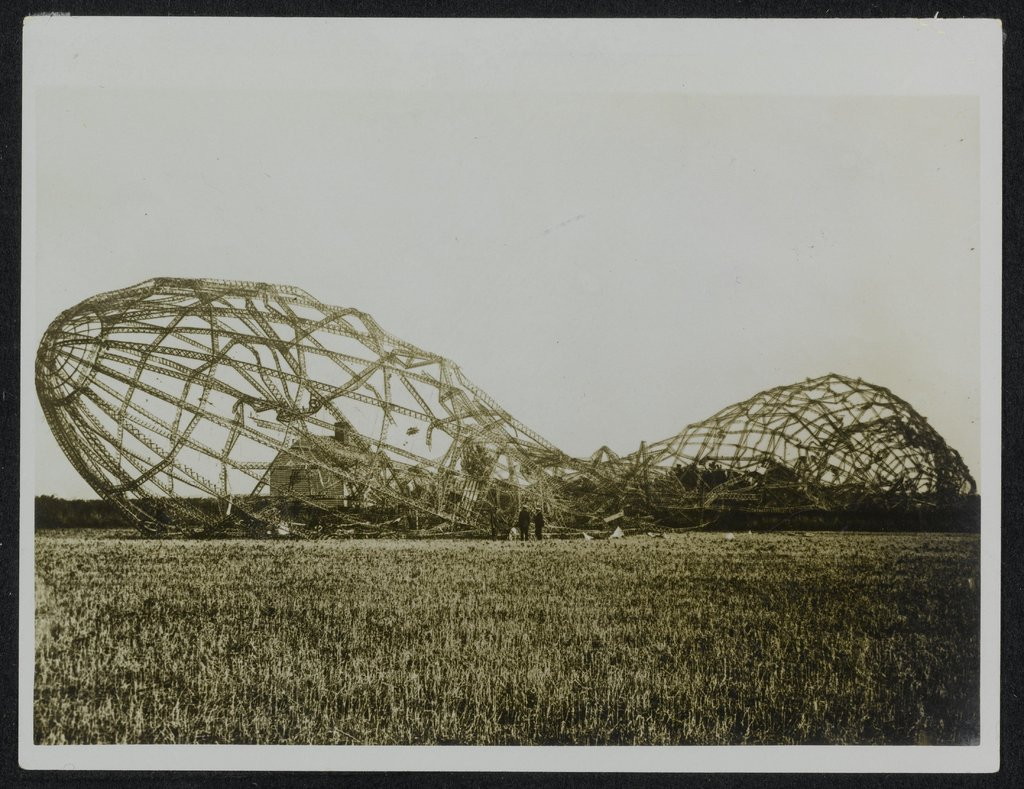
- Imperial German Army Zeppelin LZ 76 brought down near a cottage in Essex

General information
- Type: R-class reconnaissance-bomber rigid airship
- National origin: German Empire
- Manufacturer: Luftschiffbau Zeppelin
- Designer: Ludwig Dürr
- Primary user: Imperial German Navy
- Number built: 1

History
- First flight: 30 August 1916

The Imperial German Army Zeppelin LZ 76 (L-m33) was a R-class World War I zeppelin.

== Operational history ==
On 23 September 1916 a bombing raid was planned for London. That night, a Zeppelin group (LZ 72 [L 31], L 32, L 33 and L 34) set out to complete the mission. They succeeded in dropping 3,200 kilograms (7,100 lb) of bombs on London and surrounding counties. On its first mission, anti-aircraft damaged the LZ 76, and its commander, Kapitan-Leutnant Alois Bocker, changed its course over Essex. It was here that the airship was attacked by 39 Home Defence Squadron night fighters from Hainault Farm. Alfred Brandon was flying a B.E.2e fighter when he attacked Zeppelin LZ 76, helping to bring the airship down in a field. Even after dropping guns and equipment, Bocker calculated that the ship would not make it safely across the North Sea, and he landed in Little Wigborough, Essex, on the morning of 24 September 1916 with no fatalities. Right away, the crew set out to destroy the airship but were only partly successful in burning the hull. British engineers examined the skeleton and later used the plans as a basis for the construction of airships R33 and R34.

== Specifications (LZ 76 / Type R zeppelin) ==
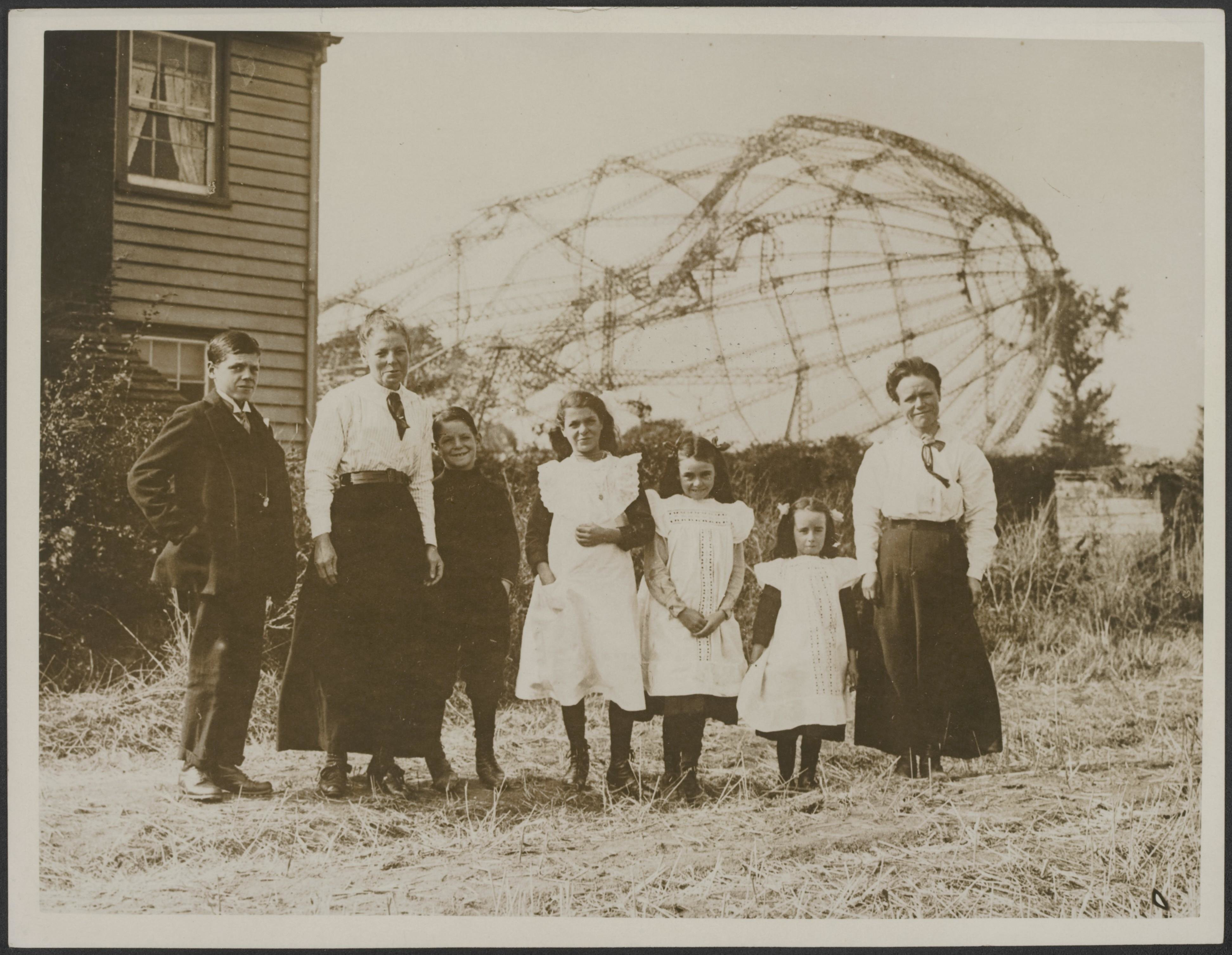
Mrs. Lewis and family photographed with the wreckage of the Zeppelin for a background

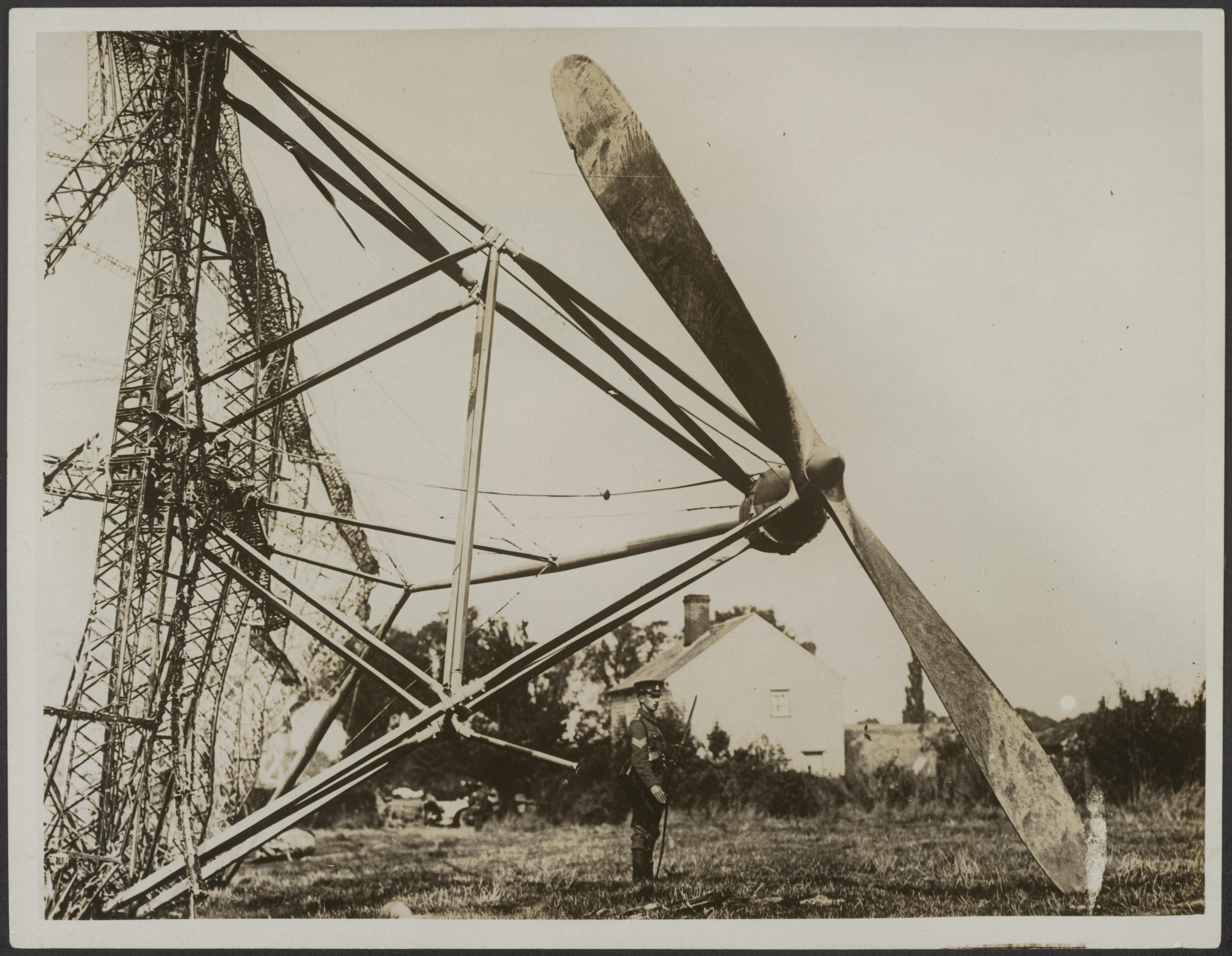
One of the huge propellers

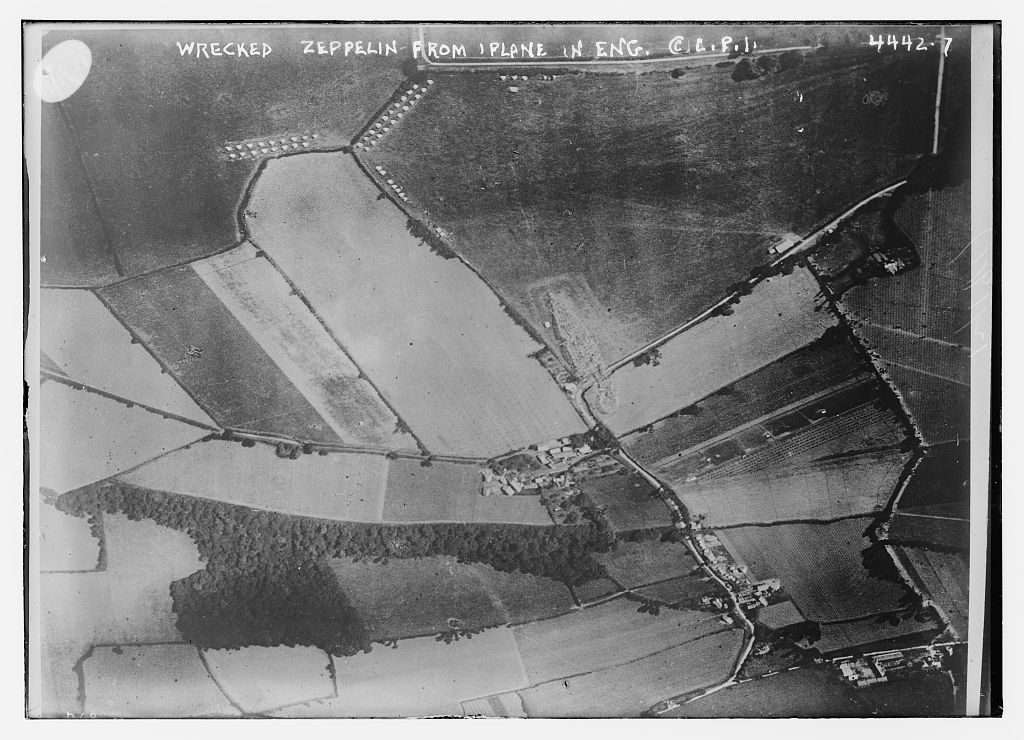
Zeppelin skeleton near Little Wigborough, Essex, near New Hall Farm

Data from Zeppelin: rigid airships, 1893–1940

General characteristics

- Crew: 17-19
- Capacity: 32,400 kg (71,430 lb) typical disposable load
- Length: 198 m (649 ft 7 in)
- Diameter: 23.9 m (78 ft 5 in) maximum
- Fineness ratio: 8.24
- Volume: 55,200 m^{3} (1,950,000 cu ft) in 19 gas cells
- Empty weight: 31,400 kg (69,225 lb)
- Gross weight: 32,908 kg (72,550 lb)
- Fuel capacity: 6,250 kg (13,779 lb)
- Useful lift: 63,800 kg (140,700 lb)
- Powerplant: 5 × Maybach HS Lu 6-cylinder water-cooled in-line piston engines, 180 kW (240 hp) each
- Propellers: 4-bladed Lorenzen fixed-pitch propellers

Performance

- Maximum speed: 103 km/h (64 mph, 56 kn)
- Cruise speed: 81 km/h (50 mph, 44 kn)
- Range: 7,400 km (4,600 mi, 4,000 nmi) at 81 km/h (50 mph; 44 kn)
- Service ceiling: 3,900 m (12,800 ft) static
- Rate of climb: 10 m/s (2,000 ft/min) maximum permitted (r-class)

Armament

- Guns: machine-guns in hull-top positions and gondolas
- Bombs: up to 60 bombs to a total of 5,000 kg (11,023 lb)

== See also ==
- List of Zeppelins
