= Zeppelin LZ 45 =

Zeppelin airship

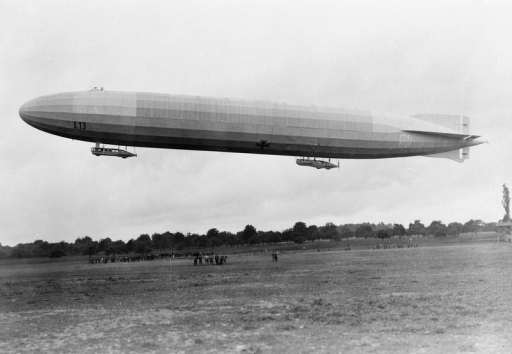
Navy airship L 13

The Zeppelin LZ 45 was the 45th airship built by Count Zeppelin and the thirteenth operated by the Imperial German Navy under the military designation L 13.

== History ==
LZ 45 made its first flight on 23 July 1915 and was taken over by the Navy as L 13. L 13 carried out numerous bombing raids on England as well as reconnaissance missions over the North Sea. It was also used to support the departure of German submarines. Its main base was located in Hage. On the night of 8–9 September 1915, L 13 carried out the first air raid on the center of London, causing extensive damage. Textile warehouses north of St Paul's Cathedral caught fire, resulting in damages amounting to £530,000.

A second attack on London was launched on 13 September 1915, but thick cloud cover and heavy fog complicated the approach. During the mission, the airship was hit by artillery fire in the gangway between the gondolas, damaging the radio equipment, causing gas loss, and rupturing a fuel line. As a result, the Zeppelin was forced to turn back and dropped its bomb load over Dutch territory to lighten the ship. Additionally, 1.3 tons of fuel and other equipment were jettisoned to keep the airship airborne. L 13 was able to return to its home base and was repaired within four days.

On 18 August 1916, during the German High Seas Fleet's attempt at a second major naval battle following the Battle of Jutland in May 1916, L 13 spotted part of the British fleet and reported its position via radio to Admiral Reinhard Scheer (see Action of 19 August 1916). However, contact with the British fleet was lost in a thunderstorm, prompting Scheer to call off the pursuit.

In total, L 13 completed 45 reconnaissance missions and 15 bombing raids, dropping a total of 20,667 kg of bombs. As the airship became outdated, LZ 45 / L 13 was decommissioned on 25 April 1917 and dismantled.

== Technical specifications ==
- Gas volume: 31,900 m^{3} of hydrogen
- Length: 163.00 m
- Diameter: 18.70 m
- Payload: 16.2 t
- Propulsion: Four Maybach engines, each producing 210 PS
- Speed: 26.7 m/s

== See also ==
- List of Zeppelins
