= Wulstan Tempest =

British military officer

Wulstan Joseph Tempest
- Born: 22 January 1891; Ackworth, Yorkshire, England
- Died: 1966 (aged 74–75)
- Military career
- Allegiance: United Kingdom
- Branch: British Army; Royal Air Force
- Service years: 1914–1919
- Rank: Major
- Units: King's Own Yorkshire Light Infantry; No. 39 Squadron RFC
- Commands: No. 100 Squadron RFC/RAF; No. 36 Squadron RAF; No. 101 Squadron RAF
- Conflicts: World War I • Western Front
- Awards: Distinguished Service Order; Military Cross

Major Wulstan Joseph Tempest, DSO, MC (22 January 1891 – 1966) was a British First World War pilot with the Royal Flying Corps and Royal Air Force. He was celebrated for shooting down a Zeppelin R Class airship over Potters Bar in October 1916.

== Early life and family background ==
Wulstan Tempest was born in Ackworth, Yorkshire, in 1891. He was the ninth child, and the sixth son, of Wilfrid Francis Tempest, a member of the notable recusant Tempest family, and his second wife Florence Helen O'Rourke (Wilfrid had a total of 15 children from two marriages). He was a descendant of George Plantagenet, 1st Duke of Clarence, the great-grandson of King Edward III. His father was a wealthy landowner and justice of the peace, serving as Chairman of the West Riding Bench for the Pontefract Division.

Tempest was educated at Stonyhurst College, where he won distinction in mathematics, then spent three years training for the merchant service at HMS Worcester. He worked as a mining engineer, and spent a few months as a sugar farmer in South Africa, before moving to Canada in 1911 with his brother Edmund to farm in Perdue, Saskatchewan, but they returned to England to enlist in October 1914.

== World War I ==
Tempest was commissioned as a second lieutenant in the King's Own Yorkshire Light Infantry, with seniority from 30 November 1914. His battalion was sent to France in May 1915, where he saw action during the Second Battle of Ypres in April, which marked the first large-scale use by the Germans of chlorine gas on the Western Front. Suffering from the effects of gassing Tempest was invalided home to recuperate. He returned to his battalion in July, but was then transferred to a garrison battalion based at Newcastle. In early 1916 he transferred to the Royal Flying Corps to train as a pilot, receiving his Royal Aero Club Aviators Certificate in April, and on 17 June he was appointed a flying officer in the RFC, and transferred to the General List.

=== Shooting down a Zeppelin ===
Tempest was posted to No. 39 (Home Defence) Squadron. This unit was based at RFC North Weald in Essex, and flew a mixture of B.E.2 and B.E.12 aircraft. It was specifically formed to defend London from German air raids, and had several successes. On 2/3 September 1916, Lieutenant Leefe Robinson destroyed SL.11, becoming the first British pilot to bring down a German airship, and winning the Victoria Cross. On 23/24 September Second Lieutenant Frederick Sowrey destroyed Zeppelin L.32, which crashed in flames at Billericay, and Second Lieutenant Alfred Brandon damaged Zeppelin L.33 sufficiently for her crew to make a forced landing at Little Wigborough, and set her on fire.

At 23:45 on 1 October 1916, Tempest was on patrol about 15,000 ft (4,600 m) over South-West London flying B.E.2c night fighter, serial number "4557", having taken off from North Weald around 22:00. Meanwhile, Zeppelin L.31, commanded by Kapitänleutnant Heinrich Mathy had flown across the North Sea, and crossed the English coast at Lowestoft, but was unable to penetrate London's defences, coming under heavy anti-aircraft fire. L.31 dropped most of her bombs over Cheshunt, but was then captured by searchlights. Tempest spotted the airship 15 miles (24 km) in the distance and immediately set a course to intercept her. As he approached his fuel tank pressure pump failed, and he was forced to use the hand pump to keep his engine operating. He eventually closed with the airship, running the gauntlet of anti-aircraft fire. Approaching from the bows he fired a burst into her, then dived underneath firing another burst, seeing his incendiary bullets ripping through the airship's fabric skin, before turning to make another pass from the tail. He momentarily saw a red glow illuminate the Zeppelin from within "like an enormous Chinese lantern" before flames erupted from the bows. Tempest span away to avoid being hit by flames and debris as the airship plunged to the ground, crashing at Potters Bar. Exhausted by his exertions and the bitter cold Tempest crashed his aircraft on landing, cracking his skull against the butt of his machine gun. The next day he travelled to Potters Bar to survey the wreck of L.31, but the area was cordoned off by the Army, and he was obliged to pay a shilling to see the wreckage from an adjoining farm.

Two weeks later, on 13 October Tempest was made a companion of the Distinguished Service Order, "...in recognition of conspicuous gallantry and devotion to duty in connection with the destruction of an Enemy Airship."

His portrait appears on a postcard, titled Three Zepp. Wreckers (William Leefe Robinson; Wulstan Joseph Tempest; Frederick Sowrey), in a portrait photograph for the Rotary Photographic Co. Ltd., taken in late 1916.

=== Later war service ===
On 25 January 1917 Tempest was mentioned in despatches "...for distinguished services rendered in connection with the War".

In February 1917 he was transferred to the newly formed No. 100 Squadron RFC, a bomber squadron flying a mixture of F.E.2b and B.E.2e aircraft, and on 1 March he was promoted to lieutenant. The squadron soon crossed to France, flying its first mission on the night of 5/6 April, attacking Douai aerodrome. That summer the squadron saw action during the battles of Vimy Ridge, Arras, Messines, and third Ypres, gaining a reputation for energy and efficiency, while on 27 June Tempest was appointed a flight commander with the temporary rank of captain.

On 18 October Tempest was awarded the Military Cross. His citation, gazetted on 5 March 1918, read:

Temporary Second Lieutenant (Temporary Captain) Wulstan Joseph Tempest, DSO, General List and Royal Flying Corps.

"For conspicuous gallantry and devotion to duty on many occasions. He has successfully bombed railway sidings and aerodromes, often in misty and cloudy weather, and at a low altitude, causing much damage to his objectives. On one occasion he descended to a very low altitude and dropped bombs on two moving trains, causing them both to be derailed. This officer has taken part in thirty-four night bombing raids."

The same month his squadron become part of the Independent Air Force, and was relocated to Ochey aerodrome to fly strategic bombing missions over Germany, attacking munitions factories in the Rhine towns. On 15 December 1917 Tempest was appointed squadron commander with the temporary rank of major, taking command of his squadron. In March 1918, during the German spring offensive, No. 100 Squadron was temporarily moved to an aerodrome near Rheims, flying tactical missions against German lines of communication, before returning to Ochey and the Independent Air Force. In June, Tempest handed over command of No. 100 Squadron to Major C. Gordon Burge.

In July 1918 Tempest took command of No. 36 Squadron, a training unit flying the Sopwith Pup and Bristol F.2 fighters, based at RAF Usworth near Sunderland. From January 1919 until March 1919 he commanded No. 101 Squadron, a night bomber unit flying the F.E.2b, based in France and Belgium. He was transferred to the RAF unemployed list on 1 August 1919.

== Personal life ==
Of his brothers, Major Wilfred Norman Tempest, 2nd Battalion (attached 9th Battalion), King's Own Yorkshire Light Infantry, was killed in action on 26 September 1916, and is commemorated on the Thiepval Memorial. Flight Lieutenant Edmund Roger Tempest, also served in the King's Own Yorkshire Light Infantry before transferring to the RFC, and was credited with 17 aircraft shot down while serving in No. 64 Squadron. He was killed in a flying accident in 1921.

In May 1919 Tempest became engaged to Camille Millicent Best, of Brussels, but eventually married Ethel Fernandes on 5 April 1923 at All Saints' Church, Ennismore Gardens, London.

Tempest died in 1966, and is commemorated in the names of two streets in Potters Bar near Oakmere Park, "Tempest Avenue" and "Wulstan Park", close to where the L.31 crashed.

== Memorial service ==
On 1 October 2016 the 100th anniversary of the shooting down of L.31 was marked by a memorial service with a fly-past by a replica B.E.2c aircraft, and wreaths were laid by the Mayor of Hertsmere and the German Air Attaché in memory of the nineteen German crewmen who were killed.
