= Zeppelin P Class =

1915 German airship class

P Class
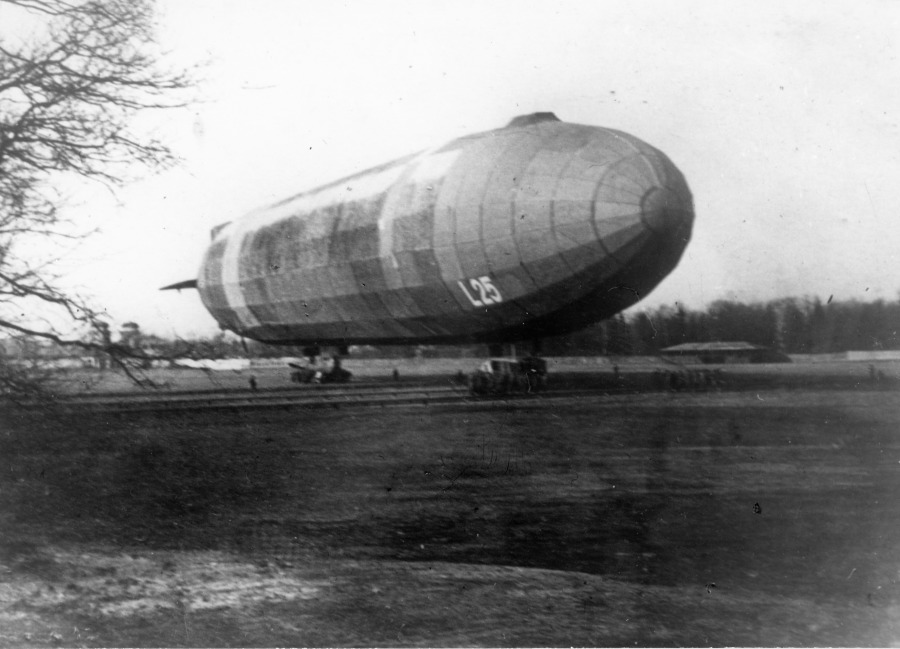
- P-Class LZ 58

General information
- Type: Bomber and patrol airship
- National origin: Germany
- Manufacturer: Zeppelin Luftschiffbau
- Designer: Ludwig Dürr
- Primary user: German Navy; German Army
- Number built: 22

History
- First flight: 3 May 1915

The Zeppelin P Class was the first Zeppelin airship type to be produced in quantity after the outbreak of the First World War. Twenty-two of the type were built as well as twelve of a lengthened version, the Q Class. They were used for many of the airship bombing raids on the United Kingdom in 1915–16, for naval patrol work over the North Sea and Baltic and were also deployed on the eastern and south-eastern fronts.

== Design ==
The P class was an enlarged version of the preceding M class. On 5 August 1914 the Zeppelin company put forward a proposal to the German Navy Ministry for a design based on LZ 26. This had been started as a passenger carrying craft for DELAG and was the first Zeppelin with a duralumin framework, and also had the strengthening keel inside the hull structure. The proposed design was larger, with the volume increased from 24,900 to 31,900 m^{3} (880,000 to 1,126,000 ft^{3}) and a fourth engine was added. As well as being larger, allowing a greater range and bomb load, the P class introduced enclosed crew accommodation: the gondolas of the first M class Zeppelins were open.

The P class had a more streamlined hull shape than previous Zeppelins, with only 60 m (197 ft) of the 163.5 m (536 ft) overall length being parallel sided. Power was initially provided by four 160 kW (210 hp) Maybach CX six cylinder engines. Later examples were fitted with four 180 kW (240 hp) Maybach HSLu engines. The framework was divided into sixteen 10 m (33 ft) bays, with an intermediate frame between each of the principal wire-braced ring frames to reduce lateral loads on the triangular section longitudinal girders, of which there were 17, the uppermost of which was doubled to form a W-section girder. The 16 gasbags were usually made from three layers of goldbeater's skin on a cotton backing, but shortages meant that sometimes heavier rubberised cotton was used instead. Automatic pressure relief valves were placed at the bottom of the gasbags: there was no trunking to carry vented hydrogen to the top of the craft and waste gas simply diffused upwards in the space between gasbags and the covering, whose top surface was left undoped to allow the hydrogen to escape. Some gasbags were also fitted with a manually operated manoeuvering valve at the top. The ship was controlled from the forward gondola, which was divided into two structurally separate sections in order to avoid transmission of engine vibration to the crew accommodation: the small gap between the two sections was faired over with fabric. The forward section was divided into three compartments, with the control area at the front; aft of this was the radio compartment, and then the officer's rest area, the windows of which had a machine-gun mounting either side. The engine compartment contained a single engine driving a propeller at the rear through a reduction gear. The aft engine gondola carried three engines arranged in line, the aft engine driving a propeller at the back of the gondola and the other two driving a pair of propellers mounted either side of the hull. These were reversible to aid manoeuvering during mooring. As in the forward gondola, a machine-gun mounting was fitted either side. Further defensive armament consisted of a single machine gun in a small cockpit at the stern behind the rudders and a gun position mounting two or three machine guns on top of the hull, which was reached by a ladder from the forward gondola. The bomb load was slung from the keel girders, the bombs being electrically released from the control car.

In late 1915, faced by increasingly effective defensive measures, Zeppelin introduced the Q class. The hull was lengthened by 15 metres (49 ft), increasing volume to 35,800 cubic metres (1,264,100 ft^{3}) and the operating ceiling by about 460 metres (1,500 ft). Many of the existing P class airships were similarly lengthened.

== Service history ==
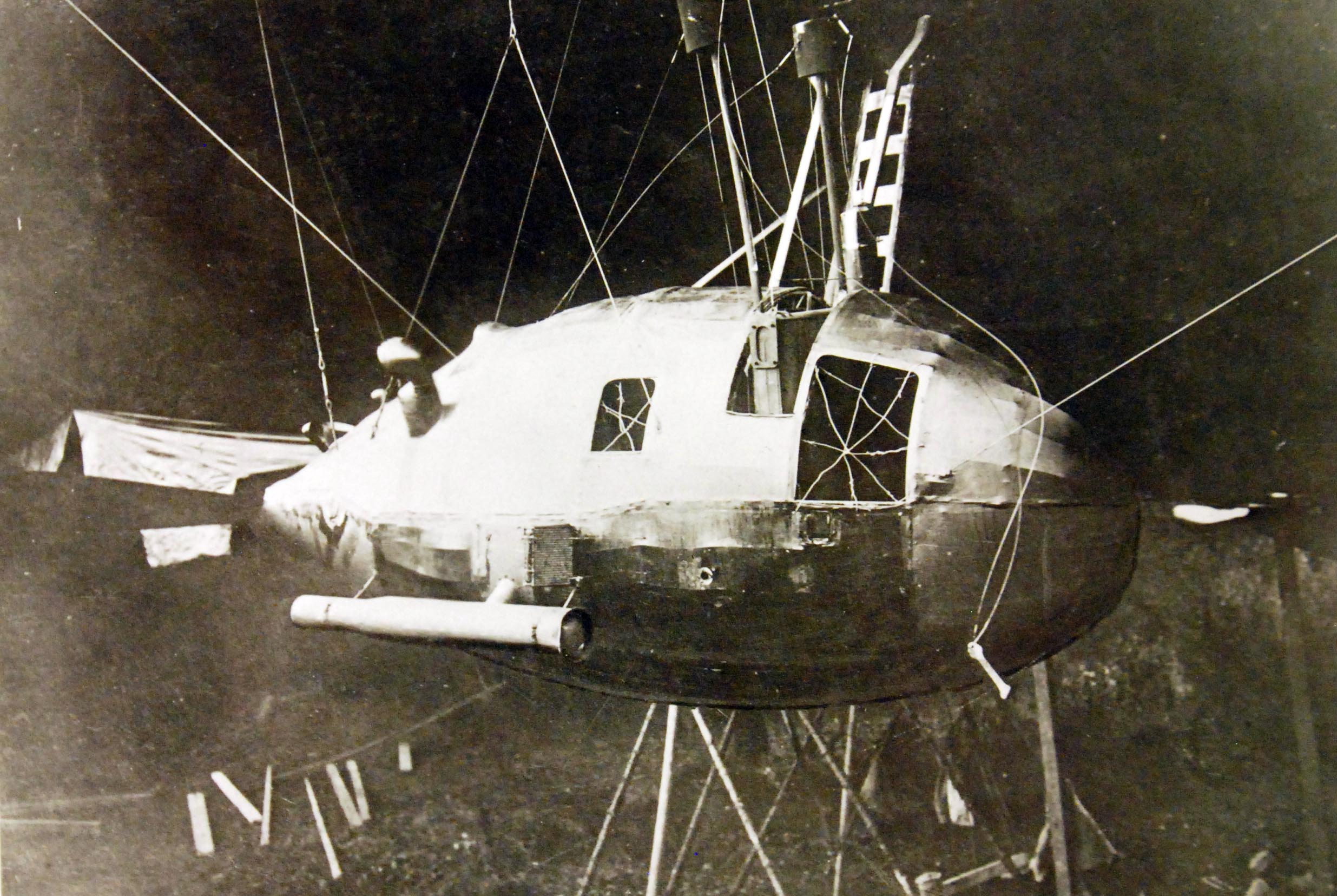
Wreckage of Zeppelin LZ 49 (LZ 79) after being forced down.

P and Q class Zeppelins were operated by both the German Army and the Navy. Although the bombing raids are their best known activity, the majority of the flights made by the naval craft were patrols over the North Sea and the Baltic. The class was obsolete by 1917 and most of the craft that had not been lost to accidents or enemy action had been dismantled by the end of September 1917. The last survivors were LZ 50 (L 16), which had been relegated to training duties and was wrecked at the Nordholz base on 19 October 1917. and LZ 46 (L 14), which carried out 42 reconnaissance missions and 17 attacks on Britain. It survived the war and was destroyed by its crew on 23 June 1919.

The first P class Zeppelin constructed was LZ 38, assigned to the Army and first flown on 3 May 1915. After a series of raids on the East coast of England, it became the first airship to bomb London on 31 May 1915, dropping 1,400 kilograms (3,000 lb) of bombs on an eastern suburb of London, killing seven people. A consequence of this raid was that reporting restrictions were introduced in England. Formerly press coverage contained detailed accounts of the location of bombing raids: after this, only generalised locations were published. It carried out five raids on England, before it was destroyed when its shed at Evere was bombed on 7 June 1915.

LZ 40 (L 10) was the first P class flown by the Navy, and bombed London on 4 June 1915. It took part in five raids and made eight reconnaissance flights: on 3 September 1915 it was struck by lightning and crashed in flames in the North Sea near Neuwerk, Germany, with the loss of the entire 20-man crew.

On 8 September 1915 LZ 45 (L 13), commanded by Heinrich Mathy, was the first Zeppelin to bomb central London, setting fire to textile warehouses to the north of St Paul's Cathedral and causing over half a million pounds worth of damage, around one sixth of all material damage caused by the bombing of Britain during the war.

LZ 47 (LZ 77) and LZ 49 (LZ 79) were deployed to Namur in order to carry out a bombing raid on Paris. LZ 49 (LZ 79) bombed Paris on the 29/30 of January, but was damaged by ground fire and was destroyed in a forced landing at Ath in Belgium. The Army Zeppelins were then used to support the German army in the early phases of the battle of Verdun. On 21 February, the first day of the German offensive, four of the six available Zeppelins set out to bomb the French supply lines. LZ 65 (LZ 95), the first Q class Zeppelin, was badly damaged by anti-aircraft fire and was destroyed in a crash landing at the base in Namur. The P class LZ 47 (LZ 77) was hit by anti-aircraft fire over Revigny, catching fire and killing the crew of 11, and LZ 58 (LZ 88) was forced to return to its base by squalls and snow showers.

On the night of 2 - 3 April 1916, LZ 46 (L 14) attacked the city of Edinburgh and its port town of Leith in the first ever air raid over Scotland, dropping 25 high explosive and 19 incendiary bombs. Thirteen people were killed and 24 injured in the attack. A number of buildings were damaged, the most severe being inflicted on a bonded warehouse in Leith which burned down. Two bombs came close to Edinburgh Castle and as a result the Regalia of Scotland was subsequently moved to the castle vaults for safe keeping.

The Army airships LZ 85 and LZ 86 were deployed to the Eastern front. LZ 85 made two successful attacks on Salonika but during a third raid was damaged by fire from HMS Agamemnon on 5 May 1916 and came down in the Vardar marshes. The crew of 12 were captured. The framework was salvaged and, partially reconstructed, put on display near the White Tower in Salonika.

LZ 51 (LZ 81) was deployed on the Balkan front, and was used to transport diplomats across hostile Serbia to Sofia on 9 November 1915. Subsequently, it made two attacks on Bucharest: it was eventually brought down by ground fire near Turnovo in Bulgaria on 27 September 1916.

== P-class airships ==
LZ 38
(military serial no. - LZ 38) Imperial German Army
LZ 40
(military serial no. - L10) Imperial German Navy
LZ 41
(military serial no. - L11) Imperial German Navy
LZ 42
(military serial no. - LZ 72) Imperial German Army
LZ 43
(military serial no. - L12) Imperial German Navy
LZ 44
(military serial no. - LZ 74) Imperial German Army
LZ 45
(military serial no. - L13) Imperial German Navy
LZ 46
(military serial no. - L14) Imperial German Navy
LZ 47
(military serial no. - LZ 77) Imperial German Army
LZ 48
(military serial no. - L15) Imperial German Navy
LZ 49
(military serial no. - LZ 79) Imperial German Army
LZ 50
(military serial no. - L16) Imperial German Navy
LZ 51
(military serial no. - LZ 81) Imperial German Army
LZ 51A
(military serial no. - LZ 81) Imperial German Army - converted from LZ 51

LZ 52
(military serial no. - L18) Imperial German Navy
LZ 53
(military serial no. - L17) Imperial German Navy
LZ 54
(military serial no. - L19) Imperial German Navy
LZ 55
(military serial no. - LZ 85) Imperial German Army
LZ 56
(military serial no. - LZ 86) Imperial German Army
LZ 56A
(military serial no. - LZ 86) Imperial German Army - converted from LZ 56
LZ 57
(military serial no. - LZ 87) Imperial German Army
LZ 57A
(military serial no. - LZ 87) Imperial German Army - converted from LZ 57
LZ 58
(military serial no. - LZ 88) Imperial German Army
LZ 58A
(military serial no. - LZ 88) Imperial German Army - converted from LZ 58
LZ 60
(military serial no. - LZ 90) Imperial German Army
LZ 60A
(military serial no. - LZ 90) Imperial German Army - converted from LZ 60
LZ 63
(military serial no. - LZ 93 ) Imperial German Army
LZ 63A
(military serial no. - LZ 93) Imperial German Army - converted from LZ 63

== Specifications ==
Data from Robinson 1973.

General characteristics

- Crew: 19 (Executive Officer, Commander, Navigator, Sailmaker (responsible for gasbags), Chief Engineer, 2 altitude coxswains, 2 steering coxswains, 8 engineers)
- Length: 163.50 m (536 ft 5 in)
- Diameter: 18.69 m (61 ft 4 in)
- Volume: 32,920 m^{3} (1,162,400 cu ft)
- Powerplant: 4 × Maybach 3M C-X 6-cylinder inline piston engine, 160 kW (210 hp) each

Performance

- Maximum speed: 92 km/h (57 mph, 50 kn)
- Cruise speed: 63 km/h (39 mph, 34 kn)
- Service ceiling: 3,500 m (11,600 ft)

Armament

- Guns: 7 or 8 machine guns: naval airships generally using the water-cooled MG 08, army ships the air-cooled Parabellum MG 14
- Bombs: 2,000 kg (4,400 lb) bombs (a greater load could be carried with reduced fuel load)
