= Zeppelin R Class =

Type of rigid airship

R Class
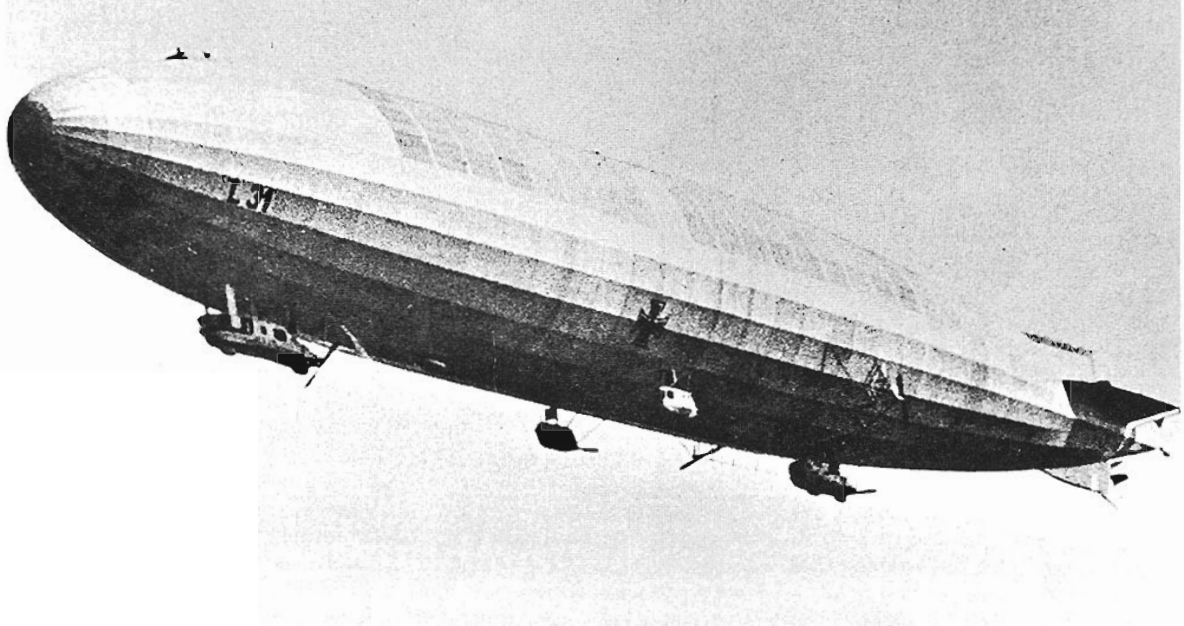
- L 31 (LZ 72), an R-class Zeppelin, in flight

General information
- Type: Bomber and patrol airship
- National origin: Germany
- Manufacturer: Zeppelin Luftschiffbau
- Designer: Ludwig Dürr
- Primary user: Imperial German Navy; German Army
- Number built: 17

History
- First flight: 28 May 1916

The Zeppelin R Class was a type of rigid airship developed by Zeppelin Luftschiffbau in 1916 for use by the Imperial German Navy and the German Army for bombing and naval patrol work. Introduced in July 1916 at a time when British air defences were becoming increasingly capable, several were lost in the first months of operation, leading the Germans to reconsider their technical requirements and eventually to develop airships capable of bombing from a greater height. Most surviving examples were modified to meet these requirements, by reducing weight at the expense of performance. A total of 17 were built.

== Background ==
Work on the R class started in March 1915, when the German Navy asked both Zeppelin and Schütte-Lanz to prepare studies for a new class of airship which would be limited in size by the existing sheds. The proposals were rejected by the Navy's aviation department, and a decision was made to design a new class of six-engined airships regardless of size. Double sheds at Tondern and Seddin were to be lengthened and six new double hangars would be constructed, four of them at a new base at Ahlhorn. A new large assembly shed was built at Friedrichshafen, and a second Zeppelin factory at Staaken near Berlin was established.

== Design and development ==
Influenced by aerodynamicist Paul Jaray, the hull shape was more streamlined than the preceding P class, although traditionalists in the company insisted that a portion of the hull should be parallel sided to prevent instability. The structure consisted of 20 wire braced 13-sided transverse frames, all but the rear three and front two frames made up of kingpost-braced girders. These were spaced 10 m (32 ft 10 in) apart, with an intermediate frame in the middle of each bay, and were attached to a triangular section ventral keel, the apex of which was braced to the ends of the outer ends of the lower transverse frame girders on each side. The transverse frames were connected by 13 principal longitudinal girders, of which the one at the top of the hull was a more substantial W-section girder. There were secondary longitudinal girders between the principal girders. A central axial bracing cable running the length of the hull was fitted to reduce the load on the transverse bracing of the mainframes in the case of the deflation of a single gasbag. This feature was the subject of a Schütte Lanz patent, and had not previously been used by Zeppelin.

As in the preceding P and Q classes, the forward control car contained a single engine driving a pusher propeller and an aft engine car contained three engines, one driving a pusher propeller at the rear of the car and the other two driving propellers mounted on brackets on either side of the hull via driveshafts: these were reversible. Unlike the previous design, which had the three engines mounted in line, the two engines driving the hull-mounted propellers were side by side. The additional two engines were carried in small engine cars either side of the hull, accessed by a catwalk from the keel gangway.

The bomb load was carried in a compartment in the centre of the keel. The keel also accommodated the rubberised canvas ballast bags and the main fuel tanks, which could be jettisoned in an emergency. Fuel was pumped from these tanks to individual gravity tanks above each engine car. As a legacy of the loss of the crew of LZ 54 (L 19), two lightweight lifeboats, made of canvas stretched over a wooden frame, were carried. A total of 10 machine guns were carried as defensive armament: three in the forward platform on top of the hull, one in an aft gun position behind the rudders, two in both the forward and aft gondolas and one in each of the wing cars either side of the hull.

Following the loss of four of the first R class Zeppelins to be built during raids on England, a decision was made to develop airships capable of operating at greater altitude, and most of the remaining R class were modified in order to reduce weight: one engine was removed from the aft gondola, the defensive armament was removed and the bomb load reduced by half. This increased the ceiling to over 4,900 m (16,100 ft) Later an improved streamlined rear gondola was fitted.

== Service history ==
The R class was brought into service at a time when the air defences of Britain were becoming much more capable, with the introduction of mixture of explosive and incendiary rounds used by the defending aircraft. Four were lost during raids on England before the end of the year. The first R class to be constructed was LZ 62 (L 30), first flown on 28 May 1916 and commissioned two days later, when it was flown to Nordholz carrying Count Zeppelin as a passenger. After taking part in nine bombing raids and making 31 patrol flights it was decommissioned in November 1917: it was broken up in 1920.

By the end of November the next four to be constructed had all been shot down while bombing England. On 24 September LZ 76 (L 33), its gasbags holed by antiaircraft fire, came down at Little Wigborough. Although the crew tried to set fire to it, little hydrogen was left in its gasbags and examination of the wreckage provided the British with a great deal of information about airship construction, which was used in the design of the R33-class airships. The same night LZ 74 (L 32) was shot down in flames over Billericay. On 2 October LZ 72 (L 31), which had been commissioned on 14 July and was commanded by Heinrich Mathy, the most successful airship captain of the war, was shot down in flames over Potters Bar by Lt. Wulstan Tempest, and on 27–28 November L 34 was brought down in flames off the coast at Hartlepool by 2nd Lt. Ian Pyott.

In December 1916 LZ 84 (L 38) and LZ 80 (L 35) were transferred to Wainoden in order to attempt to bomb St. Petersburg. L 38 was forced down by adverse weather conditions and damaged beyond repair, while L 35, hampered by failure of one engine and problems with the others caused by the extreme cold, turned back before it reached the target. No further attempt to bomb St Petersburg was made.

The first raid by the modified high altitude R class airships was made on the night of 16–17 March 1917, when L 35, L 39, L 40 and L 41, accompanied by L 42, the first S class Zeppelin, attempted to bomb London. Flying at over 5,200 m (17,100 ft) they encounted unexpected high winds, and navigational difficulties were encountered because of cloud cover and British jamming of the German radio frequencies, which disabled radio direction finding. Damage was insignificant, and the wind made the return journey difficult: L 39, probably a victim of engine failure, was blown over France and eventually shot down by antiaircraft fire near Compiègne. Another raid on May 23–4 by L 40, L 45, L 47 together with the S-class airships L 42 and L 43 and the T class L 44 was also ineffective, with no airships reaching London.

Three R class zeppelins L 30 and L 31 and L 32 were among the reconnaissance force deployed as part of the Sunderland raid on 19 August. The Zeppelins did not distinguish themselves: although the British Grand Fleet was spotted by L 31 it was mistaken for a smaller force and due to a temporary course change it was not reported as being a threat. The older L 13, part of the southern patrol group, spotted the Harwich Force, but mistook it for a more powerful formation: this caused Scheer to change course in an attempt to intercept it, so avoiding an encounter with the Grand Fleet.

L 35, after taking part in 5 bombing raids and making 14 patrols over the North Sea, was withdrawn from combat operations in September 1917 and used for experimental flights. These included a trial in which an Albatros D.III fighter aeroplane was suspended below the ship and released at altitude: the intention was to use this to defend the airship against British seaplane patrols over the North Sea. Although the single trial, made on 25 January 1918, was successful Peter Strasser did not consider that the idea was useful unless a suitable seaplane could be developed, and the experiment was not repeated.

LZ 90, one of the two examples flown by the Army and given the Army designation LZ 120, made a notable endurance flight in 1917; under the command of Ernst Lehmann it took off from Seerappen on 26 July with a crew of 29, and flew over the Baltic for 101 hours, returning to its base because a storm was expected. When it landed it still had enough fuel for 14 hours flight. LZ 120 survived the war and was handed over to Italy as war reparations: it was destroyed when a storm wrecked its shed at Ciampino in June 1921.

== See also ==
- German strategic bombing during World War I

== Specifications ==
Data from Douglas Robinson, Giants in the Sky, p.120

General characteristics

- Crew: 21
- Length: 196.49 m (644 ft 8 in) The first two examples were about 1.5 m (4.9 ft) longer.
- Diameter: 23.90 m (78 ft 5 in)
- Volume: 55,210 m^{3} (1,949,600 cu ft)
- Empty weight: 36,106 kg (79,600 lb) L 30. Weights varied.
- Useful lift: 64,000 kg (141,200 lb) L 30
- Powerplant: 6 × Maybach HSLu 6-cylinder inline piston engine, 180 kW (240 hp) each

Performance

- Maximum speed: 100.6 km/h (62.5 mph, 54.3 kn) (Typical figure: trial speed of individual examples varied slightly)
- Endurance: 36 hours
- Service ceiling: 4,000 m (13,000 ft)

Armament

- Guns: 10 machine guns: naval airships generally using the water-cooled MG 08, army ships the air-cooled Parabellum MG 14
- Bombs: ~ (5 lt)
