= No. 39 Squadron RAF =

Flying squadron of the Royal Air Force

- Squadron badge
- Active: 1916–1918 (RFC); 1918; 1919–1946; 1948–1949; 1949–1958; 1958–1982; 1992–2006; 2007–2022
- Disbanded: July 2022
- Country: United Kingdom
- Branch: Royal Air Force
- Type: Flying squadron
- Mottos: Die noctuque (Latin for 'By day and night')

Insignia
- Roundel
- Tail codes: SF (Apr 1939 – Sep 1939) (allocated but probably not carried); XZ (Sep 1939 – Dec 1940); AA–AZ (Canberras)

Number 39 Squadron is an inactive squadron of the Royal Air Force. It last operated the General Atomics MQ-9A Reaper from Creech AFB, Nevada, between January 2007 and July 2022. It had previously operated the English Electric Canberra PR.7, PR.9 and T.4 from RAF Marham, Norfolk, as No. 39 (1 Photographic Reconnaissance Unit) Squadron between July 1992 and July 2006.

== History ==
=== First World War ===
No. 39 Squadron was founded at Hounslow Heath Aerodrome on 15 April 1916 with Royal Aircraft Factory B.E.2s and B.E.12s in an attempt to defend against German Zeppelin raids on London. Having moved to RFC Suttons Farm, 39 Squadron achieved its first success on the night of 2/3 September 1916, when Lieutenant William Leefe Robinson shot down the German Airship Schütte-Lanz SL11, being awarded the Victoria Cross for this action. On 23 September 1916, the German Navy launched another Zeppelin raid against London. Responding to this raid, 2nd Lieutenant Frederick Sowrey of No. 39 Squadron shot down Zeppelin L.32, while Alfred Brandon in another No. 39 Squadron B.E.2 engaged Zeppelin L.33, already damaged by anti-aircraft fire, with L.33 force landing at Little Wigborough, Essex, and being destroyed by its crew. On the night of 1/2 October 1916, 2nd Lieutenant W. L. Tempest of 39 Squadron, flying a B.E.2c, spotted Zeppelin L.31 illuminated by searchlights over southwest London and shot it down with the loss of the entire airship crew.

The squadron continued in the defence of London, supplementing its B.E.2s and B.E.12s with three Royal Aircraft Factory S.E.5s to help deal with daylight attacks by German Gotha bombers, with at least one Armstrong Whitworth F.K.8 also operated by the unit. The squadron re-equipped with Bristol F.2 Fighters in September 1917, but had no more success against German raiders until the night of 19/20 May 1918, when a No. 39 Squadron Bristol Fighter shot down a Gotha bomber. In October 1918, it was re-equipped with Royal Aircraft Factory F.E.2b aircraft and sent to France for night bombing, but was disbanded five days after the Armistice.

=== Between the wars ===
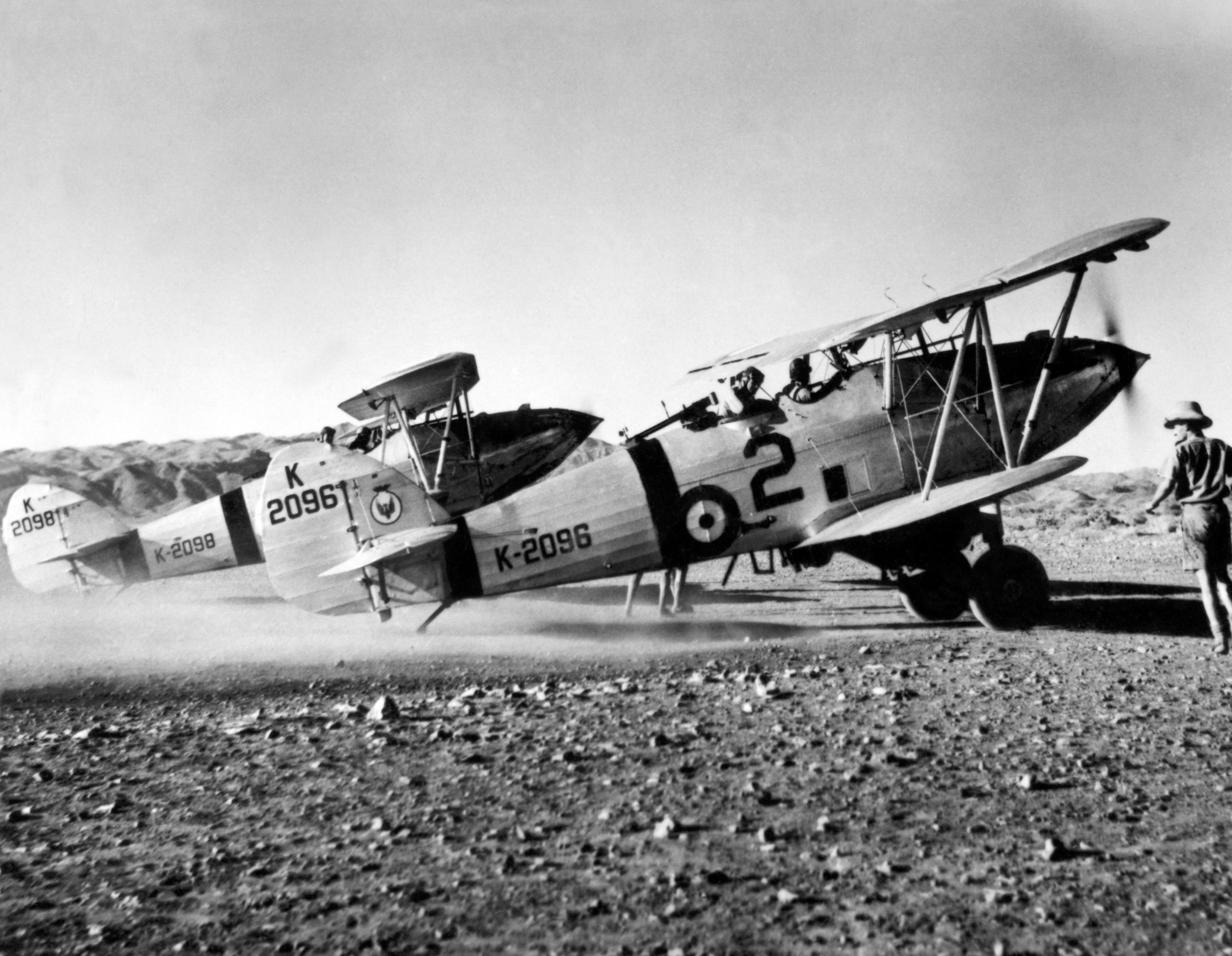
Hawker Harts K2096 and K2098 of No. 39 Squadron at Miramshah, Pakistan, 1938.

It was reformed on 1 July 1919, when 37 Squadron based at Biggin Hill was renumbered. The squadron was reduced to a cadre in December 1919, but did not disband, and in April 1921 the squadron was returned to operations, by May, the squadron was fully manned and received a number of Avro 504 to train aircrew in preparation for operating modern aircraft. These arrived in February 1923 when the squadron, now at RAF Spitalgate in Lincolnshire received 18 Airco DH.9As. (Note: While some sources state that No. 39 Squadron received its DH.9As in 1923, others suggest that they arrived earlier, either in 1921 or 1922.) With training for day bombing, the squadron also was chosen to perform a formation flying display at the RAF Air Pageant at Hendon in 1923, repeating its appearance in 1926 and 1927, when it flew joint formation flying and bombing displays with 207 Squadron.

In January 1928, the squadron moved to RAF Bircham Newton in Norfolk, where it began to prepare to a prospective move to British India. In December 1929 it left the United Kingdom, leaving behind its DH.9As to equip No. 101 Squadron. It arrived at Risalpur, North-West Frontier Province India (now part of Pakistan) at the end of January 1929, receiving its complement of twelve Westland Wapitis (which had been shipped separately) in March that year. It was used for Air Policing in the North West Frontier, carrying out bombing missions against rebel tribesmen, their villages and support for the army. In December 1931, it was re-equipped with Hawker Harts, operations continuing as before, also being used as part of the relief effort following the 1935 Quetta earthquake, flying supplies to Quetta and carrying out medical evacuations. Military operations included support of the Second Mohmand Campaign of 1935 against hostile tribesmen in Mohmand Territory and the Waziristan campaign against supporters of the Faqir of Ipi in 1938.

=== Second World War ===
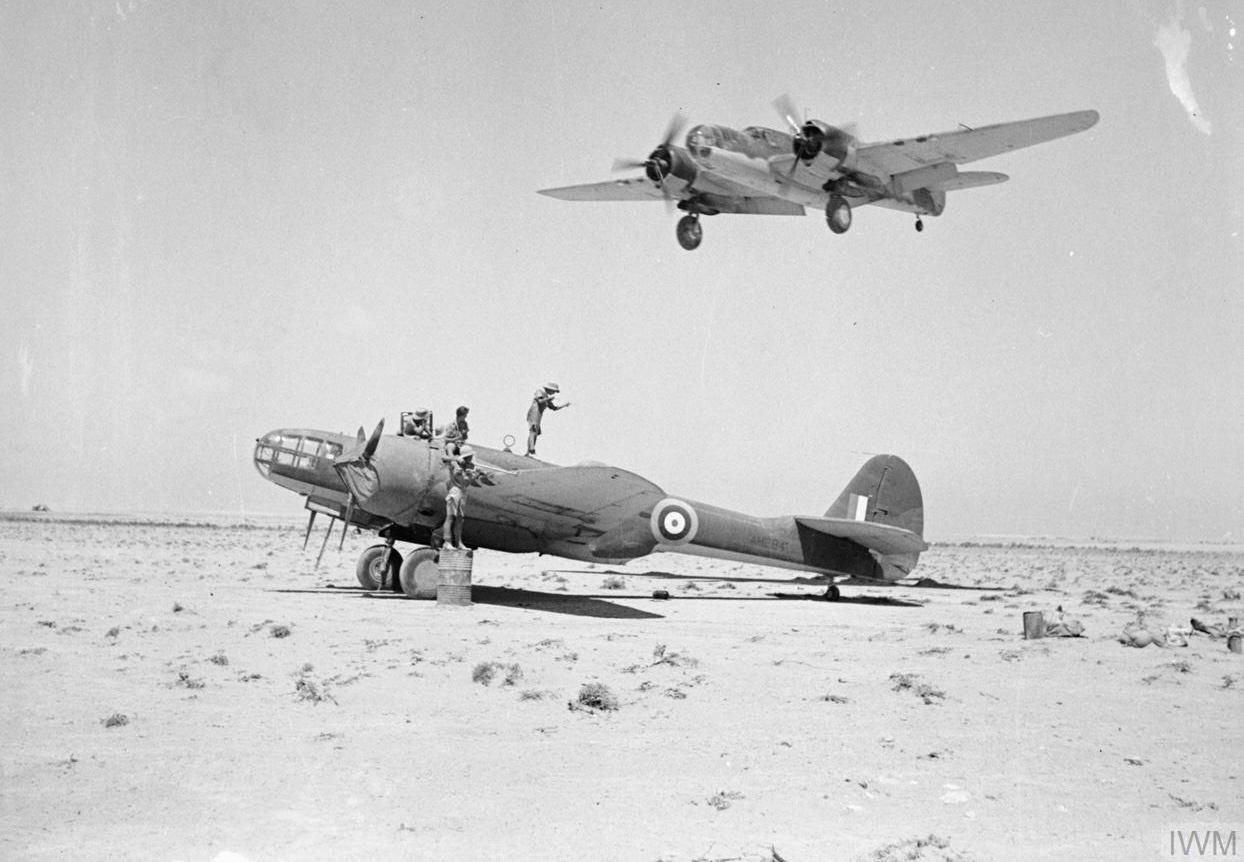
Martin Marylands of No. 39 Squadron operating from a landing ground in the Western Desert, 1941.

In 1939, the squadron re-equipped with more modern Bristol Blenheim I twin-engined monoplane bombers. As the threat of war increased, it was decided to strengthen British defences in the Far East by moving No. 39 Squadron to Singapore, with the squadron setting off with nine Blenheims on 6 August. The ferry trip was a disaster, with six aircraft wrecked, and three men killed, including Wing Commander Burton Ankers, commander of the 2nd Indian Wing Station at Risalpur, whose Blenheim caught fire and crashed after being struck by lightning. In April 1940, the squadron was ordered back to India, arriving at Lahore on 25 April, and then to strengthen defences in the Middle East, being ordered to reinforce Aden, setting out on 5 May, with the air component reaching Aden on 13 May and the groundcrew arriving by ship on 10 June 1940.

On that day, Italy declared war on Great Britain and France, and No. 39 Squadron was quickly committed to action against Italian East Africa, carrying out its first combat mission of the war on 12 June when a force of Blenheims attacked Dire Dawa airfield in Ethiopia, causing little damage. The squadron continued operations against Italian forces until 24 November, when it was ordered to transfer to Egypt to support the planned offensive in the Western Desert (Operation Compass), with the first aircraft leaving Aden for RAF Helwan on 29 November.

A detachment of three Blenheims operated with 45 Squadron over the Western Desert from 10 December, flying harassment raids against Italian-held airfields, while the remainder of the Squadron remained at Helwan while it recovered from the operations in East Africa, and started to replace its Blenheim Is with Blenheim IVs. In January, the squadron was ordered to recall the three aircraft detachment and hand over the squadron's Blenheims to 11 Squadron, which was to deploy to Greece. To replace its Blenheim IVs, 39 Squadron received Martin Maryland bombers, originally built for the French Air Force, becoming the first RAF squadron to operate the Maryland. Owing to the long-range of the Maryland, No. 39 Squadron used it mainly for reconnaissance. The squadron was in action during the Battle of Crete, claiming at least two Junkers Ju 52 transport aircraft shot down in its operations during the battle.

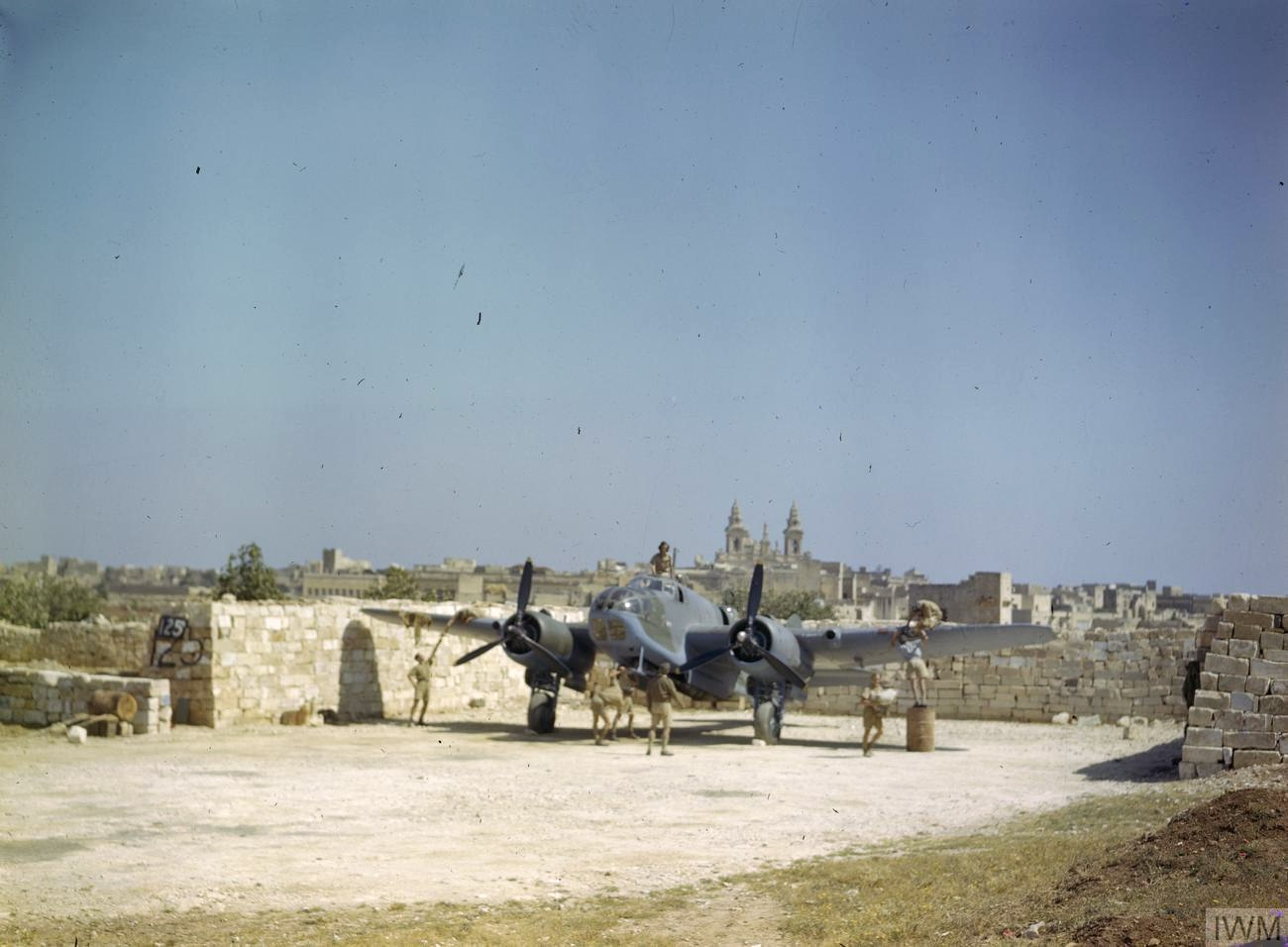
A 39 Squadron Beaufort II at RAF Luqa, Malta, in June 1943.

In August–September 1941, the squadron partly converted to the Bristol Beaufort torpedo bomber for anti-shipping operations, although it retained a flight of Marylands until January 1942. The Beauforts were armed with bombs but from January 1942 it added torpedo attack to its roles. On 23 January 1942, in the first torpedo bombing by the squadron, three Beauforts set out an airfield near Benghazi against an Italian convoy carrying supplies to Tripoli, Libya. They hit the troopship and ex-liner Victoria with two torpedoes. A third torpedo hit later that day by a Fairey Albacore of 826 Naval Air Squadron caused Victoria to sink. On 9 March 1942, eight 39 Squadron Beauforts carried out a strike against an Italian convoy running between North Africa and Italy. The squadron claimed that a destroyer had been sunk, with a cruiser and a merchant ship hit and damaged, but in fact no ships were hit. On 14 April, six 39 Squadron and two 22 Squadron Beauforts set out to attack an Italian convoy of four merchant ships escorted by five destroyers and a torpedo boat. The Beauforts came under very heavy air attack from German fighters as they attempted to attack the convoy, with five Beauforts shot down and two more badly damaged. While hits on two merchant ships and a destroyer were claimed, no damage was caused.

From June 1942, the squadron began to operate regular detachments from Malta, as most targets were at the edge of the Beaufort's range when operating from Egypt. The first detachment of five Beauforts was commanded by Squadron Leader Patrick Gibbs, and operated in conjunction with 217 Squadron, using tactics developed by Gibbs where the convoy would be attacked from both sides to spilt defensive fire, while fighters suppressed anti-aircraft fire. On 23 June, twelve Beauforts of 39 and 217 Squadron left RAF Luqa to attack a convoy of two merchant ships escorted by two destroyers and three torpedo boats. Both merchant ships, the Nino Bixio and Maria Roselli, were hit and the convoy had to return to Taranto, while two Beauforts were shot down and a third crashed on landing. On 3 July, Gibbs led four Beauforts, escorted by five Beaufighters on an attack against a convoy of three merchant ships escorted by three destroyers off the Greek coast. One merchant ship (Nino Bixio, which had been damaged on 23 June) was torpedoed and had to put into port for repairs, while two Beauforts were shot down. In August 1942, the remainder of the squadron's Beauforts were sent to Malta, joining with the original detachment from the squadron and Beauforts from 86 and 217 Squadrons to form a new 39 Squadron under the command of Gibbs. On 17 August, the squadron attacked a convoy west of Lampedusa, hitting the cargo ship Rosalino Pilo with two torpedoes (the ship was sunk by the submarine United that night). On 21 August, the squadron torpedoed the tanker Pozarica off Paxos, with the badly damaged tanker beaching herself, on 28 August the squadron sank the tanker Dielpi, and on 30 August sank the tanker San Andrea. Losses of shipping severely restricted supplies reaching the Afrika Korps, disrupting the German offensive.

In October 1942, the squadron moved back to Egypt, being based at RAF Shallufa in the Suez Canal Zone, with forward deployments to Gianaclis, near Alexandria, from where it carried out attacks against the Axis convoy routes between Crete and Tobruk. On 2 November, six of the squadron's Beauforts attacked a convoy just outside Tobruk, sinking the Italian auxiliary cruiser Zara and damaging the Brioni, which made harbour but was sunk by USAAF bombers before the ship's cargo of fuel and ammunition could be unloaded. Early in November 1942, as Allied forces advanced after the Second Battle of El Alamein, the squadron sent its Beauforts back to Malta to attack shipping to Tripoli and to intervene if the Italian Navy attempted to interfere with supply convoys to Malta or Operation Torch, the Allied landing in French North-West Africa. While no action was needed against the Italian fleet, the squadron carried out day and night anti-shipping patrols, and minelaying operations against Axis-held ports. In December 1942, most of the squadron's aircraft returned to Africa, while retaining a detachment at Malta.

On 14 January 1943, three Beauforts of 39 Squadron were carrying out an anti-submarine patrol south east of Malta when they spotted the Italian submarine Narvalo, returning to Italy after a supply run to Tripoli and carrying 11 Allied Prisoners of War, on the surface and attacked, badly damaging the submarine. Narvalo's commanding officer decided to scuttle the submarine, but while the crew were abandoning ship, the British destroyers Pakenham and Hursley and opened fire. Thirty-seven men from Narvalo were killed, including 8 prisoners, while 32 were rescued. On 20 January 1943, two 39 Squadron Beauforts attacked the Italian tanker Saturno, which had been bombed earlier that day by American bombers and was under tow by the torpedo boat Ardito, sinking Saturno. On 21 January, the squadron's remaining Africa-based Beauforts and aircrew were sent to Malta to join up with the existing detachment. The squadron's ground staff remained at Shallufa and were loaned out to other units while remaining part of 39 Squadron. On the night of 23/24 January 1943, 39 Squadron Beauforts attacked a convoy of two freighters on passage from Naples to Bizerta. The freighter Verona was torpedoed and sank the next day, while the other freighter in the convoy, Pistoia, was torpedoed and sunk later the same night by Wellingtons of 221 Squadron.

In 1943 the unit re-equipped with Bristol Beaufighter for ground attack and moved back to Egypt then on to Italy. During the Greek Civil War, it sent rocket-armed aircraft to participate in RAF operations. In December 1944, it re-equipped with Martin B-26 Marauders, flying medium bombing missions in support of Tito's Partisans. It re-equipped with de Havilland Mosquitos in 1946, disbanding later in the year.

=== Cold War ===
It reformed as a fighter squadron equipped with Tempests at Nairobi on 1 April 1948, disbanding on 28 February 1949 and reforming the next day at RAF Fayid in Egypt, flying Mosquito NF Mk 36 night fighters. The squadron moved to nearby RAF Kabrit on 21 February 1951. Tension between the British forces in the Suez Canal Zone and the Egyptians, who wanted Britain out of Egypt, and following anti-British riots in Cairo in January 1952, the squadron was readied to support a British attack on Cairo if the situation further deteriorated, until the Egyptian army intervened and stopped the rioting, easing tensions a little. It re-equipped with Meteor NF.13 night fighters in March 1953, but following the Egyptian revolution of 1952, the situation for the British gradually became untenable and in October 1954, the Anglo-Egyptian Agreement was signed, in which Britain agreed that its forces would leave Egypt by June 1956. As part of this agreement, 39 Squadron moved to RAF Luqa in Malta on 10 January 1955.

The squadron moved to RAF Akrotiri on Cyprus in August 1956 as Britain and France prepared to invade the Egypt over the Suez Crisis the nationalisation of the Suez Canal. On 31 October, the British and French launched Operation Musketeer, air attacks against Egyptian targets, followed by landings on 6 November; 39 Squadron's role was to protect the vital airfields on Cyprus from any potential Egyptian retaliation. Pressure from the UN forced a ceasefire in Egypt and a withdrawal of the Anglo-French forces by the end of December, but the squadron remained in Cyprus after the British forces dispersed, flying patrols to deter aircraft that were suspected of dropping supplies to EOKA forces fighting against the British rule of Cyprus. The main body of the squadron returned to Malta in March 1957, but a detachment was maintained on Cyprus. Tensions in Lebanon (which culminated in the Lebanon Crisis of July–October 1958) caused the squadron to move to Cyprus in May 1958, but it soon returned to Malta and disbanded on 30 June 1958.

The squadron reformed the next day at RAF Luqa by renumbering 69 Squadron, flying reconnaissance Canberra PR.3s for high-altitude reconnaissance and assigned to the NATO Sixth Allied Tactical Air Force. It moved to RAF Wyton in September 1970, disbanding on 1 June 1982.

=== No. 1 Photographic Reconnaissance Unit ===
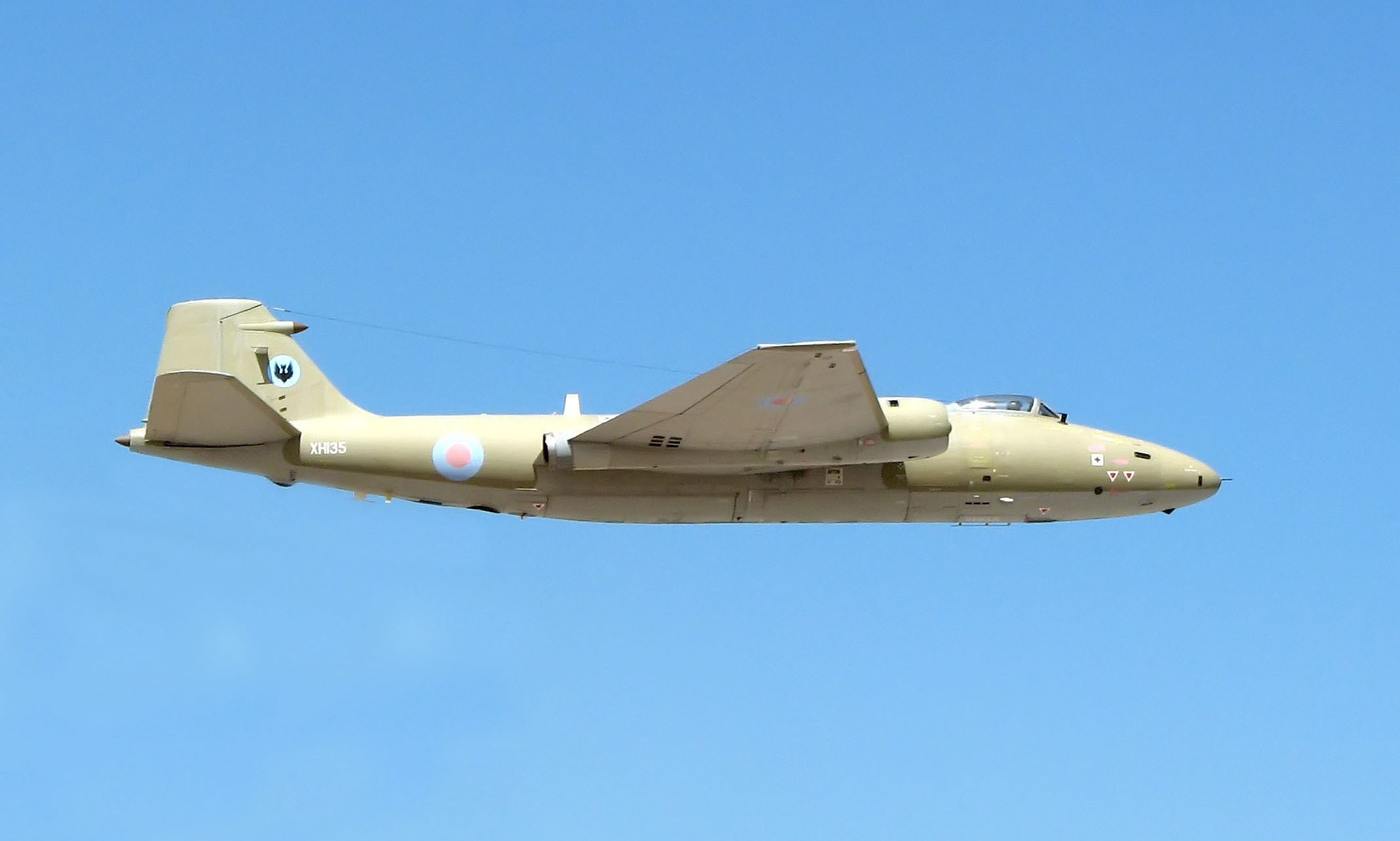
English Electric Canberra PR.9 XH135 of No. 39 (1 PRU) Squadron departing RIAT, 2006.

The squadron was reformed on 1 July 1992 when No. 1 Photographic Reconnaissance Unit (1 PRU) at RAF Wyton, equipped with Canberra PR.9 and T.4 aircraft was re-numbered No. 39 (1 PRU) Squadron. The unit moved to RAF Marham in December 1993, where it also received Canberra PR.7s. In December 1996, the squadron deployed to Uganda to search for Rwandan refugees in eastern Zaire after the Rwandan genocide. Between 1996 and 2001, 39 (1 PRU) Squadron deployed six times to Kenya and Zimbabwe to carry out photo-mapping. Between October 2001 and January 2002, the squadron deployed two Canberra PR.9s to Seeb International Airport, Oman, from where it undertook sorties over Afghanistan as part of Operation Veritas and Operation Oracle. In 2003, the unit deployed to Azraq Air Base, Jordan, in support of Operation Telic. On 8 September 2003, Canberra PR.9 XH168 was written off after bursting its main landing gear tyres upon touching down at RAF Marham, with the crew suffering no injuries. In November 2003, two Canberra PR.9s departed to RAF Mount Pleasant, Falkland Islands, to carry out survey work.

On 2 September 2004, Canberra T.4 WJ866 crashed at RAF Marham while carrying out a touch and go at night time, killing both pilots and injuring the navigator, this was the last operational Canberra loss for the RAF. No. 39 (1 PRU) Squadron carried out the last RAF flight of a Canberra T.4 (WJ874) on 1 September 2005, marking an end to 45 years of service, flying over locations associated with the type such as RAF Wyton, former RAF Bassingbourn and the former English Electric factory at Samlesbury Aerodrome.

In January 2006, 39 (1 PRU) Squadron deployed for the last time to Afghanistan in support of Operation Herrick, with the two Canberra PR.9s arriving back to RAF Marham on 23 June 2006 – marking an end to operational service for the Canberra. The squadron disbanded on 28 July 2006 at RAF Marham, with the occasion marked by a flypast and parade. The last three Canberras (XH131, XH134 and XH135) undertook their last flight from Marham to Kemble Airfield, Gloucestershire, on 31 July 2006.

=== RPAS ===
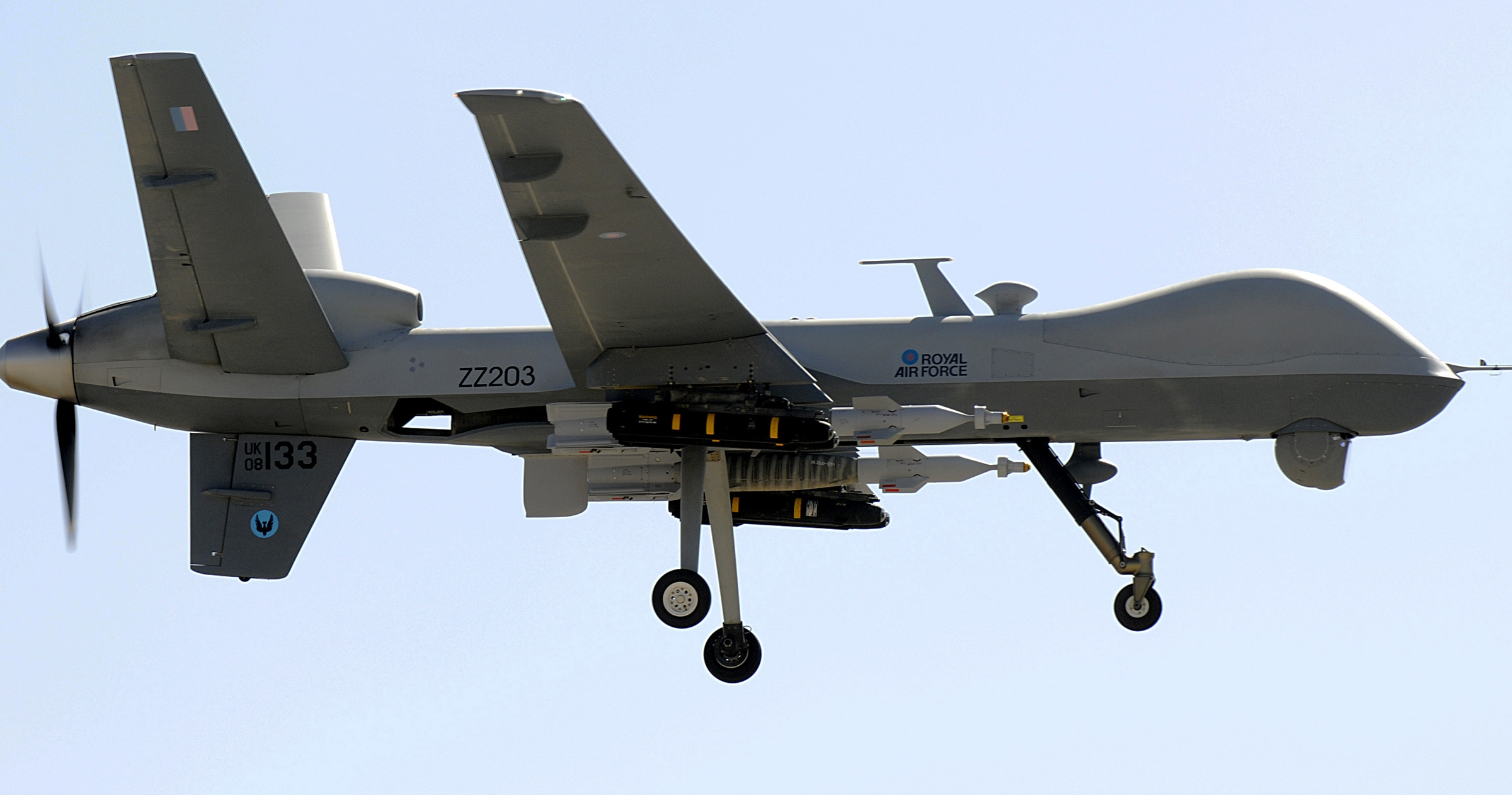
General Atomics MQ-9A Reaper ZZ203 of No. 39 Squadron landing at Kandahar Airfield, Afghanistan, 2010.

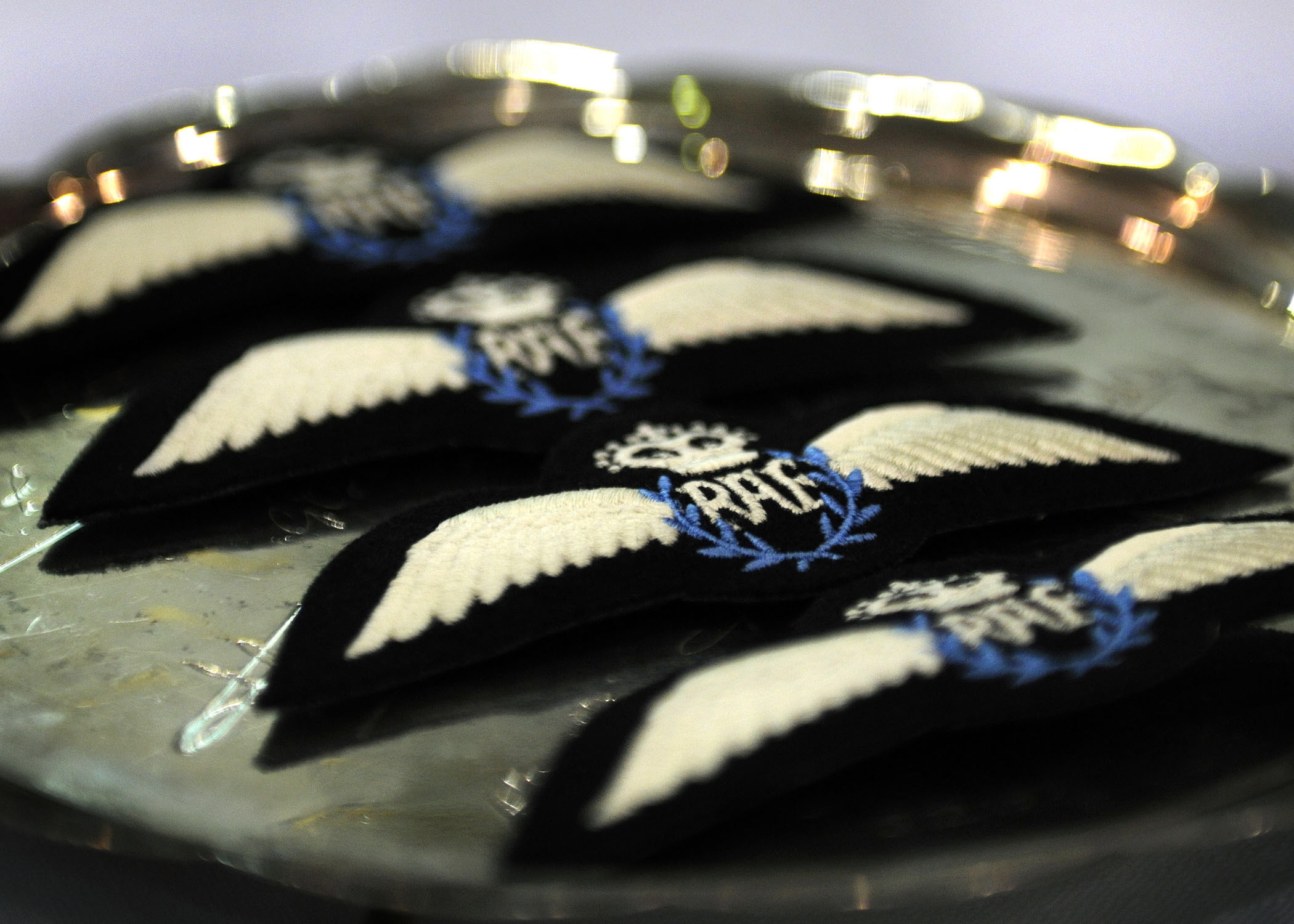
RAF Remotely Piloted Air System (RPAS) 'Wings', which differ only slightly from the current RAF pilot badge by having blue laurel leaves to identify the specialisation. (Phased out in favour of traditional Pilot Brevet as of 1 Apr 2019)

In January 2004, a new unit, No. 1115 Flight, was formed at Creech Air Force Base in Nevada to operate the RAF's first Remotely-piloted Air System (RPAS). Operating the General Atomics MQ-1 Predator, the unit was embedded with the United States Air Force as part of the Joint Predator Task Force. The RAF crews, integrated with 42nd Attack Squadron, began training on the General Atomics MQ-9A Reaper in late 2006. No. 39 Squadron was reformed on 1 January 2007 at Creech AFB, parented by RAF Waddington in Lincolnshire. The former No. 1115 Flight became 'A' Flight still operating the Predator, while 'B' Flight prepared to receive the Reaper. The squadron's first Reaper (ZZ200) was delivered to Afghanistan in early October 2007, officially entering into RAF service on 31 October. On 9 November 2007, the Ministry of Defence announced that the squadron's MQ-9 Reapers had begun operations in Afghanistan against the Taliban. On 23 January 2008, No. 39 Squadron was awarded a new squadron Standard.

On 9 April 2008, MQ-9A Reaper ZZ200 was destroyed after it made a forced landing in southern Afghanistan in order stop it from falling into insurgents hands. As of March 2009, the squadron operated 12 three-man teams to pilot its Reaper aircraft. Supporting intelligence specialists, Information Communications Technicians, signallers, and meteorologists bring the total number of squadron personnel to around 90. The squadron operated two aircraft but planned to have a total of six by the end of 2009. As of April 2011, five Reaper aircraft were in operation, with a further five on order and as of September 2016, the squadron had ten operational Reaper aircraft, with missions being undertaken in Syria as part of Operation Shader.

No. 39 Squadron was awarded the battle honour 'Afghanistan 2001–2014' (without the right to emblazon) by Her Majesty Queen Elizabeth II on 24 March 2020 due to their participation in Operation Herrick.

The squadron disbanded in July 2022, with a Reaper Ground Control System returning from Creech AFB to RAF Waddington for use by No. 13 Squadron. No. 39 Squadron managed 90,000 hours of RPAS operations while based at Creech AFB. The last Officer Commanding No. 39 Squadron Group Captain Wigglesworth went on to become the Station Commander for RAF Marham, the former home of No. 39 Squadron, in September 2022. The squadron Standard was laid up in the Rotunda at College Hall Officers' Mess at Royal Air Force College Cranwell in February 2023.

== Aircraft operated ==
From Delve (1985) pp. 169–170 except where stated

- Royal Aircraft Factory BE.2c, d and e (April 1916 – 1917)
- Royal Aircraft Factory BE.12 (April 1916 – 1917)
- Royal Aircraft Factory SE.5a (1917)
- Bristol F.2 Fighter (1917 – November 1918)
- Avro 504 (1921)
- Airco DH.9A (February 1923 – December 1928)
- Westland Wapiti (1928 – November 1931)
- Hawker Hart (November 1931 – August 1939)
- Bristol Blenheim I and IV (August 1939 – January 1941)
- Martin Maryland (January 1941 – January 1942)
- Bristol Beaufort (August 1941 – June 1943)
- Bristol Beaufighter (June 1943 – December 1944)
- Martin Marauder (December 1944 –September 1946)
- de Havilland Mosquito FB.VI , T3 (January 1946 – September 1946)
- Hawker Tempest F.VI (June 1948 – March 1949)
- de Havilland Mosquito NF.36 and T.3 (June 1949 – March 1953)
- Gloster Meteor NF.13 (March 1953 – June 1958)
- English Electric Canberra PR.3, PR.7, PR.9 and T.4 (June 1958 – June 1982)
- English Electric Canberra PR.7 and PR.9 (July 1992 – July 2006)
- General Atomics MQ-1 Predator (January 2007 – unknown)
- General Atomics MQ-9 Reaper (October 2007 – July 2022)

== Heritage ==
The squadron's badge features a green bomb with wings and was awarded in October 1936.

The squadron's motto is Die noctuque (Latin for 'By day and night').

== Battle honours ==
No. 39 Squadron has received the following battle honours. Those marked with an asterisk (*) may be emblazoned on the squadron standard.

- Home Defence (1916-1918)*
- North West Frontier (1930–1931)
- Mohmand (1933)
- North West Frontier (1935–1939)
- East Africa (1940)*
- Egypt & Libya (1940–1943)*
- Greece (1941)*
- Mediterranean (1941–1943)*
- Malta (1942)*
- North Africa (1942–1943)*
- South East Europe (1944–1945)*
- Afghanistan (2001–2014)*
- Iraq (2003)
- Iraq (2003–2011)

== See also ==
- List of Royal Air Force aircraft squadrons
