= LZ 61 (L 21) =

World War I German Navy airship

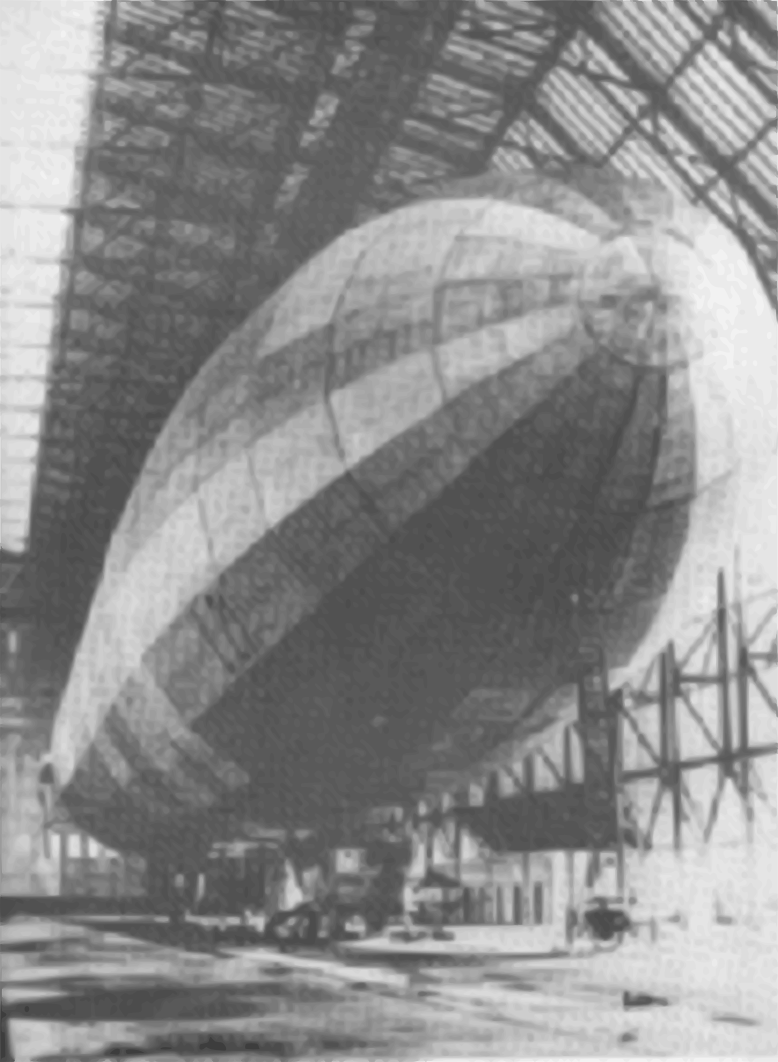
- LZ 61 in hangar at Nordholz Airbase in 1916

History

German Empire
- Name: LZ 61
- Operator: Imperial German Navy
- Builder: Luftschiffbau Zeppelin
- Maiden voyage: 10 January 1916
- Identification: L 21
- Fate: Shot down, 28 November 1916

General characteristics
- Type: Airship
- Length: 163.5 m
- Beam: 18.7 m ø
- Installed power: Four 240 hp Maybach HSLu engines
- Speed: 97 km/h
- Capacity: 31,900 m³ Gas Volume

The LZ 61 was a World War I German Navy airship, allocated the tactical numbering 'L 21'. It carried out a total of ten raids on England, and 17 reconnaissance missions.

== Raids on England ==
The LZ 61 took part in a total of ten raids on England during 1916. These included:

- 31 January

It was ordered to attack Liverpool, but problems with night navigation meant that instead it bombed Tipton, Bradley, Wednesbury, and Walsall: killing over 30 people - including Julia Slater, Walsall's Mayoress.

- 1 April

It attacked Cleethorpes, dropping several bombs on the town just after midnight. One of which landed on the Alexandra Road Baptist Chapel, killing 31 soldiers of the 3rd Battalion the Manchester Regiment, who were billeted there. One of the few British Army units to be directly engaged by enemy action on British soil during World War I.

- 2 September

It took part in the largest airship attack of the war with 13 other naval airships and also four army airships - 16 in total. During this raid, the crew of the LZ 61 witnessed the downing of the SL 11, the first airship to be shot down over the British mainland.

- 25–26 September

It was unable to find its designated targets of Derby and Nottingham, and instead attacked Bolton, Lumb, Rawtenstall, Ewood Bridge, Stonefold, Haslingden, Helmshore, Rossendale, Ramsbottom and Holcombe.

== Destruction of the LZ 61 ==
On 27 November 1916, ten Zeppelins set out in two groups, heading for the Midlands and the North of England. One, the L.21, crossed the English coast at Atwick at 21:20, and then turned north to evade patrolling aircraft before heading to Leeds, where it was driven off by heavy anti-aircraft fire. An effective blackout shielded Barnsley from attack, so the airship headed southwest to the Potteries where it dropped a number of bombs on industrial targets in Stoke, causing some damage, but no casualties. At 01:30, it headed for home, setting a course towards Great Yarmouth. It was spotted by two RNAS aircraft north of Peterborough, but managed to evade them. Over East Dereham, it was spotted by Flight Lieutenant W. R. Gaynor, who was forced to abort his attack after suffering engine failure. However, reports of the L.21's movements had reached Great Yarmouth, so at dawn Egbert Cadbury and Flight Sub Lieutenant Gerard W. R. Fane took off in their B.E.2c fighters to intercept. They were joined by Flight Sub Lieutenant Edward L. Pulling from RNAS Bacton. Cadbury later reported:

I saw the Zeppelin approaching the coast and immediately chased after it. It was flying about 5,000 feet when I first saw it and it immediately climbed to 8,000 feet. I went after it. I approached from the stern about 3,000 feet below and fired four drums of explosive ammunition in to its stern, which immediately started to light. At the same time one of the other pilots was flying over the Zeppelin and to his horror he saw a man in the machine-gun pit run to the other side and leap overboard. Having seen the Zeppelin circle down to the sea in a blazing mass – a most horrible sight – I went back to Yarmouth. I could not say I felt very elated or pleased at this; somehow I was overawed at the spectacle of this Zeppelin and all the people aboard going down into the sea.

== Commanders ==
LZ 61 Commanding Officers
	From	To
Kapitänleutnant Max Dietrich	19 January 1916	4 July 1916
Hauptmann August Stelling	24 June 1916	-
Oberleutnant Zee Kurt Frankenberg	15 August 1916	28 November 1916

== Operational bases ==
LZ 61 Bases
	From
Nordholz	19 January 1916
Seddin	21 February 1916
Tønder	5 April 1916
Nordholz	16 April 1916

== Confusion with SL 11 ==
For unknown reasons, when the SL 11 became the first German airship to be shot down over England, it was described officially and in the press as the Zeppelin L 21 (the LZ 61's tactical number). This misidentification persisted for decades, even though it is clear that the authorities were always aware of its correct identity.

One suggestion for this confusion was a calculation by the authorities that the downing of a hated and feared Zeppelin 'baby killer', would be received better with the public than the destruction of an almost unknown Schütte-Lanz type.

Accordingly, the 1918 film The Last Raid of Zeppelin L-21 told the story of the SL 11's destruction and not that of the LZ 61.
