= Schütte-Lanz SL 11 =

German airship in the First World War

- Silhouette of SL 11

History

German Empire
- Name: SL 11
- Operator: German Army
- Builder: Luftschiffbau Schütte-Lanz
- Launched: 1 August 1916
- Home port: Spich
- Fate: Shot down, September 3, 1916

General characteristics
- Type: Airship
- Tonnage: 21 tonnes
- Displacement: 38 780 m³ of hydrogen
- Length: 174 metres
- Beam: 20.1 metres
- Installed power: 4 Maybach 960 hp/716 kW total
- Speed: 91.8 km/h
- Complement: 16

The Schütte-Lanz SL 11 was a German military dirigible built in 1916 by Luftschiffbau Schütte-Lanz. It was the first German airship to be shot down while bombing England.

== Operational history ==
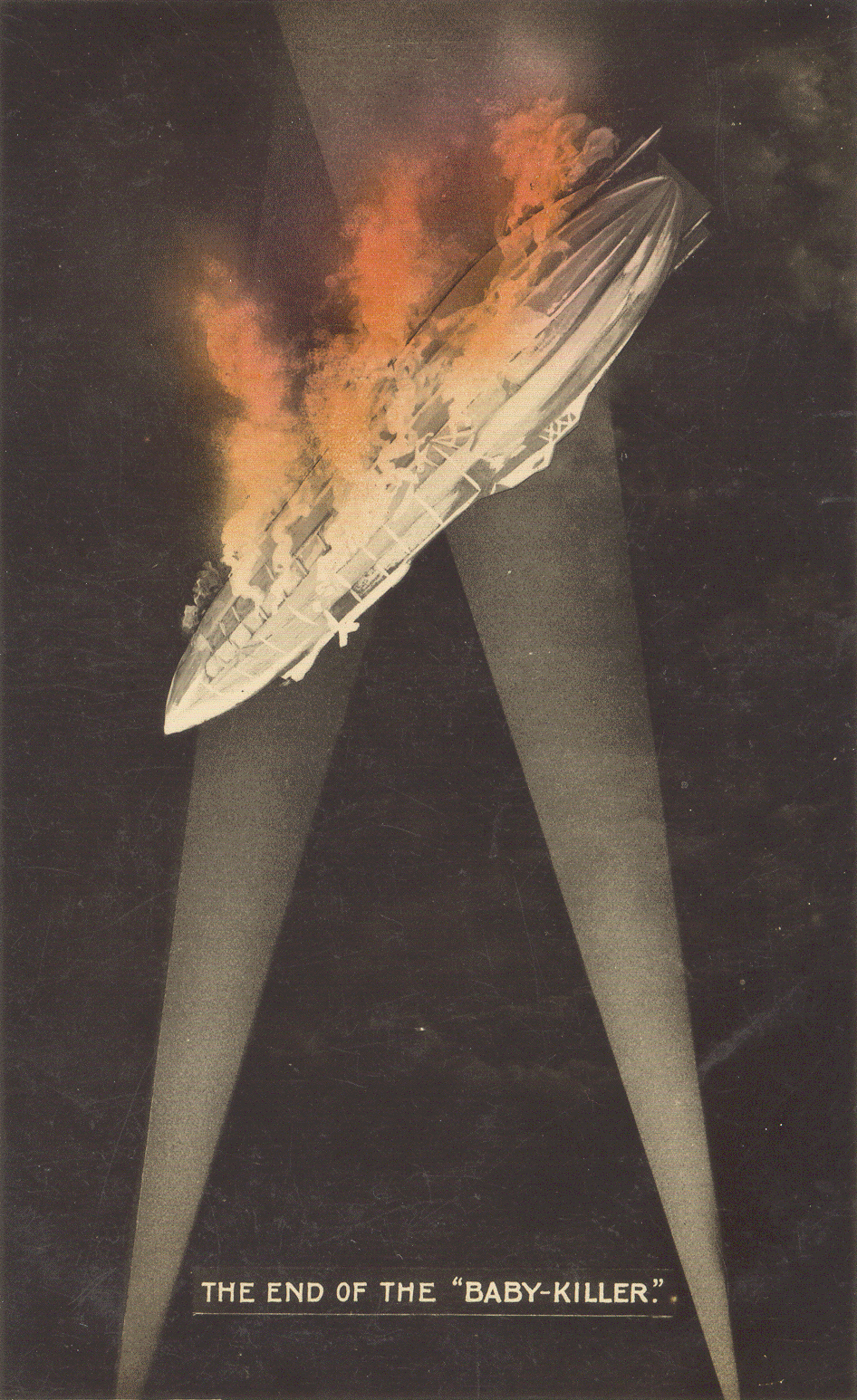
British propaganda postcard entitled "The End of the 'Baby-Killer'"

The SL 11 was based at Spich and commanded by Hauptmann Wilhelm Schramm. In the early hours of 3 September 1916, after jettisoning bombs over Essendon, Hertfordshire, destroying several houses, damaging a church, and killing two sisters aged 26 and 12,

It was then shot down over nearby Cuffley by Lt. William Leefe Robinson flying a BE 2C using incendiary ammunition. It crashed at Cuffley, killing the entire crew, who were buried at Potters Bar Cemetery.

== Legacy ==
Leefe Robinson was awarded the Victoria Cross on the September 5th, just two days after destroying the airship.

Many fragments of the airship survive as the British Red Cross Society was given large quantities of wire from the wreck to turn into souvenirs. These were sold to raise funds for the society.

The airship crew were re-interred at Cannock Chase German Military Cemetery in 1962.

== Specifications ==
- First Flight: 1 August 1916
- Length: 174 m (571 ft)
- Diameter: 20.1 m (66 ft)
- Gas Capacity: 38,780 m^{3} (1,370,000 cu ft)
- Performance: 91.8 km/h (57.0 mph; 49.6 kn)
- Payload: 21 t (21,000 kg; 46,000 lb)
- Engines: 4x Maybach HS-Lu 6-cyl in-line engines:960 hp (970 PS; 720 kW) total

== See also ==
- List of Schütte-Lanz airships
