= Leefe Robinson =

British WW1 fighter pilot (1895–1918)

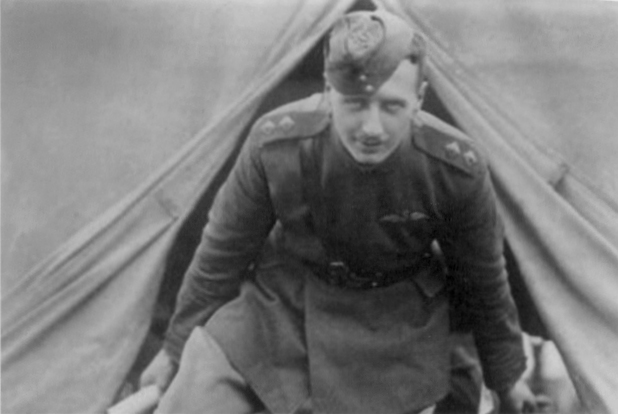
- Born: William Leefe Robinson; 14 July 1895; Pollibetta, Coorg, India
- Died: 31 December 1918 (aged 23); Stanmore, Middlesex, England
- Burial place: All Saints' Churchyard Extension, Harrow Weald, Middlesex
- Military career
- Allegiance: United Kingdom
- Service years: 1914–1918
- Rank: Captain
- Units: 39 Squadron; 48 Squadron
- Commands: Flight Commander
- Conflicts: World War I
- Awards: Victoria Cross

William Leefe Robinson VC (14 July 1895 – 31 December 1918) was the first British pilot to shoot down a German airship over Britain during the First World War. For this, he was awarded the Victoria Cross (VC), the highest award for gallantry in the face of the enemy that can be awarded to British and Commonwealth forces. He was the first person to be awarded the VC for action in the UK.

His action marked a turning point in the war against the airship menace, and caused the German airship bombing campaign to falter. In the three months afterwards, five more airships were shot down using the combat techniques he had proven.

== Early life ==
Robinson was born in Coorg, India, on 14 July 1895, the youngest son of Horace Robinson and Elizabeth Leefe. Raised on his parents' coffee estate, Kaima Betta Estate, at Pollibetta in Coorg, he attended Bishop Cotton Boys' School, Bangalore, and the Dragon School, Oxford, before following his elder brother Harold to St Bees School, Cumberland, in September, 1909. While there, he succeeded his brother as Head of Eaglesfield House in 1913, played in the Rugby 1st XV and became a sergeant in the school Officer Training Corps.

== First World War ==
In August, 1914, he entered the Royal Military College, Sandhurst, and was gazetted into the Worcestershire Regiment in December. In March, 1915, he went to France as an observer with the Royal Flying Corps, to which he had transferred. After being wounded over Lille, he underwent pilot training in Britain, before being attached to No. 39 (Home Defence) Squadron, a night-flying squadron at Sutton's Farm airfield near Hornchurch in Essex.

=== The V.C. action ===
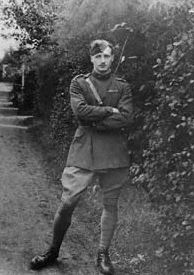
Leefe Robinson photographed at Suttons Farm in 1916

On the night of 2/3 September 1916 over Cuffley, in what was then Essex, now Hertfordshire Lieutenant Robinson, flying a converted B.E.2c night fighter No. 2693, sighted a German airship – one of 16 which had left bases in Germany for the largest airship raid of the war over England. The airship he encountered was the wooden-framed Schütte-Lanz SL 11, although at the time and for many years after, it was misidentified as the Zeppelin L 21. Robinson was in the air for several hours. After initially spotting the airship, he lost it in clouds. Later, he again made contact and attacked at an altitude of 11,500 ft (3,500 m), approaching from below and closing to within 500 ft (150 m) raking the airship from below with machine-gun fire of incendiary and explosive bullets (alternate "New Brock" and "Pomeroy" rounds). However, these two runs were unsuccessful. He then tried his third and last ammunition drum by concentrating on a single location, and the airship burst into flames and crashed in a field behind the Plough Inn at Cuffley . Commander Hauptmann Wilhelm Schramm and his 15-man crew were killed.

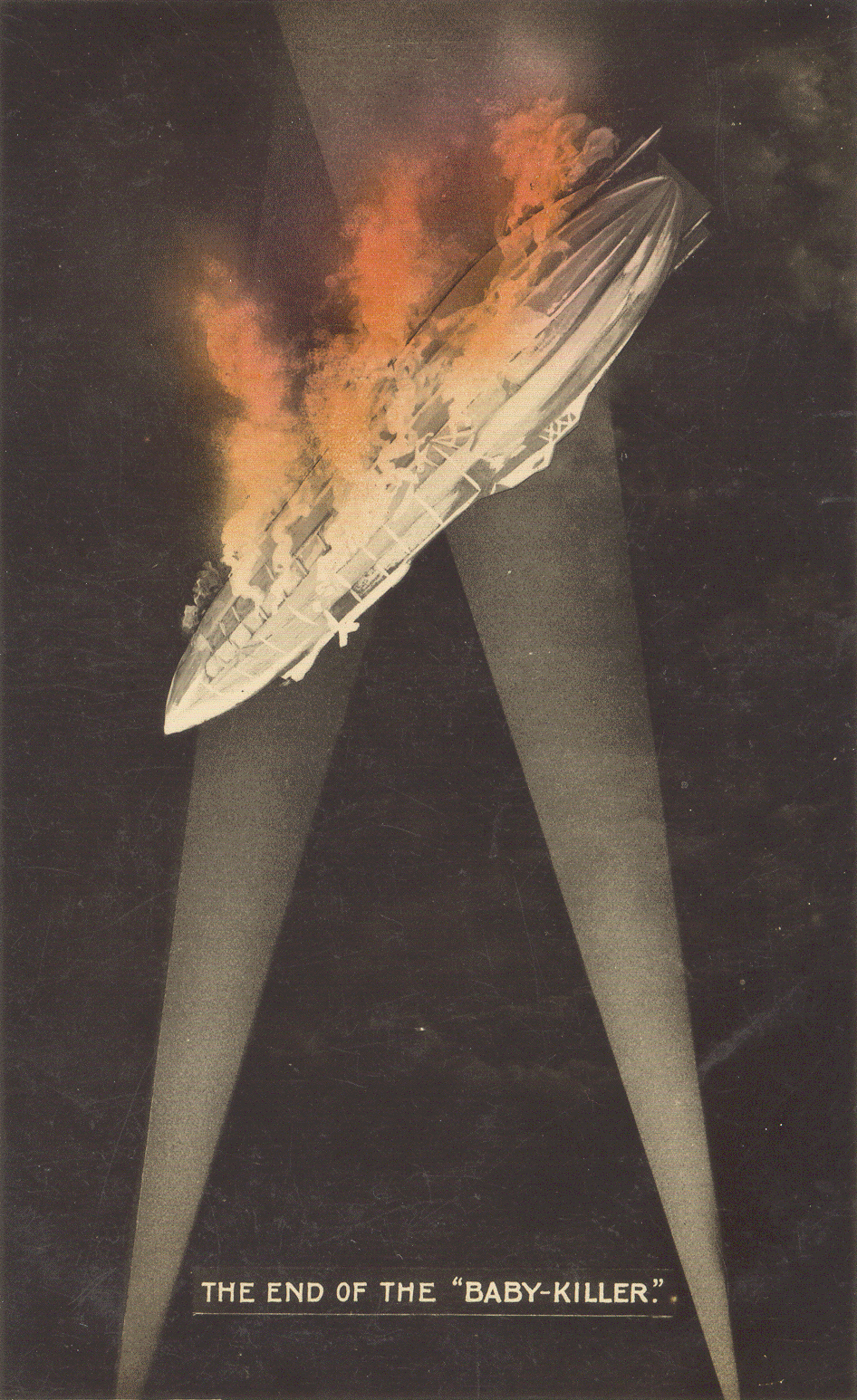
British propaganda postcard, "The End of the 'Baby-Killer'", depicting the demise of Schütte-Lanz SL 11 over Cuffley, shot down by Lieutenant Leefe Robinson on 3 September 1916

In his combat report to his commanding officer, Leefe Robinson wrote:

September 1916

From: Lieutenant Leefe Robinson, Sutton's Farm.
To: The Officer Commanding No. 39 H. D. Squadron.

Sir:

I have the honour to make the following report on night patrol made by me on the night of the 2-3 instant. I went up at about 11.08 p.m. on the night of the second with instructions to patrol between Sutton's Farm and Joyce Green.

I climbed to 10,000 feet in fifty-three minutes. I counted what I thought were ten sets of flares - there were a few clouds below me, but on the whole it was a beautifully clear night. I saw nothing until 1.10 a.m., when two searchlights picked up a Zeppelin S.E. of Woolwich. The clouds had collected in this quarter and the searchlights had some difficulty in keeping on the airship.

By this time I had managed to climb to 12,000 feet and I made in the direction of the Zeppelin - which was being fired on by a few anti-aircraft guns - hoping to cut it off on its way eastward. I very slowly gained on it for about ten minutes.

I judged it to be about 800 feet below me and I sacrificed some speed in order to keep the height. It went behind some clouds, avoiding the searchlight, and I lost sight of it. After fifteen minutes of fruitless search I returned to my patrol.

I managed to pick up and distinguish my flares again. At about 1.50 a.m. I noticed a red glow in the N.E. of London. Taking it to be an outbreak of fire, I went in that direction. At 2.05 a Zeppelin was picked up by the searchlights over N.N.E. London (as far as I could judge).

Remembering my last failure, I sacrificed height (I was at about 12,900 feet) for speed and nosed down in the direction of the Zeppelin. I saw shells bursting and night tracers flying around it.

When I drew closer I noticed that the anti-aircraft aim was too high or too low; also a good many shells burst about 800 feet behind-a few tracers went right over. I could hear the bursts when about 3,000 feet from the Zeppelin.

I flew about 800 feet below it from bow to stem and distributed one drum among it (alternate New Brock and Pomeroy). It seemed to have no effect;

I therefore moved to one side and gave them another drum along the side - also without effect. I then got behind it and by this time I was very close - 500 feet or less below, and concentrated one drum on one part (underneath rear). I was then at a height of 11,500 feet when attacking the Zeppelin.

I had hardly finished the drum before I saw the part fired at, glow. In a few seconds the whole rear part was blazing. When the third drum was fired, there were no searchlights on the Zeppelin, and no anti-aircraft was firing.

I quickly got out of the way of the falling, blazing Zeppelin and, being very excited, fired off a few red Very lights and dropped a parachute flare.

Having little oil or petrol left, I returned to Sutton's Farm, landing at 2.45 a.m. On landing, I found the Zeppelin gunners had shot away the machine-gun wire guard, the rear part of my centre section, and had pierced the main spar several times.

I have the honour to be, sir,

Your obedient servant,
(Signed)
W. Leefe Robinson, Lieutenant

No. 39 Squadron, R.F.C.

The propaganda value of this success was enormous to the British Government, as it indicated that the German airship threat could be countered.

== Celebrity ==
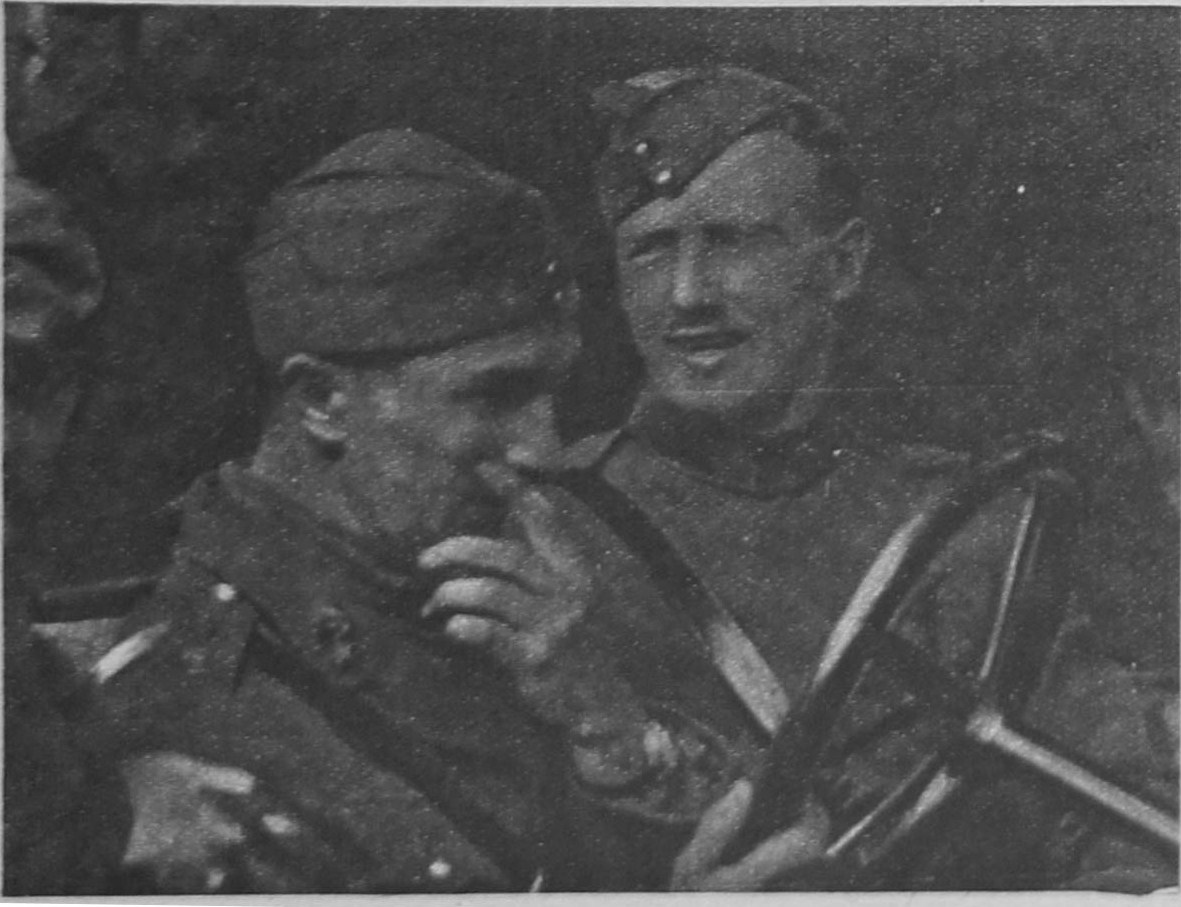
Robinson (right) with Frederick Sowrey in Robinson's "Prince Henry": a photograph published in the French news magazine, Le Miroir in September 1916

Robinson landed his damaged biplane at 2.45 a.m. to tremendous acclaim from the squadron, and immediately wrote his combat report. He woke up to find that he had become a national celebrity overnight. He was splashed across all the major newspapers, and young actresses from the West End jostled to get an introduction to him. Tens of thousands of people made their way to see the remains of the airship at Cuffley, parts of which were sold by the Red Cross for charity fundraising mounted on pieces of card.

Just two days later, Robinson was awarded the Victoria Cross – thought to be the fastest on record – and received the medal on 9 September at Windsor Castle, with huge crowds of admirers and onlookers in attendance. Robinson was also awarded £3,500 in prize money and a silver cup donated by the people of Hornchurch. Unfortunately, on 16 September, he crashed his plane (2693) when attempting to take off for a night patrol. It was a total wreck; he escaped just before it was consumed by fire. This incident led to his being grounded, as he was too valuable a national figure, with a long string of official engagements, to run such risks. Only the propeller survived and is on public display in the Armoury of Culzean Castle in Ayrshire. It was given to the Marquess of Ailsa in thanks for letting his land at Turnberry be used for an RFC flying school.

However, the combat technique of using concentrated upward fire and mixed incendiary bullets had been proven by Leefe Robinson, and more successes quickly followed. On 23 September 1916, Frederick Sowrey, also of 39 Squadron, shot down the Zeppelin L.32. On the night of 1/2 October 1916, 2nd Lieutenant W. L. Tempest of 39 Squadron, flying a B.E.2c, spotted the Zeppelin L.31, illuminated by searchlights over southwest London, and shot it down with the loss of the entire airship crew. In all, five more German airships were destroyed by Home Defence B.E.2c interceptors between October and December 1916.

== Western Front ==
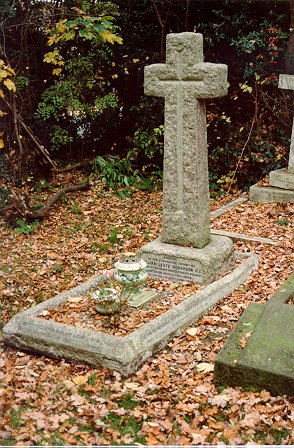
William Leefe Robinson's grave at All Saints' Church Cemetery, Harrow Weald.

After continual pestering of the authorities to allow him to return to active service, in April 1917 Robinson was posted to France as a flight commander with No. 48 Squadron, flying the then new Bristol F.2 Fighter.

On the first patrol over the lines, on 5 April Robinson's formation of six aircraft encountered the Albatros D.III fighters of Jasta 11, led by Manfred von Richthofen. Four were shot down. Robinson, flying Bristol F2A A3337, was shot down by Vizefeldwebel Sebastian Festner, and was wounded and captured.

He was posted as dead until two months later a letter arrived from him in a POW camp. During his imprisonment, he made several attempts to escape and was moved around to several camps, including Fort Zorndorf (now Fort Sarbinowo, Kostrzyn nad Odrą, Poland) and Holzminden. He was kept in solitary confinement at the latter camp for his escape attempts. It is thought his health was badly affected during his time as a prisoner.

== Death ==
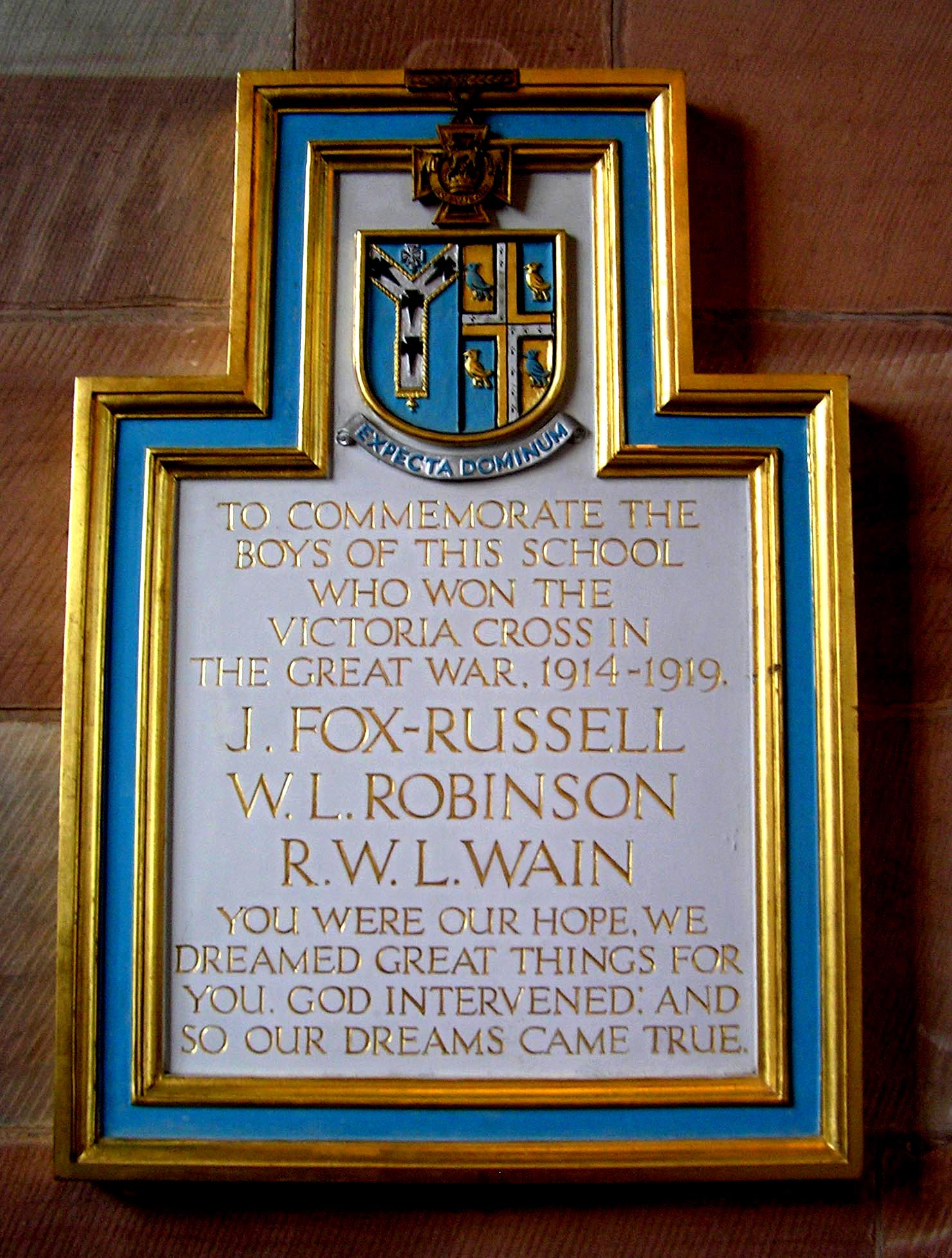
The VC memorial in St Bees School chapel.

Robinson was repatriated in early December 1918, and was able to spend Christmas with his friends and family. However, this freedom was short-lived. He contracted the Spanish flu and died on 31 December 1918 at the Stanmore home of his sister, Baroness Heyking. It was thought that his imprisonment had left him particularly susceptible. He was buried at All Saints' Churchyard Extension in Harrow Weald, with great ceremony. Thousands turned up to line the route of the procession, which was led by the Central Band of the RAF, and a fly-past of aircraft dropped a wreath which was laid on the grave.

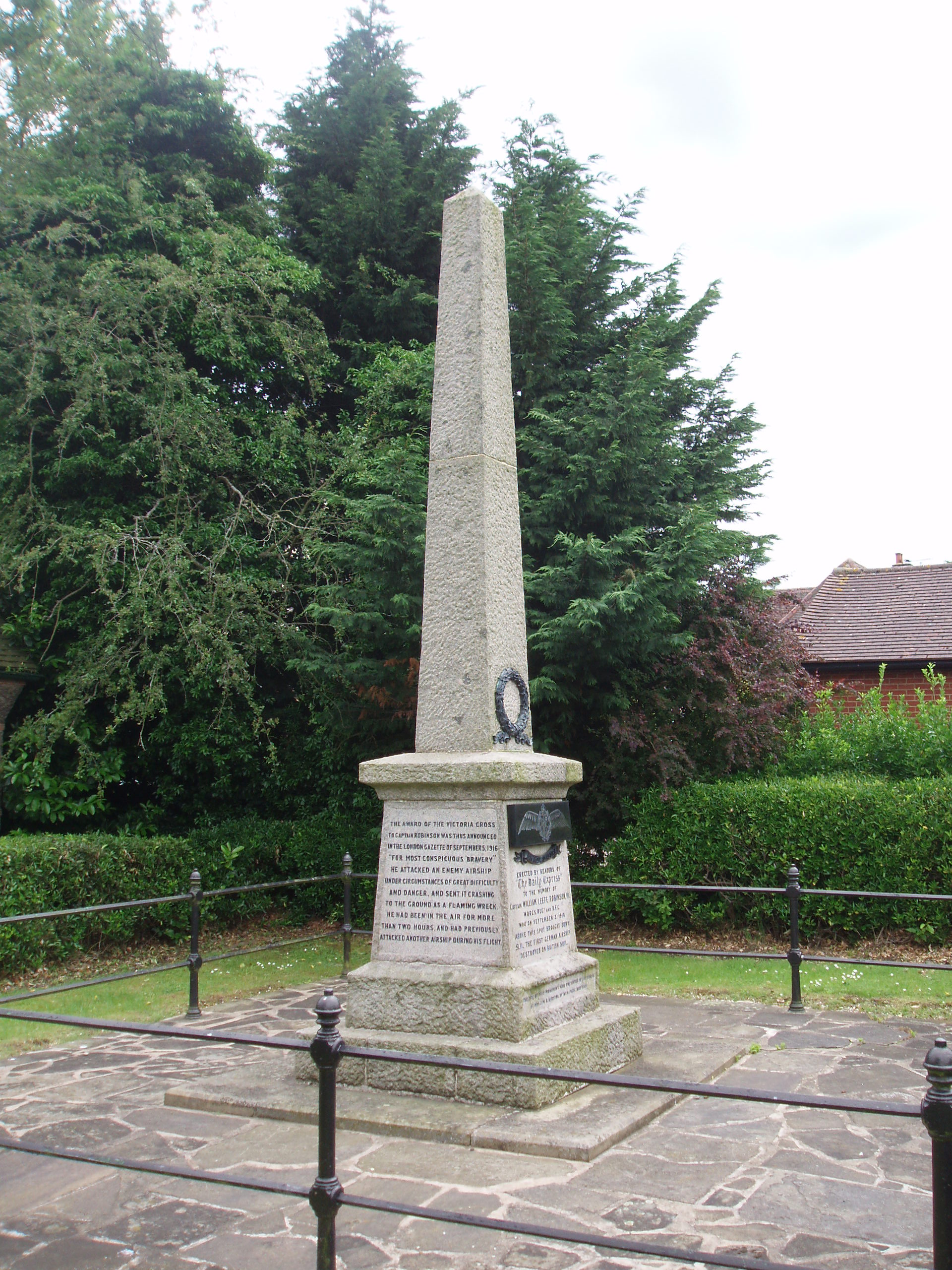
Memorial to William Leefe Robinson at Cuffley.

== Memorials ==
A memorial to Robinson was erected on the East Ridgeway in Cuffley, close to the spot where the airship crashed. The site was donated by Mrs J M B Kidson of Nun Park, Northaw, and the monument itself was paid for by readers of the Daily Express newspaper. It takes the form of a Cornish granite obelisk, 5.1 metres (17 ft) tall, and bears Royal Flying Corps "wings" along with the following inscription:

To the memory of Captain William Leefe Robinson VC, Worcs. Regt and R.F.C. who on 3 September 1916 above this spot brought down SL11, the first German airship destroyed on British soil.

The monument was unveiled in front of a large crowd on 9 June 1921, by Freddie Guest, the Secretary of State for Air. The inscription originally identified the airship as Z21, but this was corrected in 1966. It was renovated and ceremonially rededicated on 3 September 1986 by Air Chief Marshal Sir Michael Stear. It was restored again between December 2007 and March 2008 as it was subsiding on one corner. A service of commemoration was held on 31 December 2018 led by Reverend Christopher Kilgour, the Vicar of the Parish of Northaw and Cuffley, on the date of the 100th anniversary of Leefe Robinson's death. An exhibition of photographs and memorabilia relating to Robinson was displayed in Cuffley Hall afterwards.

A road is named after him (Robinson Close) in Hornchurch, Essex, on the site of the former Suttons Farm airfield. He appears in a short segment of a wartime newsreel, although the location and date of the recorded event are unknown. Robinson's name appears on the triple VC memorial in St Bees School chapel, which was dedicated in 1932. His name also appears on the memorial at the Madikeri (Coorg) museum.

He is commemorated by the name of the local Miller & Carter steakhouse just south of the cemetery, the Leefe Robinson VC on the Uxbridge Road, Harrow Weald. This building was originally opened as The Leefe Robinson Restaurant in 1954, and contained a display of artifacts including the propeller from a BE2c aircraft; however these were destroyed by a fire in the 1960s, but the name was preserved when it reopened as a Berni Inn.

In April 2010, to celebrate the 100th anniversary of the Great Northern Route extension that connects Grange Park to Cuffley, the First Capital Connect rail company named a Class 313 train Captain William Leefe Robinson VC.

== See also ==
- Reginald Warneford – another VC awarded for bringing down the first Zeppelin.
