= List of Schütte-Lanz airships =

Most Schütte-Lanz airships were made of plywood rather than aluminium alloy. Despite this, Schütte-Lanz introduced many design innovations that were soon adopted by competitor Zeppelin. Depicted here is the SL 20 on one of her test flights at Mannheim-Rheinau.

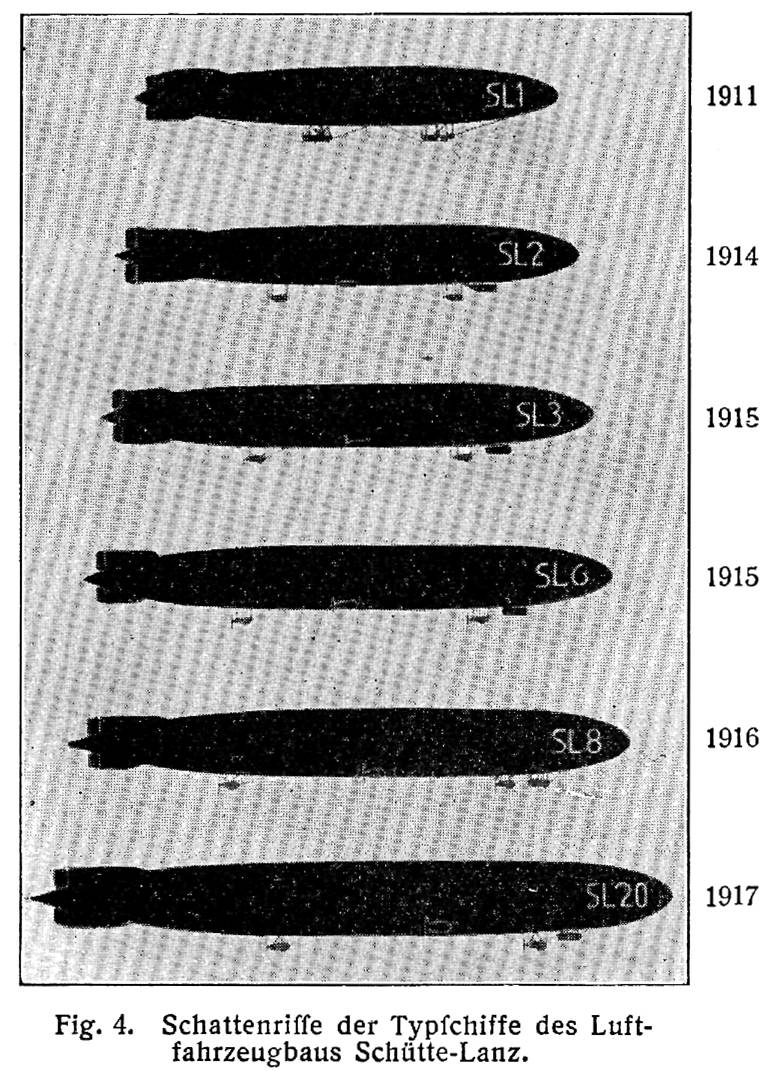
Silhouettes demonstrate the relative sizes of six SL airships.

Schütte-Lanz (SL) airships were a series of rigid airships designed and built by the Luftschiffbau Schütte-Lanz company from 1909 until 1917. One research and four passenger airships were planned for post-war use, but were never built. The Schütte-Lanz company was an early competitor of the more famous airships built by Ferdinand von Zeppelin. It is common for all rigid airships to be informally called zeppelins regardless of their manufacturer, and Schütte-Lanz airships are often referred to as such, but the Zeppelin name technically only applies to those manufactured by the Zeppelin company.

== History ==
When the Zeppelin LZ 4 met with disaster at Echterdingen in 1908, Professor Johann Schütte (1873–1940) started to consider the problems of airship design. He decided, with the co-operation of his students, to develop his own scientifically designed, high-performance airship. In partnership with Dr Karl Lanz, an industrialist and wood products manufacturer, he started constructing the Schütte-Lanz Luftschiffbau on 22 April 1909. The airships were successful at first, and introduced a number of highly successful innovations.

Wood composites had a theoretical superiority as the structural material for airships up to a certain size, after which the superior strength of aluminum (and later duralumin) in tension was more important than the superior strength of wood in compression. Schütte-Lanz airships until 1918 were made of wood and plywood glued together. Moisture tended to degrade the integrity of the glued joints. Schütte-Lanz airships became structurally unsound when water entered the airship's imperfectly waterproofed envelope. This tended to happen during wet weather, but also, more insidiously, in defective or damaged hangars. In the words of Führer der Luftschiffe Peter Strasser: "Most of the Schütte-Lanz ships are not usable under combat conditions, especially those operated by the Navy, because their wooden construction cannot cope with the damp conditions inseparable from maritime service."

The decision was made to compensate the company for the unusable wooden ships, and in response the company started work on a tubular aluminum-framed ship which was probably not completed.

The German Navy had bases closer to the sea, and thus more humid. They were reluctant to accept wooden composite craft. As a result, the primary customer for Schütte-Lanz airships was the German Army. The German Army decided well before the German Navy that airship operations were futile in the face of land-based heavier-than-air opposition.

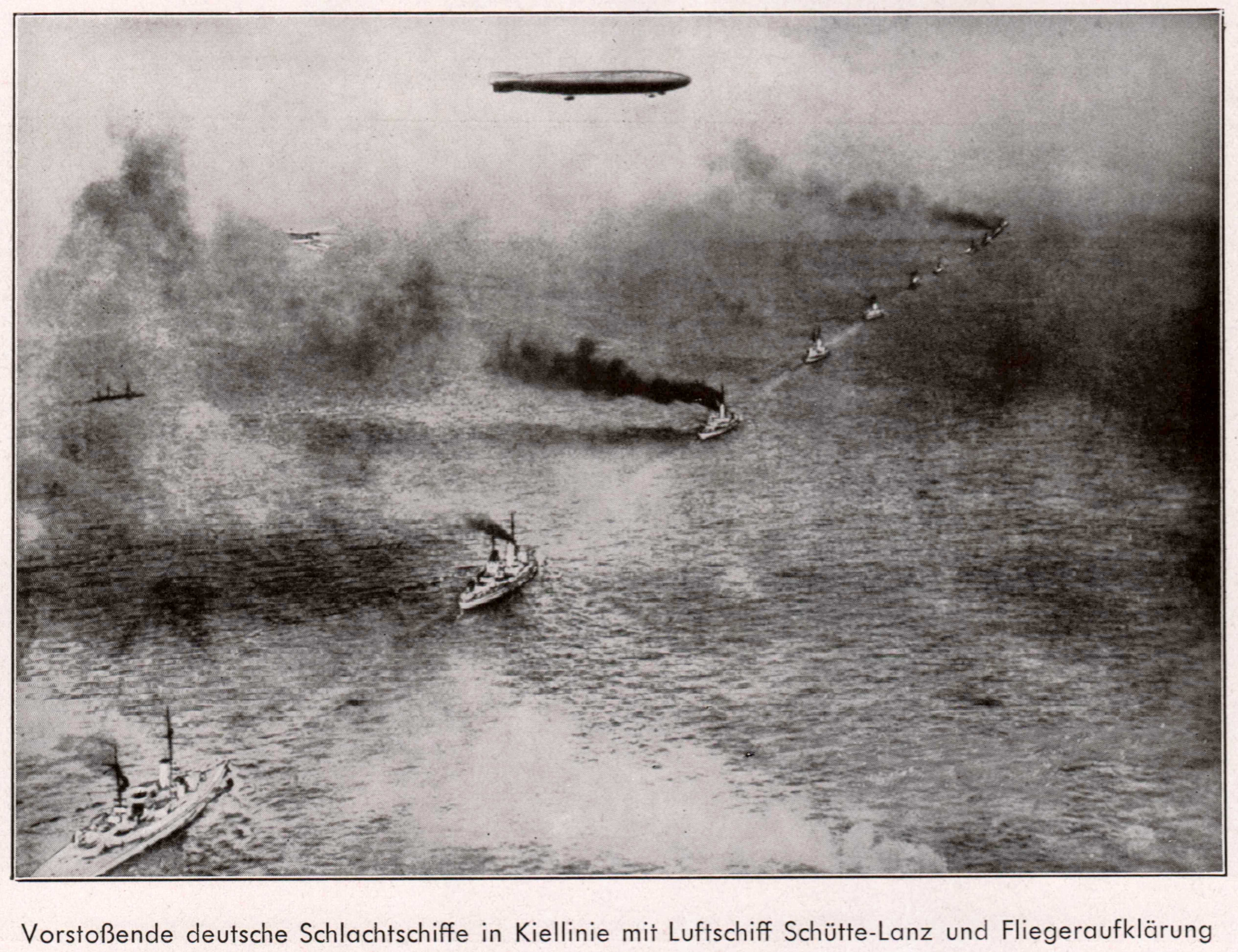
SL airship on a reconnaissance flight with German battleships.

Twenty-four Schütte-Lanz airships were designed before the end of the World War I, most of which the company was not paid for due to the collapse of the German monarchy. By the time the last eight ships were ready, most of them could not be operated due to the loss of trained crews.

In the postwar period, Lanz designed a series of very large airships for trans-Atlantic and trans-Pacific passenger operations, as well as submitting a proposal for the US Navy's rigid airships ZRS-4 and ZRS-5. However, none of these was ever realised.

Data from: Zeppelin: rigid airships 1893–1940

== SL.I (Type A) ==
The Schütte-Lanz airship SL.I was the first of 20 airships built by the company. Construction was carried out in a large hangar at Rheinau near Mannheim. The ship was powered by four 125 hp (127 PS; 93 kW) Daimler-Benz engines installed in two ventral gondolas. A distinctive feature of the Schütte-Lanz ships was that the frame was constructed from special plywood which was (supposedly) waterproofed and protected from frost. The SL.I was constructed with a diamond lattice frame and had a highly streamlined shape, allowing it to achieve a record speed of 38.3 km/h (23.8 mph; 20.7 kn). The structure of the SL.I resembles the later "geodesic" structures of Barnes Wallis at Vickers or Buckminster Fuller's domes. It was only matched at the time by the structure of the MacMeecham airship, designed and partially built in England in the first years of World War I. Fifty-three experimental flights were made between October 1911 and December 1912, the longest of over 16 hours. The ship was handed over to the German Army on 12 December 1912 but destroyed soon afterwards when it broke loose from its temporary mooring during a storm.

- First Flight: 1 October 1911
- Length: 131 m (430 ft)
- Diameter: 18.4 m (60 ft)
- Gas Capacity:19,000 m^{3} (670,000 cu ft)
- Performance: 38.3 km/h (23.8 mph; 20.7 kn)
- Payload: 4.5 t (4,500 kg; 9,900 lb)
- Engines: 2x Daimler J8L 8-cyl in-line engines: 500 hp (510 PS; 370 kW) total

== SL.II (Type B) ==
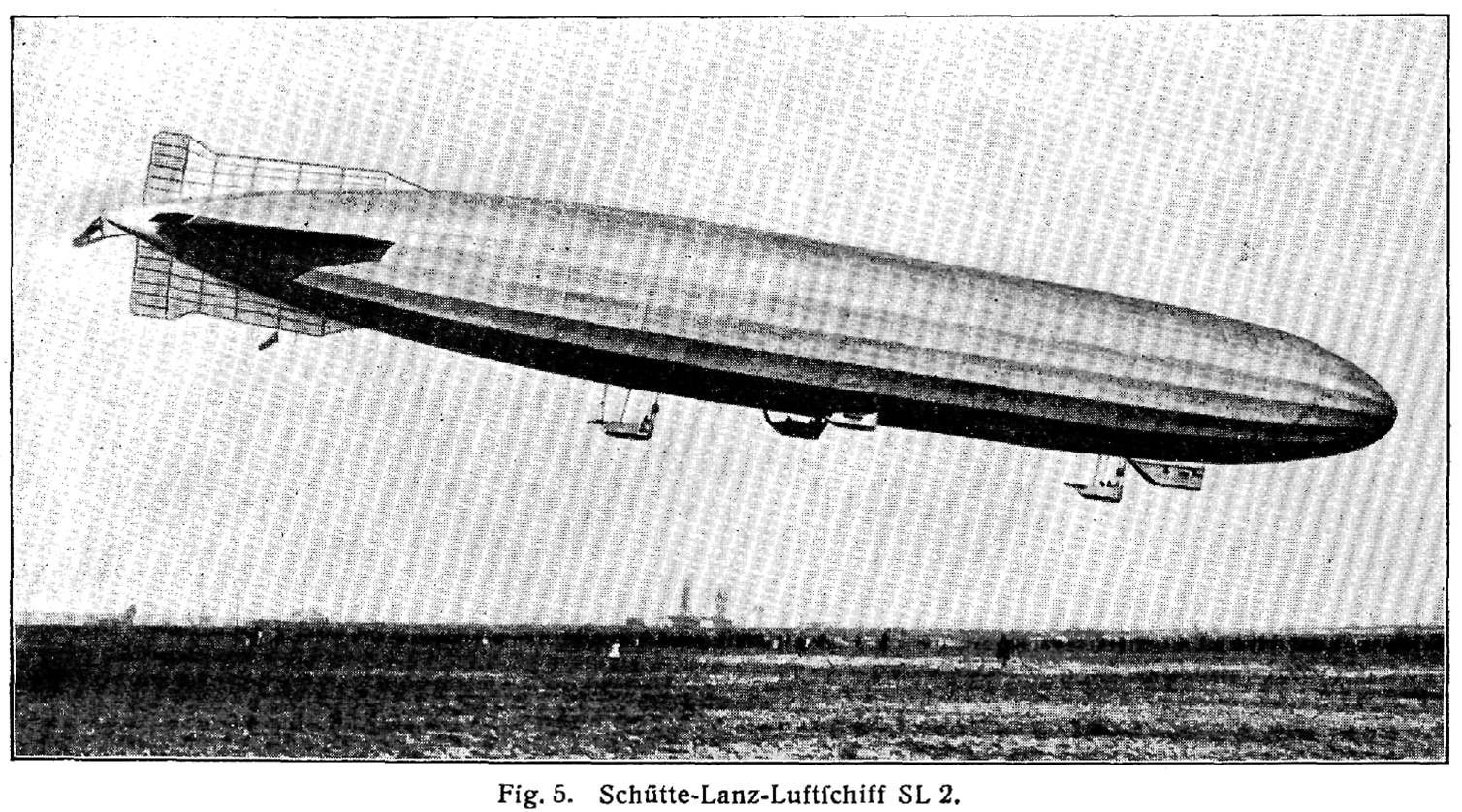
The four engine gondolas hang under the hull in this image from the 1920 Lexikon der gesamten Technik.

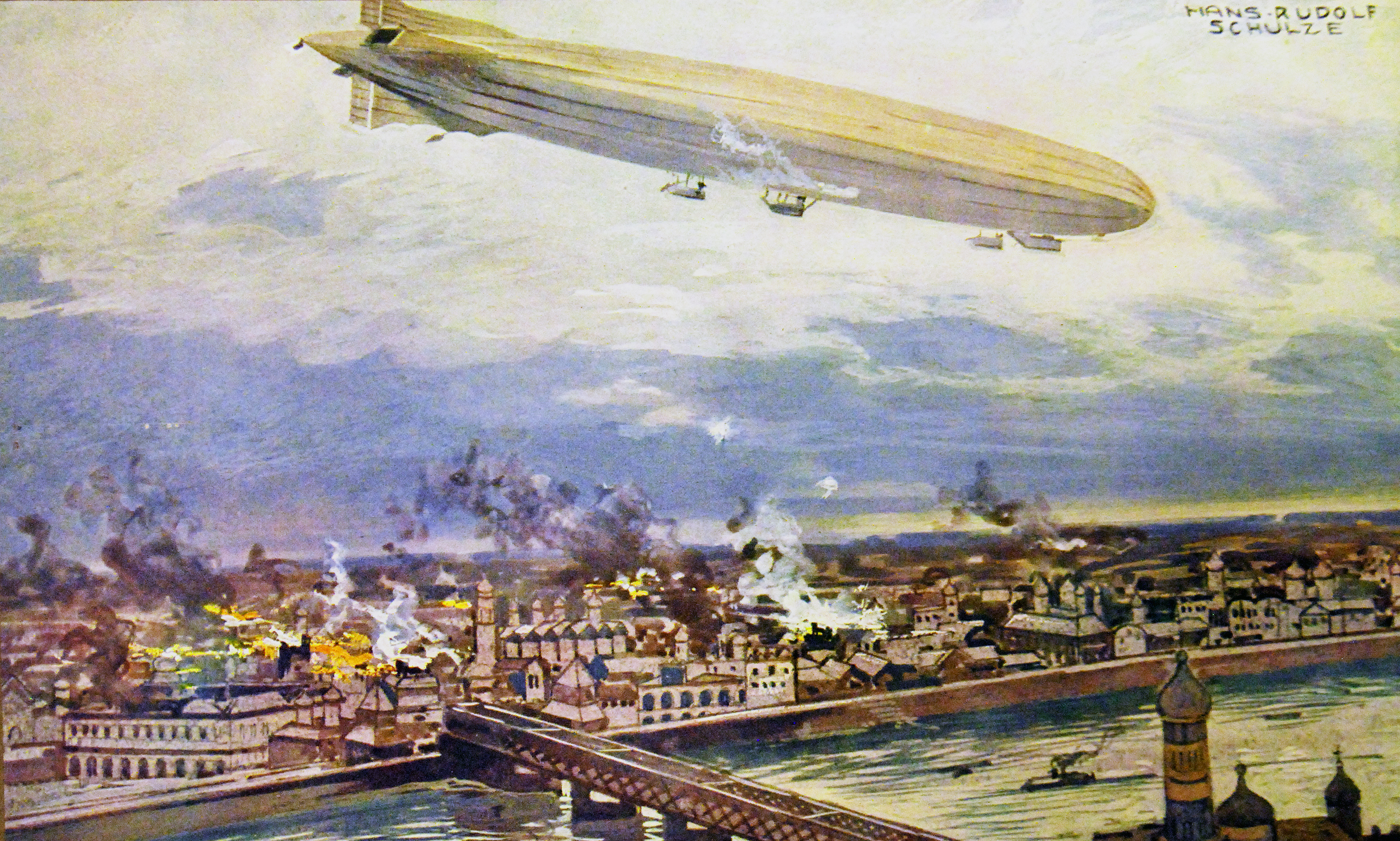
Schütte-Lanz S.L.2 bombing Warsaw in 1914

The Schütte-Lanz airship S.L.2 surpassed the contemporary Zeppelin airships in performance. It adopted the Zeppelin ring-girder construction method, but retained the streamlined shape and plywood construction of the SL.I. The SL.2 was also the most significant airship to date in that it laid down two vital design innovations that were copied in almost all subsequent rigid airships. The first was the cruciform tail plane, with a single pair of rudders and elevators. The second was the location of the engines in separate streamlined gondolas or cars. A third innovation, for war service, was the mounting of heavy machine guns for defense against attacking aircraft in each of the engine cars. SL.2 was built between January and May 1914 and transferred to Austrian military control as the SL.II. It carried out six missions in the first year of the war over Poland and France. After being enlarged in summer 1915, several more missions were carried out before SL.2 was stranded at Luckenwalde on 10 January 1916 after running out of fuel and decommissioned. The SL.2 demonstrated the Schütte-Lanz wood girder's advantage in compression as opposed to tension allowed the Schütte-Lanz type of airship to be technically superior until a certain size had been reached.

- First Flight: 28 February 1914
- Length: 144 m (472 ft) (156 m (512 ft) after rebuild)
- Diameter: 18.2 m (60 ft) (18.2 m (60 ft) after rebuild)
- Gas Capacity: 25,000 m^{3} (880,000 cu ft) (27,500 m^{3} (970,000 cu ft) after rebuild)
- Performance: 88.2 km/h (54.8 mph; 47.6 kn) (89.3 km/h (55.5 mph; 48.2 kn) after rebuild)
- Payload: 8 tonnes 10.4 t (10,400 kg; 23,000 lb)
- Engines: 4× Maybach C-X 6-cyl in-line engines:720 hp (730 PS; 540 kW) total (840 hp (850 PS; 630 kW) total after rebuild)

== SL.3 (Type C) ==
Naval airship based at Seddin which flew 30 reconnaissance missions and one bombing mission over England. The highlight of SL.3's career was its attack on the British submarine E4 on 24 September 1915. The structure of the ship degraded because of atmospheric exposure and the ship was stranded near Riga on 1 May 1916.

- First Flight: 4 February 1915
- Length: 153.1 m (502 ft)
- Diameter: 19.75 m (65 ft)
- Gas Capacity: 32,390 m^{3} (1,144,000 cu ft)
- Performance: 84.6 km/h (52.6 mph; 45.7 kn)
- Payload: 13.2 t (13,200 kg; 29,000 lb)
- Engines: 4x Maybach C-X 6-cyl in-line engines: 840 hp (850 PS; 630 kW) total

== SL.4 (Type C) ==
Naval airship based at Seddin. SL.4 flew 21 reconnaissance missions and two bombing raids against enemy harbours on the Eastern front. It was destroyed on 14 December 1915 after its hangar collapsed due to snow accumulation on the roof.

- First Flight: 2 May 1915
- Length: 153.1 m (502 ft)
- Diameter: 19.75 m (65 ft)
- Gas Capacity: 32,470 m^{3} (1,147,000 cu ft)
- Performance: 85 km/h (53 mph; 46 kn)
- Payload: 13.4 t (13,400 kg; 30,000 lb)
- Engines:4x Maybach C-X 6-cyl in-line engines:840 hp (850 PS; 630 kW) total

== SL.5 (Type C) ==
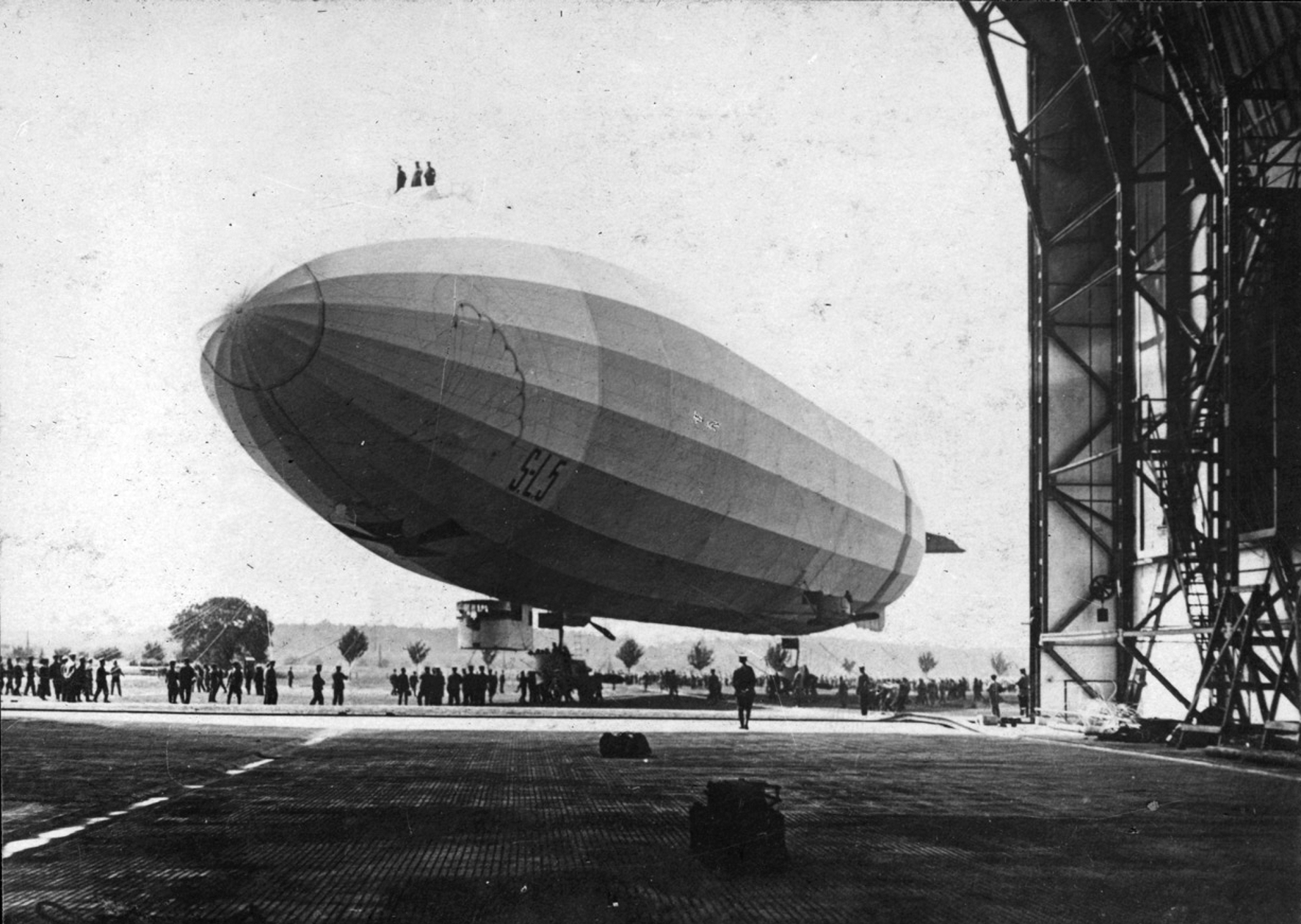
Airship SL 5 being moved from the Darmstadt hangar.

SL.5 was an army airship, based at Darmstadt. The structure was damaged during the first flight, but repaired after several months work. During its second flight the ship was forced down by bad weather at Giessen and stricken from service on 5 July 1915.

- First Flight: 4 February 1915
- Length: 153.1 m (502 ft)
- Diameter: 19.75 m (65 ft)
- Gas Capacity: 32,470 m^{3} (1,147,000 cu ft)
- Performance:83.2 km/h (51.7 mph; 44.9 kn)
- Payload: 14.3 t (14,300 kg; 32,000 lb)
- Engines: 4x Maybach C-X 6-cyl in-line engines:840 hp (850 PS; 630 kW) total

== SL.6 (Type 'd') ==
Naval airship based at Seddin. Flew six reconnaissance missions, but exploded due to unknown causes with the loss of all hands while taking off on 10 November 1915.

- First Flight: 9 October 1915
- Length: 162.1 m (532 ft)
- Diameter: 19.75 m (65 ft)
- Gas Capacity:35,130 m^{3} (1,241,000 cu ft)
- Performance: 92.9 km/h (57.7 mph; 50.2 kn)
- Payload: 15.8 t (15,800 kg; 35,000 lb)
- Engines: 4x Maybach C-X 6-cyl in-line engines:840 hp (850 PS; 630 kW) total

== SL.7 (Type D) ==
Army airship based at Königsberg. Carried out three reconnaissance missions and three bombing raids before suffering structural failure. Repaired and possibly enlarged before being decommissioned 6 March 1917 when the army terminated airship operations.

- First Flight: 3 September 1915
- Length: 162.1 m (532 ft)
- Diameter: 19.75 m (65 ft)
- Gas Capacity:35,130 m^{3} (1,241,000 cu ft)
- Performance: 92.9 km/h (57.7 mph; 50.2 kn)
- Payload: 15.6 t (15,600 kg; 34,000 lb)
- Engines: 4x Maybach C-X 6-cyl in-line engines:840 hp (850 PS; 630 kW) total

== SL.8 (Type E) ==
Naval airship based at Seddin. Carried out 34 reconnaissance missions and three bombing raids, carrying 4,000 kg of bombs each mission. Held the record for the greatest number of combat missions of any Schütte-Lanz airship. Decommissioned due to age 20 November 1917.

- First Flight: 30 March 1916
- Length: 174 m (571 ft)
- Diameter: 20.1 m (66 ft)
- Gas Capacity: 38,780 m^{3} (1,370,000 cu ft)
- Performance:96.8 km/h (60.1 mph; 52.3 kn)
- Payload: 18.7 t (18,700 kg; 41,000 lb)
- Engines: 4x Maybach HS-Lu 6-cyl in-line engines:960 hp (970 PS; 720 kW) total

== SL.9 (Type E) ==
Naval airship based at Seddin. Carried out 13 reconnaissance missions and four bombing raids carrying 4,230 kg (9,330 lb) of bombs each mission. Crashed in the Baltic Sea, possibly after lightning strike on 30 March 1917.

- First Flight: 30 March 1916
- Length: 174 m (571 ft)
- Diameter: 20.1 m (66 ft)
- Gas Capacity: 38,780 m^{3} (1,370,000 cu ft)
- Performance:92.9 km/h (57.7 mph; 50.2 kn)
- Payload: 19.8 t (19,800 kg; 44,000 lb)
- Engines: 4x Maybach HS-Lu 6-cyl in-line engines:960 hp (970 PS; 720 kW) total

== SL.10 (Type E) ==
Army airship based at Yambol, Bulgaria. Carried out a 16-hour reconnaissance mission. Disappeared during a subsequent attack on Sevastopol, possibly due to bad weather 28 July 1916.

- First Flight: 30 March 1916
- Length: 174 m (571 ft)
- Diameter: 20.1 m (66 ft)
- Gas Capacity: 38,800 m^{3} (1,370,000 cu ft)
- Performance: 90 km/h (56 mph; 49 kn)
- Payload: 21.5 t (21,500 kg; 47,000 lb)
- Engines: 4x Maybach HS-Lu 6-cyl in-line engines:960 hp (970 PS; 720 kW) total

== SL.11 (Type E) ==
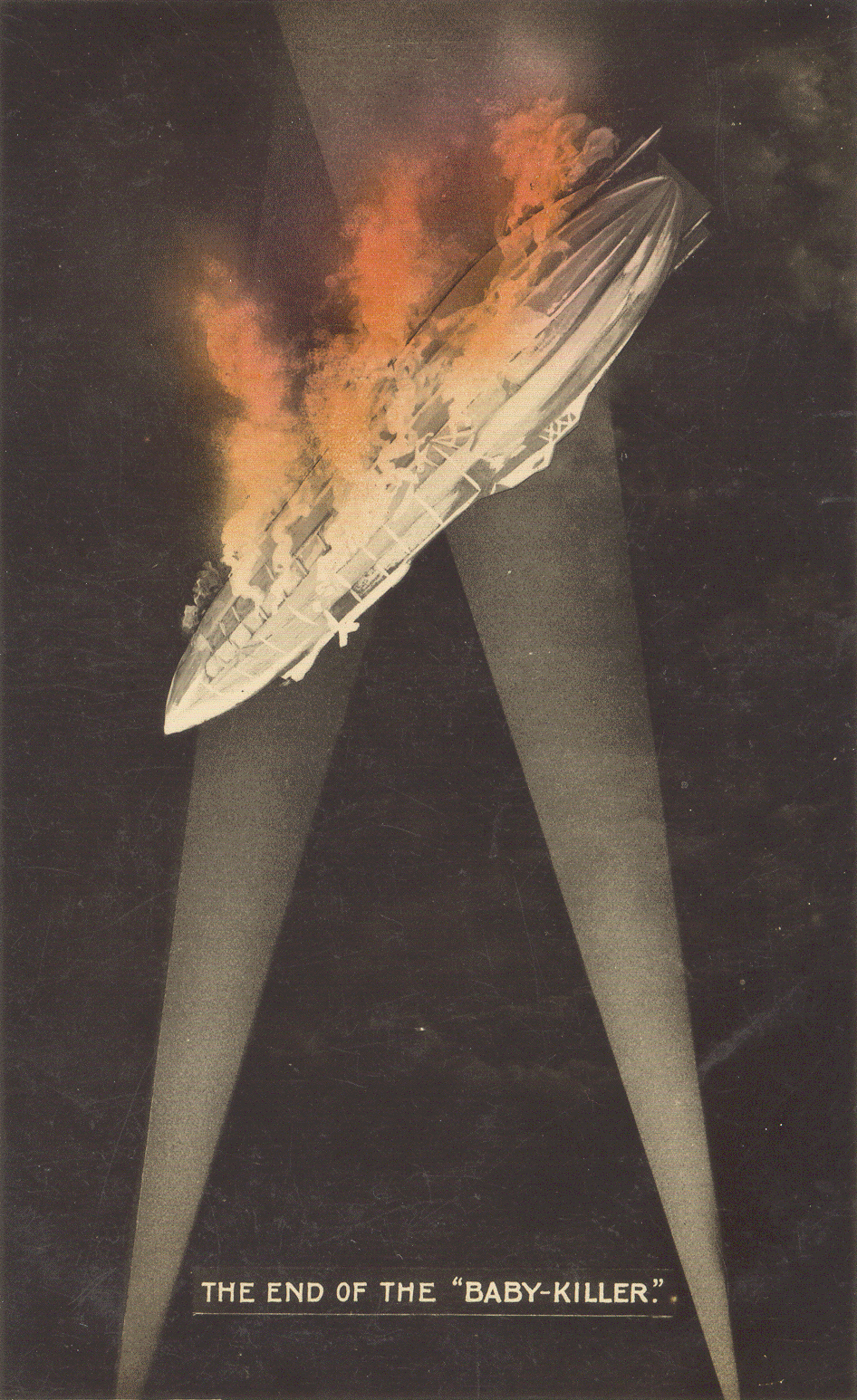
British propaganda postcard, entitled "The End of the 'Baby-Killer'" S.L.11

Army airship based at Spich. Commanded by Hauptmann Wilhelm Schramm. The first German airship to be shot down over Britain; it was attacked over Hertfordshire by Lt. W.L. Robinson in a BE.2C with incendiary ammunition on 3 September 1916. It crashed at Cuffley, having bombed St Albans. The crew were buried at Potters Bar Cemetery: and in 1962 they were re-interred at Cannock Chase German war cemetery.

- First Flight: 1 August 1916
- Length: 174 m (571 ft)
- Diameter: 20.1 m (66 ft)
- Gas Capacity: 38,780 m^{3} (1,370,000 cu ft)
- Performance: 91.8 km/h (57.0 mph; 49.6 kn)
- Payload: 21 t (21,000 kg; 46,000 lb)
- Engines: 4x Maybach HS-Lu 6-cyl in-line engines:960 hp (970 PS; 720 kW) total

== SL.12 (Type E) ==
Navy airship based at Ahlhorn. Obsolete in design before completion, this airship only flew reconnaissance missions. Badly damaged after hitting gas-holder near hangar and stricken 28 December 1916

- First Flight: 9 November 1916
- Length: 174 m (571 ft)
- Diameter: 20.1 m (66 ft)
- Gas Capacity: 38,780 m^{3} (1,370,000 cu ft)
- Performance: 86.4 km/h (53.7 mph; 46.7 kn)
- Payload: 21 t (21,000 kg; 46,000 lb)
- Engines: 4x Maybach HS-Lu 6-cyl in-line engines:960 hp (970 PS; 720 kW) total

== SL.13 (Type E) ==
Army airship based at Leipzig. Considered unfit for combat duty and used for training only. Badly damaged when hangar collapsed because of heavy snow and stricken 8 February 1917.

- First Flight: 29 October 1916
- Length: 174 m (571 ft)
- Diameter: 20.1 m (66 ft)
- Gas Capacity: 38,780 m^{3} (1,370,000 cu ft)
- Performance: 90 km/h (56 mph; 49 kn)
- Payload: 20.5 t (20,500 kg; 45,000 lb)
- Engines: 4x Maybach HS-Lu 6-cyl in-line engines:960 hp (970 PS; 720 kW) total

== SL.14 (Type E) ==
Navy airship based at Seerappen and Wainoden. Carried out two reconnaissance missions and two bombing raids. A later attack on Riga was abandoned because of engine failure. Rebuilt February 1917 but later damaged before finally being scrapped on 18 May 1917.

- First Flight: 16 May 1916
- Length: 174 m (571 ft)
- Diameter: 20.1 m (66 ft)
- Gas Capacity: 38,800 m^{3} (1,370,000 cu ft)
- Performance: 93.6 km/h (58.2 mph; 50.5 kn)
- Payload: 20.5 t (20,500 kg; 45,000 lb)
- Engines: 4x Maybach HS-Lu 6-cyl in-line engines:960 hp (970 PS; 720 kW) total

== SL.15 (Type E) ==
Army airship based at Mannheim. No active service. Decommissioned August 1917.

- First Flight: 4 November 1916
- Length: 174 m (571 ft)
- Diameter: 20.1 m (66 ft)
- Gas Capacity: 38,780 m^{3} (1,370,000 cu ft)
- Performance: 95.4 km/h (59.3 mph; 51.5 kn)
- Payload: 21.5 t (21,500 kg; 47,000 lb)
- Engines: 4x Maybach HS-Lu 6-cyl in-line engines:960 hp (970 PS; 720 kW) total

== SL.16 (Type E) ==
Intended for the Army, this ship was never officially commissioned and was laid up at Spich. Scrapped August 1917.

- First Flight:18 January 1917
- Length: 174 m (571 ft)
- Diameter: 20.1 m (66 ft)
- Gas Capacity: 38,800 m^{3} (1,370,000 cu ft)
- Performance: 95.4 km/h (59.3 mph; 51.5 kn)
- Payload: 21.5 t (21,500 kg; 47,000 lb)
- Engines: 4x Maybach HS-Lu 6-cyl in-line engines:960 hp (970 PS; 720 kW) total

== SL.17 (Type E) ==
Intended for the Army, this ship was never officially commissioned and was laid up at Allenstein. Scrapped August 1917.

- First Flight: 19 April 1917
- Length: 174 m (571 ft)
- Diameter: 20.1 m (66 ft)
- Gas Capacity: 38,780 m^{3} (1,370,000 cu ft)
- Performance: 95.4 km/h (59.3 mph; 51.5 kn)
- Payload: 21.5 t (21,500 kg; 47,000 lb)
- Engines: 4x Maybach HS-Lu 6-cyl in-line engines: 960 hp (970 PS; 720 kW) total

== SL.18 (Type E) ==
Construction completed at Leipzig base, but ship destroyed by hangar collapse on 8 February 1917.

- First Flight: N/A
- Length: 174 m (571 ft)
- Diameter: 20.1 m (66 ft)
- Gas Capacity: 38,800 m^{3} (1,370,000 cu ft)
- Performance: N/A
- Payload: 21.5 t (21,500 kg; 47,000 lb)
- Engines: 4x Maybach HS-Lu 6-cyl in-line engines: 960 hp (970 PS; 720 kW) total

== SL.19 (Type E) ==
Never built due to lack of space at Leipzig base, due to hangar collapse on 8 February 1917.

- First Flight: N/A
- Length: 174 m (571 ft)
- Diameter: 20.1 m (66 ft)
- Gas Capacity: 38,800 m^{3} (1,370,000 cu ft)
- Performance: N/A
- Payload:21.5 t (21,500 kg; 47,000 lb)
- Engines: 4x Maybach HS-Lu 6-cyl in-line engines: 960 hp (970 PS; 720 kW) total

== SL.20 (Type F) ==
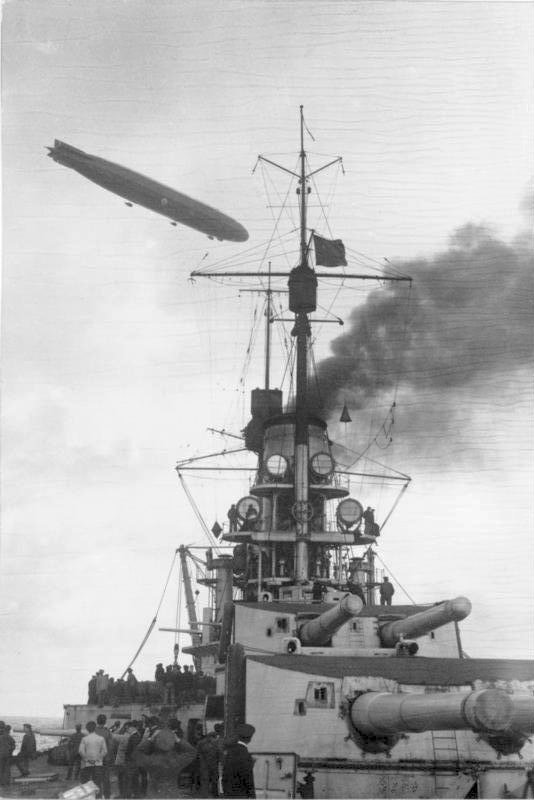
The SL 20 flying over the German battleship SMS Großer Kurfürst, Operation Albion in October 1917. Both the SL 8 and SL 20 participated in Operation Albion for reconnaissance.

Navy ship based at Ahlhorn. Burnt in huge hangar explosion and fire with four zeppelin airships on 5 January 1918 after only two missions.

- First Flight: 9 September 1917
- Length: 198.3 m (651 ft)
- Diameter: 22.96 m (75 ft)
- Gas Capacity: 56,000 m^{3} (2,000,000 cu ft)
- Performance: 102.6 km/h (63.8 mph; 55.4 kn)
- Payload: 35.5 t (35,500 kg; 78,000 lb)
- Engines: 5x Maybach HS-Lu 6-cyl in-line engines: 1,200 hp (1,200 PS; 890 kW) total

== SL.21 (Type F) ==
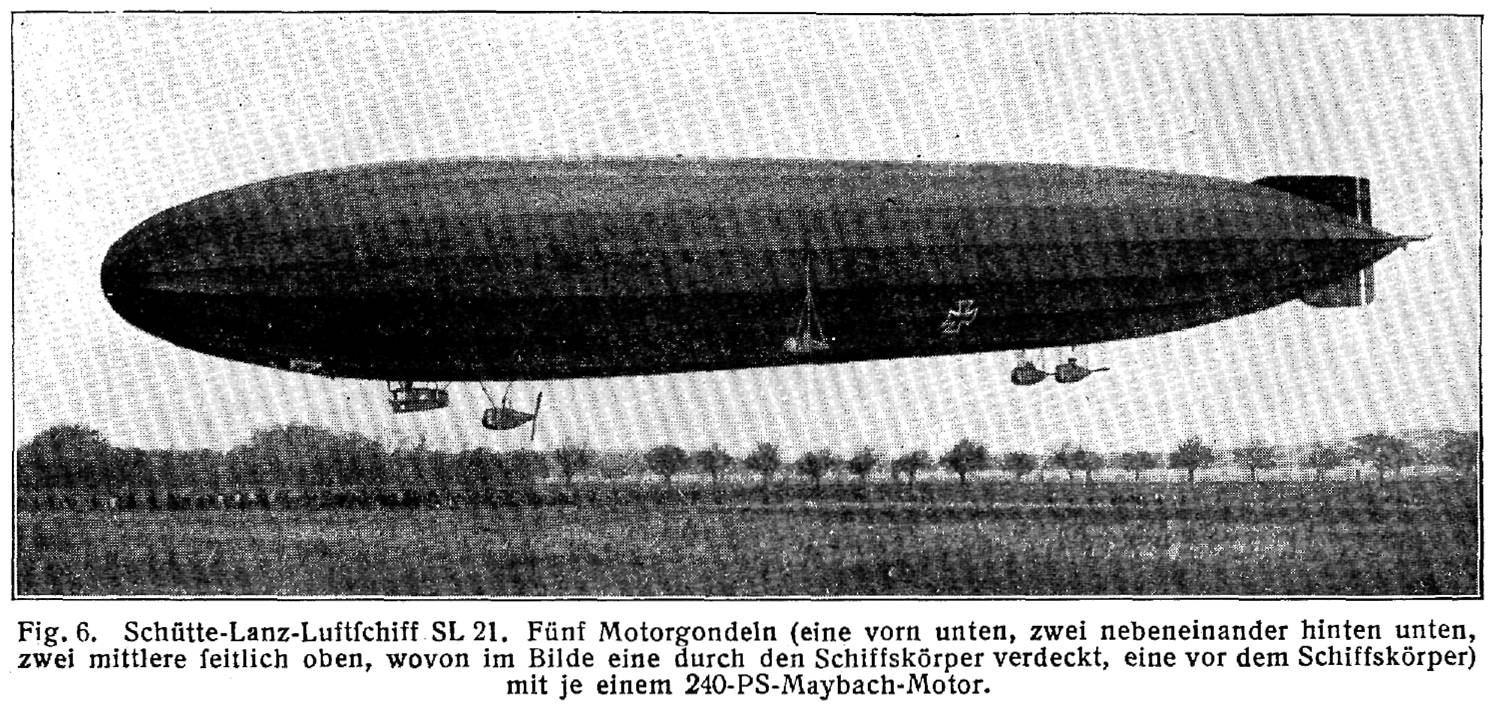
Two-bladed props can be seen on two of the five engines

Intended for Army but never officially commissioned. Based at Zeesen and used for static testing. Decommissioned February 1918.

- First Flight: 26 November 1917
- Length: 198.3 m (651 ft)
- Diameter: 22.96 m (75 ft)
- Gas Capacity: 56,350 m^{3} (1,990,000 cu ft)
- Performance: 102.6 km/h (63.8 mph; 55.4 kn)
- Payload:36 t (36,000 kg; 79,000 lb)
- Engines: 5x Maybach HS-Lu 6-cyl in-line engines: 1,200 hp (1,200 PS; 890 kW) total

== SL.22 (Type F) ==
Intended for Navy but refused acceptance on grounds of insufficient payload. Based at Gegen and scrapped June 1920.

- First Flight: 5 June 1918
- Length: 198.3 m (651 ft)
- Diameter: 22.96 m (75 ft)
- Gas Capacity: 56,350 m^{3} (1,990,000 cu ft)
- Performance: 95.4 km/h (59.3 mph; 51.5 kn)
- Payload: 37.5 t (37,500 kg; 83,000 lb)
- Engines: 5x Maybach HS-Lu 6-cyl in-line engines: 1,200 hp (1,200 PS; 890 kW) total

== SL.23 (Type G) ==
Never commissioned. First Schütte-Lanz ship with tubular aluminum frame. May have been complete at war's end but no further details are known.

- First Flight: N/A
- Length: 202 m (663 ft)
- Diameter: 25.4 m (83 ft)
- Gas Capacity: 68,800 m^{3} (2,430,000 cu ft)
- Performance: 122.4 km/h (76.1 mph; 66.1 kn)
- Payload:46 t (46,000 kg; 101,000 lb)
- Engines: 8x Maybach HS-Lu 6-cyl in-line engines: 2,240 hp (2,270 PS; 1,670 kW) total

== SL.24 (Type H) ==
Never commissioned. Second Schütte-Lanz ship with tubular aluminum frame. May have been completed after war, but no further details.

- First Flight: N/A
- Length: 232 m (761 ft)
- Diameter: 25.4 m (83 ft)
- Gas Capacity: 78,800 m^{3} (2,780,000 cu ft)
- Performance: 116.6 km/h (72.5 mph; 63.0 kn)
- Payload: 59.5 t (59,500 kg; 131,000 lb)
- Engines: 8x Maybach HS-Lu 6-cyl in-line engines: 2,240 hp (2,270 PS; 1,670 kW) total

== SL.101 ==
After the war, Schütte-Lanz came up with several peacetime airship projects which were never realised. Based on the metal framed SL.23 and SL.24, the first was the SL.101. This was intended for a regular transatlantic service to New York or South America.

- First Flight: N/A
- Length: 228.5 m (750 ft)
- Diameter: 28.75 m (94 ft)
- Gas Capacity: 101,700 m^{3} (3,590,000 cu ft)
- Performance: 130 km/h (81 mph; 70 kn)
- Payload: N/A
- Engines: N/A

== SL.102 Panamerica ==
This was intended for a regular transatlantic service to New York or South America.

- First Flight: N/A
- Length: 298 m (978 ft)
- Diameter: 38.54 m (126 ft)
- Gas Capacity: 220,000 m^{3} (7,800,000 cu ft)
- Performance: 130 km/h (81 mph; 70 kn)
- Payload: N/A
- Engines: N/A

== SL.103 Pacific ==
This was intended for a regular transatlantic service to New York or South America, although the name indicates different aspirations.

- First Flight: N/A
- Length: 274.5 m (901 ft)
- Diameter: 34.77 m (114 ft)
- Gas Capacity: 150,000 m^{3} (5,300,000 cu ft)
- Performance: 130 km/h (81 mph; 70 kn)
- Payload: N/A
- Engines: N/A

== American airship tender ==
Schütte-Lanz submitted an unsuccessful design to the U.S. Navy in 1926 in competition with the successful Goodyear-Zeppelin designs, USS Akron and USS Macon.

== See also ==
- R31 class airship
- List of Parseval airships
- List of Zeppelins
- Aviation in World War I
- Zeppelin
