= Luftschiffhafen Seddin =

Coordinates: 54°30′42″N 17°06′37″E

Luftschiffhafen Seddin was a German military airship port in Pomerania during the First World War. Named after a tiny place in Landkreis Stolp, Seddin was a base was for Schütte-Lanz airships.

The large hangar survived until 1989 when it burned down.
