= Spich =

- Ortschaft of Troisdorf
- Interactive map of Spich
- Location within Germany Location within North Rhine-Westphalia
- Coordinates: 50°49′39.84″N 7°7′4.73″E
- Country: Germany
- State: North Rhine-Westphalia
- District: Rhein-Sieg-Kreis
- Town: Troisdorf

Population (2023-01-01)
  - Total: 13,170
- Time zone: UTC+01:00 (CET)
  - Summer (DST): UTC+02:00 (CEST)
- Postal codes: 53842
- Dialling codes: 02241

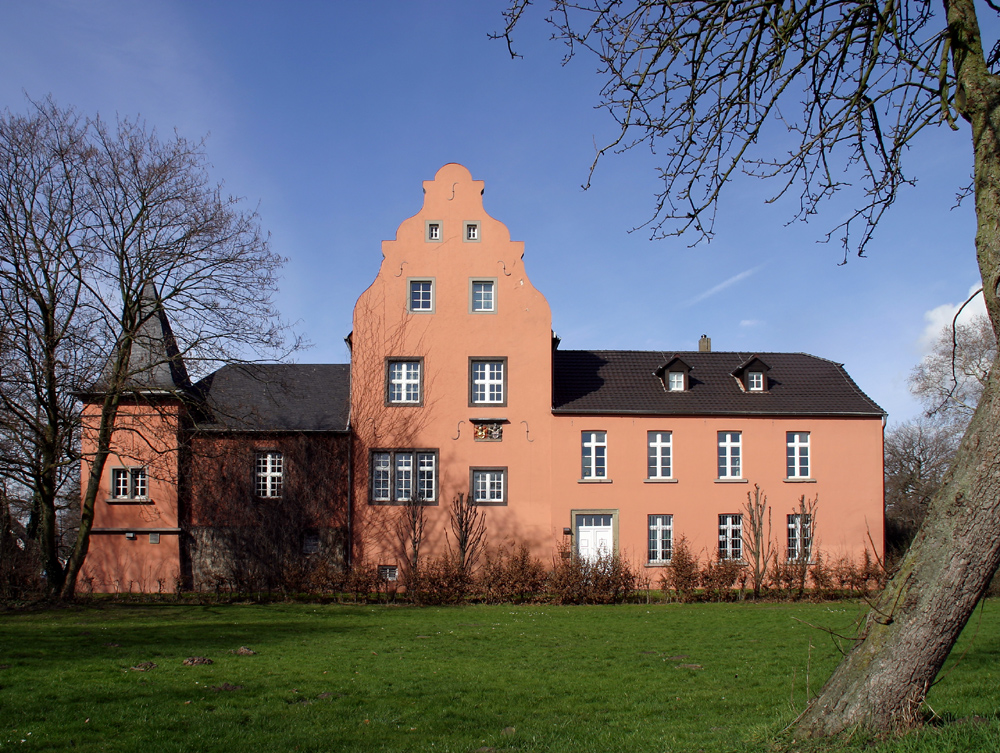
Manor house of Broich, built in 1620

Spich (German pronunciation: [ˈʃpɪç]) is one of the twelve districts (Ortschaften) of the city of Troisdorf in the Rhein-Sieg-Kreis, North Rhine-Westphalia, Germany. As of December 31, 2016, it had 12,876 inhabitants, making it the second most populous district of Troisdorf after Troisdorf-Mitte.

The main road through Spich is the Bundesstraße 8. The area also contains several industrial zones, an interchange on the Bundesautobahn 59, and a local S-Bahn stop with direct access to Cologne Bonn Airport and the ICE station in Siegburg/Bonn. The district is mainly residential, with single-family and multi-family homes. Industrial areas are located on the outskirts. The Spicher Forest contains a hazardous waste landfill. A local natural landmark is the Spicher Hohlstein.

== History ==
The noble estate known as Haus Spich was first documented in 1297. A document from Michaelsberg Abbey refers to a Mechthild de Spico. In 1555, the village belonged to the parish and jurisdiction of Sieglar in the Duchy of Berg, specifically the Amt Löwenburg.

In 1815, an alum works began operation in Spich. A fire on August 7, 1826 destroyed eight houses on Burgstraße and Brückenstraße.

The municipality of Spich was part of the mayoralty of Sieglar. In 1885, it had an area of 737 ha, including 439 ha of arable land, 14 ha of meadows, and 212 ha of forest. There were 192 households and one uninhabited building with a total population of 976 (468 men and 508 women).

Spich remained an independent municipality until April 1, 1927, when it was incorporated into Sieglar. As part of the 1969 municipal reform, Sieglar itself was incorporated into Troisdorf.

On the grounds of the Rott Manor, a station for the Prussian optical telegraph was built, later converted into a forester's lodge and now serving as a restaurant.

=== Population development ===
Year	Population
1816	610
1843	851
1871	946
1905	1,517
1914	2,095
1961	5,656
2010	12,817

== Religion ==
In the 19th century, the community was predominantly Roman Catholic (961 people), with only 3 Protestants and 12 Jews. Protestants were served by Siegburg. In 1966, the Protestant Lukas Church was initially built as a temporary structure and later expanded. A bell tower is currently planned.

Today, around 25% of residents are Protestant. The Roman Catholic community of St. Mary’s Assumption has around 5,000 members. A former Belgian military chapel at Camp Spich was consecrated in 2004 to Saint Dimitrios and now serves a Greek Orthodox community of about 1,600 members.

== Politics ==
Since the 2020 municipal elections, the SPD holds one directly elected seat, while the CDU holds three in the city council:

- District 060: Heinz-Peter Albrings (CDU)
- District 070: Nico Novacek (SPD)
- District 080: Friedhelm Hermann (CDU)
- District 090: Olaf Prinz (CDU)

The chair of the local advisory council is Nico Novacek (SPD).

== Culture and landmarks ==
=== Haus Broich ===
The knight’s estate Haus Broich was first mentioned in the 12th century. The name implies a marshy or moorland location. The manor house in Renaissance style was built in 1620.

=== Haus Spich ===
A noble estate and namesake of the town. The original buildings no longer exist, but the manor house from 1866 remains as a heritage-listed site.

=== Half-timbered houses ===
Several traditional half-timbered houses survive in Spich. Notable examples include:

- Haus Heep: A historic non-noble estate known since 1755, later rebuilt after a fire in 1999 with help from local historical societies.
- Et Hüsje: A small timber house across from Haus Heep.

=== Church of St. Mary’s Assumption ===
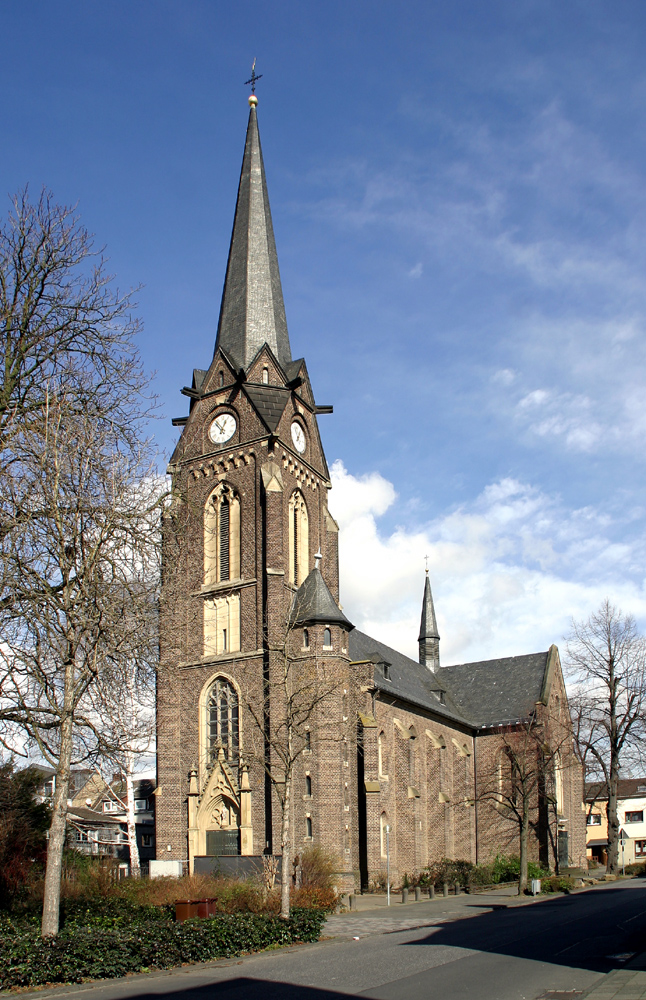
Neo-Gothic Church of St. Mary’s Assumption

The Church of the Assumption of Mary celebrated its first Mass on November 28, 1860.

== Clubs and associations ==
Notable associations in Spich include:

- 1. FC Spich (football, track club)
- Tennis clubs: TV Tie Break Troisdorf (founded 1978) and TC Spich (founded 1973)
- Cycling club: Blitz Spich 1908
- Dance troupe: Burggarde Spich e.V. and "12 Karat" (founded 1977)

The oldest club is the men’s choir MGV 1874 Spich e.V., from which the church choir St. Gregorius (1908) also originated. Other choirs include Nova Cantica and the Troisdorf Vocal Ensemble.

Spich has had a local volunteer fire brigade since February 6, 1911. A youth club (JGV Spich) was re-established in 2007. In 2009, a local organ restoration society was founded.

== Notable people ==
=== Born in Spich ===
- Gerhard Romilian von Kalcheim (1589–1644), jurist and diplomat
- Hans Willy Mertens (1866–1921), teacher and singer
- Friedrich Heuser (1890–1962), district governor
- Sven Lehmann (b. 1979), politician with Alliance 90/The Greens

=== Associated with Spich ===
- Rupert Neudeck (1939–2016), journalist and humanitarian
- Sven Steinert (b. 1983), musician

== Transport links ==
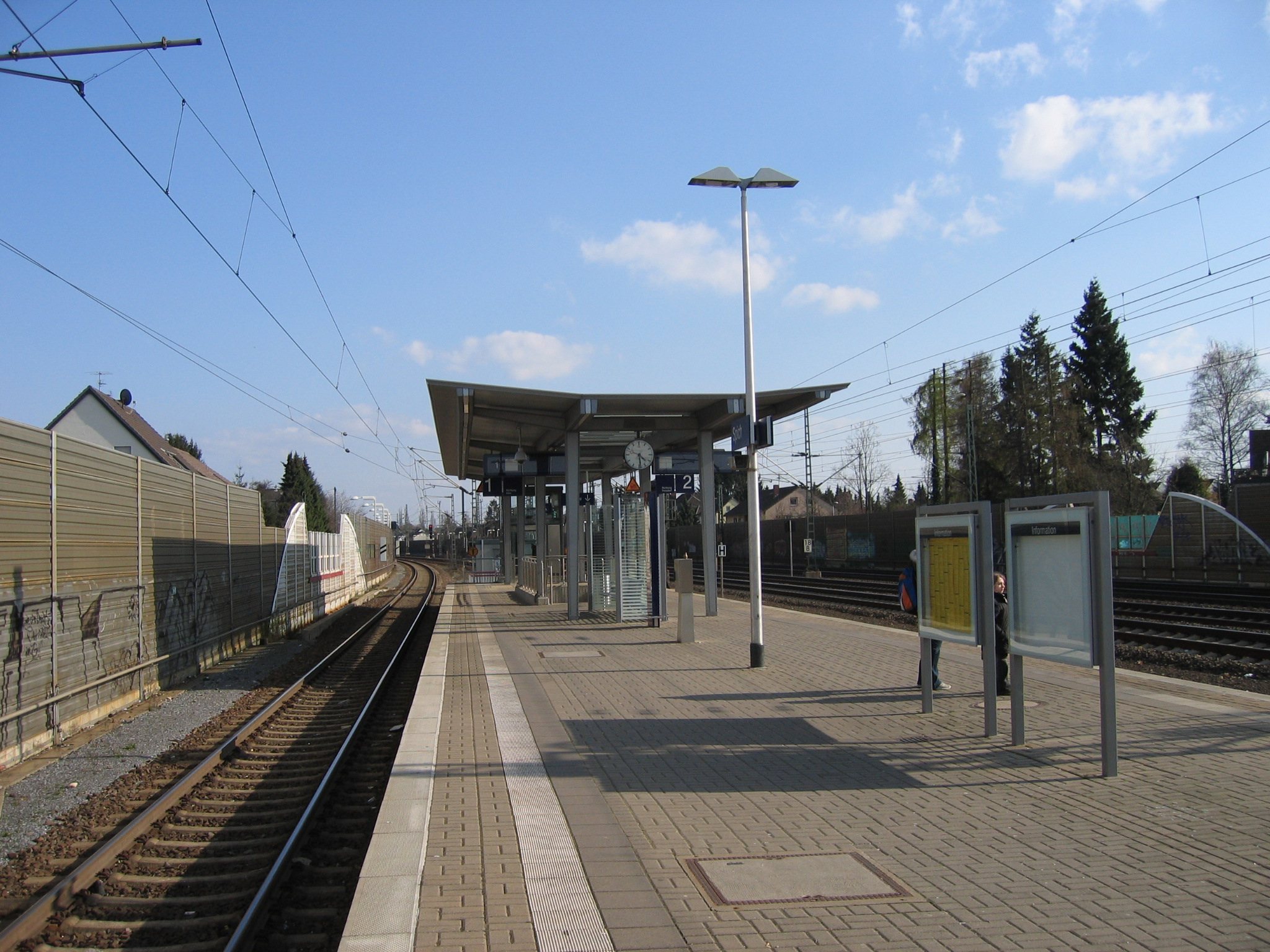
Spich station

Spich is located at the Sieg railway and served by the lines S12 and S19 of the Cologne S-Bahn, it is located in the area of the fare association Rheinland-Tarif.
