= SC1 =

SC1 or SC-1 may refer to:

- South Carolina's 1st congressional district
- USS SC-1, a United States Navy submarine chaser commissioned in 1917 and sold in 1921
- SC-01 speech synthesizer by Votrax
- SC01, a FIPS 10-4 region code, see List of FIPS region codes (S–U)
- SC-01, a subdivision code for the Seychelles, see ISO 3166-2:SC
- Small Sports Car SC01, a Chinese EV.
- Steam Controller (1st generation), gamepad by Valve Corporation

== Video games ==
- The first title in the StarCraft series.
- The first title in the SimCity series
- The first title in the Tom Clancy's Splinter Cell series

== Aircraft ==
- Signal Corps Dirigible No. 1 A 1908 Dirigible built by Thomas Scott Baldwin
- Curtiss SC-1 Seahawk, a version of the American Curtiss SC Seahawk seaplane
- Martin SC-1, a version of the American Curtiss CS reconnaissance and torpedo bomber aircraft
- Short SC.1, the first British fixed-wing vertical take-off and landing (VTOL) aircraft
- Southern Cross Aviation SC-1, an Australian civil aircraft
