= U.S. Army airships =

1908–1937 U.S. Army program to operate airships

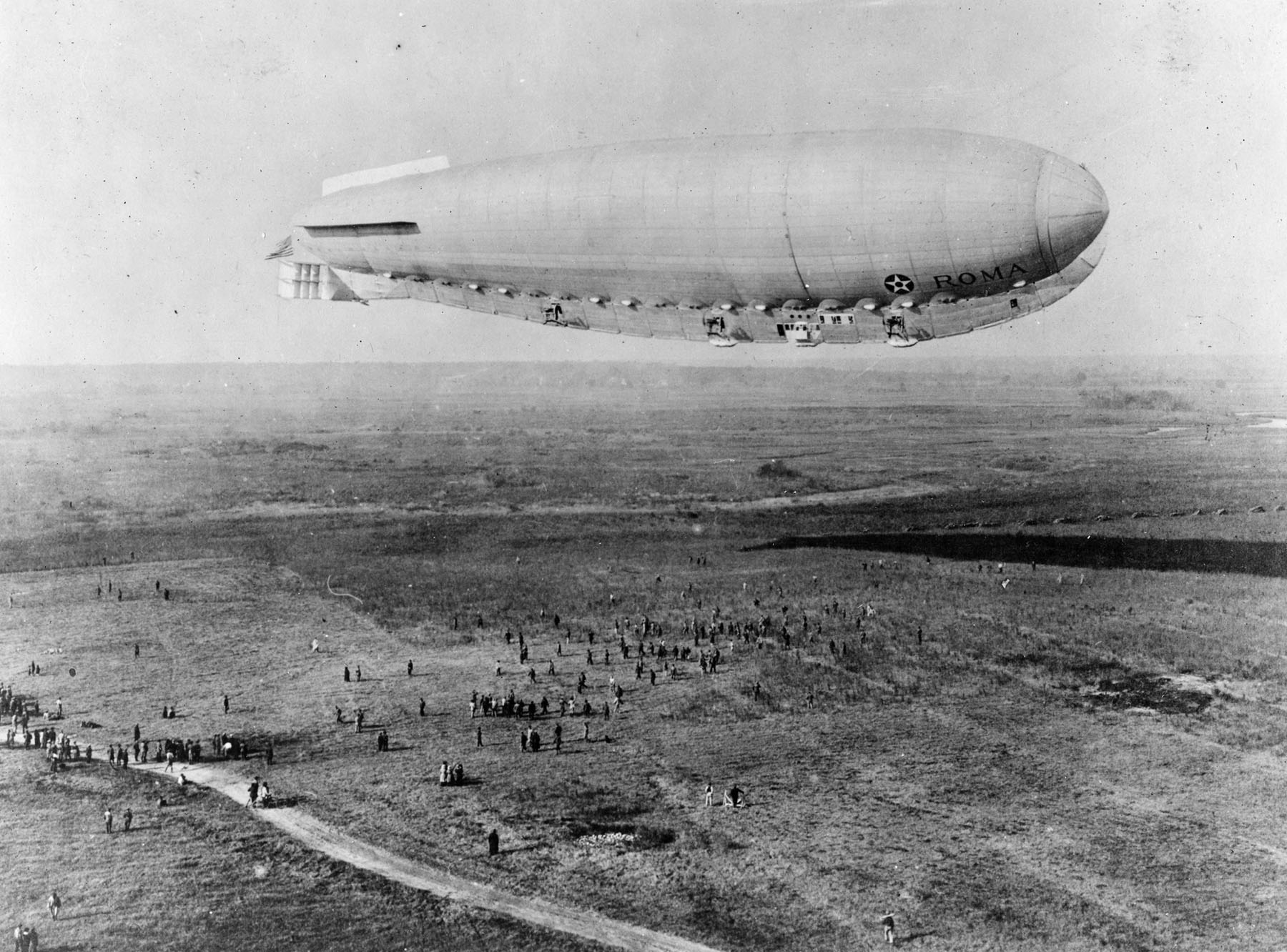
The Roma at Langley Field in 1921

Beginning in 1908 and ending in 1937, the U.S. Army established a program to operate airships. With the exceptions of the Italian-built Roma and the Goodyear RS-1, which were both semi-rigid, all Army airships were non-rigid blimps. These airships were used primarily for search and patrol operations in support of coastal fortifications and border patrol. During the 1920s, the Army operated many more blimps than the U.S. Navy. Blimps were selected by the Army because they were not seen as "threats" on the battlefield by opposing forces, unlike airplanes, due to their passive role in combat.

== History ==
The history of American military aviation began during the Civil War, when the Union Army operated observation balloons. Later, a balloon was used by the U.S. Army in Cuba during the Spanish–American War. These were ad hoc and not part of an established branch of the Army. The use of observation balloons continued after the end of World War I. The last use of observation balloons by the Army was during maneuvers conducted in Louisiana during September 1941. Balloons must either be tethered, or go where they are blown by the wind, but towards the end of the nineteenth century powered airships, capable of being directed at the will of the pilot, were developed.

In 1908, the U.S. Army experimented with its first powered aircraft, the SC-1, or Signal Corps number 1. It was a small non-rigid airship with a top speed under 20 mph and an endurance of just over 2 hours. Following tests at Fort Myer, the SC-1 was sent to Fort Omaha, Nebraska, where the Signal Corps School was located. While the SC-1 was being tested at Fort Myer, the Signal Corps had built an airship hangar and a plant to produce hydrogen gas at Fort Omaha. Fort Omaha became, for a while, the first permanent military airfield in the United States. The SC-1 was scrapped in 1912, and the base at Fort Omaha closed in 1913.

=== World War I ===
The U.S. Army operated French observation balloons during World War I, but did not operate another airship until after the war ended. During World War I the Joint Airship Board assigned the U.S. Navy the role of acquiring and developing rigid airships. This did not dissuade the Army from pursuing its own course. Colonel William Hensley flew as an observer on the return voyage of the British R34 airship from Long Island, New York to the UK in the summer of 1919. Hensley was then sent on a confidential mission to contact the Zeppelin Company to attempt to purchase the remaining undelivered wartime Zeppelin, the L 72. The scheme probably originated with General "Billy" Mitchell. Hensley visited the Zeppelin plant, inspected L 72 and flew on the Bodensee, a small passenger Zeppelin. The Inter-Allied Commission of Control ordered that L 72 should be turned over to France. In November 1919 the U.S. Army contracted with the Zeppelin corporation for construction of the LZ 125, which was to be larger than the R38 class airship which the USN had contracted to purchase from Britain as the ZR-2. This attempt to avoid the conditions set by the Joint Airship Board would have encountered legal problems as the US Senate refused to ratify the Allied Peace Treaty with Germany until October 1921. Complaints by the Secretary of the Navy resulted in the Secretary of War ordering the German contract terminated in December 1919.

=== Interwar years ===
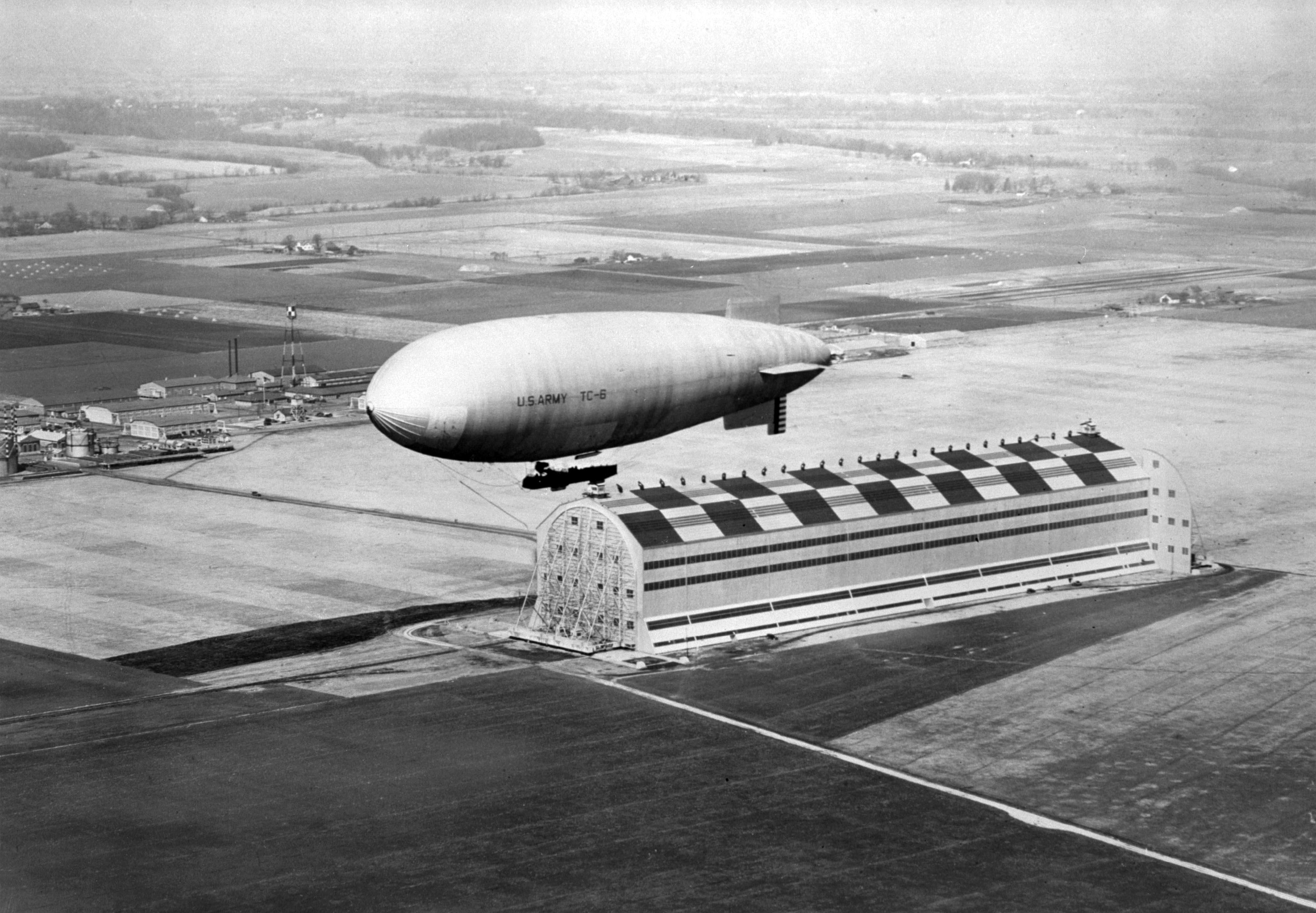
TC-6 in 1925

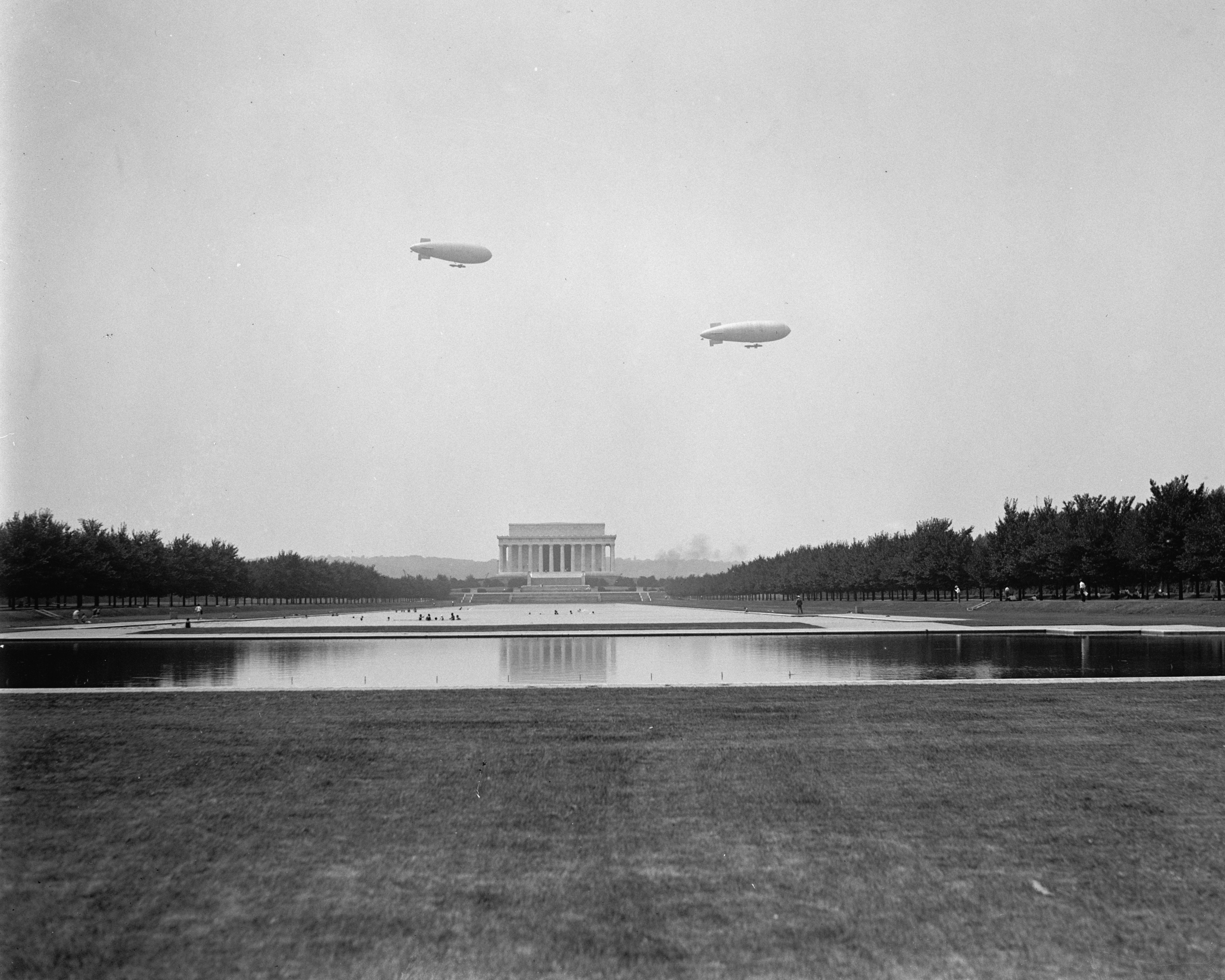
TC-5 and TC-9 fly past the Lincoln Memorial in 1926

Following the end of World War I, the U.S. Army acquired a variety of blimps from US, French and British sources. Plans were made for operating airships from both Fort Bliss and Brooks Field, in Texas and Langley Field, Virginia. The first blimp operated by the Army was the A-4, which was operated primarily from Langley until transferred to the new Balloon and Airship School at Scott Field, Illinois. The Army operated several Navy C class blimps and D class blimps during the immediate post-World War I era.

Army blimps participated in the "Mitchell" bombing test in 1921. They were used for training, coastal patrol, and experimentation in the early 1920s. The Army purchased three British SST class blimps from the British, which were operated out of Biggs Field, Fort Bliss, and Brooks Field, both in Texas for purposes of border patrol between 1920 and 1923.

During the 1920s the Army developed several "Motorized Observation Balloons". The OB-1 and MB were intended to fly to where needed, and then be tethered as observation balloons.

The U.S. Army acquired the Italian semi-rigid airship Roma in 1921. The Roma was the largest airship ever operated by the Army and was based at Langley Field. With a cruising speed of 50 mph and a range of 7,000 miles, the Roma allowed the Army to consider transcontinental deployments, missions to Panama, the fast transport of cargo and passengers, and long-range sea patrols. The Roma crashed into high-tension wires and was destroyed by fire near Norfolk, Virginia on 21 February 1922. The Roma tragedy led Congress to decree that all future U.S. airships would use non-flammable helium instead of hydrogen as the lifting gas.

During the 1920s and 1930s, the U.S. Army Airship Service was responsible for improvements in airship operation construction. These included the use of internal gondola suspension and the only advanced semi-rigid airship manufactured in America, the RS-1, built by Goodyear. The army operated the RS-1 during the late 1920s until the requirement for a new envelope grounded the ship and resulted in it being scrapped in 1930. The Airship Service also supplied airship pilots and logistic support for stratospheric research flights.

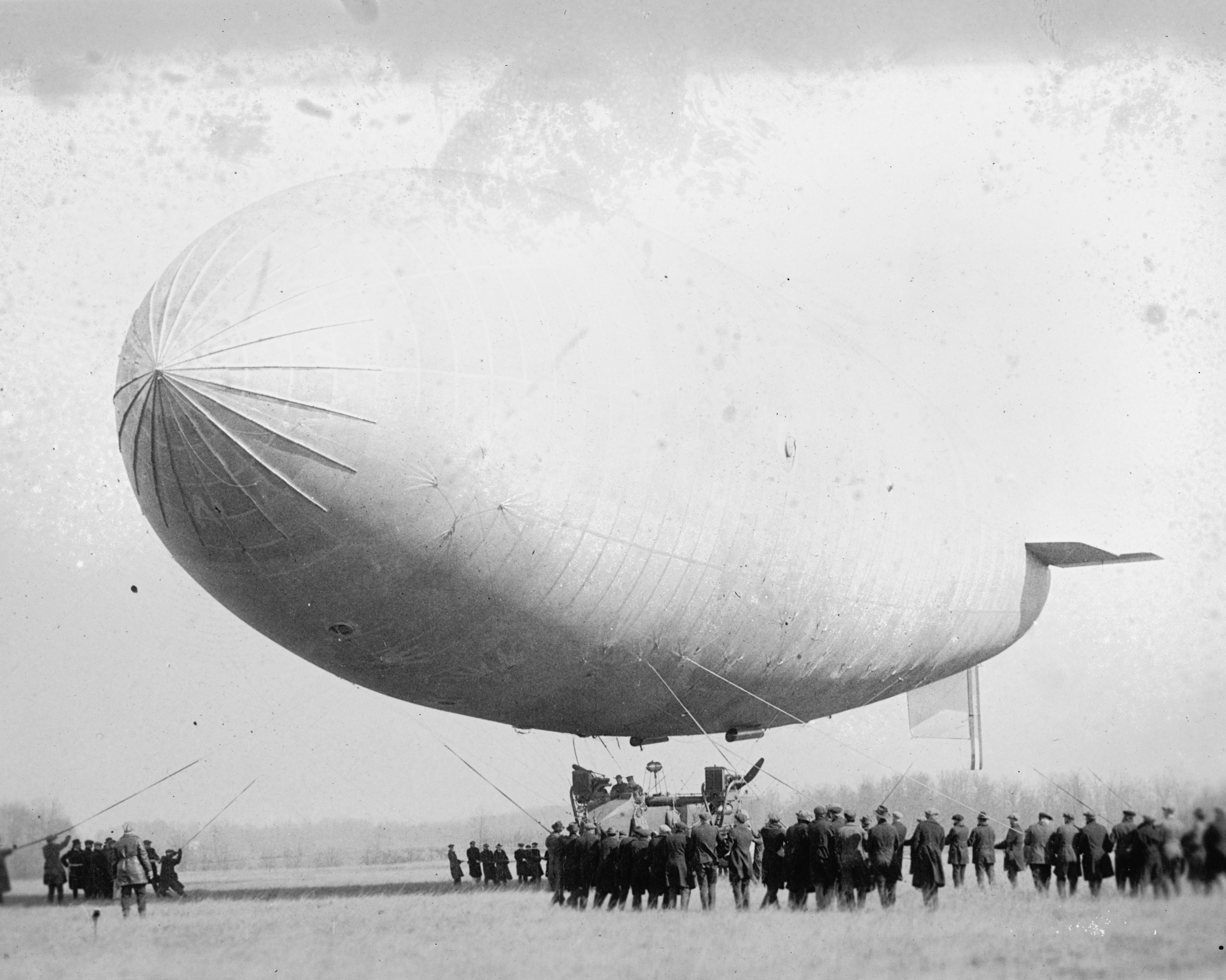
"TC" Class Army airship on 28 March 1923

The majority of the airships operated by the U.S. Army during the 1920s and 1930s were of the "TC" Class, designed for coastal patrol duty, because the U.S. Army had long held the primary responsibility for coastal and harbor defense of the US. The airship was seen as capable of searching for hostile ships and tracking those ships until they could be engaged by coastal defenses or Army bombers. One TC class blimp, the C-41, was often used for various public relation experiments in the 1930s, including landing on the Washington D.C. mall to lay a wreath at the Lincoln Memorial and experimented with picking up mail from a moving train.

Amongst the most interesting U.S. Army Airship Service experiments was to pursue the ability to operate airplanes from airships. While both the Germans and British had experimented with releasing fighters from rigid airships, it was the U.S. Army that first flew an airplane from the ground and 'hooked' on to a trapeze suspended from an airship. Many tests involving a Sperry Messenger airplane and TC-3, a TC class blimp, were made in the mid-1920s. Eventually, the technology was assumed by the U.S. Navy on the "flying aircraft carriers", USS Akron (ZRS-4) and USS Macon (ZRS-5).

The U.S. Army continued to show interest in the acquisition and operation of rigid airships well into the 1930s. The Army Airship Service developed new designs, and operated a number of blimps, primarily from Scott Field and Langley Field through the early 1930s when competition for funding from the rapidly growing Air Corps started its decline. In 1932, the Army contracted for two blimps significantly more capable than any in service, these were the TC-13 and TC-14. When Army Airship operations were terminated in 1937, a number of Army blimps were transferred to the U.S. Navy, but only two, the TC-13 and 14 were ever operated by the Navy.

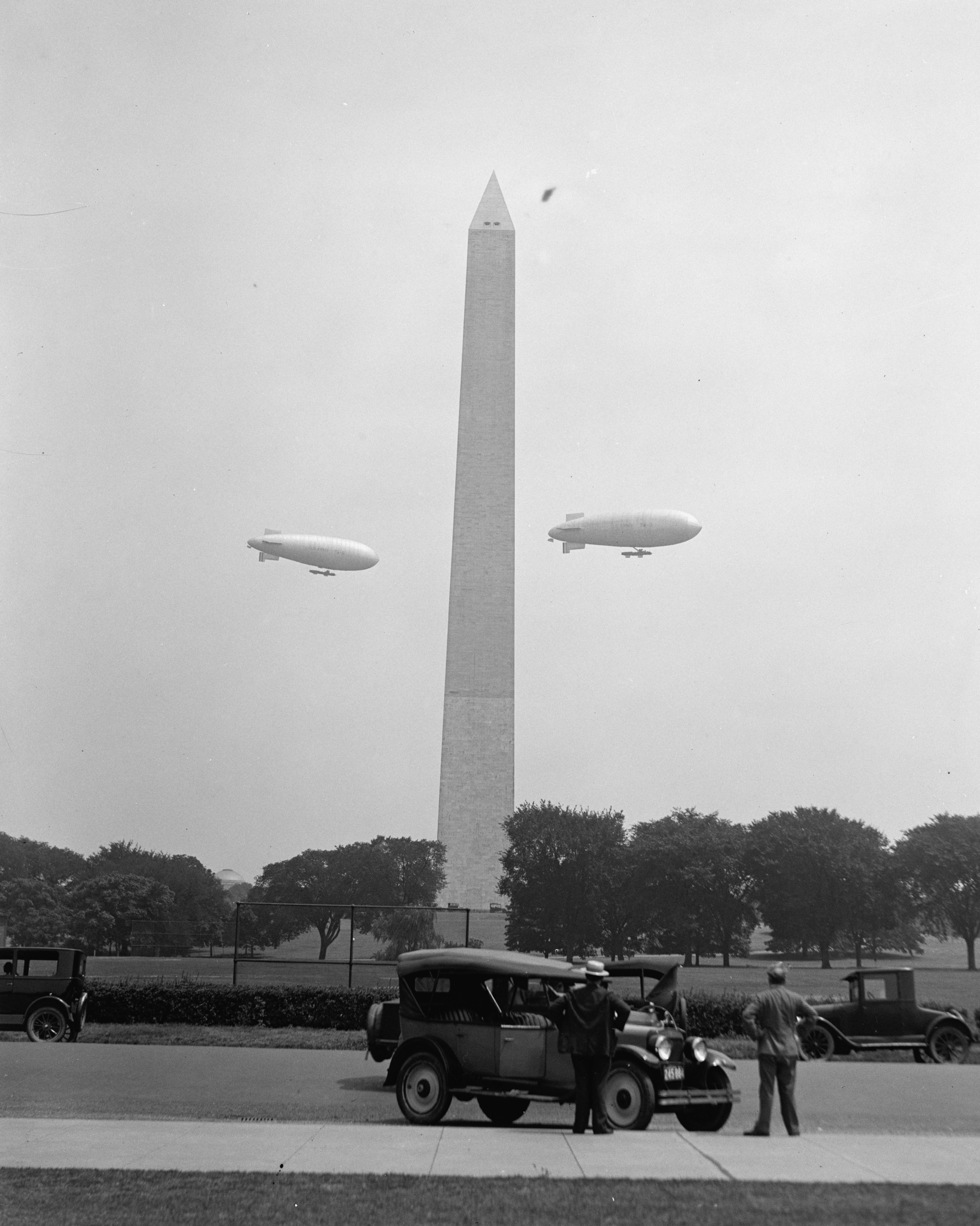
Washington Monument and two U. S. Army airships- TC 9 and TC 5 on 11 August 1926

Unlike the Navy, the Army had failed during the post-World War I era to establish a definite mission, much less a comprehensive plan for accomplishing that mission, for its airships. By 1935, Congress was considering the elimination of funding for the Army airship program, and Chief of the Air Corps Major General Benjamin Foulois, who himself had been a pilot of the SC-1, was recommending the program be terminated. In mid-1937, the US Army's airship operations were officially ended.

=== World War II ===
As Congress refused to authorize further expenditures for Army airships but did allow funding of observation balloons, the army resurrected the "Motorized Observation Balloon" concept abandoned in the 1920s. The "Motorized Observation Balloon" continued in use for several more years. There were even new 'pony blimps' constructed. These were the five C-6, seven C-8 and four C-9 class airships. Two of the TE-3 class were re-designated C-7s. The last US Army airships were the two C-7s which were transferred to the Navy in 1943.

=== Post - World War II ===
Following World War II, the War Assets Administration put up for sale sixteen Motorized Observation Balloons of the C-6, 8 & 9 classes. One was briefly operated by the Douglas Leigh Sky Advertising Company between 1948 and 1950, the C-6-36-11 made its last flight on 14 June 1950.

== See also ==
- Long Endurance Multi-intelligence Vehicle
- High-altitude airship
- List of American Balloon Squadrons
- Explorer II, 1930s manned U.S. Army high-altitude balloon
