= Baldwin Red Devil =

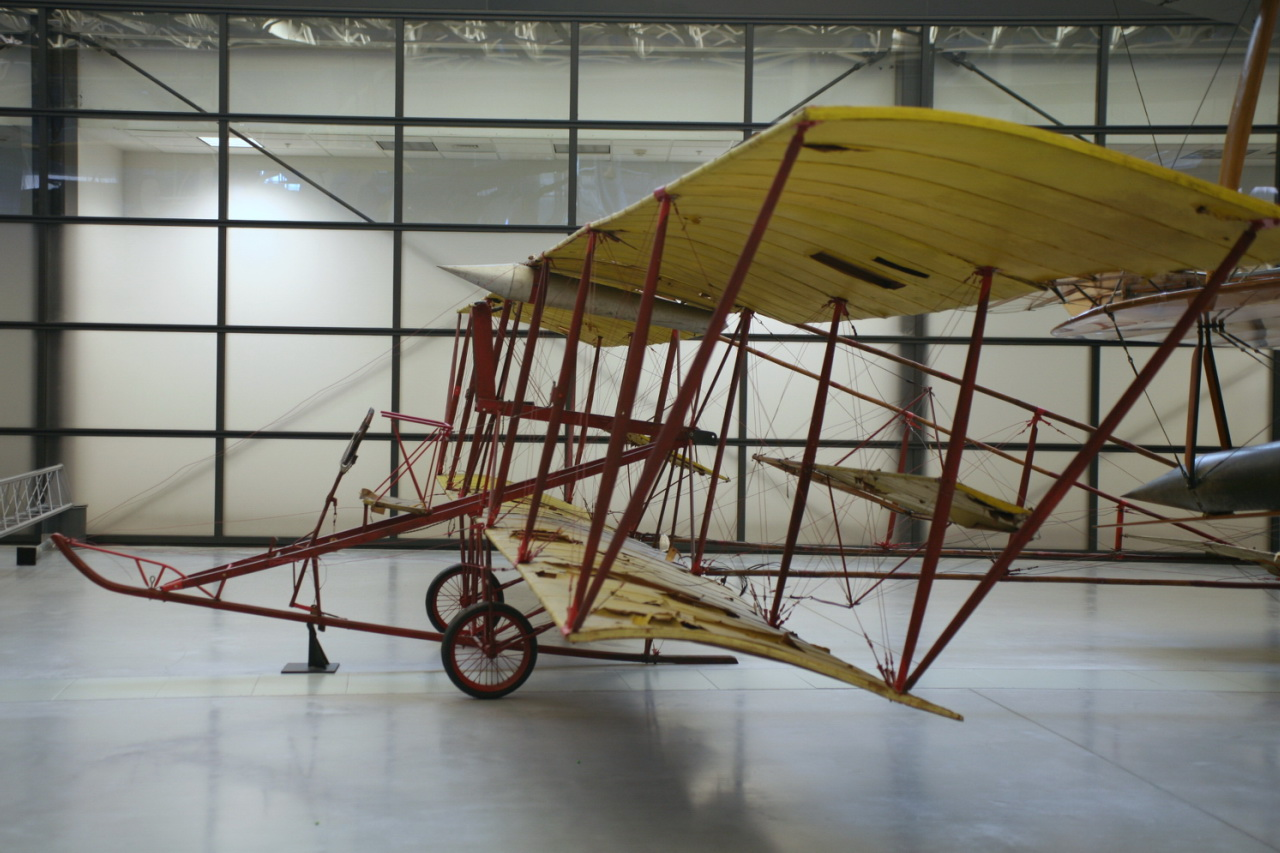
- Baldwin's Red Devil, located at the Steven F. Udvar-Hazy Center

General information
- National origin: United States of America
- Manufacturer: Thomas Scott Baldwin (later Wittemann-Lewis)
- Designer: Thomas Scott Baldwin
- Number built: 6

History
- Introduction date: 1911
- First flight: 1911

The Baldwin Red Devil is a series of early pusher configuration aircraft employing steel tube construction. The aircraft were designed by Thomas Scott Baldwin.

== Development ==
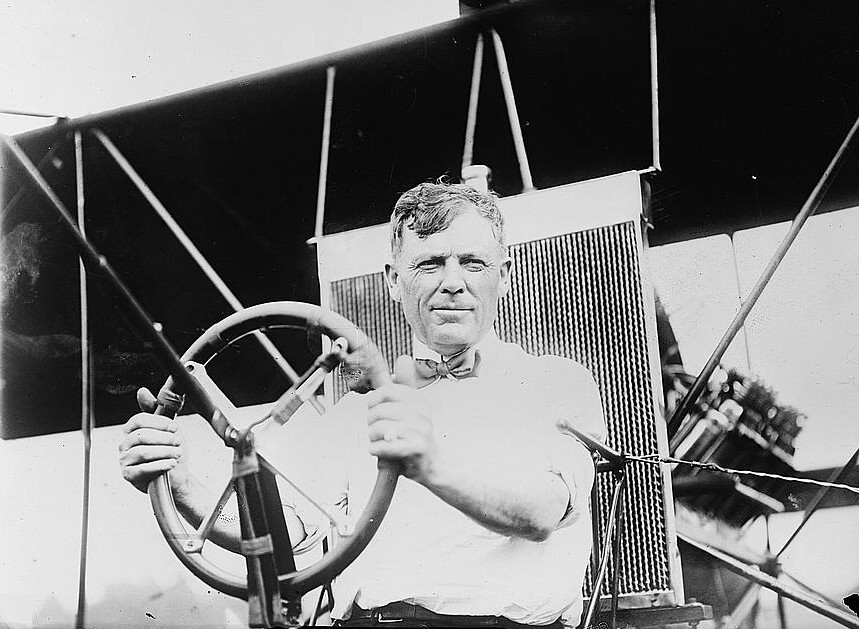
Baldwin at the wheel of the Red Devil

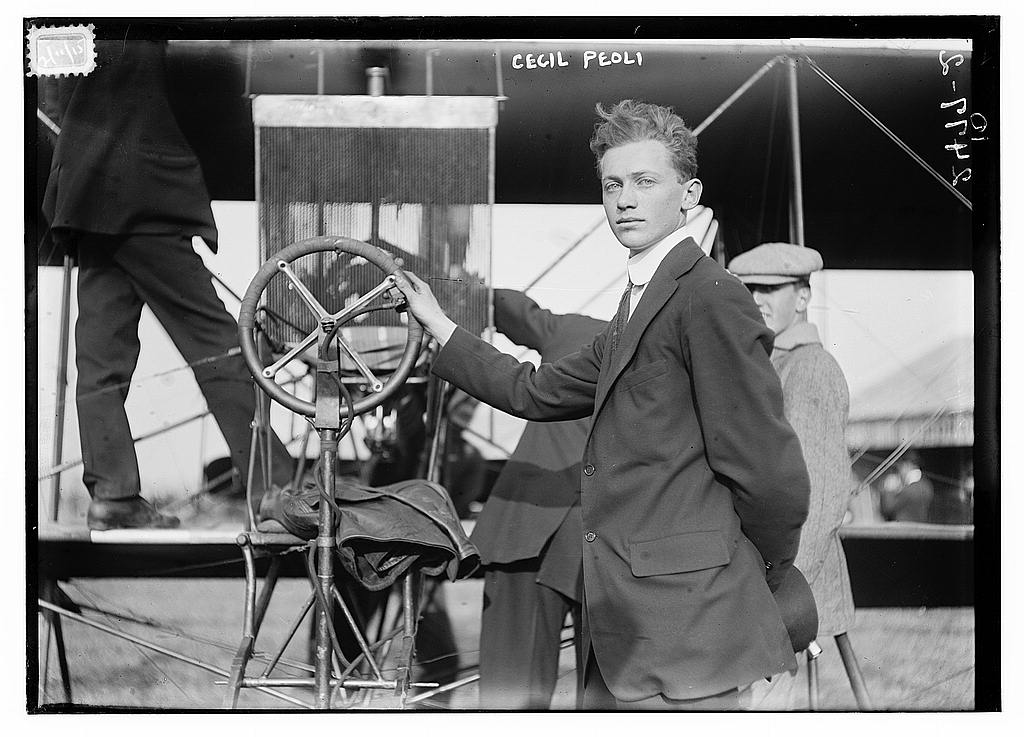
Cecil Peoli circa 1915 in front of a Red Devil

After building several aircraft, Baldwin had C. and A. Wittemann of Staten Island, New York build an aircraft similar to the basic Curtiss Pusher. The aircraft used fabric covered steel tubing instead of wood construction. A 60 horsepower (45 kW), Hall-Scott V-8 provided enough power for 60 mph (97 km/h) flights. The aircraft was named "Red Devil III", and subsequent designs would be named "Baldwin Red Devil". Each of the Red Devil's tubing were painted a bright red, with yellow contrasting wings.

== Design ==
The airplane was powered by water cooled Hall-Scott V-8 engine of 60 hp (45 kW), The aircraft was covered with vulcanized fabric that was tacked to the ribs rather than rib-stitched. The landing gear was made from steel tubes with hickory wood inserts. Control cables were routed through copper tubing. It had a left foot controlled throttle and a right foot controlled magneto kill switch.

== Operational history ==
The "Red Devil III" was test flown by Baldwin over Mineola Field. The first flight resulted in a wreck into a telegraph pole, with no major injuries. The Baldwin School offered flying lessons in the aircraft for $500 (1911 dollars), if the student proved they had life insurance for flight. It was the student's responsibility to also find an insurance broker to provide the policy, because there were no flight training policies available at that time. Baldwin previously had toured the country in Curtiss aircraft and his own designs. By the time he had produced the "Red Devil", he had more bookings than he could handle; the "Red Devil" would be advertised in several towns in close proximity, then substitute pilots and aircraft would be flown with full crowds of spectators. In one display in St. Louis he flew the "Red Devil" under the Eads and McKinley Bridges in St.Louis. On October 12, 1913, Tony Jannus flew actress Julia Bruns in a Red Devil in a New York Times Derby.

== Variants ==
A Red Devil is on display at the Smithsonian Institution's Udvar-Hazy Center (UHC) of the National Air and Space Museum. This example has a different configuration without a forward mounted elevator. The aircraft was purchased in 1950 from an established display at Roosevelt Field, in Mineola, Long Island, New York by Paul E. Garber along with a Bleriot XI, and Nieuport 10 for $2500.

== Specifications (Baldwin Red Devil) ==
Data from Smithsonian

General characteristics

- Length: 30 ft (9.1 m)
- Wingspan: 42 ft (13 m)
- Height: 8 ft (2.4 m)
- Empty weight: 750 lb (340 kg)
- Powerplant: 1 × Hall-Scott V-8 , 60 hp (45 kW)
- Propellers: single blade Gibson, 7 ft (2.1 m) diameter

Performance

== See also ==
Thomas Scott Baldwin#Red Devil
