= George G. Lundberg =

United States Air Force general

- Born: George Godfrey Lundberg; October 19, 1892
- Died: January 1981 (aged 88)
- Occupation: Pilot in the United States Air Force

Brigadier General George Godfrey Lundberg (October 19, 1892 – January 1981) was a pilot in the United States Air Force.

== Education and early career ==
After graduating from the University of Pennsylvania's Economics program in 1917, Lundberg was made a Second Lieutenant in the Balloon Corps the following year while stationed at Fort Omaha, Nebraska. By 1936, he had been made a Captain.

== Career ==
Lundberg later served as a Major at the Middletown Air Technical Service Command in Pennsylvania where he was eventually named commander. He was moved to Eighth Air Force in England during the Second World War. He became known as the "chief airman" to Major General Edwin Forrest Harding of the 32nd Infantry Division, and offered a commendation to Harding's son.

In February 1945, he was given command of Antilles Air Command in San Juan, Puerto Rico as a Colonel. On April 7, 1947, he was named Base Commander of Norton Air Force Base in San Bernardino, California. He served as commander of the Pacific Overseas Air Material District until his retirement in 1949.

== Retirement ==
Following his retirement, he moved to Olean, New York and was appointed "Civilian Defense Chief" of the city the following year, and oversaw the city's celebration of Armed Forces Day.
