= RS1 =

RS1 or RS-1 may refer to:

- ALCO RS-1, a 4-axle diesel-electric locomotive built by Alco-GE and later by Alco alone
- K-5 (missile), also known as RS-1U or product ShM, an early Soviet air-to-air missile
- The Reid and Sigrist R.S.1, a British twin-engined, three-seat advanced trainer developed during World War II
- Retinoschisin, a protein that in humans is encoded by the RS1 gene
- Ross RS-1 Zanonia, a single seat, gull-winged glider
- Rohini Satellite 1, an Indian satellite in the Rohini satellite series
- (7080) 1986 RS1, generally written as (7080) 1986 RS_{1}, a main-belt minor planet
- Sikorsky S-41, an amphibious flying boat airliner designated by the U.S. Navy as RS-1
- Stadler Regio-Shuttle RS1, a diesel railcar manufactured by Stadler Rail AG
- Goodyear RS-1 America's first semi-rigid airship
- RS/1, statistical software from Bolt, Beranek and Newman
- The first Randall–Sundrum model
- Long Wall RS1, a liquid-fuelled small-lift launch vehicle
- RS1, a type of resistant starch
