= General Crook House =

Historic house in Nebraska, United States

- Gen. George Crook House
- U.S. National Register of Historic Places
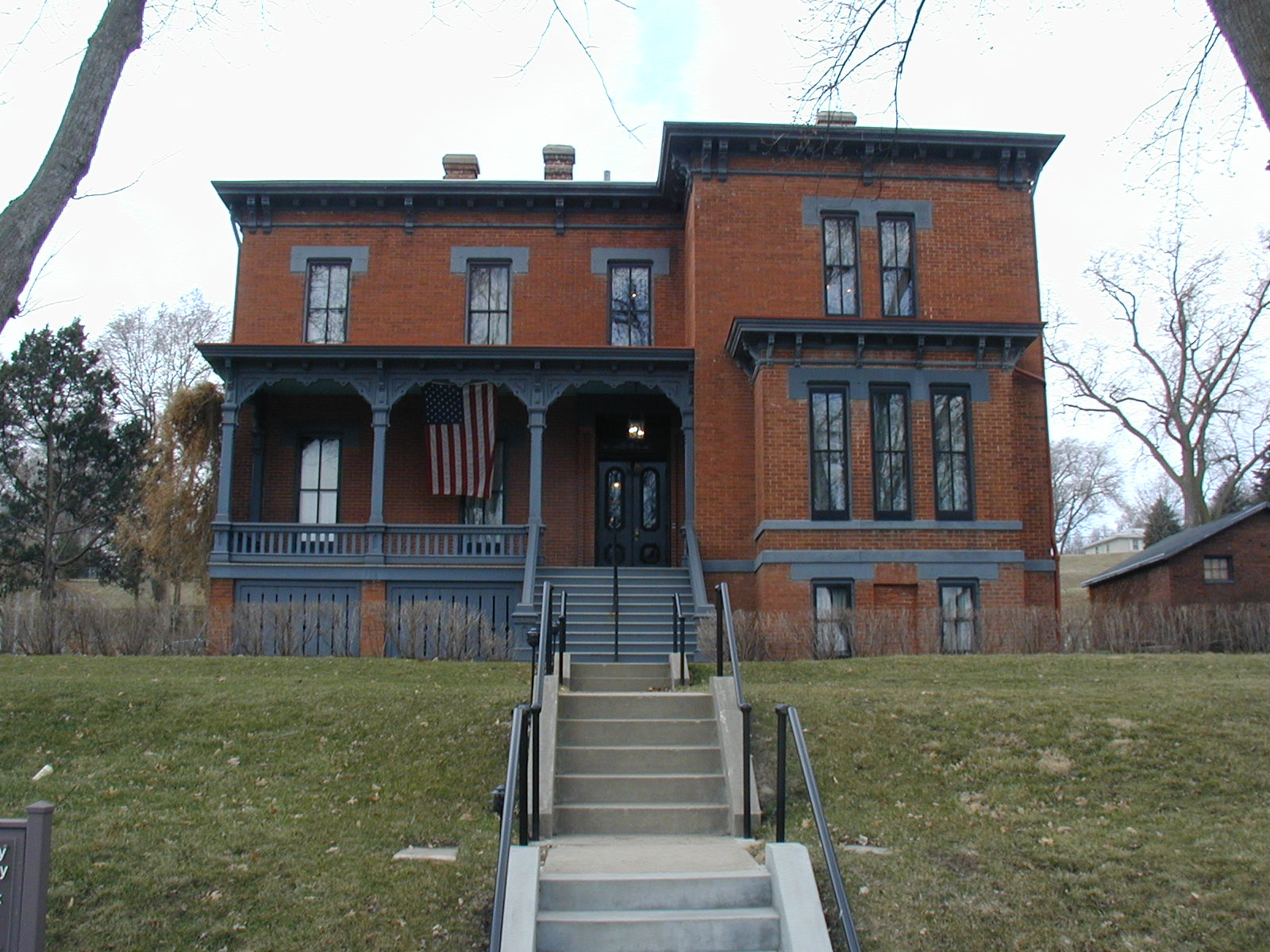
- Location: 5730 North 30th Street, Omaha, Nebraska
- Coordinates: 41.31022669034143°N 95.96038505442354°W
- Built: 1879
- Architectural style: Italianate
- NRHP reference No.: 69000131
- Added to NRHP: October 15, 1969

The General George Crook House Museum is located in Fort Omaha. The Fort is located in the Miller Park neighborhood of North Omaha, Nebraska, United States. The house was listed on the National Register of Historic Places in 1969, and is a contributing property to the Fort Omaha Historic District.

== History ==
In 1878, General George Crook moved headquarters for the Department of the Platte from downtown Omaha to Fort Omaha. The General Crook home was built in 1879 to be the residence of the commander. Constructed in an Italianate design, the building consists of two stories with a grand garden surrounding it. Crowned by hipped roofs, the building is asymmetrical in plan and is in good condition. A long one-story porch projects from its eastern facade.

General George Crook was the only commander to occupy the home, as the department was disbanded after his tenure. In November, 1879, Crook and his wife entertained General and Mrs. Ulysses S. Grant at the home. In September 1880, President Rutherford B. Hayes stayed there while he was reviewing the troops at the Fort.

After Crook left Fort Omaha, the house served as a home to each of the subsequent commanders of the Fort. In 1905, the house was used as an officer's club and mess hall. In 1930, it was converted back to a post commander's residence, serving until the Fort was closed in 1973.

The Crook House is the oldest structure built as a private residence in Omaha.

The building was named a Nebraska State Historical Site in 1970.

== Currently ==
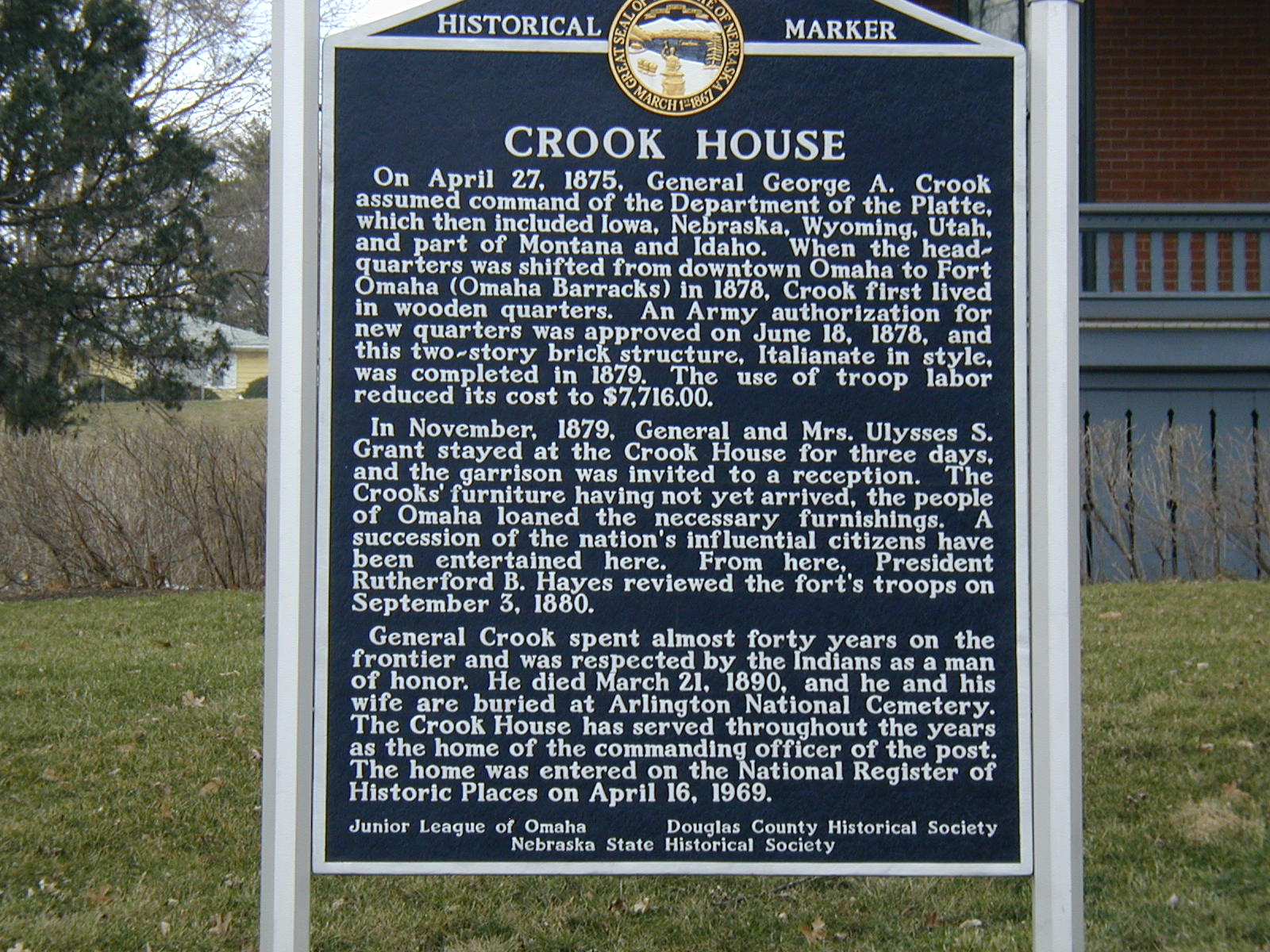
Nebraska State Historical Marker for the General Crook House

The Douglas County Historical Society restored the house in the 1980s, refurbishing it with period furniture and restoring its heirloom Victorian gardens. Today, it is open to the public for tours and for special events.

== See also ==
- History of Omaha
- Landmarks in Omaha, Nebraska
