= Peoli =

Peoli may refer to:

- Cecil Peoli (1894–1915), American aviator
- Isidoro Malmierca Peoli (1930–2001), Cuban foreign minister and co-founder of the Cuban Communist Party
- Juan Jorge Peoli (1825–1893), American painter; grandfather of Cecil Peoli
- Peoli, Ohio, a town in Ohio, United States
