= The Girl in the Limousine (play) =

Play by Wilson Collison and Avery Hopwood

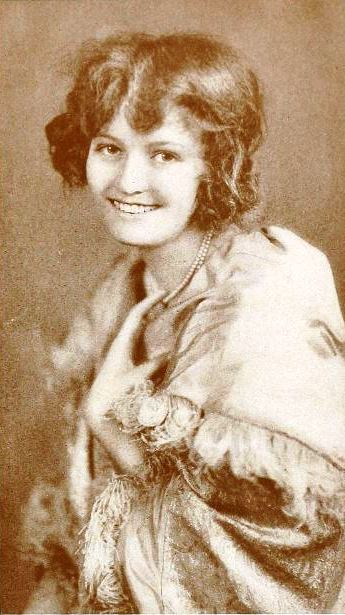
- Doris Kenyon as Betty Neville
- Original language: English
- Written by: Wilson Collison, Avery Hopwood
- Genre: Farce
- Setting: An apartment bedroom

Premiere
- Date: October 6, 1919
- Place: Eltinge 42nd Street Theatre

The Girl in the Limousine is a play written by Wilson Collison and Avery Hopwood. The story is a bedroom farce about a man who accidentally finds himself undressed in the bedroom of his ex-girlfriend. Producer A. H. Woods staged it on Broadway in 1919. The production was a success, closing at the end of January 1920 after 137 performances. The play was adapted into a movie in 1924.

== Plot ==
Tony Hamilton is on his way to a party at the home of his former girlfriend Betty and her new husband Freddie Neville. He is waylaid by thieves who take most of his clothes and dump him into a dark room of a nearby apartment. This room turns out to be Betty Neville's bedroom. Betty has been feeling ill and has retired from the party to sleep. Various complications ensue as Tony attempts to conceal or explain his near-naked presence in Betty's bedroom. First Betty's aunt Cicely shows up. She has never met Betty's new husband, and finding Tony in the bedroom, she assumes he must be Freddie. The real Freddie makes his way to the bedroom later, as do several of the party guests.

== Cast and characters ==
Cast of the Broadway production
Character	Broadway cast
Kargan	Edward Butler
Giles	Harry Charles
Tony Hamilton	John Cumberland
Lucia Galen	Claiborne Foster
Betty Neville	Doris Kenyon
Benny	Dann Malloy
Riggs	Barnett Parker
Dr. Jimmie Galen	Charles Ruggles
Bernice Warren	Vivian Rushmore
Aunt Cicely	Zelda Sears
Freddie Neville	Frank Thomas

== History ==
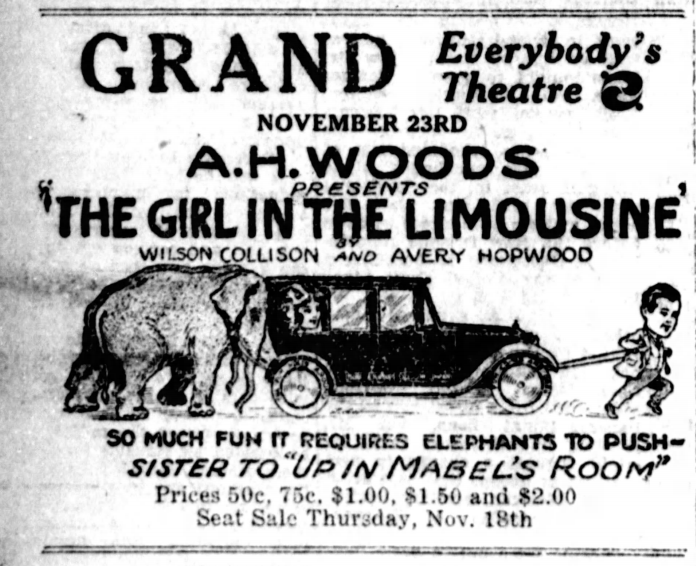
Advertisement for the play in The Jacksonville Daily Journal, February 2, 1921

Wilson Collison wrote the initial version of the play and offered it to producer Al Woods, who had previously produced Up in Mabel's Room, a play Collison co-wrote with Otto Hauerbach. Woods gave it to Avery Hopwood for revisions. The play was initially titled Betty's Bed, but was changed for production to The Girl in the Limousine, despite the fact that no female character is in a limousine at any time during the story.

The play's Broadway opening was at the Eltinge 42nd Street Theatre on October 6, 1919. John Cumberland and Doris Kenyon starred as Tony and Betty. It ran on Broadway until January 31, 1920, with 137 performances. The play subsequently went on tour, appearing in cities such as Kansas City, Chicago, Philadelphia, Pittsburgh, and San Francisco with John Arthur and Nancy Fair leading the cast.

== Reception ==
The Brooklyn Daily Eagle said the play "lost its humor in plain coarseness and indecency" and claimed it "exhausts the possibilities for vulgarity". The New York Tribune said it used "familiar formulae" and had only one good joke. In The Evening World, Charles Darnton called it "mechanical" and said audiences would be bored rather than shocked. Dorothy Parker, writing in Vanity Fair, found it "undeniably very funny". George Jean Nathan for the literary magazine The Smart Set wrote: "Avery Hopwood..., it begins to look, is selling his artistic soul to the highest bidder".

== Adaptations ==
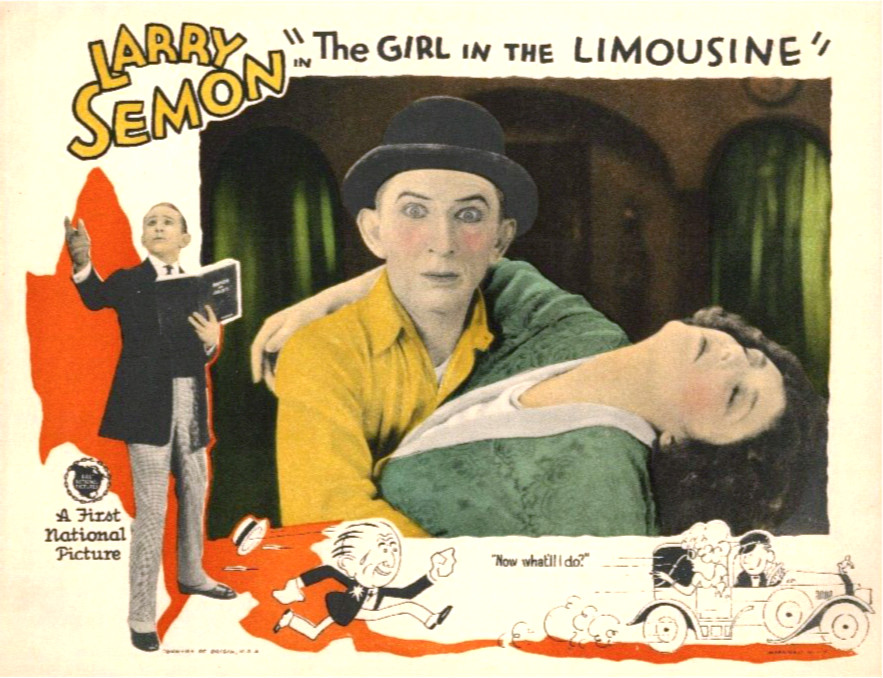
Lobby card for the film adaptation

Chadwick Pictures produced a silent film adaptation of the play, also titled The Girl in the Limousine, in 1924. Larry Semon and Claire Adams starred as Tony and his ex-girlfriend; Oliver Hardy played Freddie. Semon co-directed with Noel M. Smith. The movie is considered a lost film.
