= Vivian Rushmore =

American actress

Vivian Rushmore was an American actress who had leading roles in several Broadway productions. She was cast in Charles Klein's 1914 production The Money Makers. She played a fairy godmother in the 1912 Cinderella themed production The Lady Slipper. She played a screenwriter in The Squab Farm (1918). She portrayed Bernice Warren in The Girl in the Limousine (play) (1919).

Munsey's Magazine ran a portrait of her in 1914. In 1921, Theatre Magazine included an image of her wearing a white chiffon outfit in character as part of a spread on fashion in opera.

== Theater ==
- Belle of Mayfair (1907), as debutante
- The Lady Slipper (1912), as Fairy Godmother
- The Money Makers (1914)
- Fast and Grow Fat (1917), an adaptation of the story "Five Fridays", opposite Roy Atwell
- The Squab Farm (1918). portraying a screenwriter
- The Girl in the Limousine (1919), as Bernice Warren
