= Douglas County Historical Society =

The Douglas County Historical Society, or DCHS, is located at 5730 North 30th Street in the General Crook House at Fort Omaha in north Omaha, Nebraska. Douglas County Historical Society collects, preserves, and make accessible the history of Douglas County, Nebraska through exhibits, programs, and research.

== General Crook House Museum ==
The DCHS operates the General Crook House Museum and the Crook House Victorian Heirloom Garden.

== See also ==
- History of Omaha
- History of Nebraska
