= Julia Bruns =

American stage and silent film actress and model

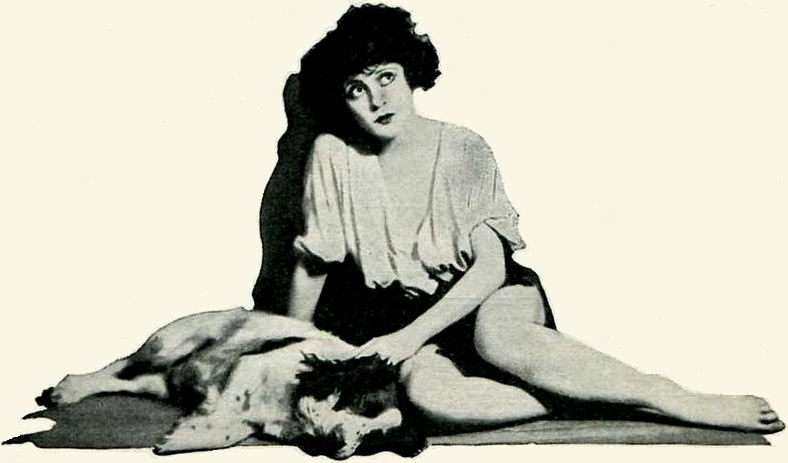
- Bruns in Beware of Dogs
- Born: Julia Eliza Bruns; 1895; St. Louis, Missouri, U.S.
- Died: December 24, 1927 (aged 32); New York City, U.S.
- Resting place: Bellefontaine Cemetery
- Occupations: Actress, model
- Years active: 1913–1921

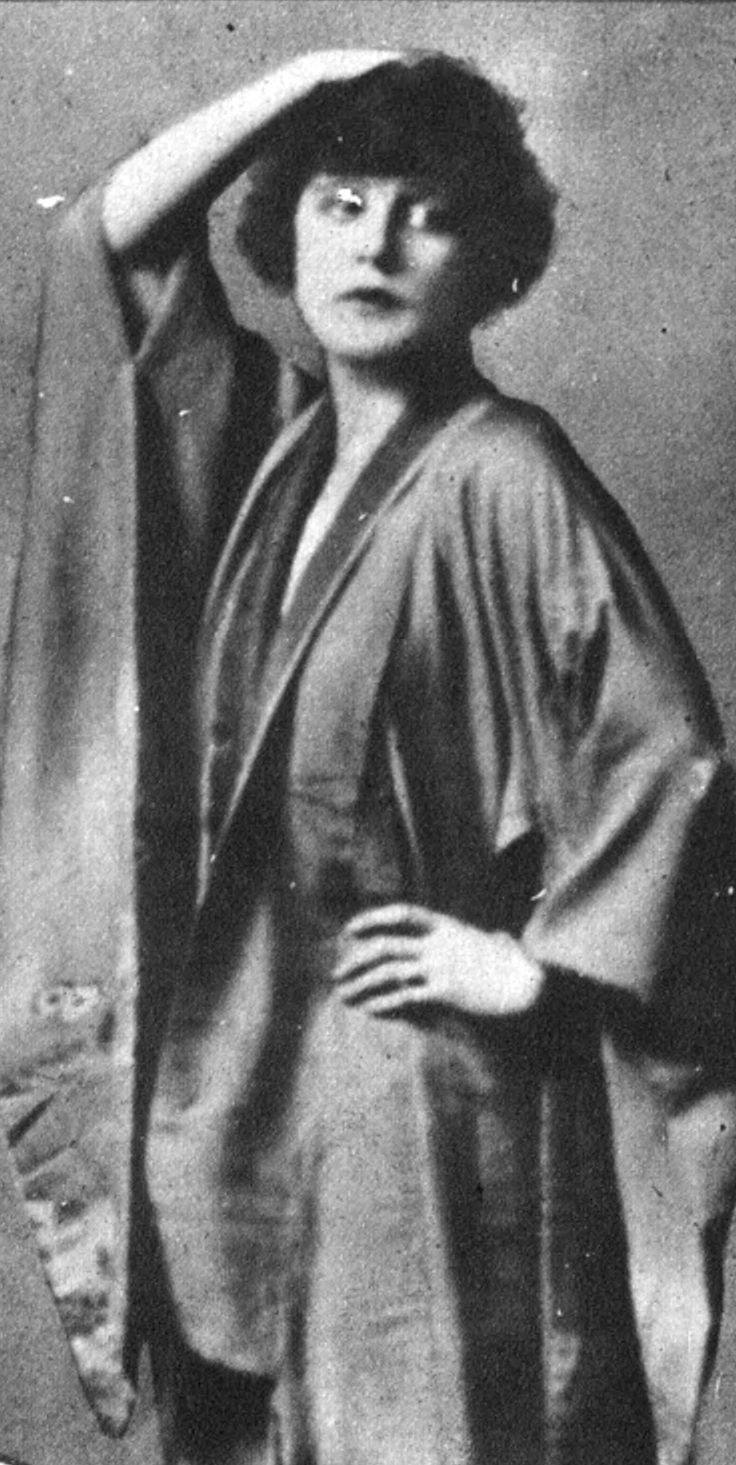
Julia Bruns, 1918

Julia Eliza Bruns (1895 – December 24, 1927) was an American stage and silent film actress and model. Bruns came to prominence for her work as a model. Her image was illustrated by artist James Montgomery Flagg in 1917. She appeared on numerous magazine covers and Sunday feature pages.

Once called "America's most beautiful girl", she eventually succumbed to alcoholism and drug addiction and died at age 32.

== Career ==
=== Stage ===
Her first acting role was in 1913 in the play The American Maid, written by John Philip Sousa, followed by a part in Help Wanted by Oliver Morosco. For a number of years she appeared on stage in the United States and Europe.

Bruns was a passenger in a Baldwin Red Devil flown by Tony Jannus, a contestant in a New York Times derby, on October 12, 1913. The plane ascended nearly 4,000 feet and flew for twenty minutes above the air at Oakwood Heights, Staten Island.

In November 1916, she was among the players in the Willard Mack theatrical drama Her Market Value. It was produced at the Olympic Theatre in Chicago, Illinois. The play had a cast of fifty. Bruns appeared in the comedy, The Squab Farm (1918). The play was staged at the Bijou Theatre on Broadway, and it was Tallulah Bankhead's first stage role. When Bankhead was rebuked for whistling in the communal dressing room, unknowingly breaking one of the theater's oldest superstitions, Bruns took pity on her and invited to share her dressing room.

Bruns was involved in an accident at the Loews 7th Avenue Theatre in New York City, in 1918. The theatre closed for several days due to the incident. It reopened on October 7, with a presentation of The Blue Pearl.

She returned to New York in January 1920 after appearing as a vamp in London, England, in Business Before Pleasure and Potash and Perlmutter (1915). In the latter she played the role of a typist. Bruns starred in Beware of Dogs (1920) at the Broadhurst Theatre. The comedy showcased the talents of William Hodge. He wrote the play in addition to being among its featured performers.

=== Films ===
She made three motion pictures in Hollywood. They are No Place For Father (1913), At First Sight (1917), and Quand on aime (1919). The first movie was directed by Lionel Barrymore and released by Biograph Studios located in The Bronx. Playing the role of Nell in At First Sight, Bruns worked with actress Mae Murray and actor Sam Hardy. Her final film was made in France and paired her with actor Paul Guide and director Henry Houry.

== Drug addiction and legal issues ==
In 1926, Bruns wrote a series of articles about her life as a drug addict and her effort to find a cure. She was jailed in Chicago, Illinois for theft of jewels worth $1,000 in September 1925. Bruns refused to accompany officers to jail unless her Chow Chow, Babe, and Von Hindenburg, a German Shepherd, came with her. Inside her cell, she kept her dogs and an autographed picture of Enrico Caruso. She was given a cigarette and began to talk freely with detectives. Bruns admitted stealing the jewels to obtain money to purchase narcotics.

== Death ==
Bruns died of alcohol poisoning in a furnished room at 109 East 105th Street, in New York City, in 1927. She was discovered dying early on the evening of December 24 by automobile agency manager Charles H. Brile. Dr. Donato Bracco of 341 East 116th Street was notified but arrived after Bruns had died.
