= The Squab Farm =

Play by Fanny Hatton and Frederic Hatton

The Squab Farm was a comedic play about the film industry staged on Broadway in 1918. It was written by Fanny Hatton and Frederic Hatton, and staged at the Bijou Theatre on Broadway. It starred several former film directors as well as actress Alma Tell and a 16-year-old Tallulah Bankhead in her first stage role. She was reportedly chastised for whistling in the communal dressing room, unknowingly breaking one of the theater's oldest superstitions and fellow actress Julia Bruns took pity on her and invited to share her dressing room. George Foster Platt directed.

Helen Barnes also had a role in the show and a New York Times reviewer wrote in a May 14, 1918, that Barnes appeared to be the audience's favorite squab. The play was a satire that compared a motion picture set to a barnyard. Barnes played the role of Hortense Hogan. The Squab Farm closed after a four-week run.

The show was presented by Lee Shubert and J. J. Shubert.

The Squab Farm featured in The Passing Show of 1918, a revue that included a young Fred Astaire as well as his sister Adele Astaire.

== Plot ==
A movie director seeks an actress to fulfill his desires for a role as Eve.

== Cast ==
The cast included:

- Lowell Sherman as a film director
- William L. Gibson as a business manager
- Harry Davenport (actor) as an assistant director
- Charles M. Seay as a film director
- Fred Kaufman (actor) as a cameraman
- Alfred Drayton as an office boy
- Raymond Bloomer as a leading man
- G. Oliver Smith as a juvenile
- Julia Bruns as a leading woman
- Bert Angeles as a cinematographer
- Alma Tell as a young actress
- Vivian Rushmore as a scenario writer
- Ann Austin (actress) as a duchess
