= Frank George Seyfang =

- Born: June 17, 1890; Findlay, Ohio, U.S.
- Died: February 10, 1963 (aged 72); Atlantic City, New Jersey, U.S.
- Known for: Ballooning

Frank George Seyfang (June 17, 1890 – February 10, 1963) was an American pioneer balloonist who developed the windsock balloon. He was a protégé of Thomas Scott Baldwin.

== Patent ==
- U.S. patent 2,907,875 Emergency Radio (1957)
