= Bert Angeles =

American film director

Albert Sidney Angeles (1875 – May 1950) was a theatre actor and director of silent films. Born in London, he worked in the USA as a writer and director for Vitagraph, later directing for Universal.

Angeles acted on stage before his film career, as well as composing music. He quietly married film actress Edith Halleren (also spelled Halleran or Halloran) in 1913. In 1915, he was hired to make comedies for the Santa Barbara Motion Picture Company. That same year, copyrights were filed for Billy studies music, Billy now a medico, and Billy's stratagem, credited as "by Bert Angeles". These were part of a series of Billy movies.

Angeles was cast along two other former directors in The Squab Farm, a comedy on Broadway about the cinema world.

In 1928, Angeles and Julia Parker starred in a singing, dancing and comedy show called One Born Every Minute, which was written about by the magazine Billboard.

Angeles died in New York City in 1950.

== Filmography ==
- Sleuthing
- He Answered the Ad (1913)
- A Lady and Her Maid(1913)
- The Suit at Ten (1914)
- A Maid and Three Men
- Cutey Tries Reporting
- The Coming of Gretchen
- Roughing the Cub
- Belinda, series
