= American observation balloon service in World War I =

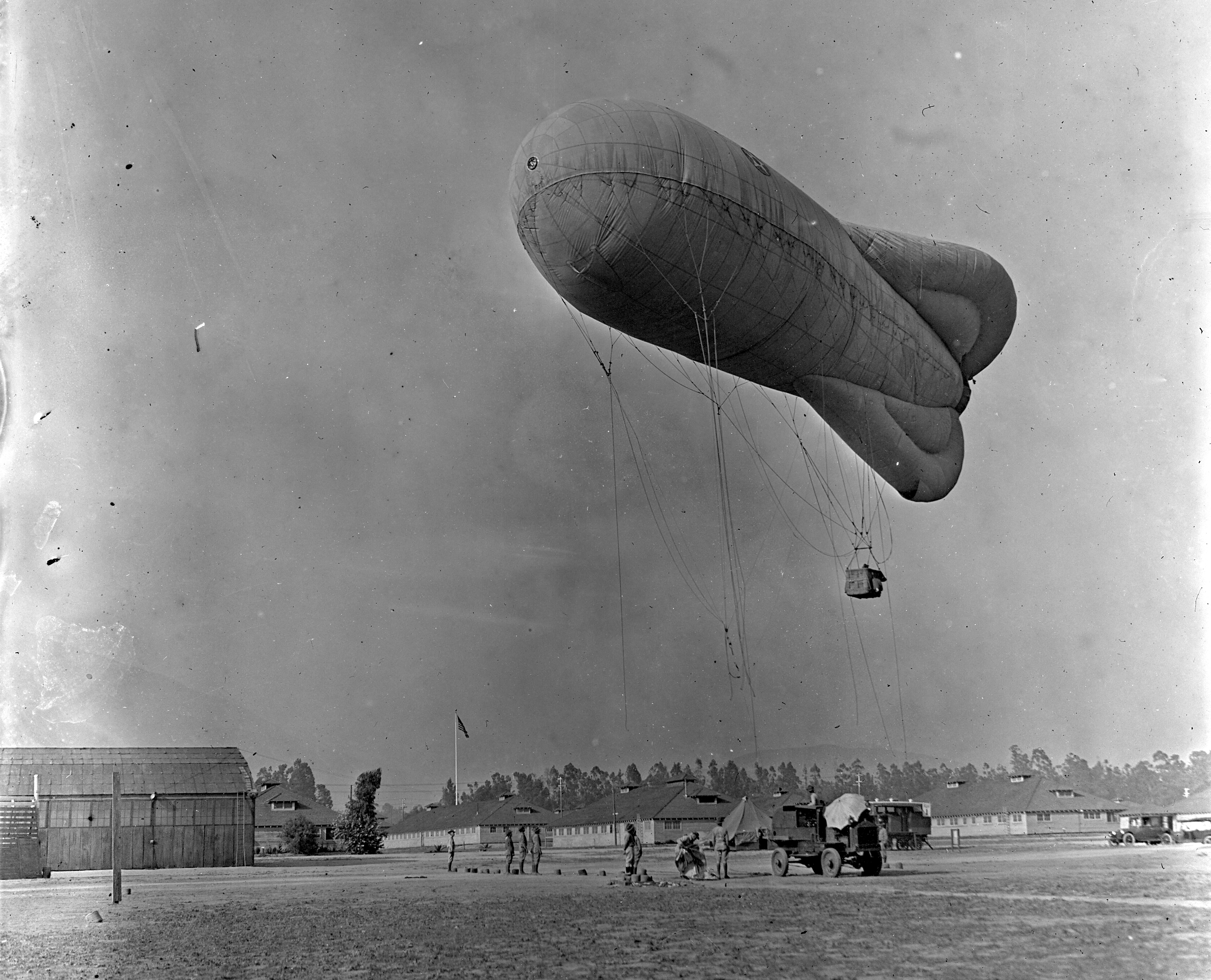
Type R Balloon (a Caquot dirigible) and winch truck at Ross Field

United States Army balloon squadrons and companies organized under the Aviation Section, U.S. Signal Corps and served overseas with the United States Army Air Service before and during World War I. There were also French, British, and German balloon corps.

The history of military ballooning includes the American Civil War era Union Army Balloon Corps and the even earlier French Aerostatic Corps.

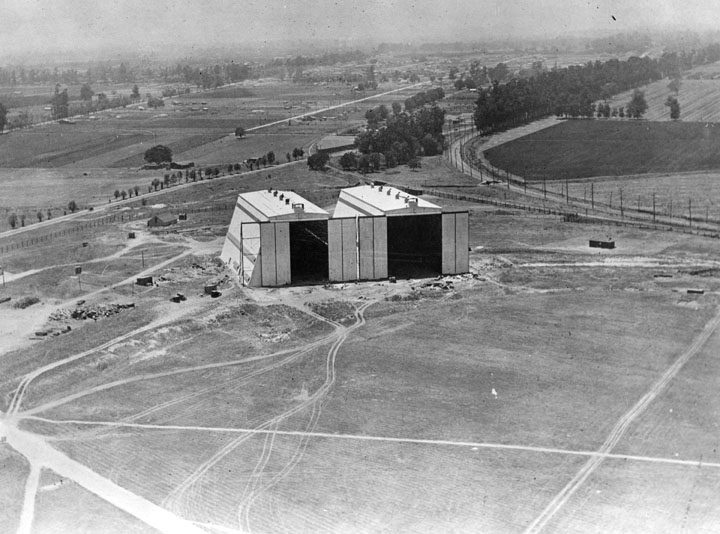
Hangars from the U.S. Army's Ross Field Balloon School, 1922

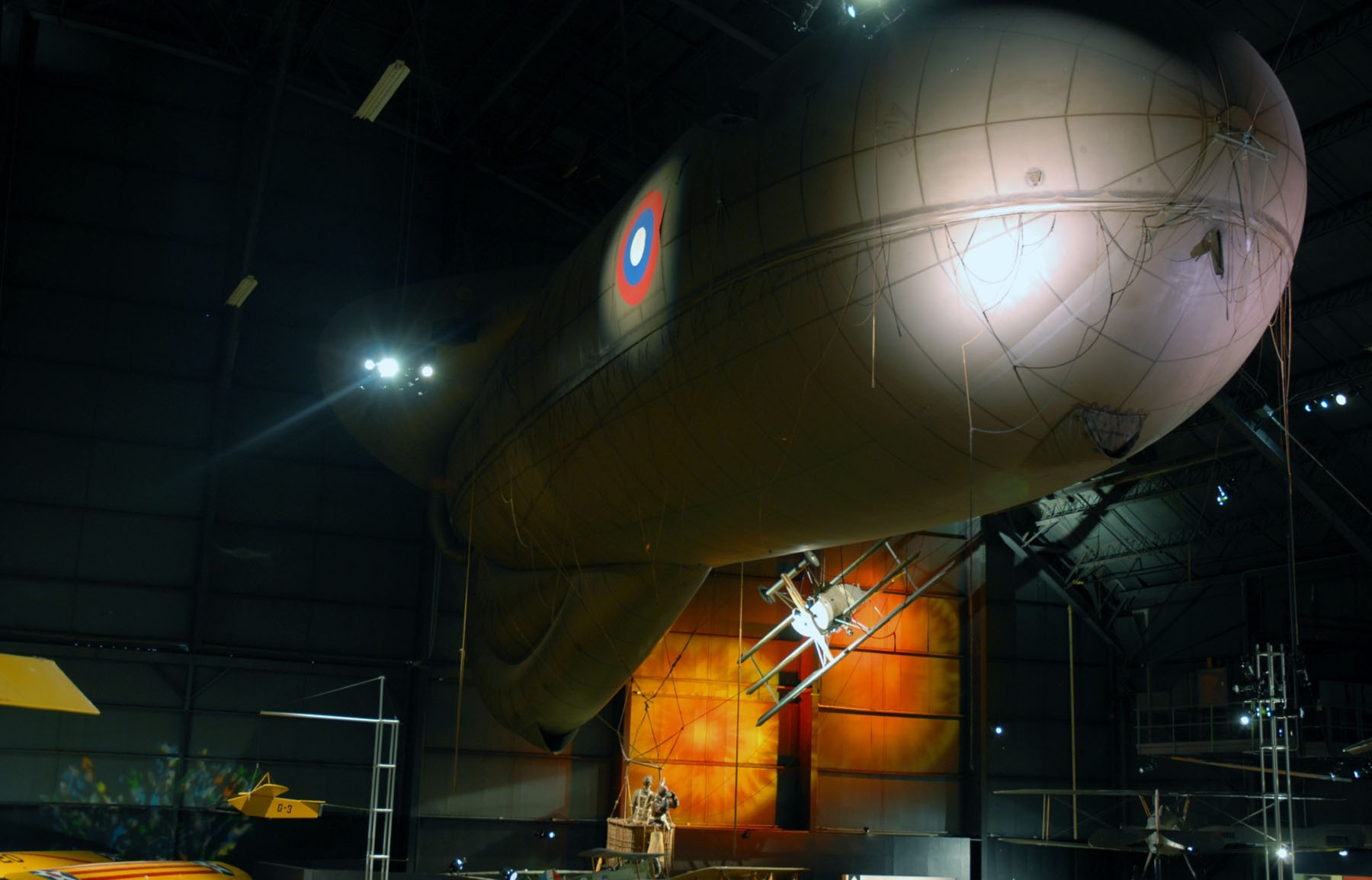
Caquot Type R Observation balloon at USAF Museum

At the start of World War I, the organization of the Air Service of the American Expeditionary Force included observation balloon units organized into companies, squadrons, and wings and each company was equipped with one balloon. Five companies comprised a squadron, and three squadrons made up a wing. By the end of the war 110 companies had been created. In the field Balloon companies were allotted to the ground units they supported as needed. In 1918 June, with squadron organization discontinued, company designations were numbered and organized into groups. Only 35 companies made it to France with the American Expeditionary Force (AEF). 17 companies served at the front, making 1,642 combat ascensions, while six other groups were en route to the front at the armistice.

After the war, the National Association of American Balloon Corps Veterans was organized and published a history of the service: Eyes of the Army : a story about the Observation Balloon Service of World War I by Craig S. Herbert. The group published a quarterly newsletter titled Haul Down and Ease Off.

== 1 to 50 ==
- 1st Balloon Squadron
  - A, 14-Aug-1917, Split into 25th, and 26th 16-Feb-1918
  - B,
  - C,
  - D,
  - HHC
- 2d Balloon Squadron
  - A, - 1st Balloon company 1-Oct-1917 (AEF)
  - B, - 2nd Balloon company ?-?-1917 (AEF)
  - C, - 3rd Balloon company 13-Sept-1917 (AEF)
  - D, - 4th Balloon company 25-Sept-1917 (AEF)
  - HHC
- 3d Balloon Squadron
  - A, - 5th Balloon company 4-Nov-1917 (AEF)
  - B, - 6th Balloon company 4-Nov-1917 (AEF)
  - C, - 7th Balloon company 3-Nov-1917 (AEF)
  - D, - 8th Balloon company 4-Nov-1917 (AEF)
  - HHC
- 4th Balloon Squadron
  - A, - 9th Balloon company 14-Nov-1917 (AEF)
  - B, - 10th Balloon company 14-Nov-1917 (AEF)
  - C, - 13th Balloon company 22-Jan-1918 (AEF)
  - D, - 14th Balloon company 13-Nov-1917 (AEF)
  - HHC
- 5th Balloon Squadron
  - A, - 11th Balloon company ?-?-? (AEF)
  - B, - 12th Balloon company ?-?-? (AEF)
  - C, - 15th Balloon company ?-?-? (AEF)
  - D, - 16th Balloon company 14-Dec-1917 (AEF)
  - HHC
- 17th Balloon company 21-Jan-1918 (AEF)
- 18th Balloon company 21-Jan-1918 (AEF)
- 19th Balloon company 24-Jan-1918 (AEF)
- 20th Balloon company 24-Jan-1918 (AEF)
- 21st Balloon company
- 22d Balloon company
- 23d Balloon company 16-Feb-1918 (AEF)
- 24th Balloon company 17-Jan-1918 Fort Monroe (AEF)
- 25th Balloon company 16-Feb-1918 Post Field (AEF)
- 26th Balloon company 2-April-1918 Post Field (AEF)
- 27th Balloon company
- 28th Balloon company
- 29th Balloon company
- 30th Balloon company 6-March-1918 Waco Army Airfield (AEF)
- 31st Balloon company Camp Knox (US Signal Corps)
- 32d Balloon company
- 33d Balloon company
- 34th Balloon company 30-Mar-1918 Camp Wise (AEF)
- 35th Balloon company 30-Mar-1918 Camp Wise (AEF)
- 36th Balloon company 30-Mar-1918 Camp Wise (AEF)
- 37th Balloon company
- 38th Balloon company
- 39th Balloon company
- 40th Balloon company
- 41st Balloon company
- 42d Balloon company 20-Mar-1918 Camp Wise (AEF)
- 43d Balloon company 20-Mar-1918 Camp Wise (AEF)
- 44th Balloon company (AEF)
- 45th Balloon company (AEF)
- 46th Balloon company
- 47th Balloon company
- 48th Balloon company
- 49th Balloon company
- 50th Balloon company

== 51 to 105 ==
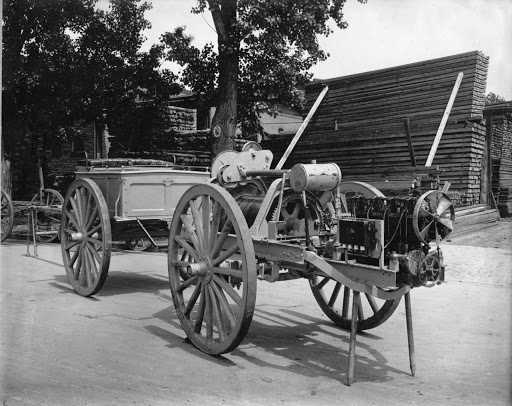
winch wagon

- 51st Balloon company
- 52d Balloon company
- 53d Balloon company
- 54th Balloon company
- 55th Balloon company
- 56th Balloon company
- 57th Balloon company
- 58th Balloon company (AEF)
- 59th Balloon company
- 60th Balloon company
- 61st Balloon company
- 62d Balloon company
- 63d Balloon company
- 64th Balloon company
- 65th Balloon company
- 66th Balloon company
- 67th Balloon company
- 68th Balloon company
- 69th Balloon company (AEF)
- 70th Balloon company
- 71st Balloon company
- 72d Balloon company
- 73d Balloon company
- 74th Balloon company
- 75th Balloon company
- 76th Balloon company
- 77th Balloon company
- 78th Balloon company
- 79th Balloon company
- 80th Balloon company
- 81st Balloon company
- 82d Balloon company
- 83d Balloon company
- 84th Balloon company
- 85th Balloon company
- 86th Balloon company
- 87th Balloon company
- 88th Balloon company
- 89th Balloon company
- 90th Balloon company
- 91st Balloon company
- 92d Balloon company
- 93d Balloon company
- 94th Balloon company
- 95th Balloon company
- 96th Balloon company
- 97th Balloon company
- 98th Balloon company
- 99th Balloon company
- 100th Balloon company
- 101st Balloon company
- 102d Balloon company
- 103d Balloon company
- 104th Balloon company
- 105th Balloon company

== See also ==
- Barrage balloon
- US Army Airships
- Camp John Wise
- Observation balloon
- Post Field
- Ross Army Airfield / Santa Anita Golf Course
- Brooks Field
- Fort Omaha Balloon School
