= Signal Corps Dirigible No. 1 =

Airship

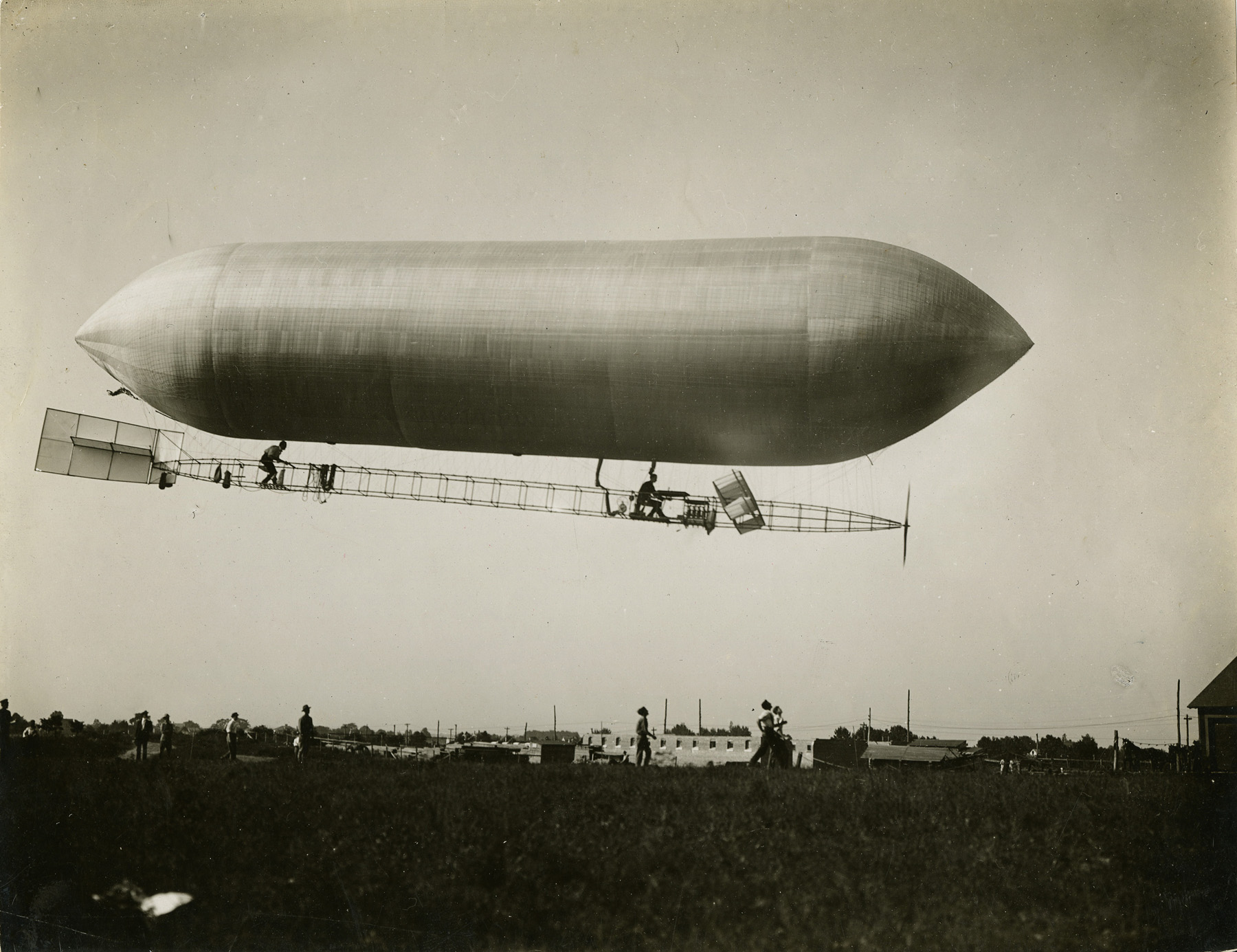

General information
- Type: Dirigible
- National origin: United States
- Designer: Thomas Scott Baldwin
- Number built: 1

Signal Corps Dirigible No. 1, 1908

Signal Corps Dirigible No. 1 was the first powered aircraft ordered for the Signal Corps by the Aeronautical Division of the United States Army. The purchase of SC-1, a dirigible designed by Thomas Scott Baldwin, was the result of urgings by Chief Signal Officer Brigadier General James Allen. After seeing Baldwin demonstrate a dirigible at the St. Louis air meet in 1907, Allen had urged the U.S. Army to buy a dirigible, as many European armies had dirigibles by the turn of the century.

On 5 August 1908, the Army tested SC-1 at Fort Myer, Virginia. The craft fell short of a two-hour, 20 mph objective to meet a $8,000 per unit award. The Army formally accepted the craft as Signal Corps Dirigible No. 1, paying $5,737.50. On 28 August 1908 Lieutenants Frank Lahm, Michael "CC" Finney, Thomas Selfridge, and Benjamin Foulois were taught to fly the craft.

After Second Lieutenant John G Winter Jr of the 6th Cavalry was assigned to duty in the Aeronautical Division, the balloon detachment was transferred to Fort Omaha, Nebraska.

On 26 May, pilot Lieutenant Lahm and Lieutenant Foulois made a flight in SC-1 at Fort Omaha, and maneuvered the craft at will. SC-1 remained there until scrapped in 1912. The Army did not purchase another dirigible until after World War I.

== Specifications (Signal Corps Dirigible No. 1) ==
Data from Smithsonian

General characteristics

- Capacity: 1
- Length: 93 ft (28 m)
- Volume: 20,000 cu ft (570 m^{3})
- Useful lift: 1,360 lb (620 kg)
- Powerplant: 1 × Curtiss , 20 hp (15 kW)

Performance

- Maximum speed: 17.04 kn (19.61 mph, 31.56 km/h)
- Cruise speed: 11.95 kn (13.75 mph, 22.13 km/h)
