= Goodyear RS-1 =

Airship

RS-1
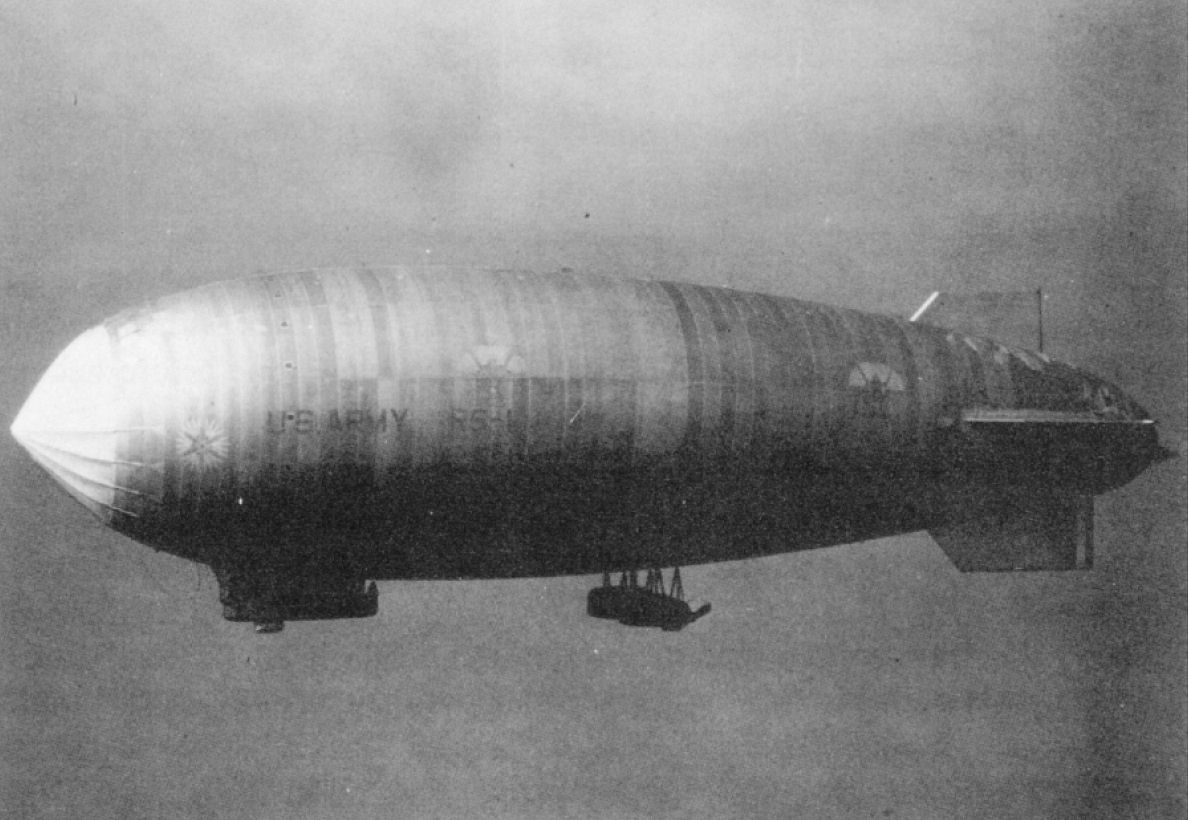
- The Goodyear RS-1 semi-rigid airship in flight, 1927

General information
- Type: Semi-rigid Airship
- Manufacturer: Goodyear Tire and Rubber Company
- Status: Scrapped in 1930
- Primary user: United States Army Air Service
- Number built: 1

History
- First flight: 8 January 1926
- Retired: November 1928

The Goodyear RS-1 was the first semi-rigid airship built in the United States. The dirigible was designed by aeronautical engineer and inventor, Herman Theodore Kraft of the Goodyear Tire and Rubber Company for the United States Army Air Service in the late 1920s. Goodyear built only one airship of this type.

== Design and development ==
The construction contract for the RS-1 was awarded to the Goodyear-Zeppelin Corporation by the US Army at a cost of $475,000. Main components of the airship were assembled in 1924 at the Goodyear hangar at Wingfoot Lake in Suffield, Ohio. The RS-1 was designed by Goodyear's chief aeronautical engineer Herman Theodore Kraft, who consulted with noted Italian semi-rigid airship designer, Colonel Umberto Nobile. Components for the dirigible were shipped from Ohio to Scott Field, Illinois for assembly in the base's 810 foot airship hangar in early 1925. The initial flight of the RS-1 was postponed due to an error made by a rigger during assembly. On January 8, 1926, the airship's first flight was made with a crew of eight men and lasted just over an hour. The RS-1 was 282 feet (85.9 m) long and had a gas volume of 720,000 cu ft (20,388,130 L) and was initially powered by four 300 horsepower, 12 cylinder Liberty engines. In 1927, the Liberty engines were replaced with more powerful and weight-saving 500 horsepower, 2A-1500 Packard engines. A 35 ft (10.7 m) enclosed control car was suspended from the keel at the nose. The control car included a radio compartment, sleeping accommodations and a small galley. Equipment included a bombing cockpit and the ability to carry 3,500 lb (1,588 kg) of bombs, as well as machine gun mounts on each side at the forward end of the car. The primary purpose of the RS-1 was for the Army to study and evaluate the performance and capabilities of the semi-rigid type of airship. Following its maiden flight in January 1926, The RS-1 made several more flights until November 1928, when it was ordered grounded after an inspection revealed deterioration of the envelope. Due to the poor economic conditions on the cusp of the Great Depression, a replacement envelope was never ordered and the RS-1 never flew again. For over a year, the dirigible remained in the hanger at Scott Field and eventually was deflated and dismantled in early 1930. The components of the RS-1, including the control car, keel, engine gondolas, control surfaces, cables and various parts were sold to a scrap dealer for $900.

However, when Army Air Corps personnel inspected the Goodyear plant in May, 1930, a complete spare envelope for the RS-1 was discovered, along with large quantities of sheet and tubular duralumin, forms, jigs, patterns and dies left over from the airship's original purchase contract, No.562. The Army had provided for Goodyear to retain these materials for three years after the experimental airship's delivery. It was recommended that most of the materials be returned to Wright Field, the envelope, and cardboard ballonet and cantonary templates being recommended for destruction.

== Operators ==
United States

- United States Army Air Service

== Specifications ==
Data from Flight 25 March 1926

General characteristics

- Length: 282 ft 0 in (85.95 m)
- Diameter: 70 ft 6 in (21.49 m)
- Volume: 720,000 cu ft (20,000 m^{3})
- Powerplant: 4 × Liberty L-12 , 400 hp (300 kW) each

Performance

- Maximum speed: 70 mph (110 km/h, 61 kn)
- Cruise speed: 55 mph (89 km/h, 48 kn)

== See also ==
- Roma (airship)
- United States Army airships
- Zeppelin NT, a trio of which are American-based (2010s)
