= Thomas Scott Baldwin =

US Army aviator and balloonist (1854–1923)

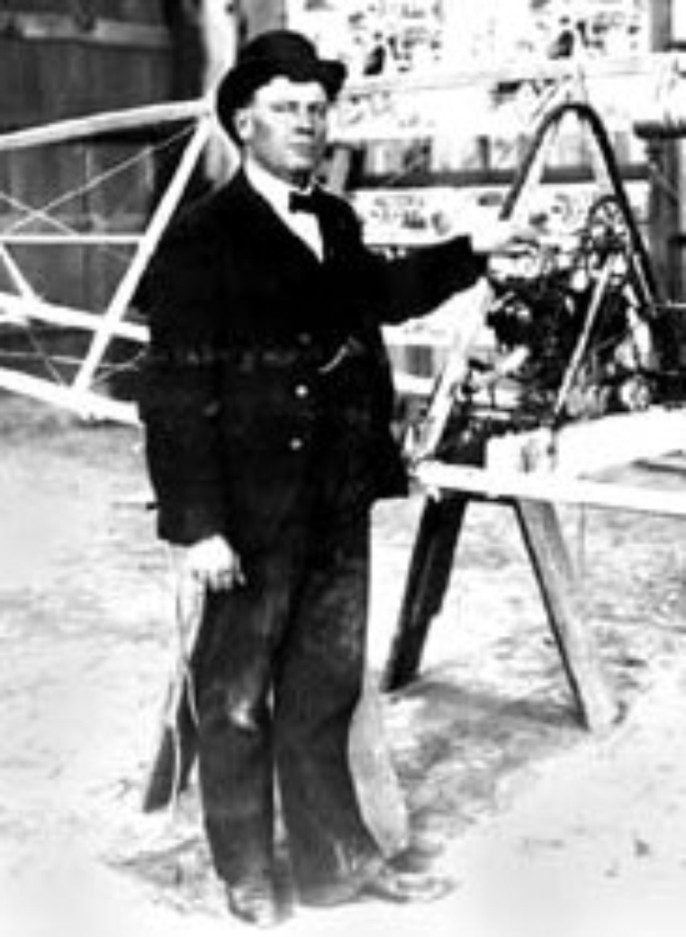
- Born: June 30, 1854; Marion County, Missouri, US
- Died: May 17, 1923 (aged 68); Buffalo, New York, US
- Resting place: Arlington National Cemetery Arlington, Virginia
- Occupation: Balloonist
- Spouse: Cary Poole
- Parent(s): Jane and Samuel Yates Baldwin

Thomas Scott Baldwin (June 30, 1854 – May 17, 1923) was a pioneer balloonist and U.S. Army major during World War I. He was the first American to descend from a balloon by parachute.

== Early career ==
Thomas Scott Baldwin was born on June 30, 1854, to Jane and Samuel Yates Baldwin. He worked as a brakeman on the Illinois railroad, then joined a circus working as an acrobat. In 1875, he started an act combining trapeze and a hot air balloon.

On January 30, 1887, he made one of the earliest recorded parachute jumps from a balloon. Baldwin repeated the feat on multiple occasions as a paid entertainer, netting $1500 from one dangerous jump over the water from 600 feet at Rockaway Beach in August 1887 marred by parachute difficulties.

== Powered balloons ==
In 1900, Baldwin created a small pedal-motorized powered airship. It never served as anything more than a curiosity. In 1902–1903 he supervised the construction of California Eagle, based on the ideas of August Greth and financed by the American Aerial Navigation Company of San Francisco. It utilized a De Dion-Bouton engine and paddle propeller based on marine technology so prevalent in airship design in the period. After collaborating with Greth and John J. Montgomery in 1903–1904, Baldwin acquired sufficient knowledge to begin his own independent airship project.

In June and July 1904, Baldwin built an aerodynamic cigar-shaped hydrogen-filled dirigible California Arrow, using a 7 hp (5.2 kW) Hercules motorcycle engine manufactured by Glenn H. Curtiss. California Arrow made the first controlled circular flight in America on August 3, 1904, at Idora Park in Oakland, California. In October and November, 1904, the aircraft was piloted by Roy Knabenshue at the 1904 Louisiana Purchase Exposition in St. Louis, Missouri.

Signal Corps Dirigible No. 1, 1908

In August 1908, after several test flights at Fort Myer, Virginia, the Army Signal Corps paid Baldwin US$10,000 for a dirigible that could be used for sustained and controlled navigation. Baldwin created a dirigible that was 95 feet (29 m) long and powered by a new, more powerful Curtiss engine. The Army bought it and designated it Signal Corps Dirigible No. 1. Baldwin picked up the sobriquet, "Father of the American Dirigible". He received the Aero Club of America's first balloon pilot certificate.

== Airplane ==
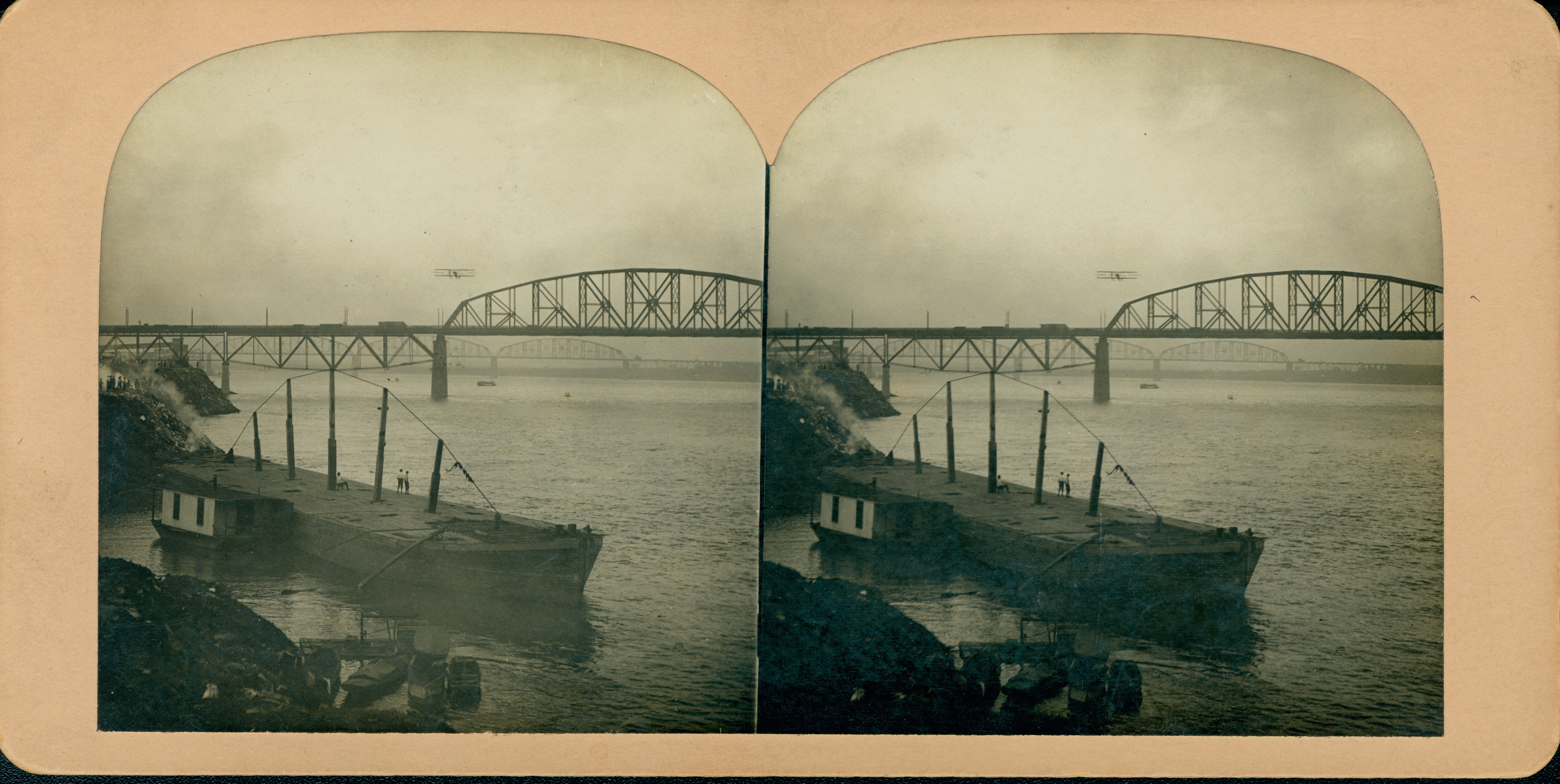
Baldwin flying near the McKinley Bridge

In 1910 Baldwin designed his own airplane, and it was built by Glenn Hammond Curtiss. It used a 25 horsepower (19 kW), four-cylinder Curtiss engine that was later replaced by a Curtiss V-8 engine.

On September 10, 1910, Baldwin made history with the first airplane flight over the Mississippi River. The St. Louis flight started just east of Bellefontaine Cemetery. Baldwin and his Red Devil plane took off at 5:11 p.m. 200,000 citizens lined the riverfront on both sides to watch the red biplane fly from the north St. Louis field and land in Illinois across the river from Arsenal Street. On the return flight, the aviator astounded the crowds by flying under both the Eads and McKinley bridges at fifty miles per hour (80 km/h). Baldwin landed at 6:05 back at his starting place.

Baldwin flew it at an air meet in Kansas City, Missouri, on October 7, 1910. He spoke to State University of Iowa engineering students on October 11, 1910 and flew demonstrations at the Iowa City, Iowa fairgrounds on October 12–13, 1910. The flight on October 12 was unsuccessful. On October 13, he flew two flights, one of which was photographed by Julius Robert Hecker. On the second flight he did not gain sufficient altitude and the plane was damaged on a barn but he was uninjured. He then took his airplane to Belmont, New York. He put together a company of aerial performers including J.C. "Bud" Mars and Tod Shriver in December 1910 and toured countries in Asia, making the first airplane flights in many of those locations. The troupe returned to the United States in the spring of 1911.

== Red Devil ==
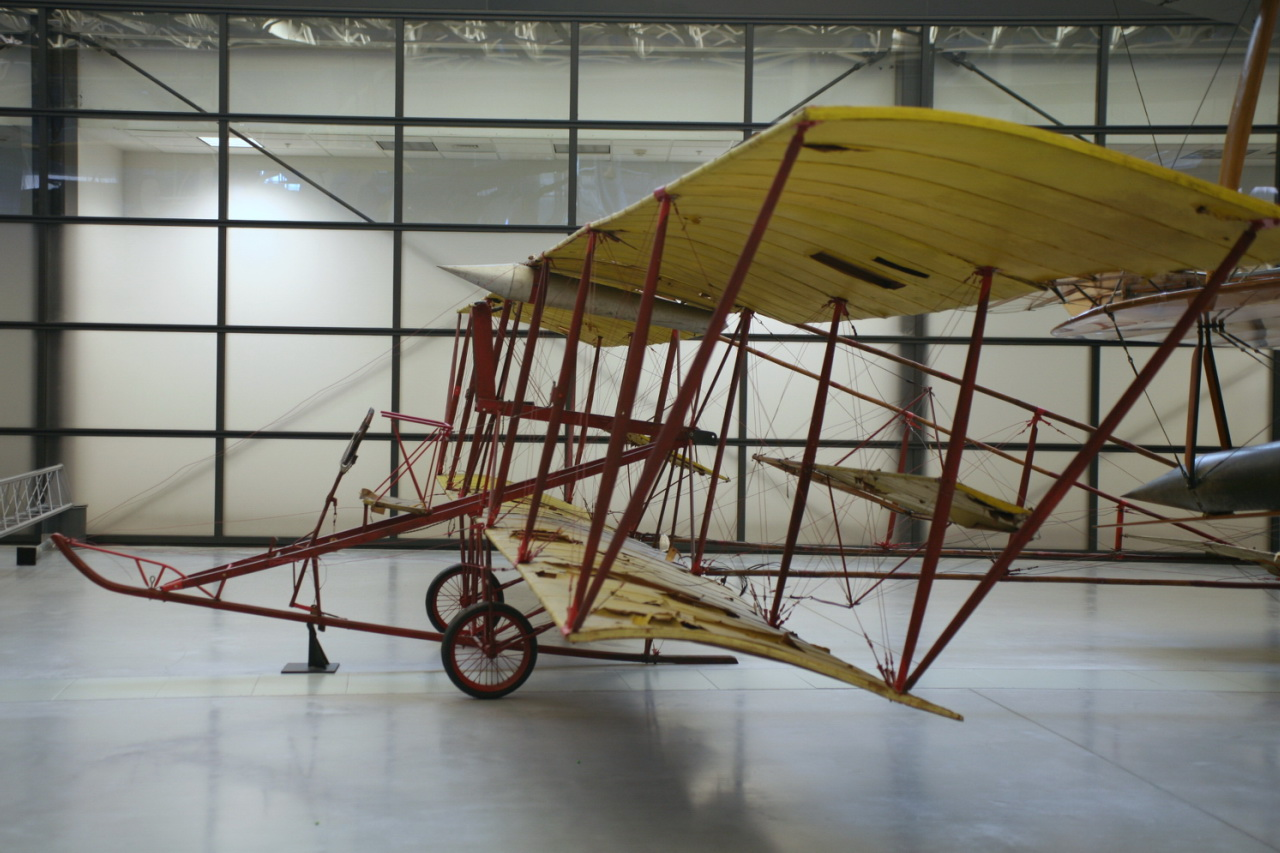
Baldwin's Red Devil, located at the Steven F. Udvar-Hazy Center

Baldwin met Cecil Peoli at a model aircraft competition and offered to teach him to fly. At seventeen, flying a Baldwin-designed biplane, Peoli qualified at the Mineola, Long Island airfield on June 22, 1912, becoming the youngest person to gain a pilot's license. Baldwin sponsored Peoli flying a Red Devil on the U.S.-Canada exhibition circuit in 1912 and 1913.

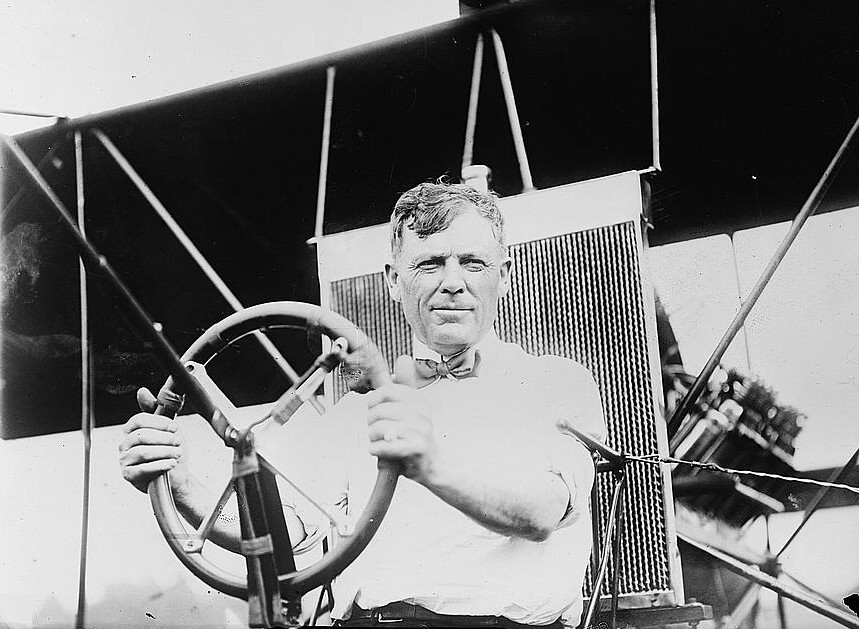
Baldwin at the wheel of the Red Devil

In 1914 he returned to dirigible design and development, and built the U.S. Navy's first successful dirigible, the DN-I. He began training airplane pilots and managed the Curtiss School at Newport News, Virginia. One of his students was Billy Mitchell, who would later become an advocate of American military air power.

When the United States entered the World War I, Baldwin volunteered his services to the United States Army. He was commissioned a captain in the Aviation Section, U. S. Signal Corps and appointed Chief of Army Balloon Inspection and Production. Consequently, he personally inspected every lighter-than-air craft built for and used by the Army during the war. He was promoted to the rank of major during the war.

After the war, he joined the Goodyear Tire and Rubber Company in Akron, Ohio, as a designer and manufacturer of their airships.

== Death ==
T.S. Baldwin died on May 17, 1923, in Buffalo, New York, at the age of 68. He was buried in Arlington National Cemetery in Arlington, Virginia.

== Aero Club of America licenses ==
- Balloon Pilot Certificate #1
- Airship Pilot Certificate #9
- Airplane Pilot Certificate #7

== Legacy ==
Baldwin was inducted into the National Aviation Hall of Fame in 1964.

== See also ==
- Adventurers' Club of New York
- Frank George Seyfang – protégé of Thomas Scott Baldwin
