= Cecil Peoli =

American aviator

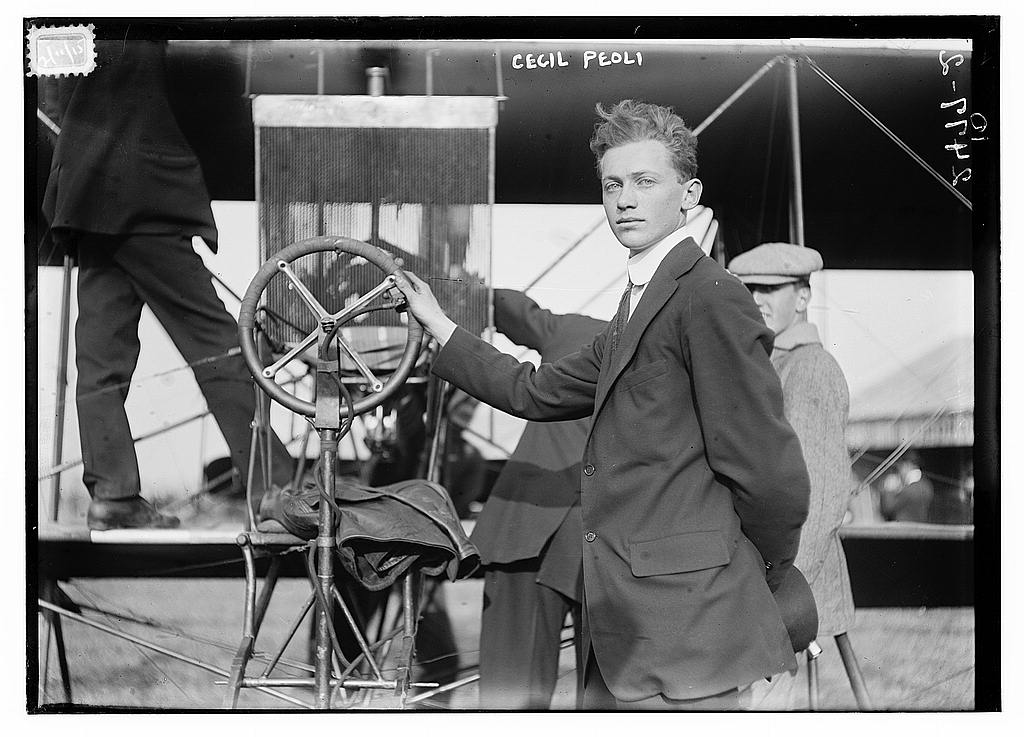
Cecil Peoli on October 3, 1913, with the Red Devil

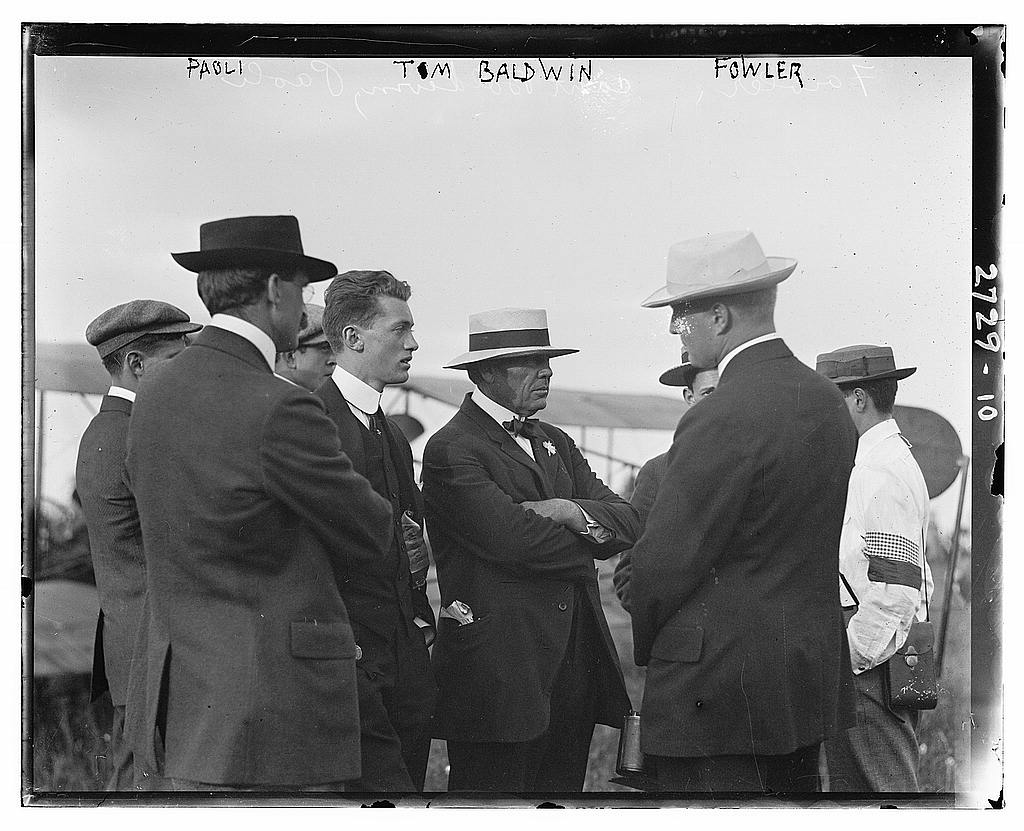
Cecil Peoli, Tom Baldwin, and Robert Fowler on October 3, 1913

Cecil Malcolm Peoli (October 13, 1894 – April 12, 1915) was an American aviator. He was, at the time of his death, the youngest professional aviator in the world.

== Biography ==
Peoli was born on October 13, 1894, in New York City to Fanny Cassandra (née Smith) and Marino G. Peoli. His father was in the retail bicycle business and active in the cycling community in New York. His grandfather was the American-born Cuban artist and art collector Juan Jorge Peoli (1825–1893). Cecil Peoli attended Townsend Harris Hall (then a preparatory school of City College of New York) and was active in sports there, particularly gymnastics and diving.

Peoli joined the New York Model Aero Club, designing model aircraft and joining in competitions in the New York area. He established a distance record for model aircraft propelled by rubber bands. His 24-inch "A" frame craft flew a record distance of 1691 feet, 6 inches in competition in 1911. He granted the Ideal Airplane and Supply Company rights to produce his "Cecil Peoli Racer" model kit in February 1912; the kit was a popular model with hobbyists, displaced only in the 1930s by model kits of Lindbergh's "Spirit of St. Louis."

Peoli learned to fly in 1912, training with Thomas Scott Baldwin. At seventeen, Peoli became the youngest person to qualify as a pilot; flying a Baldwin-designed biplane, Peoli qualified at the Mineola, Long Island airfield on June 22, 1912 (No. 141 on the "Holders of Aviator's Certificates of the Aero Club of America, issued under F.A.I. Rules" listing). Working with Baldwin in 1912 and 1913, Peoli flew in 200 exhibition engagements in the U.S. and Canada.

In April 1914, he became the first pilot to fly over the Andes from Caracas to La Guaira, completing the first air mail service delivery during the flight, delivering five letters.

The young aviator was adept at promotion, and Peoli's flights were frequently mentioned in newspapers. The New York Times noted in June 1912 that he "raced" Harriet Quimby, their planes reaching the airfield simultaneously in Long Island.

In January 1915, he formed the Peoli Aeroplane Company with a group of investors and bid successfully on a U.S. Navy contract to supply nine hydro-aeroplanes. The company planned to produce an armor-plated plane for New York and St. Louis cross-country trials. Company directors included bankers and real estate developers Joseph P. Day, Hugh L. Cooper, Nicholas F. Brady, and Harold Roberts.

Peoli's design, a biplane with a 150 hp Rausenberger motor, 48-foot spread on the upper surface and 32 foot spread on the lower plane, was manufactured by the Washington Aeroplane Company. During its first test flight at the U.S. Army Aviation Field in College Park, Maryland on April 12, 1915, the biplane crashed at the edge of the airfield, killing Peoli. The collapse of the aircraft indicated that the construction was too weak to carry its heavy load. James Lee Simmons of the Washington Aeroplane Company, which built the plane, speculated that Peoli's decision not to take a 93-pound weight as ballast contributed to the crash, as the plane was thought to be "tail heavy."
