= Fort Omaha =

- Fort Omaha Historic District
- U.S. National Register of Historic Places
- U.S. Historic district
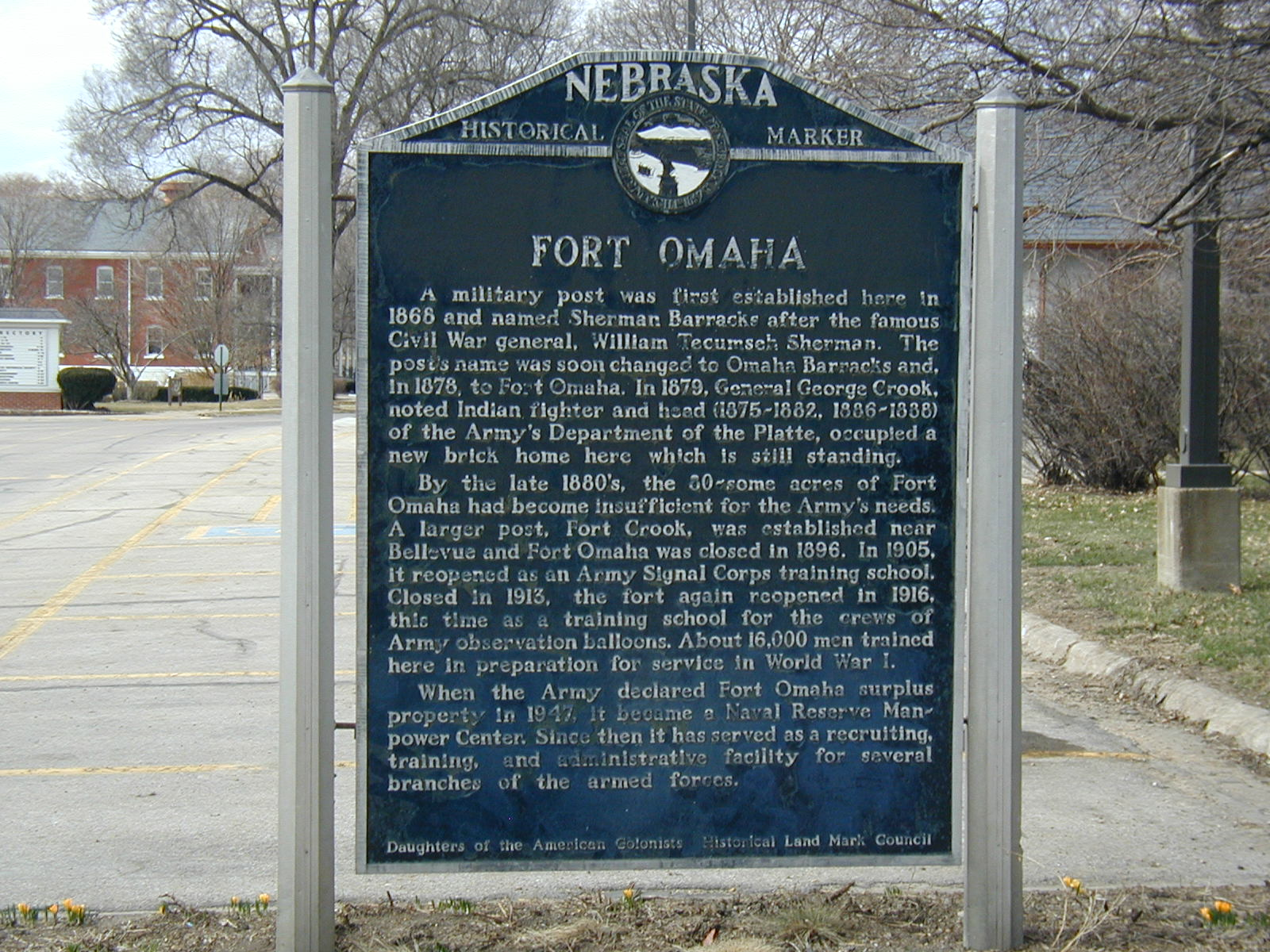
- Nebraska State Historical Marker for Fort Omaha at the corner of 30th and Fort Streets

- Location within Nebraska Location within the United States
- Location: Omaha, Nebraska
- Coordinates: 41°18′25″N 95°57′26″W
- Built: December 5, 1868
- Website: www.nps.gov/places/fort-omaha-historic-district.htm
- NRHP reference No.: 74001112
- Added to NRHP: March 27, 1974

Fort Omaha, originally known as Sherman Barracks and then Omaha Barracks, is an Indian War-era United States Army supply installation. Located at 5730 North 30th Street, with the entrance at North 30th and Fort Streets in modern-day North Omaha, Nebraska, the facility is primarily occupied by the Metropolitan Community College. A Navy Operational Support Center and a Marine Corps Reserve unit occupy the periphery of the 82.5 acres (33.4 ha) fort. The government deeded all but four parcels of the land to the Metropolitan Community College in 1974.

The post is where Ponca Chief Standing Bear and 29 fellow Ponca were held prior to the landmark 1879 trial of Standing Bear v. Crook. Judge Elmer Dundy determined that American Indians were persons within the meaning of the law and that the Ponca were illegally detained after leaving the Indian Territory in January 1879. The Fort Omaha historic district is listed on the National Register of Historic Places. The district includes the 1879 General Crook House Museum, as well as the 1879 Quartermaster's office, 1878 commissary, 1884 guardhouse, 1883 ordnance magazine and 1887 mule stables.

== About ==
Opened in 1868 as a supply depot for various forts along the Platte River, Fort Omaha is primarily occupied by the Metropolitan Community College. It continues to house Navy, Marine and Army Reserve units. The fort is located in the present-day Miller Park neighborhood of North Omaha. The site includes the General Crook House, which is listed separately on the National Register of Historic Places (NRHP). The entire fort is listed as an historic district on the NRHP.

== History ==
Sherman Barracks, also known as Camp Sherman, was established on December 5, 1868 by Captain William Sinclair of the 3rd U.S. Artillery and named in honor of Lt. General William Tecumseh Sherman. It was located on an 82.5-acre tract 4 miles (6.4 km) north of Omaha and 1 1/2 miles (2.4 km) south of Florence. Pioneer entrepreneur Augustus Kountze sold land for the installation to the federal government. The following year, the name was changed to Omaha Barracks. General Sherman was said to have complained about such a small site being named after him.

On December 30, 1878, the post was designated Fort Omaha. During this same time period, the U.S. Army's Department of the Platte was organized. The fort was the department's headquarters from 1878 to 1881. The post, however, remained home to upwards of ten companies of the 2nd Infantry until 1896, when the garrison was relocated to Fort Crook near Bellevue.

Fort Omaha was the site where Chief Standing Bear was held prior to the 1879 trial of Standing Bear v. Crook. Standing Bear, a Ponca chief, successfully argued in the U.S. District Court that Native Americans were "persons within the meaning of the law" and had rights of citizenship. During the trial, Standing Bear was assisted by Susette LaFlesche Tibbles, a famous Omaha woman who was the daughter of Iron Eye, the last recognized chief of the Omaha. His lawyer was Andrew Jackson Poppleton, a pioneer Omaha attorney who held the position of general attorney for the Union Pacific Railroad. The trial was the most important of Poppleton's career. Both the fort's significant role in US military history in relation to the Indian Wars, and this important civil rights trial, contributed to the site's being listed as a historic district on the National Register of Historic Places.

The Spanish–American War brought the fort into usage as a muster point for troops from across Nebraska. Camp Meiklejohn, Camp Augur and Camp Vincent were all subordinate troop sites around Omaha under command of the fort.

In World War II, Fort Omaha was used as a prisoner-of-war camp to house Italian Army soldiers captured in Europe.

=== Notable personnel ===
- Major General George Crook
- Major General Stuart Heintzelman
- Brigadier General Dan Christie Kingman
- Brigadier General George G. Lundberg

=== Fort Omaha Balloon School ===
In 1907, the Army built a large steel hangar at Fort Omaha for use in experiments with dirigibles, a program that was abandoned in 1909. This program and its successor were part of the American Expeditionary Forces. A balloon house was built in 1908, and in 1909, the first balloon flight took place. The military acquired additional space for training called Florence Field, at the corner of North 30th and Martin Streets in North Omaha.

Shortly after the United States entered World War I, 800 men immediately enlisted in the Aviation Section, U.S. Signal Corps. They were sent to the Fort Omaha Balloon School for training. They later provided forward observations for the artillery. More than 16,000 airmen went through the Balloon School.

In 1917, the Army determined that weather conditions at Fort Omaha were not suitable for rapidly training balloon companies. The next year, a contingent of officers and men from Fort Omaha were assigned to Camp John Wise in Texas. The Balloon School at Fort Omaha was soon ended. Meanwhile, at the Florence Field site on May 2, 1918, two soldiers were burned to death and thirteen seriously burned when a Caquot-type balloon exploded.

==== Notable personnel ====
- Major Charles DeF. Chandler
- Captain Frank Purdy Lahm
- Lieutenant Thomas Selfridge
- Lieutenant Benjamin Foulois
- Lieutenant Kent Curtis

== Historic District ==
There are six extant 19th-century structures in Fort Omaha, and the site overall has been judged significant in US history. Because of this, Fort Omaha has received numerous historical designations. The Department of the Interior designated Fort Omaha a historic district, and listed the Crook House on the National Register of Historic Places. In 1982, the Fort Omaha Guardhouse was designated a Landmark under the City of Omaha's Landmark Heritage Preservation Ordinance.

=== General Crook House ===
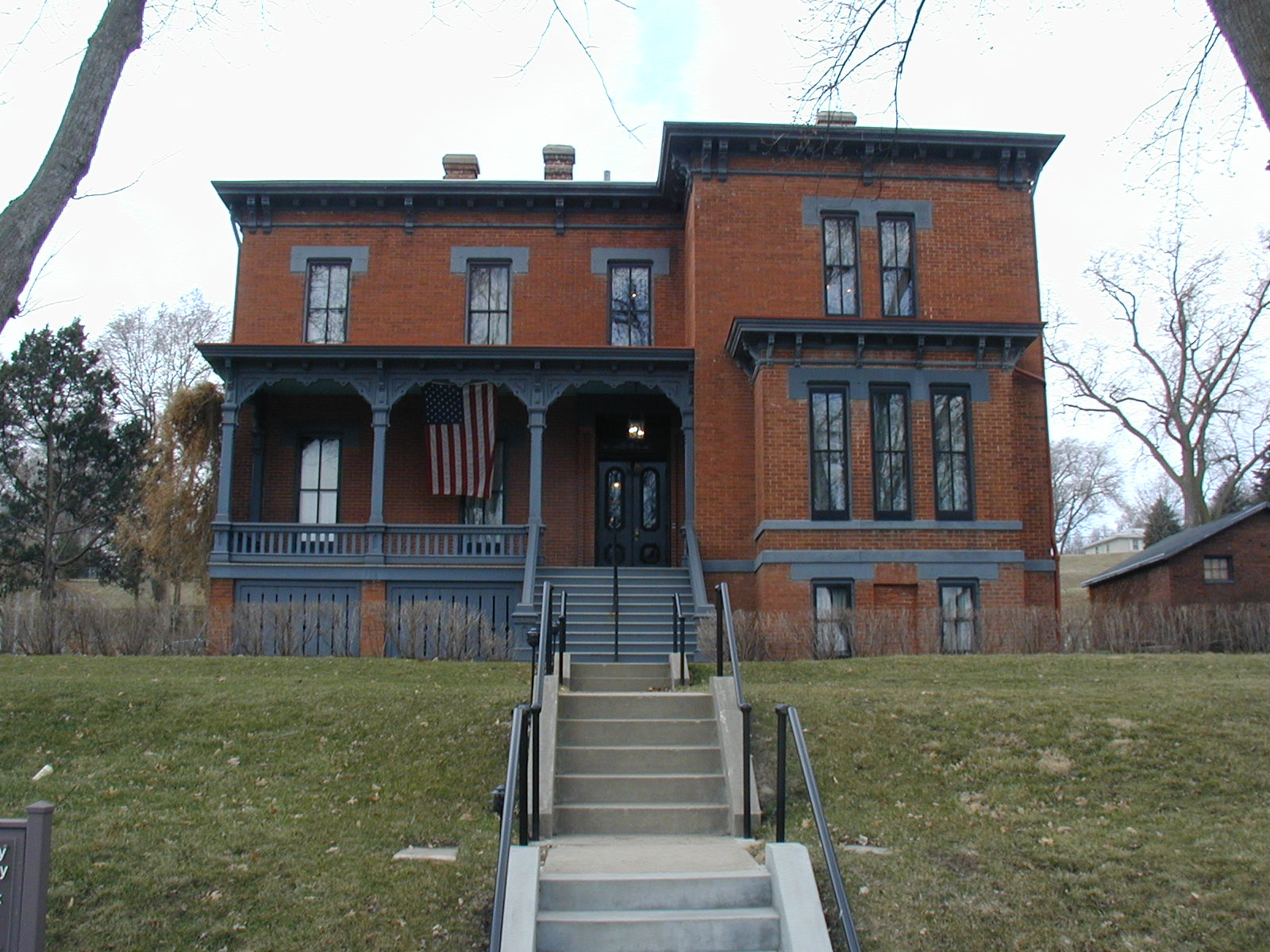
East-facing entrance to Crook House

In 1879, this Italianate-style house was completed for General and Mrs. Crook for the general's continued administration of the Indian Wars. Today, it is used as the museum of the Douglas County Historical Society. It is filled with 19th-century Victorian-style furniture, in addition to military exhibits, and offices of the Douglas County Historical Society. Ornate Victorian-style gardens have been restored on the property. It is located in the middle of Fort Omaha, at 5730 North 30th Street. It was listed on the National Register of Historic Places in 1969.

=== Headquarters building ===
Built in 1879 by the U.S. Army, the Headquarters Building at Fort Omaha first served as the home of the Department of the Platte during the command of General George Crook. In 1881, the headquarters moved back to Downtown Omaha to be closer to the railroads. Today, the building serves as the community college's library.

=== Guardhouse ===
Originally constructed in 1861, the current guardhouse, which sits at Bourke Gate, was built in 1883. Expanded several times, it was designated an Omaha Landmark in 1982.

== Current usage ==
After World War II, Fort Omaha was placed under control of the US Navy. Today, several perimeter facilities are used as a training locations for the Marine Corps Reserve, as well as storage and repair areas for Navy vehicles. The remainder of Fort Omaha houses a campus of the Metropolitan Community College, in addition to the Douglas County Historical Society at the General Crook House and Library Archives Center. More than 25 structures at Fort Omaha are included in the designation of this area as a historic district on the National Register of Historic Places by the National Park Service.

== See also ==
- American observation balloon service in World War I
- History of military ballooning
- Nebraska Territory
- United States Army World War I Flight Training
