= Soviet and Russian airships =

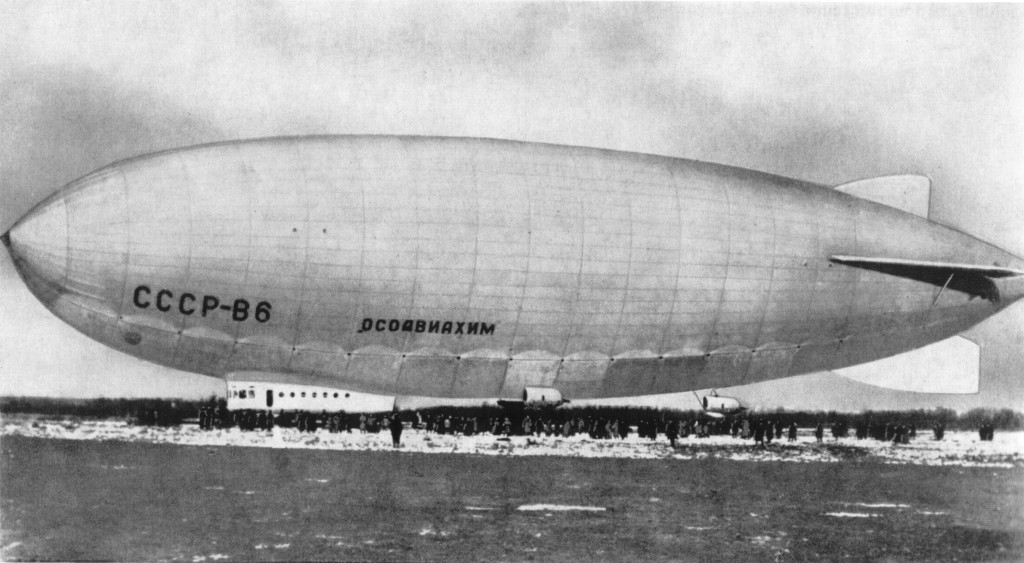
The SSSR-V6 OSOAVIAKhIM built by Nobile was one of the largest Russian airships

This article outlines some of the non-rigid and semi-rigid airships used in or built in Russia and the Soviet Union.

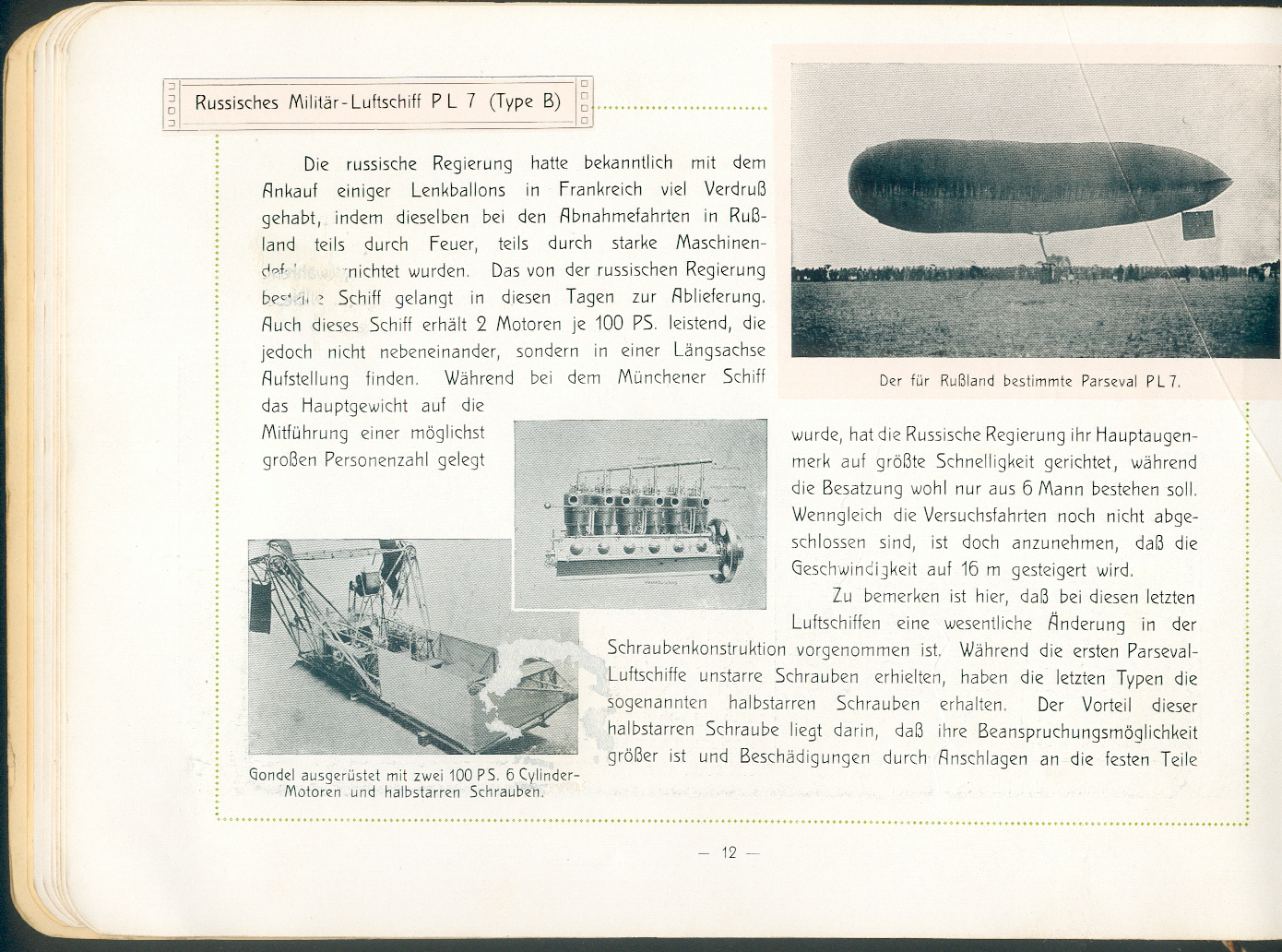
PL 7 Grif built by Luftfahrzeug-GmbH for the Russian military

== Origins of the Soviet Airship Program ==
Like other nations in the early 20th century, Russia began researching and developing its own airships.

Despite heavy investment in industry by the Russians in late 19th and early 20th century, aviation received little in subsidies and relied heavily on foreign technologies. The Imperial Russian Air Service did not come into being until 1912, and though small fixed-wings airplanes were used in World War I, they were limited in their capabilities. Only after the October Revolution in the 1920s did airship enthusiasts begin constructing small non-rigid ships. The first Soviet airship to ever take flight was the Krasnaia Zvezda ('Red Star') which saw its brief maiden voyage on January 3, 1921.

== Soviet Airships under Stalin ==
Airships saw further development under Joseph Stalin during the First Five Year Plan. Impressed by achievements like that of the Germans in constructing the LZ 127 Graf Zeppelin, Stalin wanted to compete with the aircraft of the West. Stalin called for airships that would fly "faster, further and higher" than those of the West. When the German Graf Zeppelin visited Moscow on September 11, 1930, the Soviet newspaper Pravda estimated as many as 100,000 people turned out to see the ship, demonstrating a new Soviet envy and fascination with non-rigid airships. The Graf Zeppelin was a tangible demonstration of the modernity the USSR sought under the First Five Year Plan, and so began a push within the Soviet Union to fund these expensive projects of developing airships.

Public enthusiasm towards airships grew, with supporters viewing them as essential to spreading Socialist culture throughout the USSR and linking disconnected parts of the country together. By January 1931, postcards were issued bearing the expressions "Everyone Must Participate in the Construction of Soviet Dirigibles," "The Dirigible 'Klim Voroshilov' Must Fly Above the Soviet Land' and "Above the Land of the Soviets Must Fly Soviet Dirigibles." In May 1931, five postage stamps were issued with images of Soviet airships connecting the world and flying over the Kremlin.

== Development Under Umberto Nobile ==
In May 1932, Italian aviator and engineer Umberto Nobile was appointed the technical manager of the Soviet airship project where he helped to design some of the USSR's most successful airships. Nobile's role in the Soviet program was kept quiet to maintain the image that it was entirely Soviet led, yet his influence played a substantial role.

From 1932 onwards, the USSR-V1 through USSR-V4 were developed, despite the fact that the main use of Soviet non-rigid airships was celebratory and propaganda flights. During the Second Five Year Plan progress slowed, and the airship program lagged behind.

== Crash of the SSSR-V6 ==
In the late 1930s, work continued at the Soviet state airship construction enterprise Dirizhablestroi with the development of the SSSR-V6 OSOAVIAKhIM. In October 1937, the SSSR-V6 set a world record time-aloft of 130 hours. In February 1938, during a flight to Murmansk the SSSR-V6 encountered poor weather and reduced visibility due to snow and ice. Fearing the ship's altitude was too low, the captain ordered an increase in altitude yet when visibility returned the crew saw they were headed straight into the side of the hill. The crash killed 13 of the 19 crew members dead, one of whom was Sergei Vladimirovich Demin, the husband of the first Soviet woman to command an airship, Vera Mityagina. The accident was covered extensively in the press.

The crash of the SSSR-V6 effectively brought an end to the Soviet airship program. In April 1940, Dirizhablestroi was disestablished and all remaining equipment from the airship projects were scrapped.

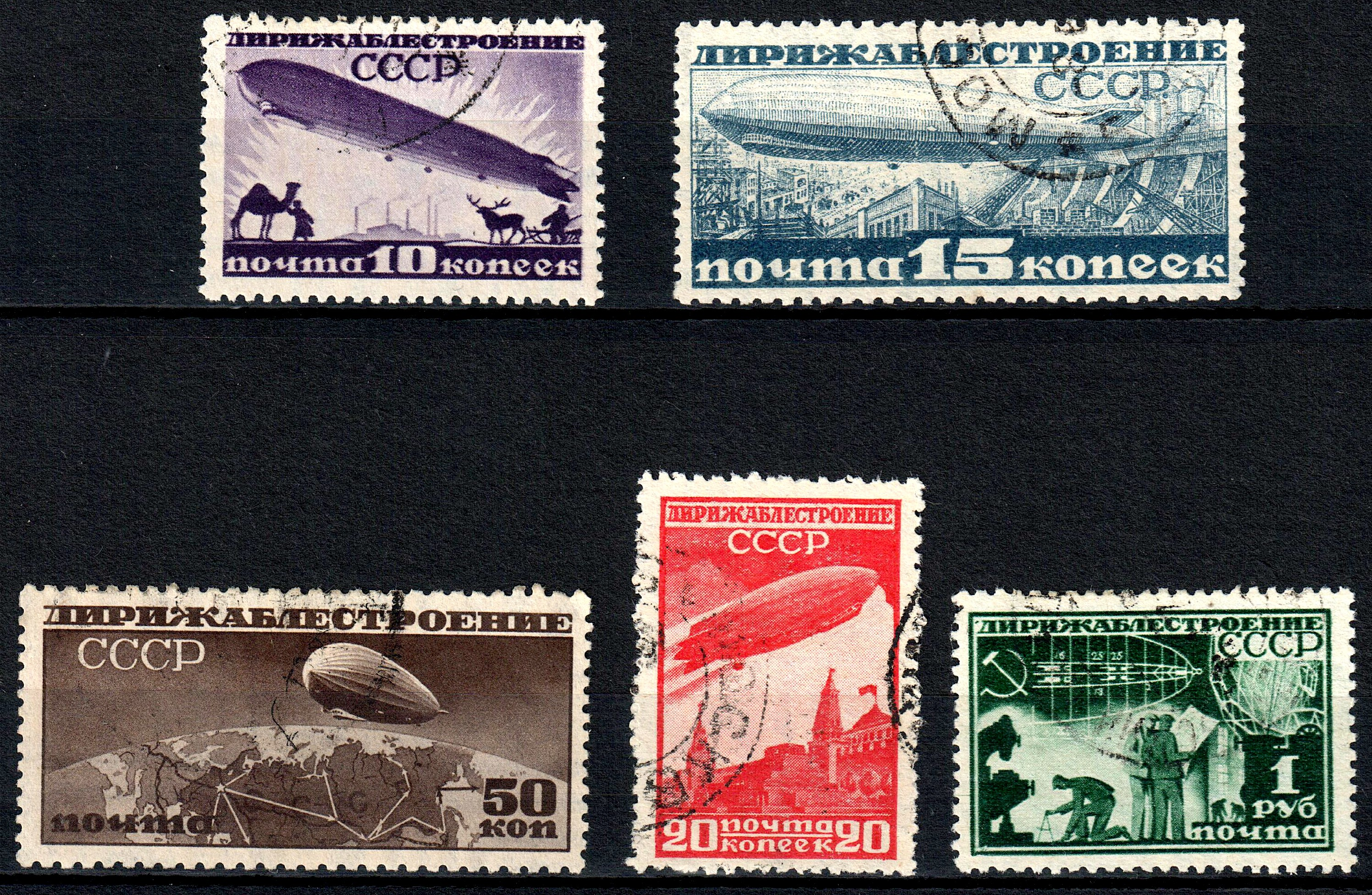
Soviet Airship Stamps from 1931

== Soviet Airships After 1940 ==
In 1944, the airship Pobeda (Russian Победа = Victory) was built and later used to transport cargo, mainly hydrogen gas for balloons used to train parachute jumpers, on short routes from 20 to 500 kilometres long. It crashed on 29 January 1947, killing the whole crew. SSSR-V12 was another airship used for the same purpose, delivering hydrogen gas and cargo.

After World War II, airships were still used for connecting airfields, observation and research. In 1946, the last passenger airship, the "Patriot", entered service but by 1950 regular inland service had ended.

== See also ==
- History of aviation
- Imperial Russian Air Force
Stamps showing Russian airships
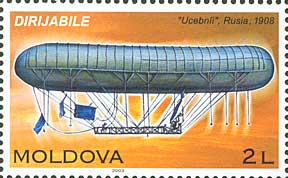
1908 - "Uchebniy" ("training ship"), Russia's first airship

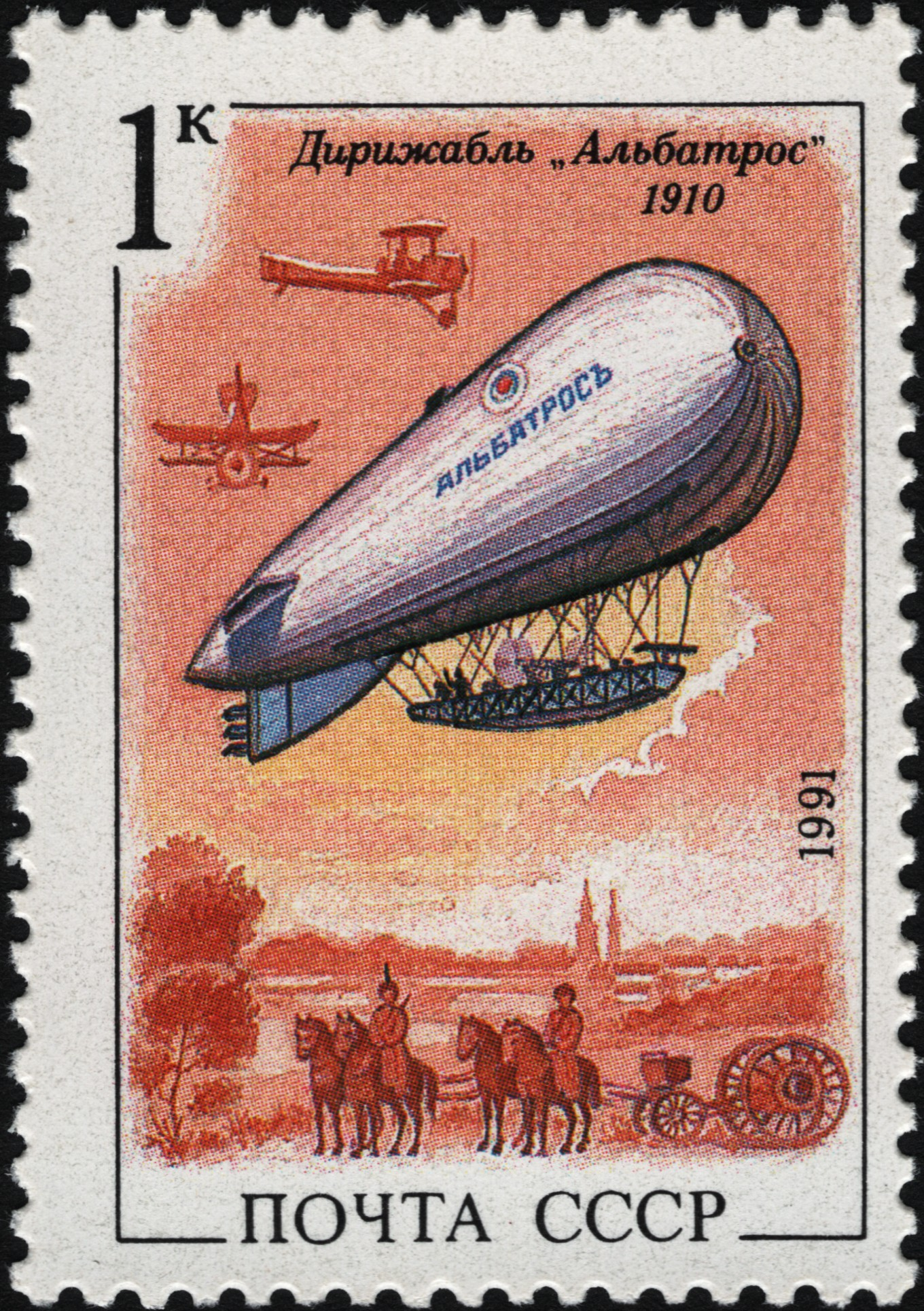
1910 Albatross

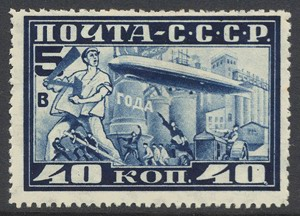
1930 stamp on the first five-year plan

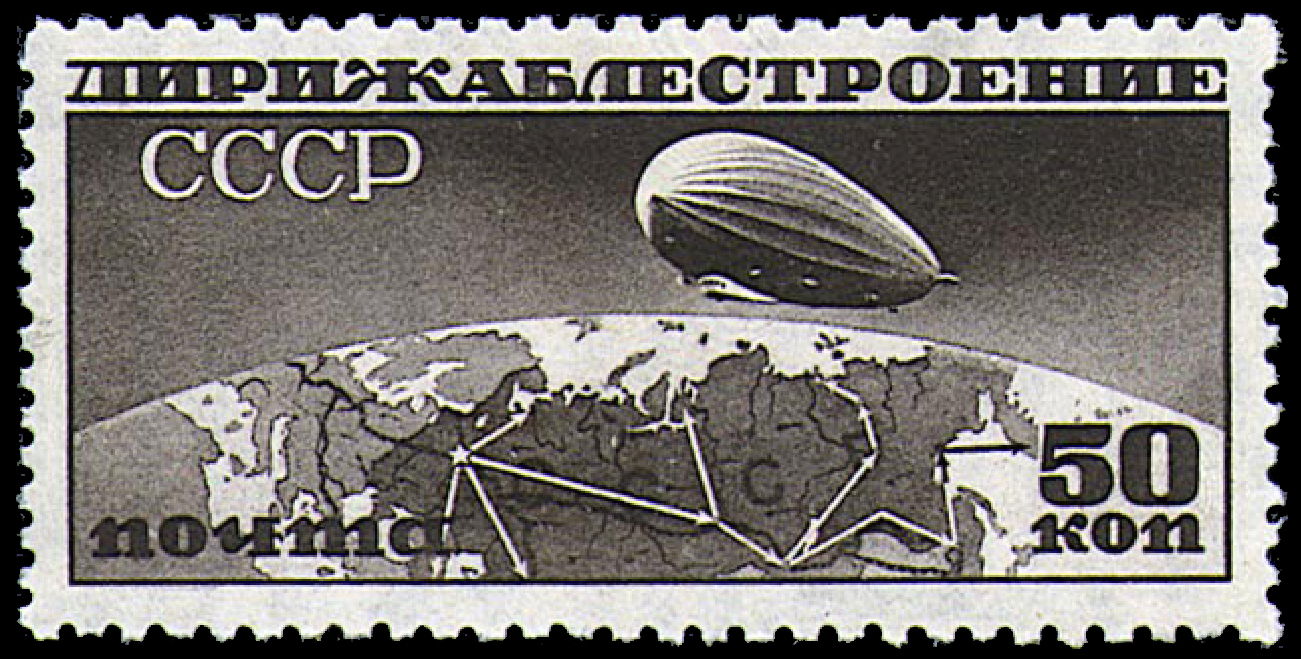
1931 stamp on the building of Russian airships

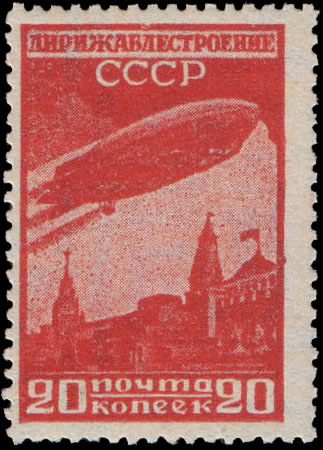
1931 stamp on airship building; Red Square, Lenin's Mausoleum

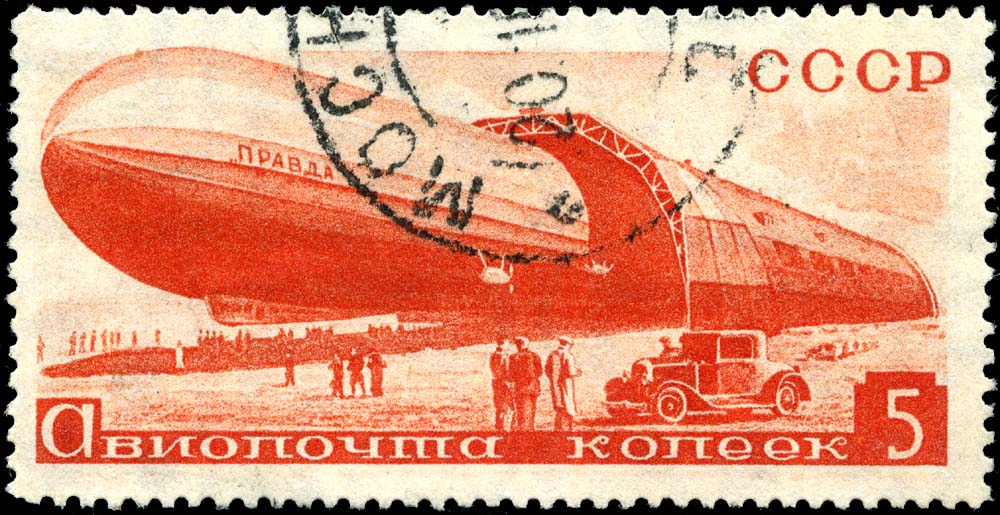
1934 Pravda
