= Fiat S76 Record =

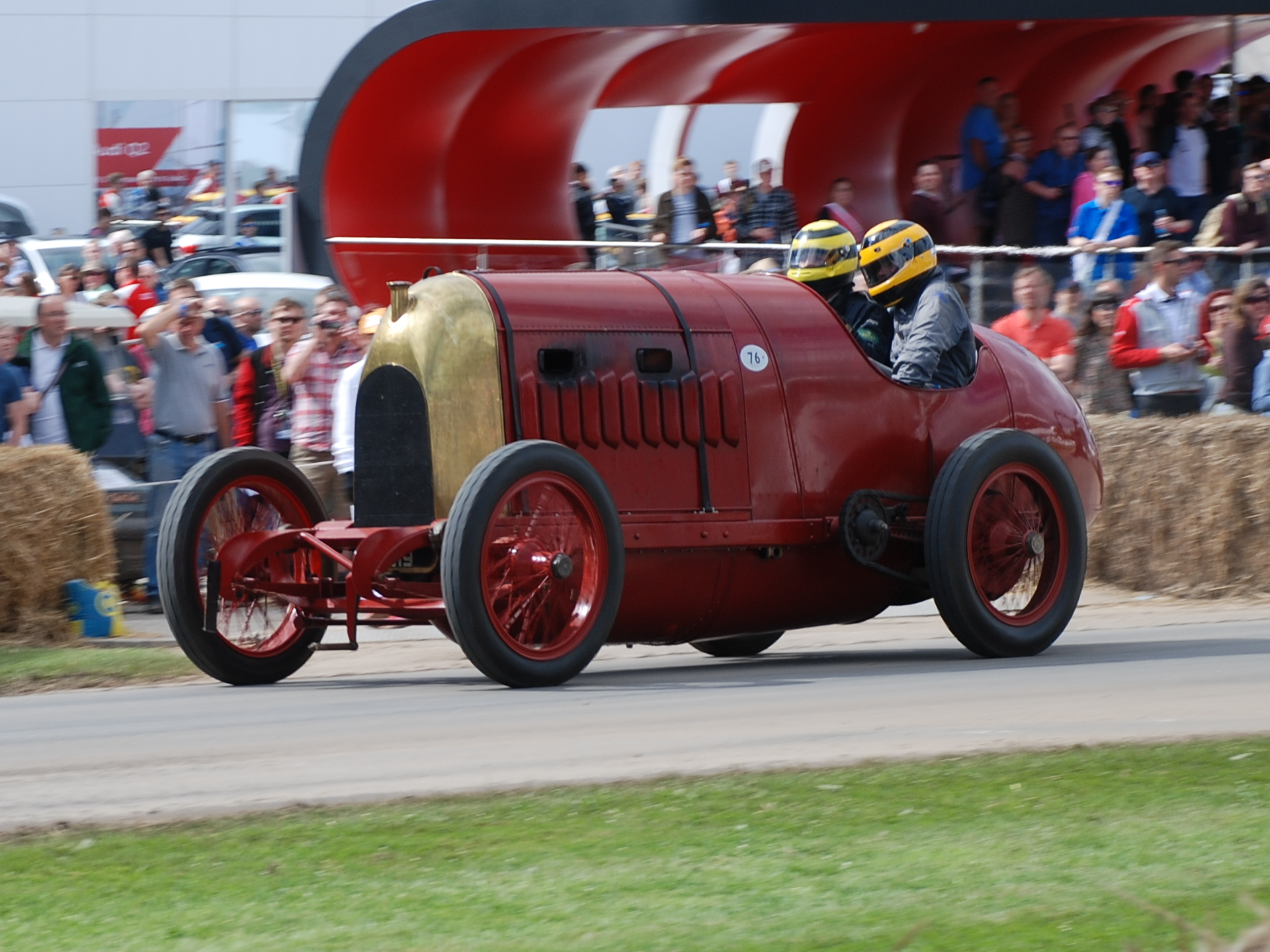
- Goodwood Festival Of Speed - 2016 Goodwood House England

Overview
- Manufacturer: Fiat
- Production: 1910, 2 built (1 dismantled by Fiat)

Body and chassis
- Class: Land speed record vehicle

Powertrain
- Engine: 28,353 cc (1,730 cu in) Fiat Type S.76 Inline 4 engine
- Power output: 290 hp (216 kW); 2,000 lb⋅ft (2,712 N⋅m)

Dimensions
- Wheelbase: 3,700 mm (145.7 in)
- Length: 3,750 mm (147.6 in)
- Width: 1,300 mm (51.2 in)
- Height: 1,750 mm (68.9 in)
- Kerb weight: 1,650 kg (3,638 lb)

Chronology
- Predecessor: Fiat S74
- Successor: Fiat S57A/14B Corsa

The Fiat S76, later also known as Fiat 300 HP Record and nicknamed "The Beast of Turin", is a race car built in 1910 by the Italian company Fiat specifically to beat the land speed records held in those years by the Blitzen Benz. Its 28,353 cc displacement engine, intended for airships like Forlanini, delivered 290 hp. Only two examples were built.

== Technical specifications ==
The S76 had a 4-cylinder engine with a displacement of 28,353 cc (1,730.2 cu in) (190 mm × 250 mm, 7.48in × 9.84in), providing 290 metric horsepower (210 kW) at 1400 rpm, 4 valves (3 valves in the airship engine) starting with trembler coil, 2 spark plugs per cylinder (3 spark plugs in the airship engine), ignition with high voltage magneto BOSCH type DR4/4, water cooling, transmission with chain drive, axle suspension rigid with front and rear leaf springs (rear longitudinal struts), and 4-speed gearbox plus reverse gear.

The radiator design of this "prototype" for records was reused by Fiat for subsequent road models.

== History ==
The first S76 was constructed in 1910 and kept by Fiat. It was tested by Felice Nazzaro, who considered the 38 short cwt (1,700 kg) car 'uncontrollable'. The second S76 was sold by Fiat to Russian Prince Boris Soukhanov, in 1911. Soukhanov originally hired Pietro Bordino to drive the car on the Brooklands motor racing circuit in Weybridge, Surrey, England. Bordino refused to drive the car faster than 90 mph. It was later driven at the Saltburn Sands beach near Redcar & Cleveland, England, where it reached speeds of 116 mph (187 km/h). Soukhanov then hired Belgian driver Arthur Duray in a December 1913 land speed record attempt at Ostende, Belgium. Duray managed a one-way speed of 132.27 mph (213 km/h), but was unable to complete a return run within the hour allotted. The Blitzen Benz had been faster in 1911 at Daytona Beach, hence the Beast of Turin was granted an unofficial title of fastest car in Europe, but it was not an official record.

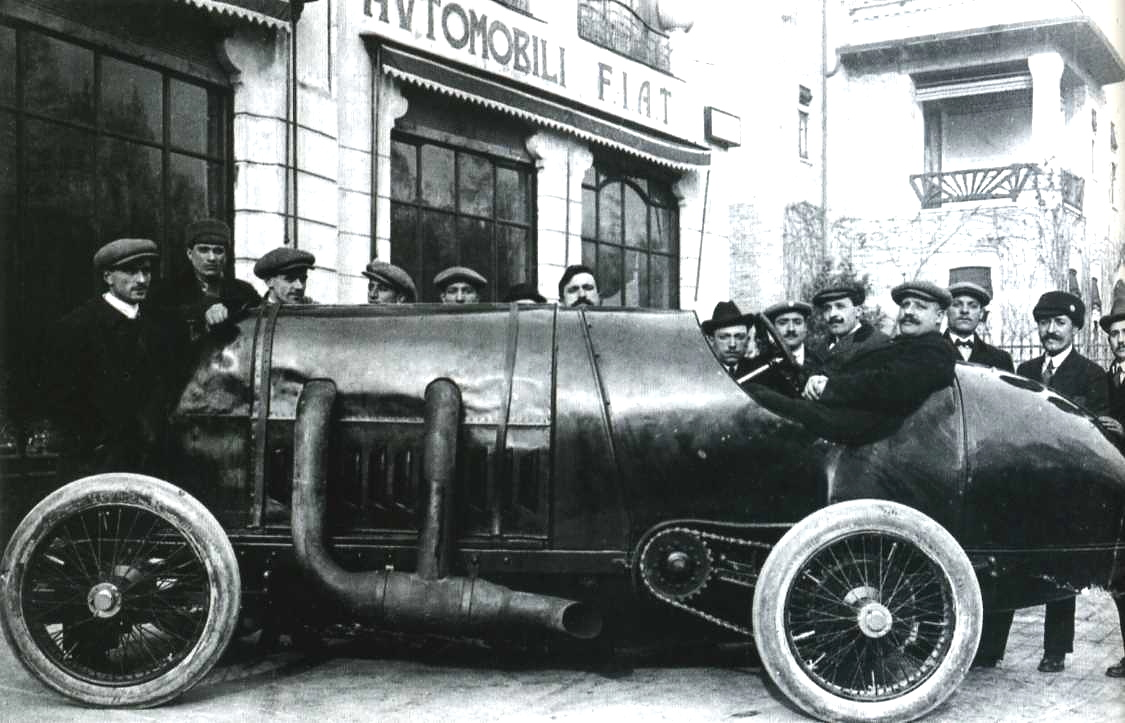
Fiat S76 Record No. 2, in front of Fiat factory, Turin, 1911

Following the First World War, the first S76 built was dismantled by Fiat at the end of 1919. Soukhanov's S76, missing its engine, ended up in Australia, where it was rebuilt and re-powered with a Stutz engine. The S76's career ended when it was crashed at Armadale in the early 1920s while practicing for a race to the coast, although this is the subject of some debate.

After the two car engines built from 1910 and 1911, FIAT built similar engines for airships, changing to 3 valves (two exhaust and one intake) and 3 spark plugs (the car engine had 2 spark plugs) That engine type built from 1912 and 1913 was mounted on Forlanini airships. The last one to survive from the six built is in the Capetti collection of Politecnico di Torino.

=== Restoration ===
Duncan Pittaway obtained an Edwardian Fiat chassis and had it shipped to the UK. After getting, under unclear circumstances, the surviving S76 engine from the sister car, Pittaway started the recreation of the S76. Three major parts of the car needed to be recreated from scratch, including the double chain-drive gearbox, the body and the radiator. All those parts were re-created by referencing original Fiat drawings, and period photographs. In November 2014, Pittaway and his team managed to return the S76 engine to working order: Leonardo Sordi, an Italian Air Force consultant and historic expert of mechanics and magnetos, built a full ignition system (including spark plugs), a full set of engine bearings (white metal shells) and reworked the original crankcase n°2 for realignment of the bench supports, deformed over 100 years. The repair was completed in 2015 and the "Beast of Turin" was displayed and driven for the first time in almost a century at the 2015 Goodwood Festival of Speed on June 23–26.

It has since been displayed and competed at the Chateau Impney Hill Climb during 11–12 July 2015 and the Prescott Speed Hill Climb in May 2016.

In 2019 the Italian authorities started an investigation, as they have ascertained that the S76 engine mounted on the "Beast of Turin" was originally kept in the Antonio Capetti Collection of the Polytechnic of Turin: the power unit was loaned to Mr. Pittaway in charge of research and restoration, but the Antonio Capetti Collection discovered after some years that the car had been returned with a non-functional replica block.

== See also ==
- Fiat Mephistopheles

== Sources ==
- What a 28.5-liter LSR engine sounds like firing up for the first time in 100 years - Chris Bruce, Autoblog, 02/12/2014
- - Dopo 100 anni risorge la Fiat S76 300 HP Record
- After a 100-year slumber, the Beast of Turin comes to life - Kurt Ernst, Hemmings, 12/04/2014
- The Monster is Stirring – The Rebirth of a 1729 Cubic Inch S.76 Fiat The Old Motor, 5/03/2014
- Kozak, Graham (March 15, 2015). "The Beast of Turin awakens: Fiat S76 driven for the first time in a century -- and it's very, very angry". Autoweek.
- The Beast Of Turin Captivates Crowds at 2015's Chateau Impney Hill Climb 24 March 2016
- The Monster The Old Motor 24 March 2011
- Merchandise for fans of the fire breathing monster Fiat S76, "Beast of Turin"
