= Fiat S.76 engine =

FIAT S.76 engine

Overview
- Manufacturer: Fiat
- Production: 1910-1911

Layout
- Configuration: I4
- Displacement: 28.353 L (1,730.2 cu in)
- Cylinder bore: 190 mm (7.48 in)
- Piston stroke: 250 mm (9.84 in)
- Valvetrain: 16-valve, SOHC, four-valves per cylinder

Combustion
- Fuel system: Weber Carburetor
- Fuel type: Gasoline
- Oil system: Dry sump
- Cooling system: Water-cooled

Output
- Power output: 290 hp (216 kW; 294 PS)
- Torque output: 2,000 lb⋅ft (2,712 N⋅m)

The engine used in the Fiat S.76 land speed record vehicle is a large-displacement, four-cylinder engine, designed and developed by Fiat, in 1910.

== Overview ==
The S.76 uses a 4-cylinder engine, with a displacement of 28,353 cm^{3} (1,730.2 in^{3}) (190 mm × 250 mm)(7.48in x 9.84in), providing 290 metric horsepower (210 kW) at 1400 rpm, 4 valves (3 valves the airship engine) starting with trembler coil, 2 spark plugs per cylinder (3 spark plug the aeroship engine), ignition with high voltage magneto BOSCH type DR4/4, and water cooling.

After the 2 car engine was built from 1910 and 1911, FIAT built a similar engine for an airship, changing the valves to 3 (two exhausts and one intake) and the spark plugs to 3 (the car engine had 2 spark plugs) That engine was built from 1912 to 1913, and was used on Forlanini airships.

In November 2014, Pittaway and a team of motorists managed to return the S76 engine to working order including Leonardo E. M. Sordi an Italian Air Force consultant and historic expert of mechanics and magneto, to rebuild a full ignition system (including spark plugs), full set of engine bearings whit shell and white metal, and rework the original crankcase n°2 for realignment of the bench supports, deformed in over 100 years of history; although more work was needed before the car was fully operational. This was completed in 2015 and the "Beast of Turin" was displayed and driven for the first time in almost a century at the Goodwood Festival of Speed between 23 and 26 June 2015.

== Applications ==
- Fiat S76 Record
