= Umberto Nobile =

Italian explorer and engineer

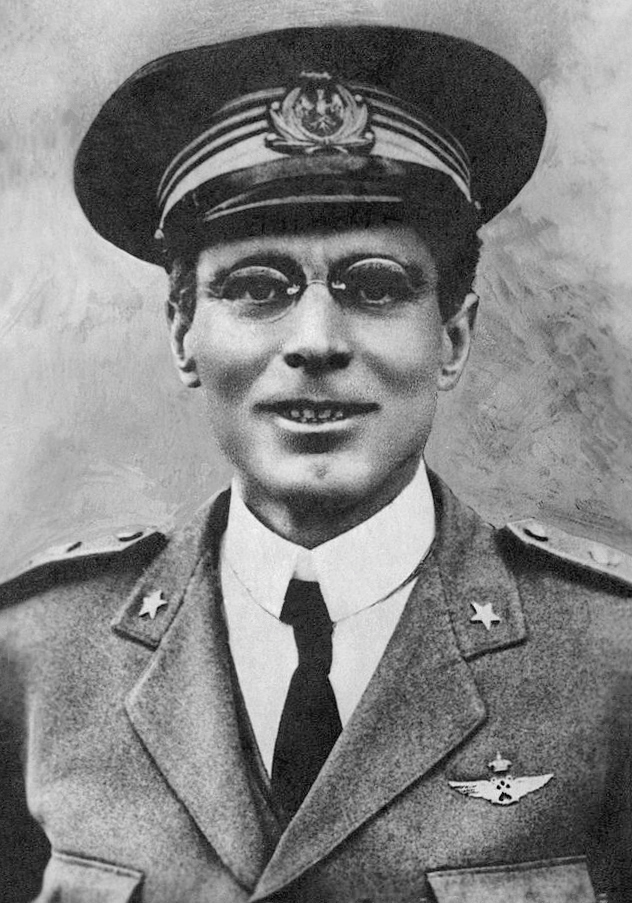
- Umberto Nobile c. 1923

Member of the Italian Constituent Assembly
- In office 25 June 1946 – 31 January 1948
- Parliamentary group: Communist
- Constituency: Lazio

Personal details
- Born: 21 January 1885 Lauro, Italy
- Died: 30 July 1978 (aged 93) Rome, Italy
- Resting place: Cimitero Flaminio, Rome
- Party: Independent
- Spouses: Carlotta Ferraiolo (m. 1916; died 1934); Gertrude Stolp (m. 1959); (1917-1999)
- Children: Maria
- Education: University of Naples Federico II
- Occupation: Aviator, university professor
- Known for: Polar expeditions of Norge and Italia
- Committees: Committee for the Constitution
- Awards: Order of Merit of the Italian Republic; Military Order of Italy; Order of the Golden Kite (Japan); Order of Saint Olav (Norway); Congressional Gold Medal (U.S.)

Military service
- Allegiance: Italy
- Branch/service: Royal Italian Air Force
- Years of service: 1911-1929 (Note: Nobile resigned from the Air Force on 5 March 1929 after an inquiry commission blamed him for the Italia accident. In 1945 he was rehabilitated and reinstated with his prior rank.)
- Rank: Generale di divisione area

Umberto Nobile (Italian pronunciation: [umˈbɛrto ˈnɔːbile]; 21 January 1885 – 30 July 1978) was an Italian aviator, aeronautical engineer and Arctic explorer.

Nobile was a developer and promoter of semi-rigid airships in the years between the two World Wars. He is primarily remembered for designing and piloting the airship Norge, which may have been the first aircraft to reach the North Pole, and which was indisputably the first to fly across the polar ice cap from Europe to America. Nobile also designed and flew the Italia, a second polar airship; this second expedition ended in a deadly crash and provoked an international rescue effort, some participants of which also lost their lives or went missing and presumed dead.

== Early career ==
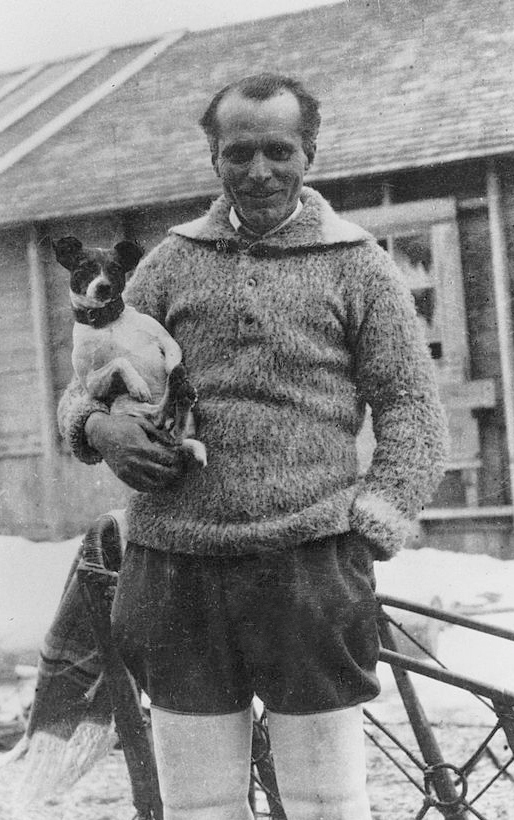
Umberto Nobile and his dog Titina in 1926

Umberto Nobile was born in Lauro, in the southern Italian province of Avellino, into a family of small landowners. His father Vincenzo, a civil servant, belonged to the cadet branch of an aristocratic family that had been stripped of its titles after the Italian unification over their continuing loyalty to the deposed Bourbons, and which had adopted the Nobile surname for that reason.

After graduating from the University of Naples in 1908 with a degree in industrial engineering, Nobile was hired by the Italian state railways. In 1911 his interests turned to the field of aeronautical engineering and he enrolled into a course offered by the Italian Army's Engineers Corps. During World War I he served as a military engineer, working at the Military Factory for Aeronautical Construction and Experience (Stabilimento Militare di Costruzioni ed Esperienze Aeronautiche) in Rome. During this time he designed airships designed for anti-submarine reconnaissance, 15 of which would be built after the war, and taught courses for aspiring officers. In 1918 he designed the first Italian-made parachute. He was director of the Factory from 1919 until 1927.

He also lectured at the University of Naples, obtained his test pilot's license and wrote the textbook Elementi di Aerodinamica (Elements of Aerodynamics).

During this time, Nobile focused on designing medium-sized, semi-rigid airships, convinced they were superior to non-rigid and rigid designs. One of the Military Factory's first projects in this direction was the T-34, which was designed for a trans-Atlantic crossing. The United States Army purchased the airship in late 1921 and commissioned it as the Roma. In February, 1922, the hydrogen-inflated Roma crashed and exploded in Norfolk, Virginia, after hitting high-tension power lines, killing 34 in what was the worst aviation disaster in the United States at the time.

That same year, Nobile worked with Gianni Caproni on the design the first Italian all-metal aircraft, the Caproni Ca.73, and traveled to the United States to work as a consultant for Goodyear in Akron, Ohio. In 1923, Nobile began the design of a new airship, the N-1, which was built for the United States, Spain, Argentina and Japan. He would travel himself to Japan in January 1927 to supervise the assembly of the N-3 airship, which had been sold to the Japanese Imperial Navy, and personally took part in several test flights. Nobile later claimed that during this time he faced professional hostility from some high-profile members of the Air Force establishment, including Italo Balbo, who had some of the best workers of the Military Factory dismissed on suspicion of being anti-fascists, obstructed plans for a Rome-Rio de Janeiro flight, and held back support for polar expeditions.

== Polar expeditions ==
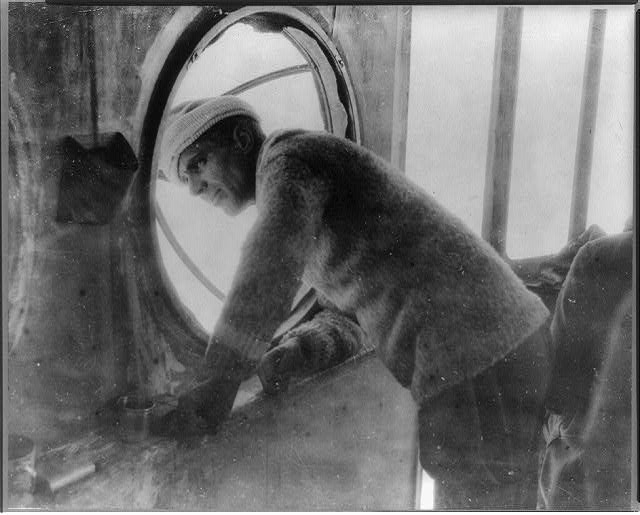
Umberto Nobile, commanding the Norge, looks from the window of the control car, as the airship departs from the base at Spitsbergen

=== Norge ===
In late 1925, Norwegian explorer Roald Amundsen sought out Nobile to collaborate on a flight to the North Pole – still at that time an unachieved goal for aviators – using an airship. Amundsen had previously in early 1925 flown to within 150 nautical miles (280 km) of the North Pole, in a pair of Italian-built Dornier Wal flying boats along with the American millionaire-adventurer Lincoln Ellsworth and the pilot Hjalmar Riiser-Larsen, but their planes were forced to land near 88 degrees North, and the six men were trapped on the ice for 30 days.

The Italian State Airship Factory, which had built Nobile's N-1, made it available for the expedition 29 March 1926. Amundsen insisted in the contract that Nobile should be the pilot and that five of the crew should be Italian; Amundsen named the airship Norge (Norway). On 14 April the airship left Italy for Leningrad in Russia with stops at Pulham (England) and Oslo. On its way towards its Arctic jumping-off point, Ny-Ålesund (Kings Bay) at Vestspitsbergen, Svalbard (belonging to Norway) it also made a stop at the airship mast at Vadsø (Northern Norway).

On 29 April 1926, Amundsen was dismayed at the arrival of Richard E. Byrd's American expedition, which also aimed to reach the Pole. On 9 May, after Byrd and Floyd Bennett departed in their Fokker F-VII and returned less than 16 hours later claiming to have overflown the Pole, Amundsen was one of the first to congratulate them. The Norge crew pressed ahead with their flight. On 11 May 1926, the Norge expedition left Svalbard. Fifteen and a half hours later the ship flew over the Pole and landed two days later in Teller, Alaska; strong winds had made the planned landing at Nome, Alaska, impossible.

In retrospect, however, it is possible that the Norge crew actually achieved their aim of being the first to overfly the Pole; Byrd's 9 May flight, acclaimed for decades as the prestigious first Polar flyover, has since been subjected to several credibility challenges, including the discovery of Byrd's flight diary, which showed that navigational data in his official report was inconsistent with Byrd's own writings.

The Norge "Rome to Nome" flight was acclaimed as another great milestone in flight, but disagreement soon erupted between Nobile (designer and pilot), and Amundsen (expedition leader, observer and passenger) on the flight, as to who deserved greater credit for the expedition. The controversy was exacerbated by Mussolini's Fascist government, which trumpeted the genius of Italian engineering and exploration; Nobile was ordered to make a speaking tour of the U.S., further alienating Amundsen and the Norwegians.

=== Italia ===
Despite the controversy, Nobile continued to maintain good relations with other polar scientists, and he started planning a new expedition, this time fully under Italian control. Nobile's company managed to sell the N-3 airship to Japan; however, relations between Nobile and his competitors in the fascist government were hostile, and he and his staff were subjected to threats and intimidation. Nobile's popularity with the public meant he was, for the moment, safe from direct attack. When the plans for his next expedition were announced, Italo Balbo is said to have commented, "Let him go, for he cannot possibly come back to bother us anymore."

The Italia, nearly identical to the Norge, was slowly completed and equipped for Polar flight during 1927–28. Part of the difficulty was in raising private funding to cover the costs of the expedition, which finally was financed by the city of Milan; the Italian government limited its direct participation to providing the airship and sending the aging steamer Città di Milano as a support vessel to Svalbard, under the command of Giuseppe Romagna.

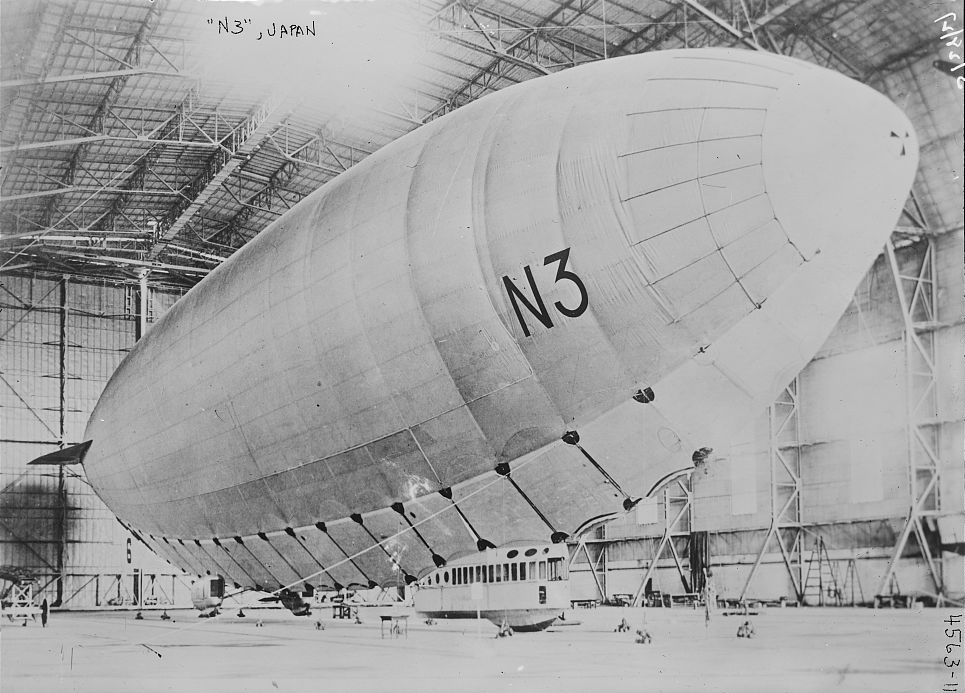
"N3," Japan at Kasumigaura, Japan on 24 May 1927

This time the airship used a German hangar at Stolp en route to Svalbard and the mast at Vadsø (Northern Norway). On 23 May 1928, after an outstanding 69-hour-long flight to the Siberian group of Arctic islands, the Italia commenced its flight to the North Pole with Nobile as both pilot and expedition leader. On 24 May, the ship reached the Pole and had already turned back toward Svalbard when it ran into a storm. On 25 May, the Italia crashed onto the pack ice less than 30 kilometres north of Nordaustlandet (eastern part of Svalbard). Of the 16 men in the crew, ten were thrown onto the ice as the gondola was smashed; the remaining six crewmen were trapped in the buoyant superstructure as it ascended skyward due to loss of the gondola. One of the ten men on the ice, Pomella, died from the impact; Nobile suffered a broken arm, broken leg, broken rib and head injury; Cecioni suffered two badly broken legs; Malmgren suffered a severe shoulder injury and suspected injury to a kidney; and Zappi had several broken ribs.

The crew managed to salvage several items from the crashed airship gondola, including a radio transceiver, a tent which they later painted red for maximum visibility, and, critically, boxes of food and survival equipment which engineer Ettore Arduino had the presence of mind to throw onto the ice before he and his five companions were carried off to their deaths by the wrecked but still airborne airship envelope and keel. As the days passed, the drifting sea ice took the survivors towards Foyn and Broch islands.

A few days after the crash, the Swedish meteorologist Finn Malmgren and Nobile's second and third in command Mariano and Zappi decided to leave the immobile group and march towards land. Malmgren, who was injured, weakened and reportedly still depressed over his meteorological advice that he felt contributed to the crash, asked his two Italian companions to continue without him. These two were picked up several weeks later by the Soviet icebreaker "Krasin". However, there were persistent rumors that Malmgren was killed and cannibalized by Zappi and Mariano.

A "highly imaginative, fictionalized version" of these events was made into the 1969 film The Red Tent. The film was an Italian/Soviet co-production and featured Peter Finch as Nobile, Sean Connery as Amundsen and Hardy Krüger as Lundborg.

=== Controversial search and rescue ===
In the wake of the crash, a collection of nations, including the Soviet Union, Norway, Sweden, Finland, and Italy, launched the first polar air and sea rescue effort. Privately owned ships which had been chartered by polar scientists and explorers also participated. Even Roald Amundsen put aside his past differences with Nobile and boarded a French seaplane and headed for the rescue headquarters; this plane disappeared between Tromsø and Svalbard, and though a pontoon from the craft was later found, the bodies of Amundsen, the pilot René Guilbaud and the four others on board were not.

After a month of privation for the Italia survivors, the first rescue plane, a Swedish Air Force Fokker C.V-E ski plane, piloted by Lieutenant Einar Lundborg, with Lieutenant Schyberg as observer, landed near the crash site. Nobile had prepared a detailed evacuation plan, with the most seriously wounded man (the heavy built mechanic Cecioni) at the top of the list and himself as number 4, with the navigator (Viglieri) and the radio operator (Biagi) as respectively no. 5 and 6. However, Lundborg refused to take anyone but Nobile. He argued that the plane could only take one survivor and the other seriously injured man was so heavy Lundborg was unsure he could take off. Nobile was airlifted to Søre Russøya, base camp of Swedish and Finnish air rescue efforts. When Lundborg returned alone to pick up a second survivor he crashed his plane on landing, and was trapped with the other five.

Eventually, Nobile reached the Città di Milano, where, he later said, he was dismayed at the incompetence he found. His attempts to help co-ordinate the international rescue effort were blocked, and when he threatened to leave he was placed under virtual arrest by Captain Romagna. His telegrams to the survivors still on the ice, as well as to various people involved in the rescue, were heavily censored. It was wrongly reported in Fascist Italian newspapers that his own evacuation was an obvious sign of cowardice. After 48 days on the ice floe, the last five men of his crew were rescued by the Soviet icebreaker Krasin. Nobile insisted that he wanted to continue the search for the six crew who were swept away by the airship when it disintegrated, but he was ordered back to Rome with the others.

Two hundred thousand cheering Italians met Nobile and his crew on arrival in Rome on 31 July. This show of popularity was unexpected by Nobile's detractors, who had been seeding the foreign and domestic press with accusations against him. An aggrieved Nobile was not shy about his complaints; in an interview with Benito Mussolini, he offended the dictator by detailing his grievances at length. The official inquiry and the embarrassment over the crash gave Nobile's enemies the chance they were looking for: blame for the disaster was placed on his shoulders, and he was accused of abandoning his men on the ice – charges he would spend the rest of his life trying to dispel. In protest of the findings, General Nobile resigned from the air force in March 1929.

== Later life ==
In July 1931, Nobile took part in the expedition of the Soviet icebreaker Malygin to Franz Josef Land and the northern Kara Sea. He moved to the Soviet Union in 1932, and lived there for nearly five years to work on the Soviet semi-rigid airship program. Few details of the program have been documented, but Nobile supervised the manufacturing of three airships, including SSSR-V6 OSOAVIAKhIM, and designed two others that were intended for military use.

Nobile returned to Italy in December 1936, after he had been appointed as a member of the Pontificial Academy of Sciences. For a few months he also worked on aviation projects with Caproni, including methods to recover from a spin and an aircraft that could carry a MAS (motorboat) or a tank.

Due to the hostility of the Fascist government, Nobile moved to the United States in 1939 to teach at Lewis University (at the time called Lewis Holy Name School of Aeronautics due to its aviation-focused curriculum) in Romeoville and in Chicago. He was permitted to remain in the US after Italy declared war on the United States, but declined the offer of US citizenship and opted to return to Europe in May, 1942. Following a brief stay in Rome he moved to Spain, where he remained until Mussolini was deposed, after which he made his definite return to his native country.

In 1945, the Italian air force cleared Nobile of all charges related to the Italia crash, and not only reinstated him at his former rank as major general, but promoted him to lieutenant general and awarded him back pay dating to 1928. The following year he was elected to the Constituent Assembly as independent candidate in the lists of the Italian Communist Party. In that capacity he was part of the 75-member Committee that produced the main draft of the Italian Constitution.

In 1948, Nobile returned to teaching at the University of Naples, where he studied and taught aeronautical and astronautical subjects. He continued giving interviews and writing books and articles until his death, without managing to fully sway public opinion and some military experts of his version of the events of his polar expeditions.

Nobile died in Rome on 30 July 1978, aged 93, shortly after the celebrations for the fiftieth anniversary of his two expeditions. The Italian Air Force Museum at Vigna di Valle has a large permanent exhibition on his achievements. A museum in his hometown of Lauro collects his documents and memorabilia.

== Personal life ==
Nobile was married to Carlotta Ferraiolo, daughter of a wealthy notary from Teano and ten years his senior, from 1916 until her death in 1934. Together they had a daughter. In 1959 he remarried to Gertrude Stolp, a German woman whom he had met in Spain in 1943 and who later became chief librarian at the headquarters of the Food and Agriculture Organization in Rome.

== See also ==
- The Red Tent, a 1969 film about the rescue effort
- Titina (film), a 2022 animated film about Nobile's polar expeditions.
- List of explorers
- Timeline of hydrogen technologies
- Enrico Forlanini – another Italian designer of semi-rigid airships
- Spitsbergen Airship Museum
- Nobile (crater)
