= O-1 (airship) =

1919 semi-rigid airship by SCDA

General information
- Type: Semi-rigid Airship
- Manufacturer: SCDA
- Primary user: United States Navy
- Number built: 1

History
- Introduction date: First US flight 16 September 1919
- First flight: 27 March 1919 at Ciampino, Italy
- Retired: Late 1921 or early 1922

The SCDA O-1 was an Italian semi-rigid airship, the only true semi-rigid airship to serve with the United States Navy.

== Operational service ==
The O-1 was ordered from Stabilimento Costruzioni Dirigibili ed Aerostati (SCDA) by the United States Navy. Its first flight was made at Ciampino, Italy, on March 27, 1919. Following tests, it was sent from Genoa, Italy, leaving on May 24, 1919. It was sent to Akron for study and was then erected at the airship base at Cape May, New Jersey. The O-1 first flew in the USA on September 16, 1919. While operating from Cape May, the O-1 lost all power on a landing approach and was blown to near Pennsville, New Jersey where the crew managed to land it. The O-1 was eventually returned to service and while on temporary duty at Hampton Roads the O-1 was used to launch gliders designed to be anti-aircraft targets. The date the O-1 was scrapped is not known, but was probably in the winter of 1921–22.

== Operators ==
United States

- United States Navy

== Specifications O-1 ==
- Crew: 3
- Volume: 127,000 cu ft
- Length: 177.8 ft
- Diameter: 35.4 ft
- Gross lift: 9,125 lbs
- Empty weight: 5,850 lbs
- Useful lift: 3,290 lbs
- Keel: Articulated steel
- Powerplant: Two, Colombo, 125 hp
