= Semi-rigid airship =

Lighter-than-air aircraft

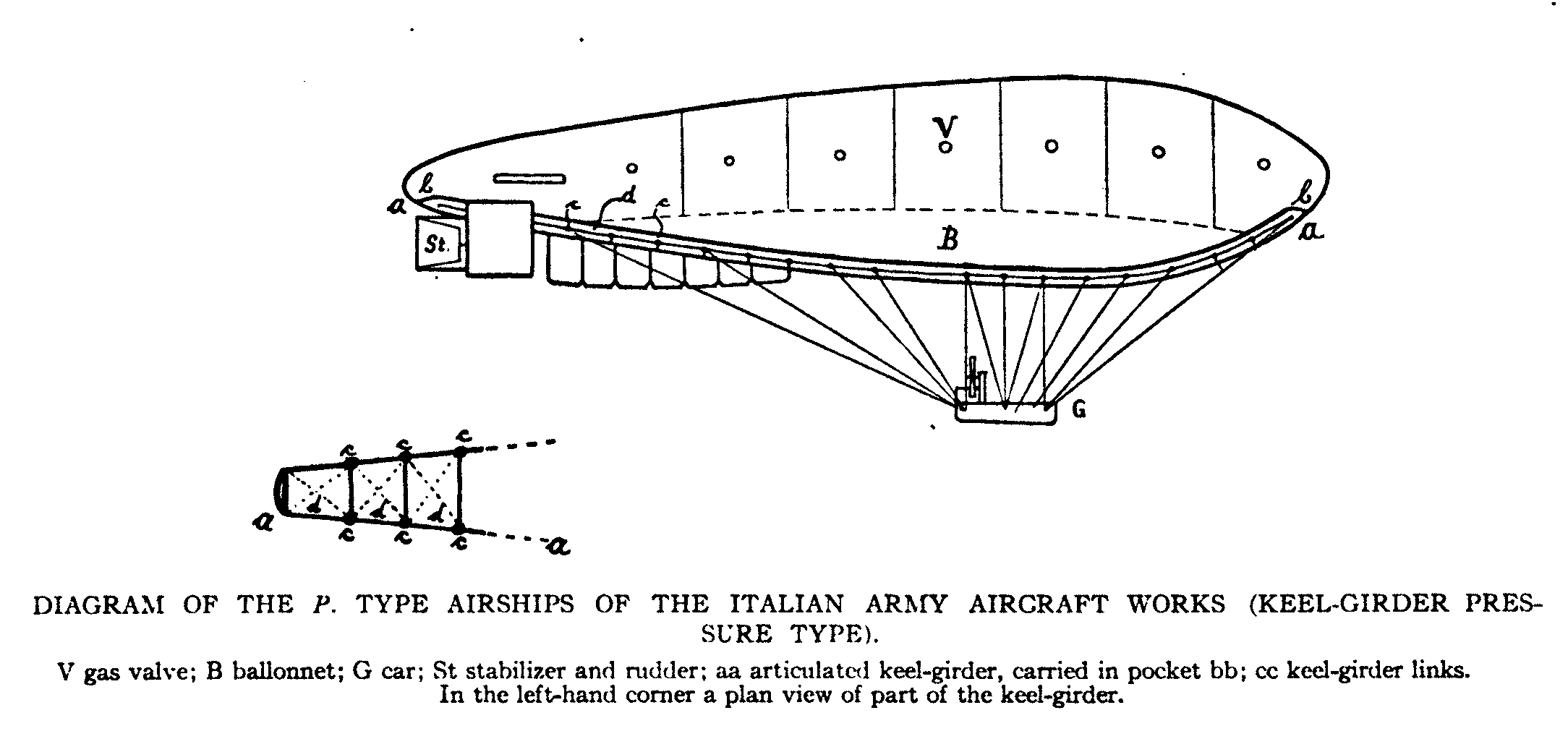
Internal structure of semi-rigid airship

A semi-rigid airship is an airship which has a stiff keel or truss supporting the main envelope along its length. The keel may be partially flexible or articulated and may be located inside or outside the main envelope. The outer shape of the airship is maintained by gas pressure, as with the non-rigid "blimp". Semi-rigid dirigibles were built in significant quantity from the late 19th century but in the late 1930s they fell out of favour along with rigid airships. No more were constructed until the semi-rigid design was revived by the Zeppelin NT in 1997.

Semi-rigid construction is lighter-weight than the outer framework of a rigid airship, while it allows greater loading than a non-rigid type.

== Principle ==
More or less integrally attached to the hull are the gondola, engines and sometimes the empennage (tail). The framework has the task of distributing the suspension loads of these attachments and the lifting gas loads evenly throughout the whole hull's surface and may also partially relieve stresses on the hull during manoeuvres. In early airships which relied on nets, fabric bands, or complicated systems of rope rigging to unite the lifting envelope with the other parts of the ship, semi-rigid construction was able to achieve improvements in weight, aerodynamic, and structural performance. The boundary between semi-rigid and non-rigid airships is vague. Especially with small types, it is unclear whether the structure is merely an extended gondola or a proper structural keel.

As in non-rigid airships, the hull's aerodynamic shape is maintained by an overpressure of the gas inside and light framework at the nose and tail. Changes in volume of the lifting gas are balanced using ballonets (air-filled bags). Ballonets also may serve to provide pitch control. For small types the lifting gas is sometimes held in the hull itself, while larger types tend to use separate gas cells, mitigating the consequences of a single gas cell failure and helping to reduce the amount of overpressure needed.

== History ==
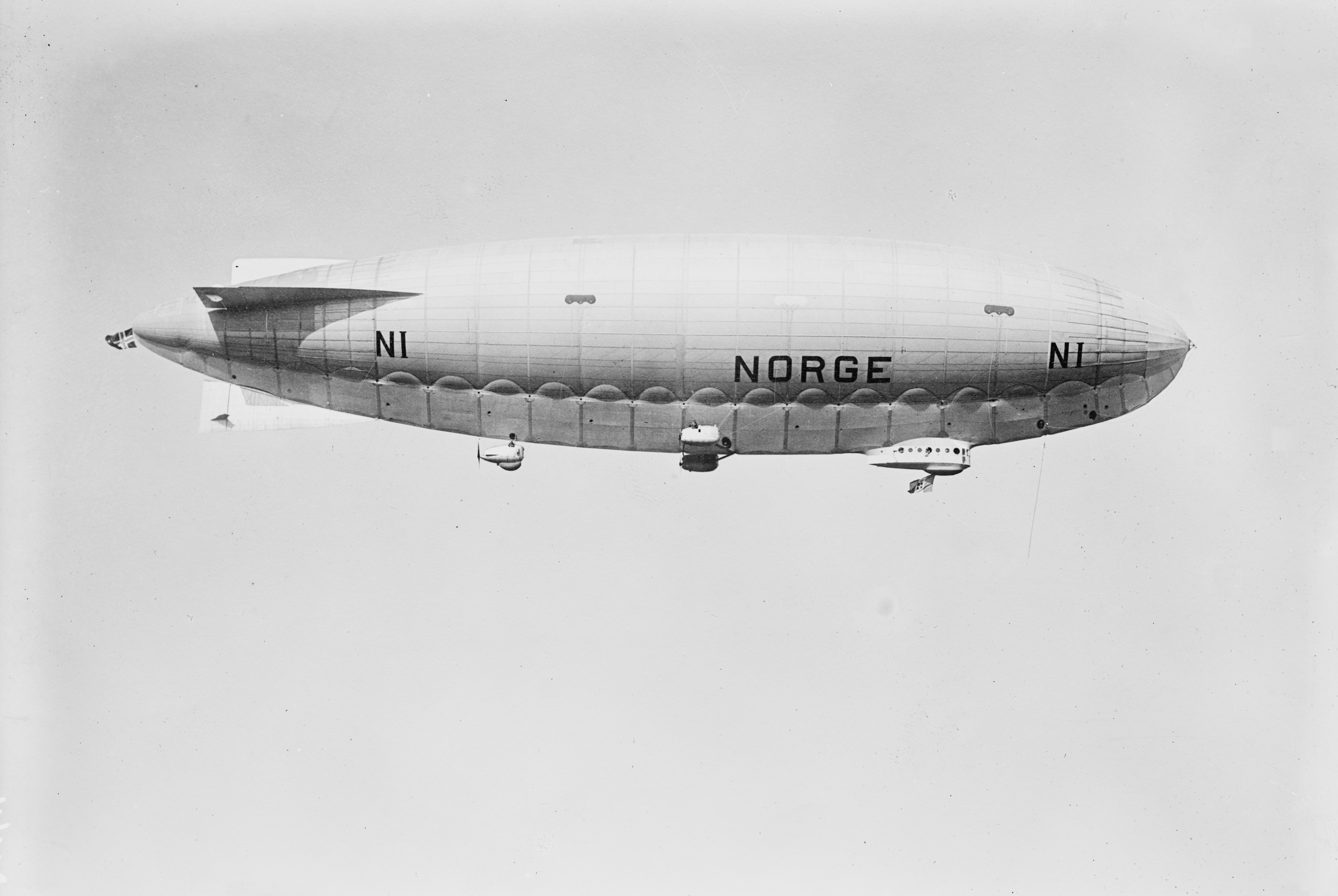
Italian explorer Umberto Nobile crossed the North Pole in his semi-rigid airship Norge in 1926.

In the first decade of the twentieth century, semi-rigid airships were considered more suitable for military use because, unlike rigid airships, they could be deflated, stored and transported by land or by sea. Non-rigid airships had a limited lifting capacity due to the strength limitations of the envelope and rigging materials then in use.

An early successful example is the Groß-Basenach design made by Major Hans Groß from the Luftschiffer-Bataillon Nr. 1 in Berlin, the experimental first ship flying in 1907. It had a rigid keel under the envelope. Four more military airships of this design were built, and often rebuilt, designated M I to M IV, up to 1914.

The most advanced construction of semi-rigid airships between the two World Wars took place in Italy. There, the state-factory Stabilimento di Costruzioni Aeronautiche (SCA) constructed several. Umberto Nobile, later General and director, was its most well-known member, and he designed and flew several semi-rigid airships, including the Norge and Italia, for his overflights of the North Pole, and the W6 OSOAVIAKhIM, for the Soviet Union's airship program.

== List of other semi-rigid airships ==
Pre-War and WWI

- Bartolomeu de Gusmão from Augusto Severo de Albuquerque Maranhão in Brazil in 1894, destroyed in March 1894 by a gust of wind
- Pax from Augusto Severo de Albuquerque Maranhão in France in 1902, caught fire at its first ascent, killing the pilot
- Le Jaune - Built by Lebaudy Frères in France, first flight: 1902-11-13. Lebaudy built many other semi-rigid airships, among them the Patrie and the République.
- British Army Dirigible No 1, often called the Nulli Secundus.
- Forlanini F.1 Leonardo da Vinci, Italy, 3265 m^{3}, 40 PS, first ascent: 1909; 1910-02-01 damaged beyond repair
- The Groß-Basenach-type airship (5 built for the Prussian army)
- The Luftschiff von Veeh (also Veeh 1 or Stahlluftschiff) built by Albert Paul Veeh from Apolda in Düsseldorf in the 1910s
- Siemens-Schuckert I (1911),
- M.1, Italian, first flight 1912, 83-metre long, 17-metre diameter, 2× 250 PS Fiat SA.76-4 engines each with one airscrew, payload: 3800 kg, first with the Army then the Navy, 164 flights, decommissioned 1924
- M.2, Città di Ferrara, Italian, first flight 1913, hull identical to the M.1, 83-metre long, 17-metre diameter, 4×125 PS driving two airscrews, payload 3000 kg, speed: 85 km/h, a Navy airship, stationed in Jesi, on 1915-06-08 shot down by an Austrian flying boat
- Forlanini F.2 Città di Milano, Italy, 11,500 m^{3}, 2×85 PS, first flight: 1913-04-09, destroyed 1914-04-09 at Como
- SR.1 (M-class) built by Italy for England 1918, 12,500 m^{3}, 83 m long, 17 m Diameter, 9-man crew, internal keel of triangular steel components

1920s and 1930s

- Among the Parseval airships designed by August von Parseval in the 1900s-1930s:
  - PL 26 and PL 27
  - Parseval-Naatz designs
- Zodiac V10 was built 1930 for the French Navy
- O-1 (airship) built by SCDA, Italy, and the only true semi-rigid airship to serve with United States Navy.
- RS-1 was the only American-built semi-rigid military airship (flown by the United States Army) Manufacturer: Goodyear, maiden flight: 1926.
- Raab-Katzenstein 27 - maiden flight: 1929-05-04

Nobile's company designed or built the following airships:

- T 34 Roma, 33,810 m^{3}, sold to US Army in 1921 and destroyed in 1922 after rudder malfunction caused collision with high tension wires
- N 1 Norge, 19,000 m^{3}, reached the North Pole in 1926
- N 2 a 7000 m^{3}-airship built in hangars at Augusta, Sicily
- N 3 Sold to Japan as naval Airship No. 6, first flight on 1927-04-06. It was lost in 1927 after encountering a typhoon in the Pacific. There were no fatalities
- N 4 Italia Flew to Svalbard for Arctic expedition 1928, crashed after third polar flight on return from North Pole
- N 5 was a project for a 55,000 cubic metre keel airship, many times interrupted, eventually abandoned 1928
- Nobile-designed airships of the Russian airship program, such as the Soviet SSSR-V6 OSOAVIAKhIM (1934–1938)
- The Fujikura company built the No. 8 semi-rigid airship for the Japanese Navy to replace the Nobile N 3, basing the design on the latter airship. The airship set a record for an endurance flight of 60 hours and 1 minute on 17 July 1931, a record later broken by the Soviet OSOAVIAKhIM.

== Current developments ==
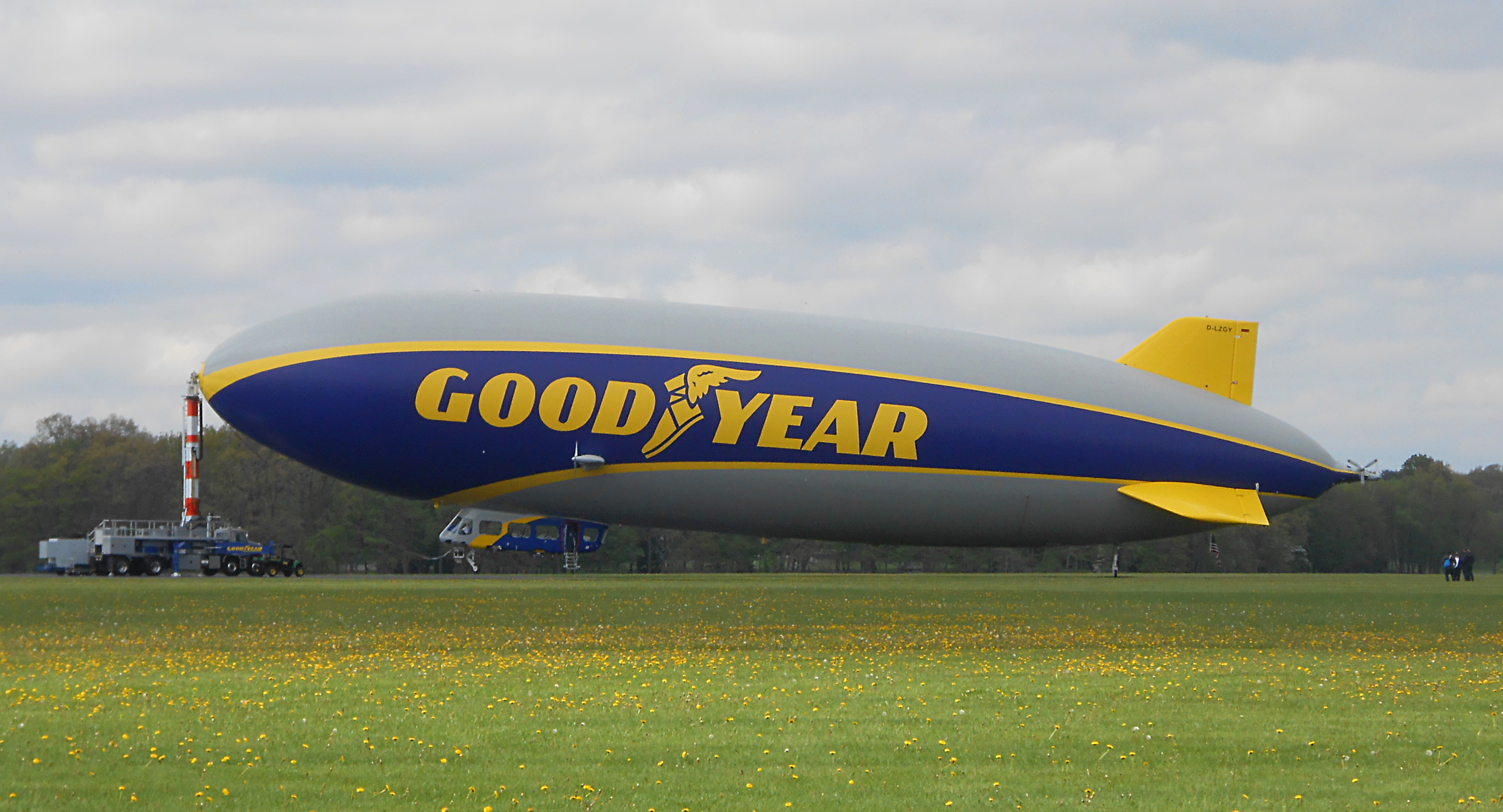
Goodyear Zeppelin NT at Mast

As of 2008, the only manned semi-rigid model of airship in active operation is the Zeppelin NT. It comprises a single gas cell kept at a slight over-pressure, ballonets to maintain constant volume, and a triangular keel structure internal to the cell. Three of these will be American-based airships. As of 2025, they are still in active service.

The CL160 Cargolifter was an unrealised design of the now liquidated German Cargolifter AG (1996–2003). Cargolifter Joey was a small semi-rigid experimental airship produced to test the design.

== See also ==
- Airship hangar
- Rigid airship
- Non-rigid airship
