= Hans Georg Friedrich Groß =

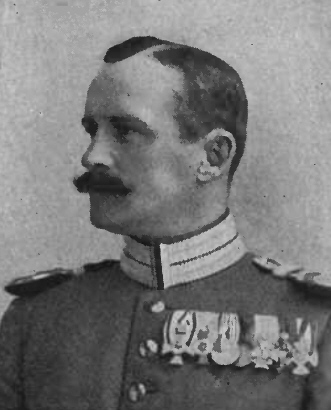
- Born: 4 May 1860; Samter
- Died: 27 February 1924 (aged 63); Berlin
- Military career
- Allegiance: German Empire
- Branch: Berliner Luftschifferabteilung
- Service years: 1890s–1918
- Rank: Major General
- Commands: Kommandeur des Königlich-Preußischen Luftschiffer-Bataillons 2 (1906–1918)

Hans Georg Friedrich Groß (4 May 1860 – 27 February 1924) was a German balloonist and airship constructor.

== Balloons ==
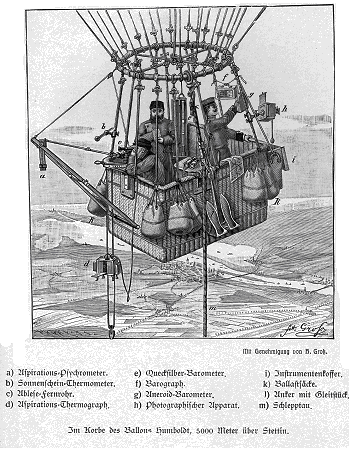
Humboldt Balloon with Berson, Aßmann and Groß, drawn by Groß

In the 1890s, the Verein zur Förderung der Luftschifffahrt (an association promoting airflight founded in 1881) conducted scientific balloon ascents to study the upper atmosphere on the initiative of Richard Assmann. Hans Groß was Premiereleutnant of the Berliner Luftschifferabteilung (Berlin airship department), and as balloon pilot took part in 28 of these studies.

Hydrogen balloon plans by Groß led to the construction of the Humboldt. This performed six ascents, two ending in non-fatal crashes; during deflation after its final landing on 26 April 1893, it exploded due to electrostatic charging and burnt. For his next balloon, the Phönix, Groß developed a variant of the Reißbahn invented by John Wise in 1844. This allowed the pilot to rapidly deflate a gas balloon upon landing. The Phönix performed 23 manned ascents from 1893 to 1896, a total 180 hours in the air and reached a maximum altitude of 9155 metres on 1894-12-04 with Arthur Berson.

== Airships ==
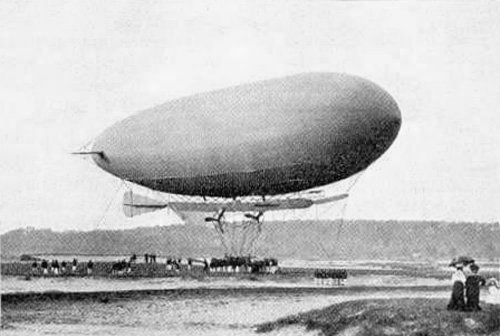
Groß-Basenach M I, the first of four German military airships

In 1895 and 1896 Groß supported David Schwarz in the development of his metal-clad airship.

In 1906 Groß rose in rank to Major and became commander of the Royal Prussian Airship Battalion Number 2. With Nikolaus Basenach in 1906 he started construction of the first German military airship, an experimental keeled semi-rigid airship. This became designated the Groß-Basenach-type and resulted in a Versuchsluftschiff (first flight 5 July 1907) followed by the airships M I (first flight 1908-06-30) to M IV. M I achieved a distance record of 300 kilometres over thirteen hours in 11 and 12 September 1908.

In 1910 he was honoured by having the street Großstraße in Berlin-Köpenick named after him. At the end of 1913 he was appointed Inspector of the Telegraph Troops at Karlsruhe in the rank of lieutenant-colonel. He continued to hold this position after the outbreak of the First World War. Groß retired from active service in 1918 with the rank of Major General.

== See also ==
- Groß-Basenach
