= Roma (airship) =

US Army airship destroyed in 1922

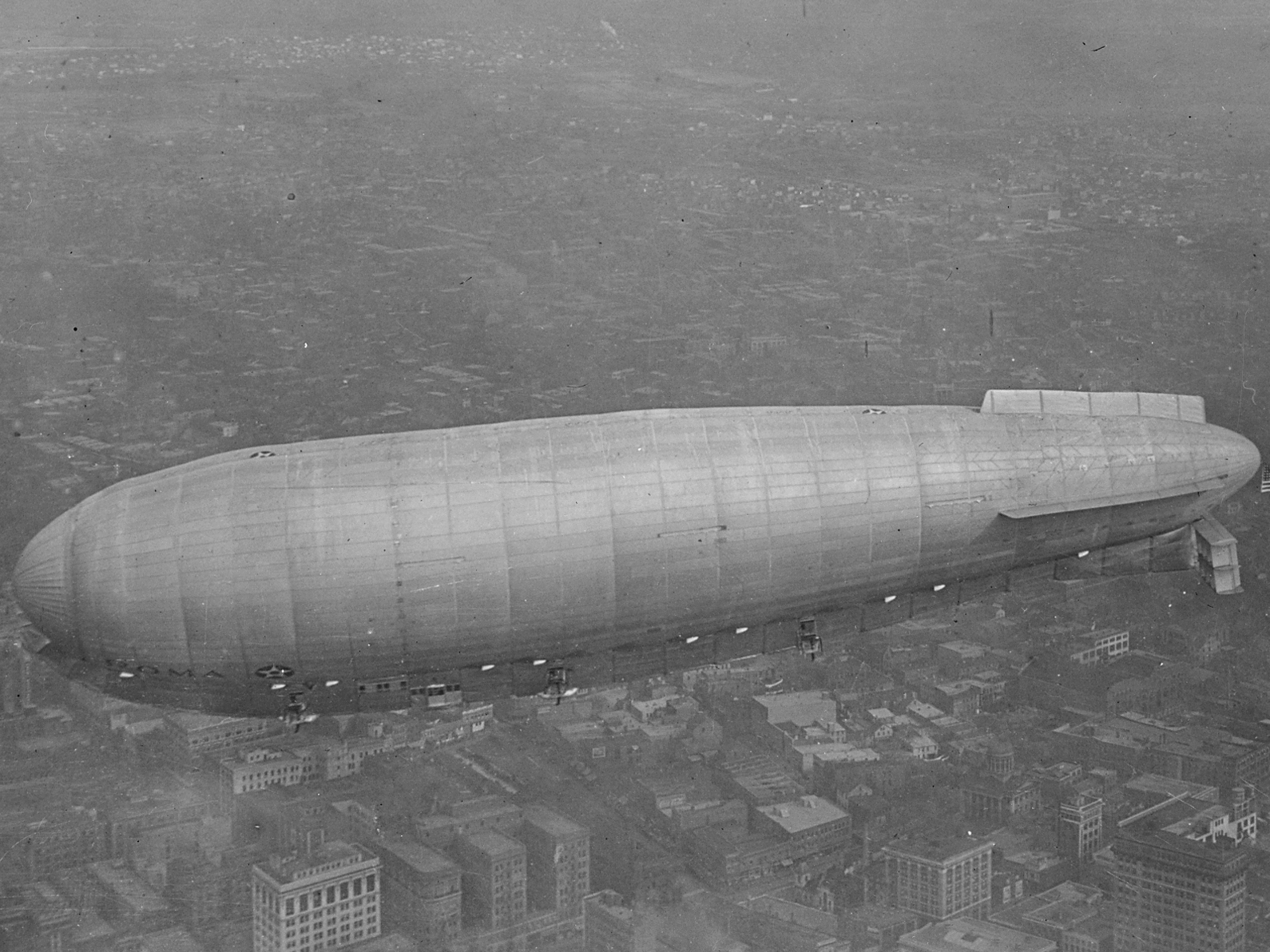

General information
- Role: Training airship
- National origin: Italy
- Manufacturer: Stabilimento Construzioni Aeronautiche (SCA)
- Designer: Umberto Nobile
- Service: United States Army Air Service
- Number built: 1

History
- First flight: September 1920 (Italy); 15 November 1921 (USA)
- Last flight: 21 February 1922
- Fate: Destroyed after crash and explosion

Roma was an Italian-built semi-rigid airship, designated by its designer as the Model T-34. Purchased by the United States from the Italian government in 1921, Roma was operated for three months by the United States Army Air Service from November 15, 1921, to February 21, 1922, when it crashed and exploded in Norfolk, Virginia, killing 34 crewmen and passengers aboard, with 9 survivors. As a result of this accident, Roma was the last hydrogen inflated airship flown by the US military; all subsequent US Army and Navy airships were inflated with non-flammable helium.

== Design and development ==
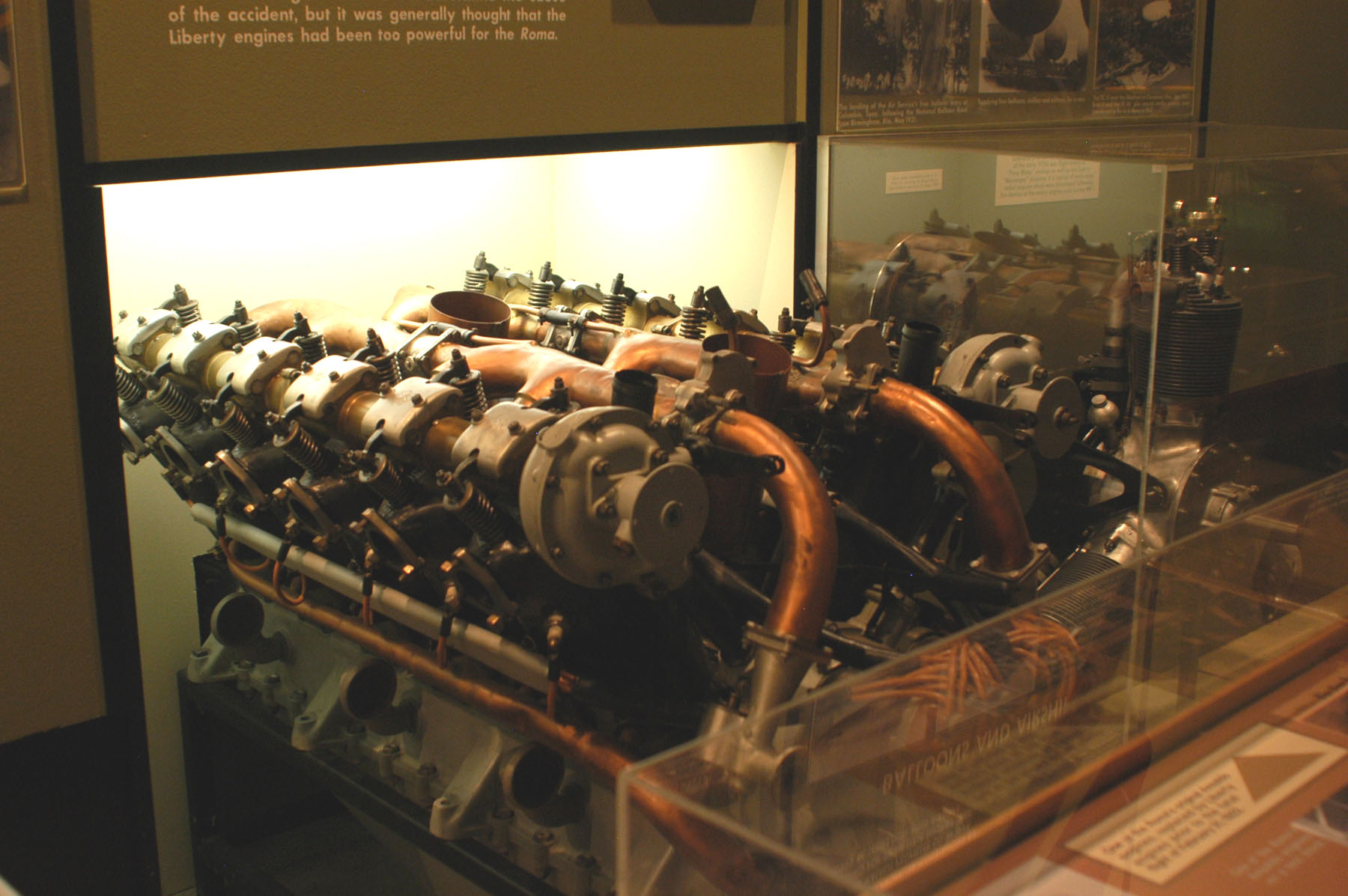
Ansaldo V-12 from Roma

Roma was designed by Celestino Usuelli, the engineers Eugenio Prassone, Umberto Nobile and Colonel Gaetano Crocco. Designated and advertised as the Model T-34, it was the first project of the Stabilimento Costruzioni Aeronautiche ("Aeronautical Construction Factory"), for the partnership of Nobile, Usuelli, Croce and Giuseppe Valle. The T-34 was designed for trans-Atlantic crossings carrying up to 100 passengers, though initially fitted for 25. When constructed, Roma was the largest semi-rigid airship in the world.

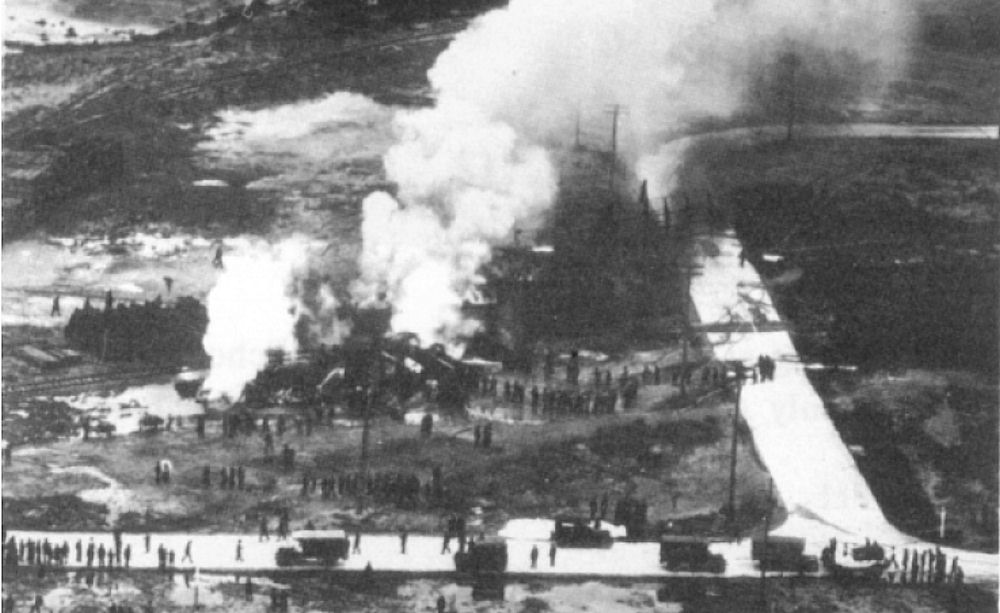
Wreck of Roma

As a semi-rigid design it was built about a rigid keel - though the keel was partially articulated to allow some flexibility. The passenger spaces and control cabin were within the keel. The engines, 400 hp Ansaldo 4E-2940 V-12s, were mounted outside, angled such that the slipstreams would not interfere with each other.

== Service ==
Roma made its first trial flight in September, 1920. The airship was purchased by the United States Army Air Service for $184,000 (equivalent to $3.3 million in 2025). During the inspection and delivery ceremonies in March, 1921, the Italians took the new owners of Roma on a 300-mile (480 km) demonstration flight from Rome to Naples and back. Aboard the dirigible were the US Ambassador to Italy, his wife and several Army officers. The passengers were served lunch while flying over the island of Capri.

The Army originally planned to fly Roma to the United States, but instead the airship was dismantled, packed in several crates and transported by ship, arriving in the US in August, 1921. When the Army unpacked the crates after their arrival at Langley Field, they found the airship's fabric outer cover had mildewed and weakened. After being reassembled with some difficulty by US Army Air Service crews at Langley, Roma flew in America for the first time on November 15, 1921, with minor problems. On a subsequent flight, a propeller disintegrated, ripped through the envelope and slashed open a gas bag. Fortunately, the dirigible managed to return to Langley Field safely.

On December 21, 1921, during a flight to Washington, D.C., Roma experienced several engine breakdowns due to the extremely cold weather. After the return to Langley was made on only four engines, the original Italian Ansaldo engines were replaced with six more reliable Liberty L-12's.

== Crash ==
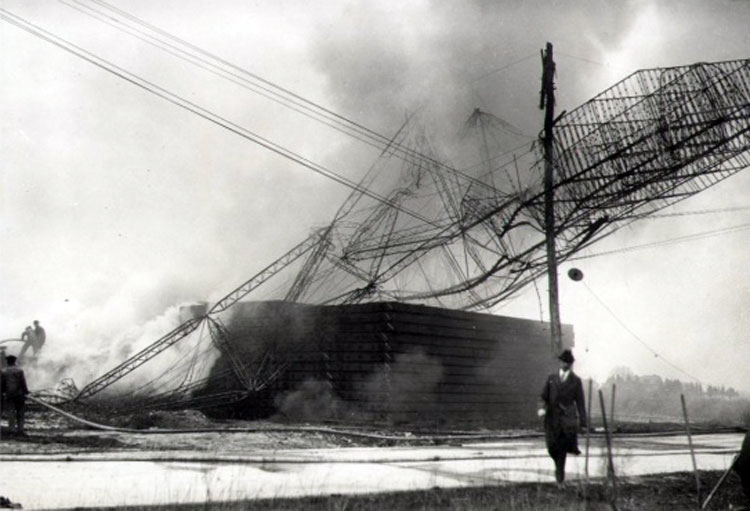
The smoldering remains of Roma after it crashed into high tension lines

On February 21, 1922, Roma crashed in Norfolk, Virginia during a test flight. The airship left Langley Field around 2:00 PM with 45 people on board, most of whom were US Army airmen. There were also a few civilians on board the flight, including mechanics and government observers. After lifting off from Langley, the pilot, Captain Dale Mabry, set a course along the shore of Chesapeake Bay that took the airship over Buckroe Beach, and Fort Monroe, before crossing Hampton Roads and passing over Willoughby Spit en route to the Norfolk Navy Base. The crash of Roma was caused by failure of the airship's peculiar box rudder system, which allowed it to maneuver over tight areas. Witnesses on the ground reported seeing the entire box rudder slip sideways; suddenly uncontrollable, Roma flew straight into the ground at the Army's Norfolk Quartermaster Depot (now the location of Norfolk International Terminals) from an altitude of 1,000 feet (300 m). Just before the bow struck the ground, the dirigible contacted high-voltage power lines and burst into flames. A total of 34 people were killed, 8 were injured, and 3 escaped unharmed. Among the dead was Captain Mabry. The crash of Roma marked the greatest disaster in the history of American aeronautics up to that time.

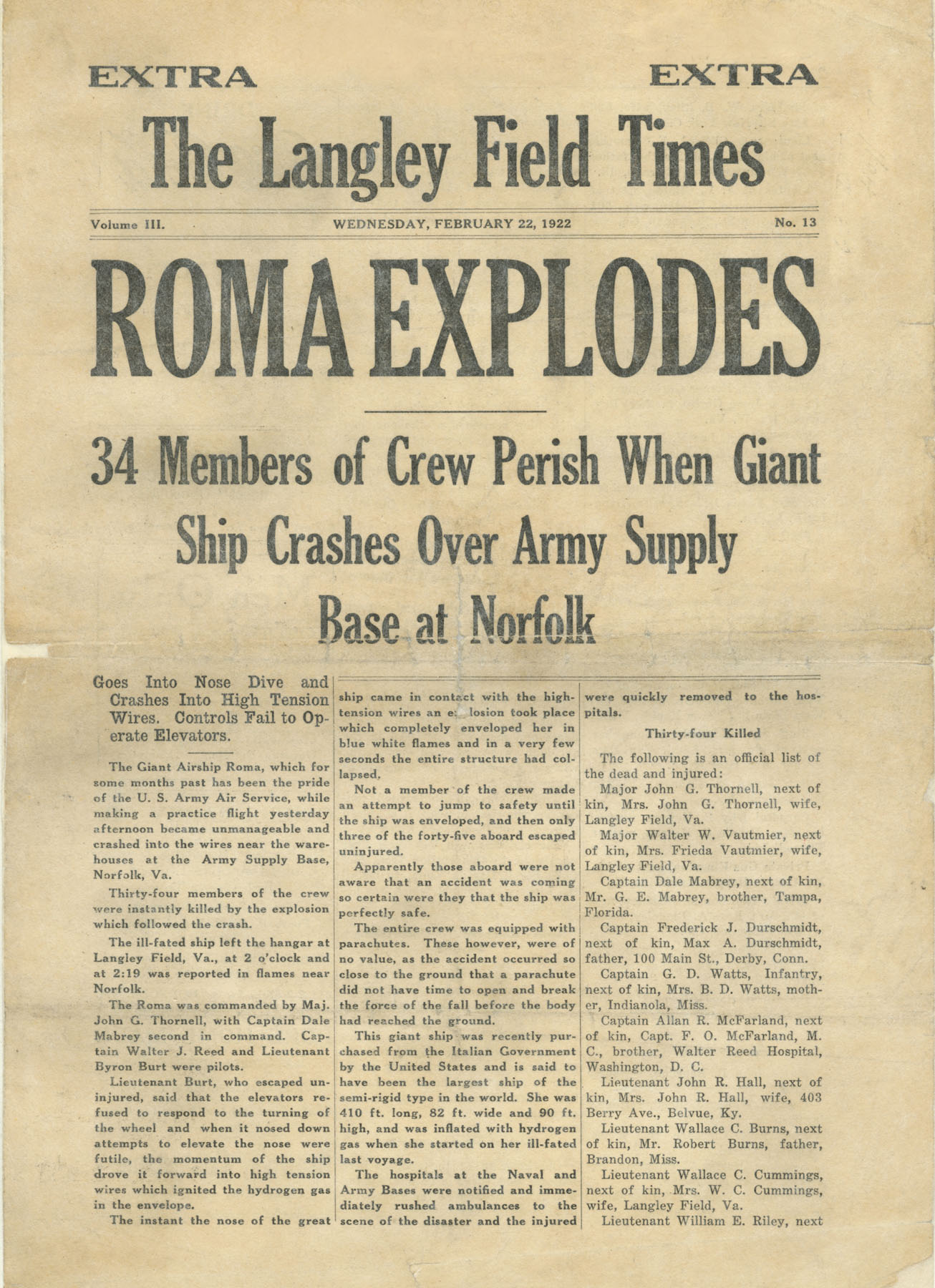
1922 newspaper reporting the loss of Roma

Master Sergeant Harry A. Chapman was given the Cheney Award for his heroics during the crash. He was the first recipient of the award, which was presented to him in 1928 by President Calvin Coolidge.

Although it was America's worst aviation disaster at the time, a century later the crash of Roma has largely faded into obscurity, nearly completely eclipsed by the Hindenburg disaster, which occurred 15 years later and effectively ended the airship era. The site at Langley Air Force Base where Roma's massive hangar once stood, is now a parking lot; it is still known as the "LTA" ("lighter than air") area, and Roma Road, inside the base, is named in remembrance of the ill-fated airship.

== Specifications ==
Data from

General characteristics

- Length: 125 m (410 ft 0 in)
- Diameter: 25 m (82 ft 0 in)
- Height: 28 m (92 ft)
- Volume: 33,810 m^{3} (1,193,000 cu ft)
- Empty weight: 15,400 kg (34,000 lb)
- Max takeoff weight: 34,500 kg (76,000 lb)
- Useful lift: 19,100 kg (42,000 lb)
- Powerplant: 6 × Liberty L12 , 300 kW (400 hp) each

Performance

- Maximum speed: 128 km/h (80 mph, 70 kn)
- Cruise speed: 90 km/h (56 mph, 49 kn)
- Range: 4,800 km (3,000 mi, 2,600 nmi)

== Bibliography ==
- Caliaro, Luginio (January 2021). "The Short Tragic Life of the Airship Roma". The Aviation Historian (34): 50–57. ISSN 2051-1930.
- "The "Roma" Disaster", Flight, XIV (688): 140, 2 March 1922, archived from the original (pdf) on 6 March 2016
- Tampa Times, February 22, 1922. Page 1.
- Smith, Alfred Emanuel; Walton, Francis (March 3, 1922). "The Destruction Of The Roma". The Outlook. Vol. 130. pp. 369–370.
