= SSSR-V6 Osoaviakhim =

Soviet airship

Coordinates: 67.0480°N 31.9370°E

V6 Osoaviakhim
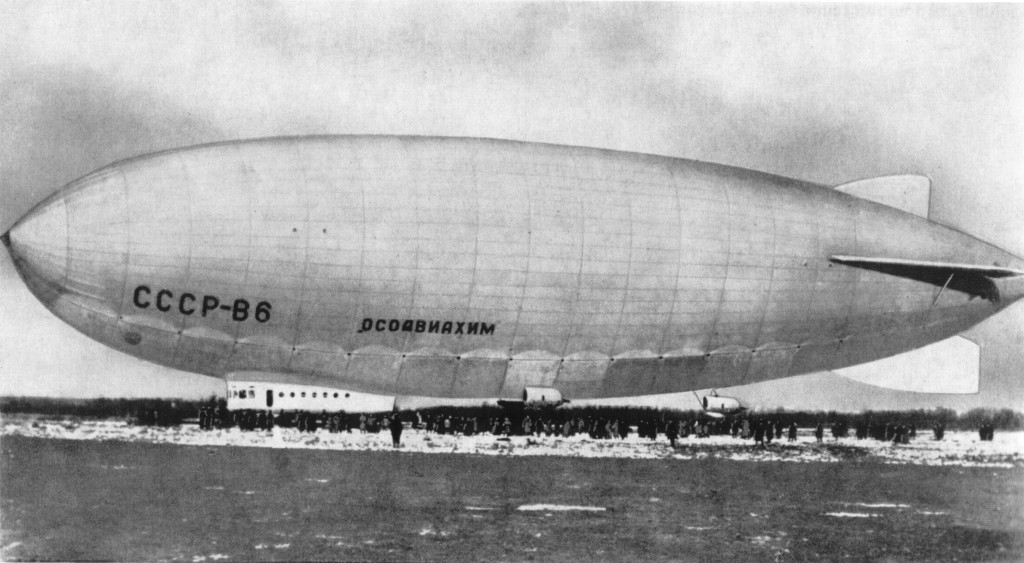
- V6 Osoaviakhim

General information
- Type: Passenger/commercial airship
- Manufacturer: Soviet airship program
- Designer: Umberto Nobile
- Status: Destroyed in crash on 6 February 1938
- Number built: 1

History
- First flight: 5 November 1934

SSSR-V6 Osoaviakhim (Russian: СССР-В6 Осоавиахим) was a semi-rigid airship designed by Italian engineer and airship designer Umberto Nobile and constructed as a part of the Soviet airship program. The airship was named after the Soviet organisation OSOAVIAKhIM. V6 was the largest airship built in the Soviet Union and one of the most successful. In October 1937, V6 broke the world record for airship endurance previously held by the Graf Zeppelin; under the command of Ivan Pankow, the airship remained aloft for 130 hours 27 minutes.

== Crash ==
In February 1938, a Soviet Arctic expedition led by Ivan Papanin became stranded on pack ice. V6 was sent on a rescue mission from Moscow with a short intermediate landing in Murmansk.

At approximately 19:30 on 6 February 1938, V6 crashed into a hillside near Kandalaksha, 220 km south of Murmansk. the airship caught fire and was totally destroyed. Of the 19 passengers and crew on board, 13 perished. Their remains were laid to rest at the Novodevichy Cemetery in Moscow. In 1972, a memorial was erected at the crash site by local authorities and the citizens of Kandalaksha. There is also a memorial sign in Dolgoprudny at the former Soviet airship base.

Official reports by TASS stated that the crash was due to poor visibility and insufficient altitude. The details and conclusions of the Soviet investigation into the loss of airship were never made public. Among the circumstances assumed to have resulted in the crash were outdated charts and human error; some rumors indicated sabotage, but no evidence was ever presented.

Recent research revealed that the V6 flew off her route after the crew became disoriented in an unfamiliar area due to darkness and snowfall. Possibly contributing to the disorientation was ineffective use of radio navigation equipment (Telefunken's and Fairchild's RC-3 radio direction finders), lack of general navigational experience and human fatigue. Barometric altimeters could have accumulated error while the crew was unable to maintain constant visual control of the altitude.

The accident was a severe loss to the Soviet airship program which was eventually terminated in 1940.

== Specifications ==
Data from Belokrys (2017)

General characteristics

- Crew: 15
- Length: 104.5 m (342 ft 10 in)
- Width: 18.4 m (60 ft 4 in)
- Height: 25.5 m (83 ft 8 in)
- Volume: 19,400 m^{3} (685,105 cu ft)
- Empty weight: 11,700 kg (25,794 lb)
- Useful lift: 9,640 kg (21,253 lb)
- Powerplant: 3 × Maybach Mb.IVa engines , 194 kW (260 hp) each

Performance

- Maximum speed: 111 km/h (67 mph, 58 kn)
- Cruise speed: 104 km/h (64 mph, 56 kn)
- Range: 4,800 km (2,980 mi, 2,590 nmi)
- Endurance: 103 hours 27 minutes
- Service ceiling: 3,300 m (10,827 ft) Maximum height actually reached.

== See also ==
- List of airship accidents
