= Gross-Basenach =

Airships

Gross-Basenach or Groß-Basenach is the designation for a series of five so-called M-class German military semi-rigid airships constructed by balloonist Nikolaus Basenach and Major Hans Georg Friedrich Groß (1860–1924) of the Royal Prussian Airship Battalion Nr 2 between 1907 and 1914.

They produced one experimental and four military Groß-Basenach types, rebuilding each one several times. In all they were not as successful as Major Groß wished. He was one of the sharpest critics of the Zeppelin airships, but the overall superiority and popularity of the Zeppelins doomed his own airships. Even his more successful competitors, Parseval and Schütte-Lanz, could not compete with Zeppelin after the war's end.

== Versuchsluftschiff ==
The Versuchluftschiff (experimental airship) had a volume of 1,800 cubic metres and had a keel directly under the balloon envelope. It was mostly constructed by the firm Siemens-Schuckert GmbH.

The first flight took place at 1907-05-07. The power plant was a 24-25 horsepower (HP) Gaggenau automobile engine and allowed a top speed of 29 kilometres per hour (18 mph).

Later the airship was rebuilt, including among other things the empennage.

== M I ==
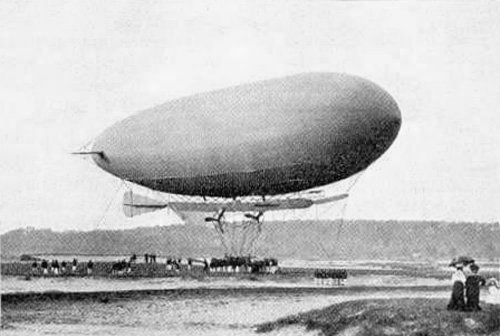
Groß-Basenach M I

- 5,000 m³ volume
- Length 65.5 metres, Diameter 11.1 metre
- built by the Luftschiffer-Bataillon in Berlin Tegel
- First flight: 30 June 1908
- Propulsion: two Körting-engines each 75 HP

On 21 September 1908 it set a flight endurance record of over 13 hours. In 1913 the hull was lengthened to 71.8 metres. In its lengthened state it first flew on 26 March 1913. The keel was changed three times and the volume increased to 5600 m³. Nevertheless, the maximum speed remained unchanged at 47 kilometres per hour (29 mph).

== M II ==
M II was built in 1909 and enlarged in 1911.

== M III ==
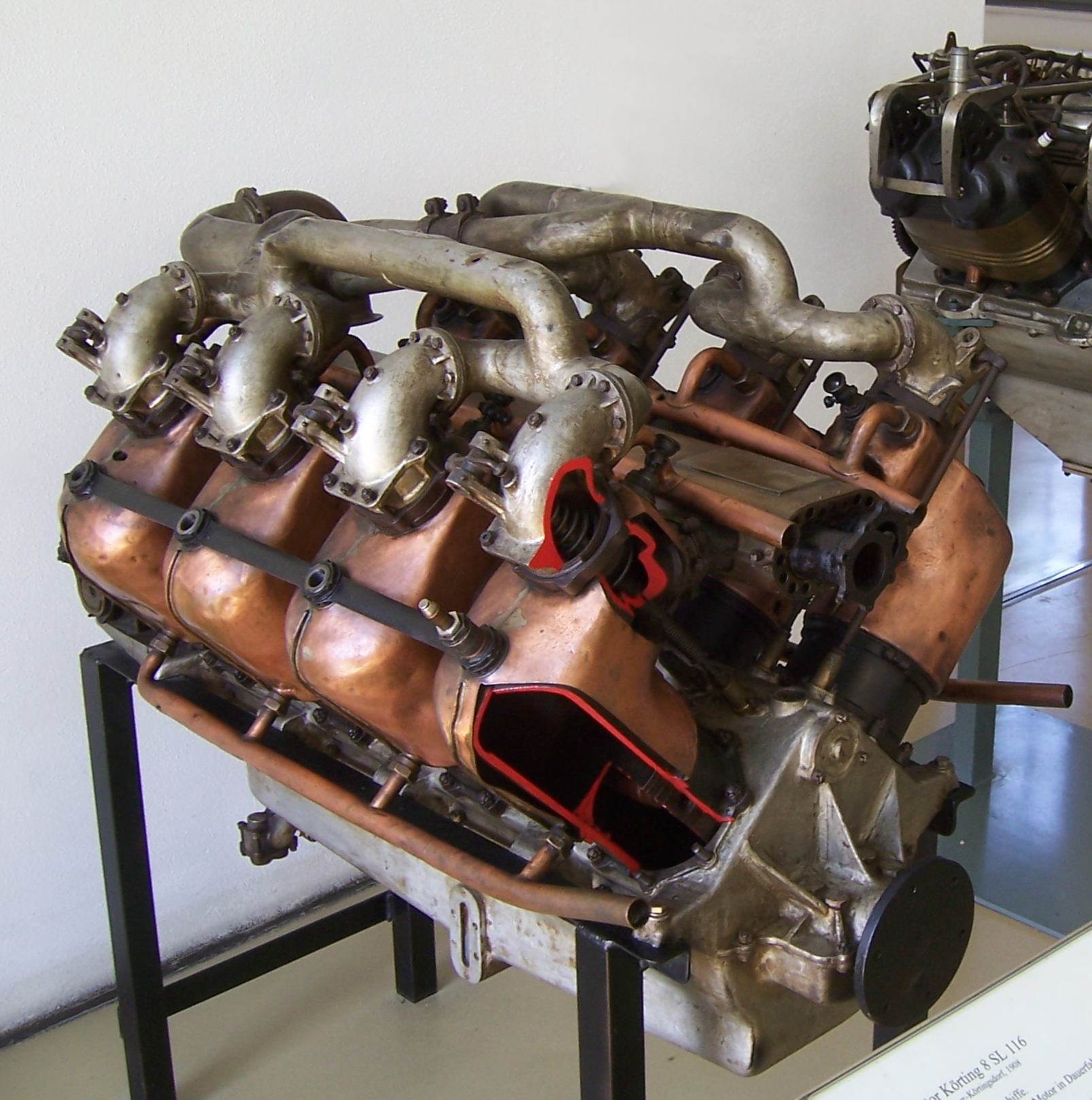
Engine Körting 8 SL 116

M III was built in 1909 and first flew on 31 December 1909

- Volume: 7,800 m³
- Länge: 81.5 metres
- enlarged in 1912 to 9,000 m³ and a length of 83.3 metre
- Propulsion: two Körting-engines each 75 HP
- Maximum speed: 59 kilometres per hour (37 mph); after rebuild: 68 kilometres per hour (42 mph)

M III was the fastest airship of its time.

== M IV ==
- 19,000 cubic metres volume
- fitted with a ballonet to regulate the pressure
- 1913 Rebuilt and equipped with 100-kilogram bombs
- 1914 enlarged
- Propulsion: three Maybach-engines with a total of 480 horsepower (360 kW)

M IV achieved a top speed of 82 kilometres per hour (51 mph). From 28 December 1914 until 3 November 1915 it performed 24 patrols over the Baltic Sea. On 10 September 1915 it attacked a submarine with 100-kilogram bombs.
