= List of Forlanini airships =

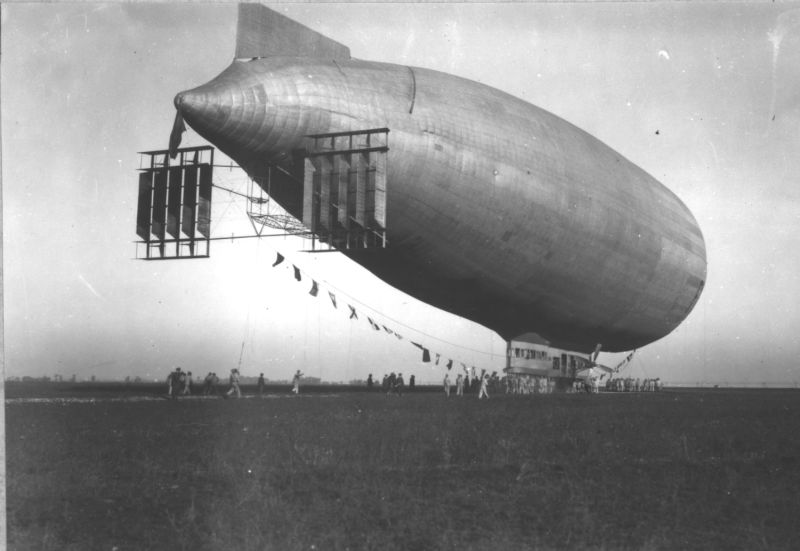
F.6 Forlanini Airship

This is a complete list of Forlanini airships designed and built by the Italian pioneer Enrico Forlanini from 1900 to 1931 (posthumously). These, like the German Groß-Basenach semi-rigid airships, were the first to have the gondola attached to the envelope, to reduce air resistance.

== F.1 Leonardo da Vinci ==
- Designed: 1900-1901
- Maiden flight: 2 July 1909
- Flights: 38, total distance 850 km.
- Longest duration: 90 minutes
- Length: 40 metres
- Volume: 3,265 cubic metres
- Propulsion: One Antoinette engine of 40 HP
- Maximum speed: 52 km/h

Construction started in 1900 collaboration with Cesare del Fabbro. Its first flight in 1909 was one year after the first Italian semi-rigid flight by Gaetano Arturo Crocco. Like all the Forlanini airships, except the Omnia Dir, the empennage comprised groups of multiple planes at the poop and at the tail.

== F.2 Città di Milano ==
- Maiden flight: 17 August 1913
- Flights: 43
- Length: 72 metres
- Volume: 12,000 cubic metres
- Gas cells: 12
- Propulsion: Two Isotta Fraschini engines of 80 HP each
- Maximum speed: 70 km/h
- Flight ceiling: 2400 metres
- Useful payload: 5 tonne
- Owner: Royal Italian Army (Regio Esercito)
- Fate: 9 April 1914 emergency landing during storm, then damaged by trees and terrain while moored. While attempting to deflate gas cells, caught fire and destroyed.

F.2's gondola was divided in three compartments: the command cabin, passenger cabin, and machine room. For safety all the material was treated with a fire suppressant and the envelope was double-skinned.

== F.3 Città di Milano II ==
- Volume: 13,790 cubic metres
- Propulsion: Four FIAT S.54-A engines of 80 HP each
- Maximum speed: 80 km/h
- Flight endurance: 24 hours
- Useful payload: 6 tonne
- Fate: built for the British government but due to World War I requisitioned by the Italian Army in 1918

== F.4 ==
- Volume: 15,000 cubic metres
- Built: 1915
- Owner: Marina Italiana

== F.5 ==
- Built: 1917
- Volume: 17,783 cubic metres
- Length: 300 feet (91 m)
- Maximum width: 66 feet (20 m)
- Propulsion: Two FIAT S.76-A engines of 350 HP each
- Flight ceiling: 20,000 feet (6,100 m)
- Gas cells: 12
- Payload: 22,000 pounds (10,000 kg)
- Crew: 5: commander, two officers, two mechanics
- Owner: Royal Italian Army
- Fate: military operations, decommissioned 6 February 1918

== F.6 ==
- Built: 1918
- Volume: 15,000 cubic metres
- Propulsion: Four Isotta Fraschini IV-B engines of 180 HP each
- Owner: Royal Italian Army (Regio Esercito)
- Fate: one single military mission before the armistice

== Omnia Dir ==
- Built: 1931
- Volume: 4,000 cubic metres
- Propulsion: One Isotta Fraschini of 150 HP
- Note: Used two groups of five jets of compressed air for maneuvering, one at each end

== See also ==
- Enrico Forlanini
- Airships of Italy
- Italian military aircraft 1910-1919
