= Vera Mityagina =

- Вера Федоровна Демина (Митягина)
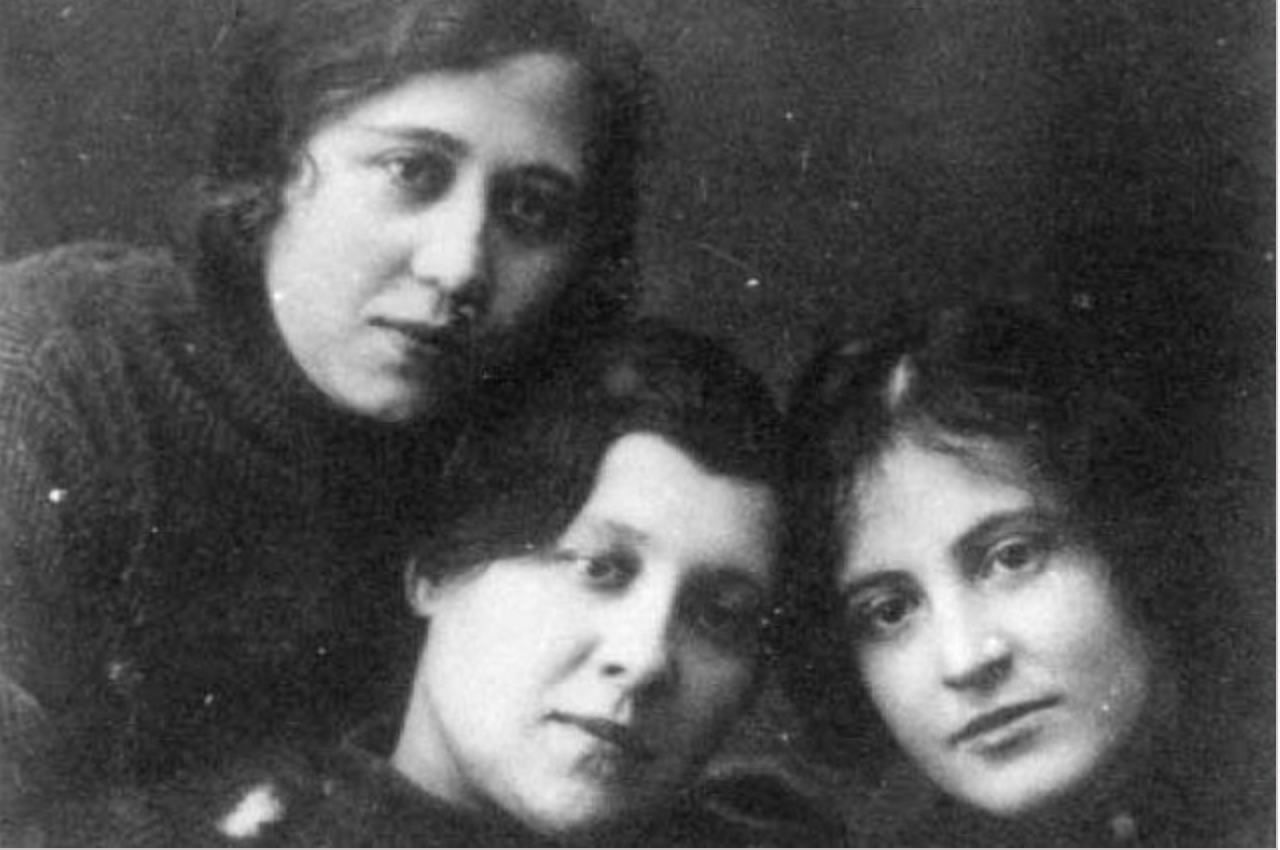
- Vera Mityagina (left) alongside her crew: Yevgeniya Khovrina (middle) and Lyudmila Vasilievna Eichenvald (right)
- Born: 1911
- Died: 1984 (aged 72–73)
- Education: Osoaviakhim (Society for the Promotion of Defense, Aviation and Chemical Construction)
- Occupation: Airship Pilot
- Known for: First Woman Airship Commander
- Spouse: Sergey Demin

Vera Fedorovna Demina née Mityagina (Russian: Вера Федоровна Демина (Митягина); 1911–1984) was a Soviet airship pilot. At the age of 28, Mityagina became the first woman to command an airship. In 1937, she commanded a female flight crew on the Soviet USSR-V1 airship.

== Early life ==
Mityagina began as a telephone operator in Moscow. While working, she attended the flight school of Osoaviakhim (Society for the Promotion of Defense, Aviation and Chemical Construction), where she attended courses on airship control. After studying in the classroom, Mityagina first flew balloons then later was allowed to fly airships.

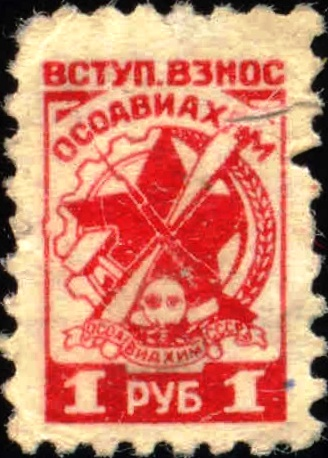
Stamp of Osoaviakhim

In her first flight in a balloon, an accident occurred at 6,500 feet when the canvas of the balloon caught fire. Under the direction of her commander, Mityagina successfully cut free a portion of the canvas and was able to safely land on the ground with an improvised parachute.

Mityagina graduated from flight school in 1932.

== Personal life ==
Mityagina married Soviet airship commander Sergey Demin. On 6 February 1938 he died at the age of 32 in the USSR-V6 accident near Kandalaksha.

== Airship Pilot ==
After graduating from flight school, she began piloting balloons and airships. At the age of 22, Vera Mityagina, together with Yevgenia Khovrina participated in a propaganda flight of a 900 cubic meter balloon "in order to improve further qualifications and in honor of International Women's Day." On 8 March 1934, the newspaper "Soviet Airship" reported on the flight "Fulfilling the slogan of V.I. Lenin on the emancipation of women and attracting them at all times of socialist construction and in the management of the state, the Party and the Government have achieved great success on this front. There are also a number of women in the Moscow Central Port of airships who, through tireless work on themselves, gnawing the granite of science, master the technique of navigation."

In 1937, alongside her flight crew which comprised Lyudmila Eichenwald as the assistant commander of the ship and Yevgeny Khovrin as flight technician, Mityagina commanded the first all-woman crew to pilot an airship. Their ship was a non-rigid airship of the USSR-V1. Mityagina was 28 at the time.

The USSR-V1 (also known as the SSSR-V1) was a small non-rigid airship with a volume of 2,200 cubic meters with two 75 hp engines, capable of reaching a speed of 95 km/h (or 51 knots). The USSR-B1 made its first test flight in Leningrad on April 19, 1931. The ship's design influenced the later design of the V12 model in 1942. The ship was reconfigured and overhauled multiple times, the last time being in 1939.

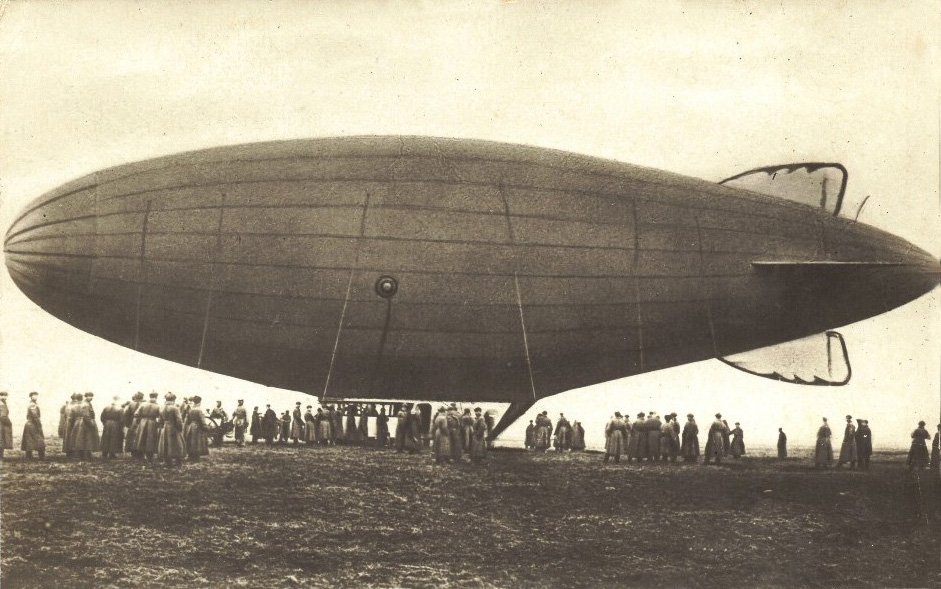
USSR V-1 Airship

The USSR-V1 was developed alongside the larger V2 and V3 models, which were 5,010 and 6,500 cubic meters in size, respectively. They were all developed during the first Five Year Plan which invested in experimental blimps. The V1, V2, and V3 models were all constructed in Leningrad and proved to be effective for passenger and freight transport.

At the beginning of World War II, Mityagina was sent to the Western Front as part of the 18th squadron of the aeronautical detachment. Alongside fellow pilot Viktor Pochekin, Mityagina carried out aerial reconnaissance. Their ship was shot down near Kiev. Mityagina was unable to escape due to injury and was ultimately captured by the Germans and imprisoned at Vladimir-Volynsky concentration camp. Due to her medical knowledge, she was able to help wounded prisoners at the camp. Presumed dead, her relatives held funeral services for her. However, in the spring of 1945 she returned home alive.

== Soviet Women in Aviation ==
Vera Mityagina's achievement as first woman to command a Soviet airship was at the beginning of a long history of Soviet women in aviation. The USSR was the first state to allow women pilots to fly in combat. During World War II, months after the German invasion, the all-female Aviation Group No. 122 was formed under famous pilot Marina Raskova. The 122nd trained pilots, navigators, mechanics, and ground crews for three new regiments: the 568th Fighter Aviation Regiment, 587th (later the 125th Guards) Bomber Aviation Regiment, and 588th Night Bomber Aviation Regiment (also known as the 46th Guard or the Night Witches). These all-women's aviation regiments received no special designation and flew with standard Soviet equipment until they received uniforms designed for women in 1943.

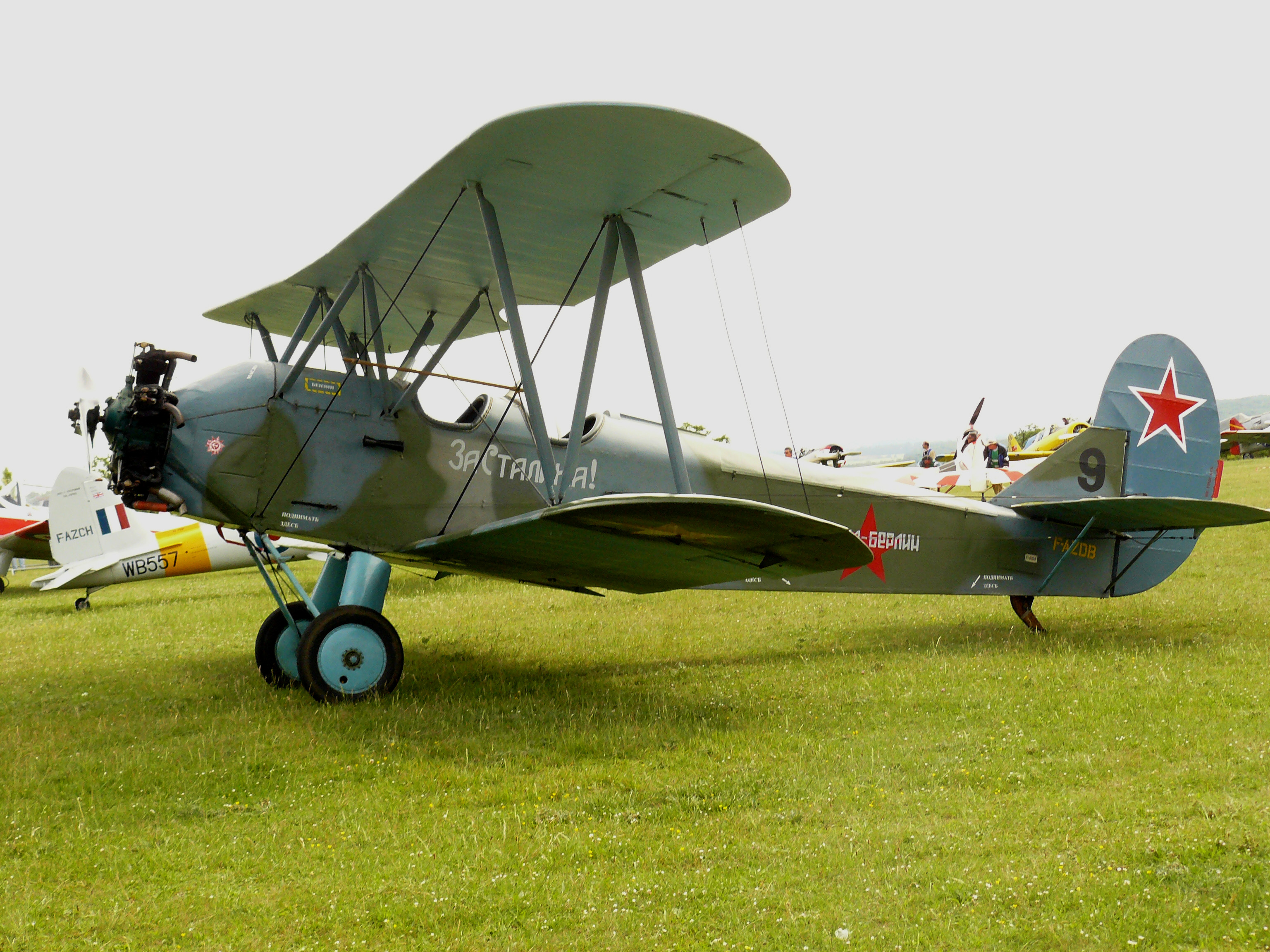
A Polikarpov Po-2, the aircraft type used by the 588th Night Bomber Regiment

The 588th Night Bomber Aviation Regiment had a single commander, Yevdokiya Bershanskaya, throughout the war. It was also the only of the three regiments that were formed under the Aviation Group No. 122 to remain entirely female throughout the war. On average, each crew of the 588th Regiment made 5-10 flights during the war, with some pilots and navigators completing as many as 17 flights in a single night. Between 1942 and 1945, the regiment had completed more than 24,000 combat sorties.

== Media Attention ==
Mityagina's command over the crew of the USSR-V1 was covered by several foreign newspapers.

On 30 January 1938, the American newspaper The Baltimore Sun published an article on Mityagina's achievement as first woman to command an airship.

Likewise, the English language propaganda newspaper Moscow News published an article championing Mityagina's achievement as a success for Soviet equality.
