= Board =

Board or Boards may refer to:

== Flat surface ==
- Lumber, or other rigid material, milled or sawn flat
  - Plank (wood)
  - Cutting board
  - Sounding board, of a musical instrument
- Cardboard (paper product)
- Paperboard
- Fiberboard
  - Hardboard, a type of fiberboard
- Particle board, also known as chipboard
  - Oriented strand board
- Printed circuit board, in computing and electronics
  - Motherboard, the main printed circuit board of a computer
- A reusable writing surface
  - Chalkboard
  - Whiteboard

== Recreation ==
- Game board
  - Chessboard
  - Checkerboard
- Board (bridge), a device used in playing duplicate bridge
- Board, colloquial term for the rebound statistic in basketball
- Board track racing, a type of motorsport popular in the United States during the 1910s and 1920s
- Boards, the wall around a bandy field or ice hockey rink
- Boardsports
- Diving board (disambiguation)

== Companies ==
- Board International, a Swiss software vendor known for its business intelligence software toolkit
- Bureau of Architecture, Research, and Design (BOARD), an architecture firm based in Rotterdam

== Groups ==
- Advisory board, a body that provides non-binding strategic advice to the management of a corporation
- Currency board, the monetary authority to maintain a fixed exchange rate with a foreign currency
- Board of directors, or a similar governing or advisory committee
- Board of selectmen, the executive arm of the government of New England towns in the United States
- Board of supervisors, a governmental body that oversees the operation of county government in some U.S. states
- Board of trustees, the authority of a nonprofit organization
- Editorial board, a group responsible for a publication's editorial policy
- Examination board, an organization that sets examinations, is responsible for marking them and distributes results
- Parole board, a panel that decides whether an offender should be released from prison
- Police board, a group charged with the responsibility of overseeing a local police force
- Supervisory board, a group responsible for hiring and firing a board of directors

== People ==
=== Sports ===
- C. J. Board (born 1993), American football player
- Chris Board (born 1995), American football player
- Dwaine Board (born 1956), American football player and coach
- Jim Board (born 1956), Australian rules footballer
- Michael Board (born 1970), British swimmer
- Terry Board (footballer, born 1945) (1945–2019), Australian rules footballer
- Terry Board (footballer, born 1968), Australian rules footballer

=== Other areas ===
- Kate Board, English airship pilot
- Mike Board (born 1952), Australian politician
- Mykel Board (born 1950), American journalist, musician, and writer
- Printz Board (born 1982), American record producer, songwriter, and singer
- Prudy Taylor Board (born 1933), American author and editor

== Other ==
- Board book, a book made more durable by the use of cardboard covers and thicker paper
- Board certification, for medical professionals in the United States
- Board examination, a part of education in some countries
- Board foot, measurement of lumber volume
- Boards (magazine), a 1999–2010 trade publication for the advertising community
- boards.ie, an Internet forum in Ireland
- Bulletin board (disambiguation), where people can leave public messages
- Distribution board or breaker panel, a component of an electricity supply system
- Room and board, in exchange for money, labor, or other consideration, a person is provided with a place to live as well as meals
- "The Big Board", nickname of the New York Stock Exchange

== See also ==
- Boarding (disambiguation)
- Bored (disambiguation)
- Soundboard (disambiguation)
- Switchboard (disambiguation)
