= Backboard =

Backboard may refer to:

- Backboard (basketball), equipment used in basketball
- Backboard (tennis), wall located at a tennis court attached to a fence
- Spinal board, a medical device used for the immobilization and transportation of patients with suspected spinal injuries (a.k.a. backboard and long spine board)
- A term in the sport of curling meaning the border at the extreme ends of the playing area

== See also ==
- Board (disambiguation)
- Blackboard (disambiguation)
