= Max Evans =

Max Evans may refer to:

- Max Evans (Australian footballer) (1923–2006), Australian rules footballer
- Max Evans (politician) (born 1930), former Australian politician
- Max Evans (rugby union) (born 1983), Scottish international rugby union rugby player
- Max Evans (Roswell), a fictional character in the American science fiction television series Roswell
- Max Evans (writer) (1924–2020), Western author
