= South Warrnambool Football Club =

South Warrnambool

Names
- Full name: South Warrnambool Football Netball Club
- Nickname: Roosters

Club details
- Founded: 1902; 124 years ago
- Colours
- Competition: Hampden FNL
- Coach: Daniel Nicolson
- Captain(s): Harry Lee, Shannon Beks
- Premierships: (13) 1940, 1954, 1964, 1969, 1974, 1990, 1991, 1994, 1996, 2006, 2011, 2023, 2024
- Ground: Friendly Societies Park

Uniforms
Home

Other information
- Official website: http://www.southwarrnamboolfnc.sportingpulse.net

The South Warrnambool Football Netball Club, nicknamed the Roosters, are an Australian rules football and netball club that competes in the Hampden Football League. The club is based in the regional Victorian city of Warrnambool and has played in the Hampden Football League since 1933.

== History ==
Believed to have formed in 1902, the club initially played in the Warrnambool District Football Association competition in 1904 against Allensford, Rainbow and West End. In 1918, South Warrnambool and Railways Football Club merged and won the Warrnambool District Football Association premiership, defeating Koroit. In 1919,1920 and 1921 Roy Cazaly coached South Warrnambool side during the finals series. It was Cazaly who saw the immense talent in Colin Watson and enticed him to try out with the St. Kilda Football Club.

When the Warrnambool DFA decided to merge with the Corangamite FA to form the Western District Football Association in 1924, South Warrnambool merged with Warrnambool City to form the Warrnambool Football Club. The newly-merged club, “Warrnambool”, won the inaugural flag. Three years later, in 1927, South Warrnambool reformed as a standalone club to provide stronger opposition to the Warrnambool team and entered the Western District Football Association.

The admission of Hamilton into the Western District FA in 1926, caused additional traveling costs and problems with extra time away from home. In 1926, Camperdown members joined the Colac Football Association, only to rejoin the Western District FA after a couple of seasons. In 1928, the league played zone football, a fixture for eastern clubs and one for the western clubs, with finals between the top clubs at the end of the year.

In 1930, delegates voted to end zone football and have just one fixture covering all clubs. The Hampden Football League was formed in 1930, when the four founding clubs broke away from the Western District FL. Terang and Camperdown did not want to continue to travel to Hamilton because their players were farmers who could not spend all day away from the farm to play football. Mortlake agreed with Camperdown and Terang and resigned from the WDFL; Cobden requested admittance to the new league. The Western District FL countered by admitting Portland to the competition in 1930. This incurred extra travelling costs and it was noticeable that gate takings were down.

South Warrnambool were runners up in 1931 and again in 1932 in the Western District Football Association. In 1933, South Warrnambool and Warrnambool joined the Hampden Football League, as takings at the gate had been greater when playing Camperdown or Terang that against any team in the WDFL.

== Football Competitions Timeline ==
- 1902 to 1903 – SWFC established. Played friendly matches against other local teams
- 1904 – Warrnambool District Football Association
- 1905 to 1911 – Did not compete in any formal competition, but played friendly matches against other local teams
- 1912 to 1914 – Western District Football Association
- 1915 to 1917 – Club in recess due to World War I
- 1918 to 1923 – Warrnambool District Football Association
- 1927 to 1932 – Western District Football Association
- 1933 to 1940 – Hampden Football League
- 1941 to 1945 – Club in recess, due to World War II
- 1941 – Warrnambool District Football Association (South Warrnambool Reserves)
- 1946 to 2019 – Hampden Football League

== Football Premierships ==
Seniors

- Western District Football Association
  - 1912 – South Warrnambool: 7.8 – 50 defeated Koroit: 3.18 – 36. Captained by Quinn.
  - 1924 – Warrnambool (South Warrnambool/Warrnambool City): 13.10 – 88 defeated Terang: 11.11 – 77
- Warrnambool District Football Association
  - 1918 – South Warrnambool / Railways FC: 7.13 – 55 defeated Koroit: 6.4 – 40. Best on Ground – Colin_Watson
  - 1921 – South Warrnambool: 10.13 – 73 defeated Koroit: 7.16 – 58 SWFC won the Sheldrick – Gill Curry Trophies.
- Hampden Football League (11)
  - 1940 – South Warrnambool: 11.21 – 87 defeated Warrnambool: 10.7 – 67
  - 1954 – South Warrnambool: 9.8 – 62 defeated Terang: 5.8 – 38
  - 1964 – South Warrnambool: 13.13 – 91 defeated Colac 10.5 – 65
  - 1969 – South Warrnambool: 12.17 – 89 defeated Mortlake 12.16 – 88
  - 1974 – South Warrnambool: 7.8 – 50 defeated Camperdown 6.6 – 42
  - 1990 – South Warrnambool: 23.21 – 159 defeated Colac 5.8 – 38
  - 1991 – South Warrnambool: 2.6 – 18 defeated Terang 1.6 – 12
  - 1994 – South Warrnambool: 19.15 – 129 defeated Camperdown 12.15 – 87
  - 1996 – South Warrnambool: 18.7 – 115 defeated Terang 14.9 – 93
  - 2006 – South Warrnambool: 17.15 – 117 defeated Camperdown 13.8 – 86
  - 2011 – South Warrnambool: 11.14 – 80 defeated Warrnambool: 5.9 – 39
  - 2023 – South Warrnambool: 9.8 – 62 defeated North Warrnambool: 6.5 – 41
  - 2024 – South Warrnambool: 4.5 – 29 defeated North Warrnambool: 3.10 – 28

Reserves

- Hampden Football League (20)
  - 1962, 1964, 1967, 1968, 1971, 1974, 1975, 1976, 1983, 1986, 1989, 1990, 1996, 1998, 2001, 2004, 2006, 2008, 2011, 2023

Thirds / Under 18's

- Hampden Football League (16)
  - 1972, 1973, 1980, 1984, 1987, 1997, 1999, 2001, 2002, 2003, 2004, 2006, 2010, 2014, 2018, 2019,

== Football Runners Up ==
Seniors

- Western District Football Association
  - 1913 – Warrnambool: 8.17 – 65 defeated South Warrnambool: 5.9 – 39
  - 1931 – Warrnambool: 6.6 – 42 defeated South Warrnambool: 5.10 – 40 (Best on Ground: Colin Watson)
  - 1932 – Hamilton: 19.18 – 132 defeated South Warrnambool: 18.16 – 124
- Warrnambool District Football Association
  - 1923 – Koroit: 13.10 – 88 defeated South Warrnambool: 6.9 – 45
- Hampden Football League (10)
  - 1933 – Cobden: 6.13 – 49 def South Warrnambool: 6.6 – 42
  - 1939 – Warrnambool: 14.19 – 103 def South Warrnambool: 14.11 – 95
  - 1948 – Cobden: 11.13 – 79 def South Warrnambool: 10.6 – 66
  - 1985 – Colac – Coragulac: 22.14 – 146 def South Warrnambool: 14.6 – 90
  - 1988 – Warrnambool: 12.10 – 82 def South Warrnambool: 10.15 – 75
  - 1989 – Warrnambool: 21.14 – 140 def South Warrnambool: 11.11 – 77
  - 1992 – Warrnambool: 20.12 – 132 def South Warrnambool: 13.12 – 90
  - 1995 – Terang: 18.12 – 120 def South Warrnambool: 14.11 – 95
  - 1998 – Cobden: 15.6 – 96 def South Warrnambool: 11.10 – 76
  - 2010 – Warrnambool: 8.13 – 61 def South Warrnambool: 5.14 – 44

Reserves

- Hampden Football League (9)
  - 1963, 1965, 1973, 1988, 1997, 2003, 2010, 2017, 2018

Under 18 / Thirds

- Hampden Football League (17)
  - 1963, 1968, 1974, 1976, 1977, 1982, 1985, 1986, 1988, 1989, 1992, 1993, 1994, 1998, 2000, 2009, 2015,

== Football League – Best and Fairest Awards ==
Seniors

- Western District Football Association
  - 1930 – Colin Watson

Hampden Football League

- Maskell Medallist
  - 1949 – Max Evans
  - 1950 – Ray Lee
  - 1954, 1955 & 1957 – Ron Hoy
  - 1964 – Gary Hughson
  - 1981 – Tom Smith
  - 1989 – Phil Bradmore
  - 2005 – Ben Kilday
  - 2017 – Manny Sandow

Reserves

== VFL/AFL players ==
The following footballers played with South Warrnambool prior to making their VFL / AFL debut.

- 1920 – Jimmy Milne – St Kilda
- 1920 – Colin Watson – St Kilda
- 1933 – Les Jago – St Kilda
- 1945 – Clinton Wines – Carlton
- 1949 – Jack O'Rourke – Richmond
- 1955 – Frank Primmer – South Melbourne
- 1955 – Ron Hoy – Hawthorn
- 1958 – Bob Nisbet – Hawthorn
- 1960 – Frank Johnson – South Melbourne
- 1962 – Brian McMahon – St Kilda
- 1965 – Denis Hughson – Fitzroy
- 1965 – Terry Broad – Carlton
- 1965 – Kevin Neale – St Kilda
- 1968 – Phil Stevens – Geelong, St Kilda
- 1970 – Alan Thompson – Fitzroy
- 1970 – John Burns – North Melbourne, Geelong
- 1976 – Jim Board – Collingwood
- 1977 – Wayne Duke – Fitzroy
- 1977 – Ricky Barham – Collingwood
- 1980 – Terry Domburg Collingwood
- 1985 – David Crutchfield – Fitzroy
- 1986 – Darren Bolden – Fitzroy
- 1988 – Wayne Schwass – North Melbourne , Sydney
- 1990 – Leon Cameron – Western Bulldogs
- 1990 – Richard Umbers – Brisbane Bears
- 1991 – Stephen Anderson – Collingwood
- 1998 – James Rahilly – Geelong
- 2000 – Jonathan Brown – Brisbane Lions
- 2002 – Matt Maguire – St Kilda, Brisbane Lions
- 2003 – Brent Moloney – Geelong, Melbourne, Brisbane Lions
- 2013 – Sam Dwyer – Collingwood
- 2014 – Louis Herbert – Gold Coast
- 2017 – Hugh McCluggage – Brisbane Lions
- 2021 – Jamarra Ugle-Hagan – Western Bulldogs
- 2025 – Will White (Australian footballer) – Carlton
