= Bulletin =

Bulletin or The Bulletin may refer to:

== Periodicals (newspapers, magazines, journals) ==
- Bulletin (online newspaper), a Swedish online newspaper
- The Bulletin (Australian periodical), an Australian magazine (1880–2008)
  - Bulletin Debate, a famous dispute from 1892 to 1893 between Henry Lawson and Banjo Paterson
- The Bulletin (alternative weekly), an alternative weekly published in Montgomery County, Texas, U.S.
- The Bulletin (Bend), a daily newspaper in Bend, Oregon, U.S.
- The Bulletin (Belgian magazine), a weekly English-language magazine published in Brussels, Belgium
- The Bulletin (Philadelphia newspaper), a newspaper in Philadelphia, Pennsylvania, U.S. (2004–2009)
- The Bulletin (Norwich)
- London Bulletin, surrealist monthly magazine (1938–1940)
- The Morning Bulletin, a daily newspaper published in Rockhampton, Queensland, Australia since 1861
- Philadelphia Bulletin, a newspaper published in Philadelphia, U.S. (1847–1982)
- San Francisco Evening Bulletin, founded as the Daily Evening Bulletin (1855–1929)
- Many organizations or associations maintain a bulletin for members, including:
- Annual Bulletin (disambiguation), the name of several publications
- Commercial Bulletin (disambiguation), the name of several publications

== Other uses ==
- Bulletin Building, Rockhampton, listed on the Queensland Heritage Register in Australia
- Bulletin Building, Washington, D.C., listed on the National Register of Historic Places in Washington, D.C.
- News bulletin, a broadcast report on news of extreme urgency that interrupts normal programming
- Bulletin (news programme), a British TV programme now known as Tyne and Wear News
- Bulletin (service), an online platform by Facebook
- Slang for a billboard

== See also ==
- Bulletin board (disambiguation)
