= Bob Nisbet =

Australian rules footballer (born 1936)

Personal information
- Full name: Bob Nisbet
- Born: 15 February 1936 (age 90)
- Original team: South Warrnambool
- Height: 188 cm (6 ft 2 in)
- Weight: 76 kg (168 lb)

Playing career^{1}
Years	Club	Games (Goals)
1958–59	Hawthorn	16 (15)
- ^{1} Playing statistics correct to the end of 1959.

Bob Nisbet (born 15 February 1936) is a former Australian rules footballer who played with Hawthorn in the Victorian Football League (VFL).

Recruited from the country club of South Warrnambool, Nisbet followed the steps of teammate Ron Hoy to Hawthorn. While Hoy played only one game then returned to Warrnambool, Nisbet stayed in Melbourne. After he left the Hawks, Nisbet with a posse of others went down to Mordialloc which was a fairly strong team in the (VFA) in those days.

He won the club best and fairest there and was elected vice-captain. He spent three years there and then coached Mount Waverley in the South East Suburban league to a premiership and finished in the four a couple of times.
