= Terry Board (footballer, born 1945) =

Australian rules footballer (1945–2019)

Personal information
- Full name: Terrence James Board
- Born: 5 November 1945
- Died: 23 November 2019 (aged 74); Warrnambool, Australia
- Original team: South Warrnambool (HFL)
- Height: 173 cm (5 ft 8 in)
- Weight: 73 kg (161 lb)

Playing career^{1}
Years	Club	Games (Goals)
1965–68	Carlton	41 (43)
- ^{1} Playing statistics correct to the end of 1968.

Terrence James Board (5 November 1945 – 23 November 2019) was an Australian rules footballer who played with Carlton in the Victorian Football League (VFL).

After finishing his career at Collingwood, Board became playing coach at Western Border Football League club North Gambier.

His brother Jim Board played football for Collingwood and his son Terry Jr played for Fitzroy.

Terry Board died on 23 November 2019, at the age of 74.
