= Richard Umbers (disambiguation) =

Richard Umbers may refer to:

- Richard Umbers (bishop) (born 1971), auxiliary bishop of the Roman Catholic Archdiocese of Sydney
- Richard Umbers (footballer) (born 1968), Australian footballer
