= Kate Board =

English pilot, the world's first female qualified Zeppelin pilot

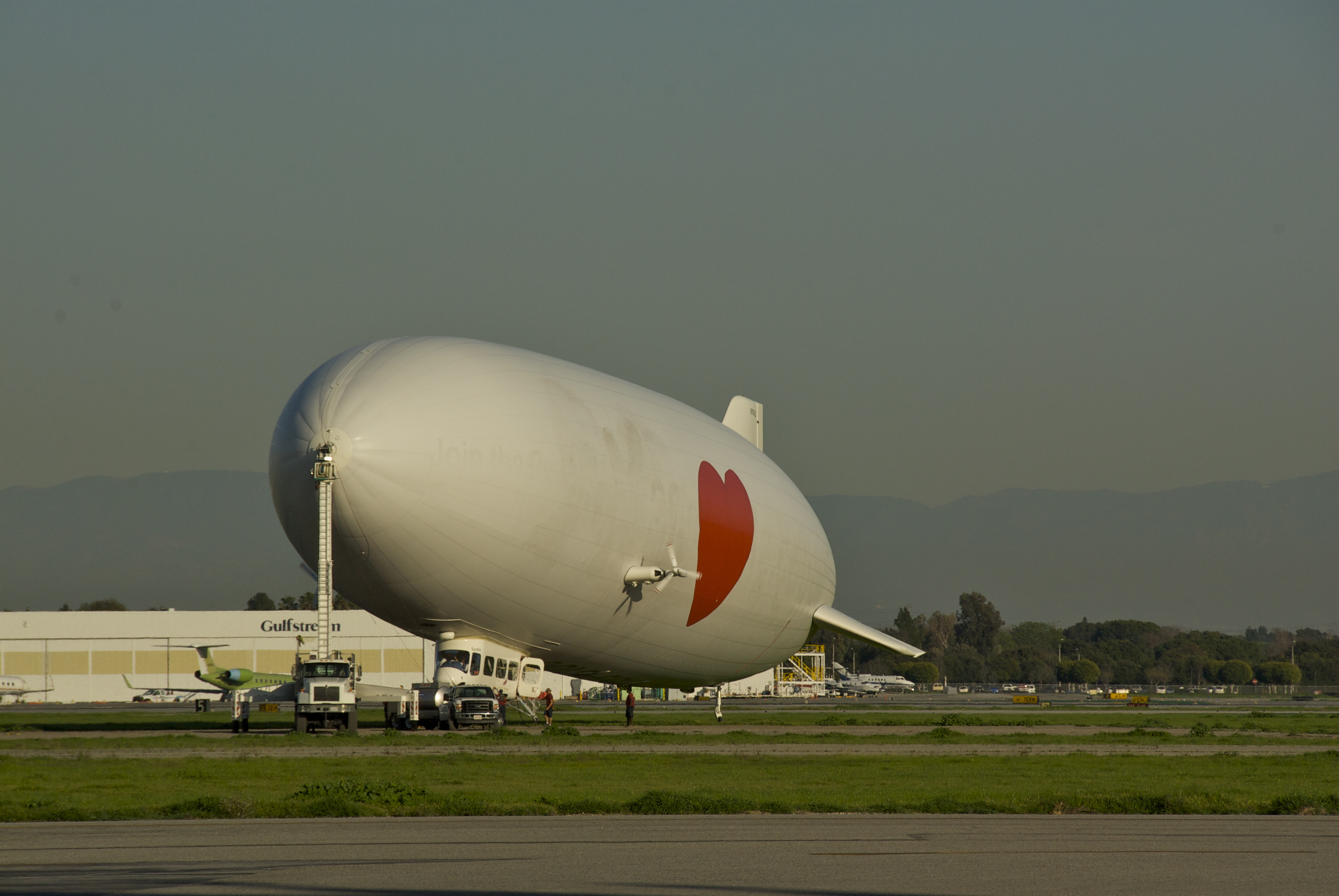
The Zeppelin NT Eureka which Board flew for Airship Ventures, seen in 2010

Katharine Board, known as Kate Board, is an English pilot, the world's first qualified female pilot of Zeppelin NT semi-rigid airships, the modern smaller version of the huge interwar Zeppelins.

She started to learn to fly when her father gave her five hours of flying lessons for her 19th birthday, and after this worked at her local flying club, being paid in flying time. Her first flying job was with Virgin Balloon Flights, and Virgin subsequently offered her a job flying blimps, for which she trained at Kissimmee, Florida, in the United States. In 2005 she was flying an American Blimp Corporation A-60+ for Lightship Group, and was one of only about 100 active airship pilots in the United States. She had logged about 3,000 flying hours, of which only 250 hours was in planes, the remainder in airships.

By 2011 Board was working for Airship Ventures who offered "Zeppelin tours of San Francisco Bay, Los Angeles and the Monterey Coast" in their craft Eureka, and she was described as the only female Zeppelin NT pilot in the world. She had logged more than 5,000 flight hours and was certified by the CAA, LBA and FAA as a commercial airship pilot.

By 2012 she had left Airship Ventures to fly a Zeppelin based at Friedrichshafen, Germany, the only other Zeppelin still flying. A second woman, American Andrea Deyling, qualified as a Zeppelin pilot that year.
