= Cooks Source infringement controversy =

Online copyright dispute

The Cooks Source infringement controversy is an Internet phenomenon which occurred in November 2010, when Cooks Source, a free, advertising-supported publication distributed in the New England region of the United States, became the center of a copyright infringement dispute after the magazine reprinted an online article without permission of the author. The controversy was fueled by social media and crowdsourced investigations finding additional alleged infringement and plagiarism. The incident became an international topic of news and analysis, which expanded to become an internet meme. On the issue of copyright, the incident illustrates that "masses of Internet users are very good at finding examples of copyright infringement, which counterbalances how easy the Internet has made plagiarism in the first place." At the same time, the response by the Cooks Source editor "may well become a digital textbook example of how not to respond to grievances in the internet age." The incident was named Journalistic Error of the Year for 2010 by Craig Silverman on his website Regret the Error. The fallout from the controversy drove Cooks Source out of business within two weeks of it breaking in full.

== Background ==
As reported by Dan Crowley of the local Daily Hampshire Gazette, Cooks Source was founded in 1997 by Judith D. Griggs, a former town planner and conservation agent, who had previously been art director and editor of several small magazines. The magazine stated its goal was "to help educate readers about sustainable sources of foods and products, farms, cooking, restaurants and businesses," and to provide a marketing tool for small businesses and farms which create and sell food for local businesses and consumers. At the time of the incident, Cooks Source was published by Cooks Source Publications in the second-floor office of a rented duplex in Sunderland, Massachusetts, almost 40 miles (64 km) north of Springfield. Griggs, who was 59 years old at the time of the incident, hand-delivered the monthly publication with her adult daughter along a 2,000-mile distribution route to locations in western New England, including Massachusetts, Connecticut, Vermont, and some of New Hampshire. The magazine's circulation varied, but it was under 10,000 a month.

Griggs rose to internet notoriety on November 4, 2010, after it became known that an article published on page 10 in the October 2010 Cooks Source issue infringed on the copyright of Monica Gaudio, the piece's author. In 2005, Gaudio had published the copyrighted piece under the title "A Tale of Two Tarts" on a website devoted to medieval cookery.

Gaudio was credited in Cooks Source for the 1,300-word piece, which was retitled "As American As Apple Pie — Isn't!" and was revised from Gaudio's original in places. Griggs neither paid Gaudio nor notified her when the piece had run. Gaudio notified Griggs of the infringement and asked for an apology and a small donation to the Columbia School of Journalism (Gaudio chose the Columbia School of Journalism so Cooks Source could easily comply with her request; she has stated that she is neither a journalist herself nor is she affiliated with that institution). The ensuing response by Griggs "has become the stuff of internet legend," and said in part:

But honestly Monica, the web is considered 'public domain' and you should be happy we just didn't 'lift' your whole article and put someone else's name on it! It happens a lot, clearly more than you are aware of, especially on college campuses, and the workplace. If you took offence and are unhappy, I am sorry, but you as a professional should know that the article we used written by you was in very bad need of editing, and is much better now than was originally. Now it will work well for your portfolio. For that reason, I have a bit of a difficult time with your requests for monetary gain, albeit for such a fine (and very wealthy!) institution. We put some time into rewrites, you should compensate me! I never charge young writers for advice or rewriting poorly written pieces, and have many who write for me... ALWAYS for free!

== Online response ==
Griggs' response, particularly her statement that all web content is considered public domain, was publicized by a number of online celebrities, including Nick Mamatas, Wil Wheaton, John Scalzi, Neil Gaiman, and Warren Ellis. The tone of Griggs' response and her erroneous claims led to what Gaudio described as "nerd rage". The magazine's Facebook page received a slew of mocking messages. In less than 24 hours, a list of the magazine's advertisers was generated and the advertisers contacted, with secondary campaigns beginning to reward advertisers who had pulled their ads from the magazine. One blog campaigned for making "griggs" a verb meaning "to take something without permission then demand compensation from the victim". The hashtags #buthonestlymonica and #crookssource went viral on Twitter.

Cooks Source's web hosting company, Intuit, experienced an outage on November 4, prompting speculation that a denial-of-service attack aimed at Cooks Source may have been the reason. Several parodic Twitter accounts and a bogus Facebook page titled Cooks Source Mag were created on November 5, containing additional inflammatory statements purportedly by the magazine staff. It also inspired editorials by Robert X. Cringely and John Birmingham, Downfall parodies, a tribute song, and a satirical proposed apology composed entirely of unattributed famous quotations. Cringely later named it fourth among the Top 10 Dumbest Tech Moves of 2010.

Gaudio said she never intended the online response to go as far as it had, but she expected mainstream media coverage once Gaiman re-tweeted it. She said she knew one or more Cooks Source advertisers had been contacted, but she did not intend for any small businesses or people to be harmed or harassed. She said she found many of the Facebook comments amusing.

== Response by Cooks Source ==
Gaudio did not receive a direct response from Griggs or Cooks Source Magazine in relation to the affair after Gaudio posted about their email communication.

On November 9, the Cooks Source website was updated with an unsigned statement indicating Cooks Source had complied with Gaudio's requests for redress and were changing their business practices. Gaudio was unable to confirm immediately if the requested donation had in fact been made. NPR pop culture writer/host Linda Holmes characterized the statement as "a very strange semi-apology", adding, "It actually sounds a lot like the e-mail Gaudio got in the first place: defiant, sure of its correctness, and, in the end, kind of baffling." New York declared the publication's apparent retention of Griggs "a victory for passive-aggressive e-mail writers everywhere." The Cooks Source statement was quickly parodied and mocked. John Scalzi graded the apology a D+, adding, "This is the apology of someone who is sorry she got caught, not the apology of someone who feels she has done wrong." Robert X. Cringely called the statement "one of the oddest things I've ever read."

In her first interview after the incident, Griggs said she had received hundreds of emails and disconnected her phone after getting over 100 calls. Though the November issue was scheduled for delivery, Griggs said, "I don't know if I'm going to continue Cooks Source. At this point, it's looking doubtful." The article elaborated that Cooks Source commonly received cookbooks and recipes from publishers and that its content was routinely duplicated from those sources, sometimes with express permission. Shortly after the interview's publication, Gaudio was able to confirm Griggs' donation, and therefore considered the matter "all resolved, at least to my satisfaction."

On November 17, 2010, the Cooks Source homepage was updated again, with a personal statement from Griggs which claimed Gaudio's email was "antagonistic and just plain rude", that Gaudio had neglected to post "nice" things Griggs had said in her email alongside the rude things, and that Griggs had offered to compensate Gaudio for the article, but that Gaudio "never gave [her] a chance" to address the issue. Griggs reiterated that she would likely close down Cooks Source due to the backlash. Gaudio responded by posting her side of her correspondence with Griggs; she explained that she was unable to post Griggs' portion of the email conversation due to Griggs holding copyright on her own words. The Cooks Source and Travel Source homepages were later taken offline completely, and Facebook deleted the related pages originally created by Griggs.

== Analysis and additional infringement allegations ==
The incident prompted editorials from a range of journalists including Melissa Block of NPR's All Things Considered, Zachary Hunchar of Technorati, and CNN's Eatocracy. Journalist Ivor Tossell opined that this may be the first major Facebook-based internet vigilantism where many participants used their real names instead of remaining anonymous. He noted that Griggs resembled a cartoonish "pantomime villain", and her passive-aggressive attitude, and not the infringement itself, caused the response. TechRepublic offered tips to avoid having one's online work used without credit. One author compared the incident to the 2008 sourcing dispute that led to the demise of The Bulletin, a small Texas alternative weekly. Glenn Fleishman wrote that "regardless of the provenance of the email, it was scary to watch the net awake as one."

The NPR program On the Media discussed the episode as an example of how quickly and severely anger can spread on the Internet, noting that the episode had made the phrase "but honestly, Monica" into an internet meme and had spawned the verb "to Griggs", defined as "to use content on the Web without permission, then request payment from the original author for rewrites and editing." Paul Bradshaw reviewed professional options for Griggs that might have mitigated the impact of the negative response. Joseph P. Kahn used the Cooks Source incident to illustrate how senders should have no expectation of privacy once something is electronically transmitted to a recipient, especially if it is potentially controversial or embarrassing.

After Gaudio posted Griggs' email, online investigators created a spreadsheet in Google Sheets and compiled almost 170 instances where Cooks Source appeared to have lifted copyrighted material, including text and images, from other sources, "including NPR, Hallmark and the website of Food Network personality Paula Deen." Blogger Edward Champion contacted the original authors or publishers of several pieces published in Cooks Source and confirmed that many of them had been used without permission. NPR sent the magazine a cease-and-desist letter.
