= Brian McMahon (footballer) =

Australian rules footballer

Personal information
- Full name: Brian J. McMahon
- Born: 15 July 1939
- Original team: South Warrnambool
- Height: 183 cm (6 ft 0 in)
- Weight: 80 kg (176 lb)

Playing career^{1}
Years	Club	Games (Goals)
1962–1963	St Kilda	10 (0)
- ^{1} Playing statistics correct to the end of 1963.

Brian McMahon (born 15 July 1939) is a former Australian rules footballer who played with St Kilda in the Victorian Football League (VFL).

McMahon was recruited from South Warrnambool and played 10 senior games for St Kilda, in the 1962 and 1963 VFL seasons.
