= Embarkation (disambiguation) =

Embarkation is the process of boarding or loading of a ship or aircraft.

Embarkation, embarkment or embark may also refer to:

- Embark (transit authority), the public transit authority of the Oklahoma City metropolitan area, Oklahoma, United States
- Embarked military force
- The Embark Initiative, an Irish cycle-2 and cycle-3 tertiary education research initiative of IRCSET
- Embarkation fee, an airport service charge
- Embarkation (John McNeil album), a 1978 jazz album by John McNeil
- Embark Veterinary, an American canine genomics and biotechnology company

== See also ==
- Debark (disambiguation)
- Boarding (disambiguation)
