= Boarding =

Boarding may refer to:

- Boarding, used in the sense of "room and board", i.e. lodging and meals as in a:
  - Boarding house
  - Boarding school
- Boarding (horses) (also known as a livery yard, livery stable, or boarding stable), is a stable where horse owners pay a weekly or monthly fee to keep their horse
- Boarding (ice hockey), a penalty called when an offending player violently pushes or checks an opposing player into the boards of the hockey rink
- Boarding (transport), transferring people onto a vehicle
- Naval boarding, the forcible insertion of personnel onto a naval vessel
- Waterboarding, a form of torture
- Boarding may "describe emergency department patients whose evaluation is complete and for whom the decision has been made to either admit or transfer, but for whom there is no available bed."

== See also ==
- Board (disambiguation)
- Embarkment (disambiguation)
