= Wayne Duke (footballer) =

Australian rules footballer (1955–2024)

Personal information
- Full name: Christopher Wayne Duke
- Born: 10 June 1955
- Died: 2 September 2024 (aged 69)
- Original team: South Warrnambool
- Height: 197 cm (6 ft 6 in)
- Weight: 93 kg (205 lb)

Playing career^{1}
Years	Club	Games (Goals)
1977–1979	Fitzroy	9 (1)
- ^{1} Playing statistics correct to the end of 1979.

Christopher Wayne Duke (10 June 1955 – 2 September 2024) was an Australian rules footballer, who played for the Fitzroy Football Club in the Victorian Football League (VFL) and the East Perth and Claremont Football Clubs in the West Australian Football League. Duke died on 2 September 2024, at the age of 69.
