= Debark =

Debark or debarking may refer to:

- Disembarkation, to leave or offload a ship
- Devocalization of dogs to reduce the volume of their barking sound
- Debarking (lumber), removing bark from lumber

== See also ==
- Debarq, a town in Ethiopia
- Embarkment (disambiguation)
- Girdling, or ring-barking
