= Deutsche Zeppelin-Reederei =

German airline

Deutsche Zeppelin-Reederei (DZR) (2001–present)
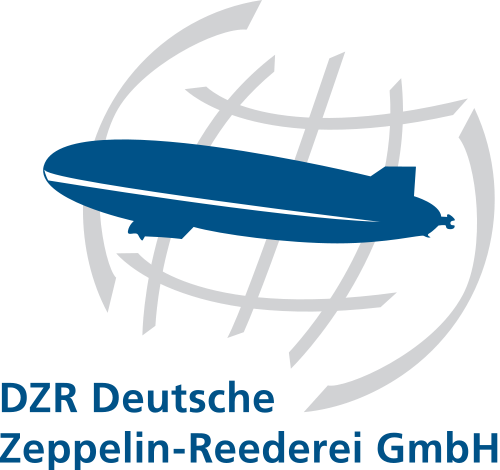
- Founded: January 2001
- Commenced operations: 15 August 2001
- Fleet size: 2
- Destinations: 12 scheduled tour routes charter service
- Parent company: Zeppelin Luftschifftechnik
- Headquarters: Friedrichshafen, Germany
- Website: http://www.zeppelinflug.de

Deutsche Zeppelin-Reederei (DZR) (1935–1940)
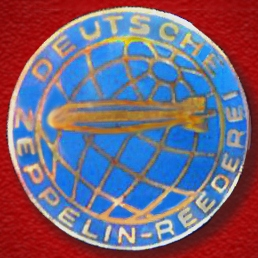
IATA	ICAO	Call sign
—	—	DEKKA
- Founded: 22 March 1935
- Ceased operations: 20 August 1939
- Fleet size: 3
- Destinations: Germany; South America; North America
- Parent company: Luftschiffbau Zeppelin; Deutsche Luft Hansa; Reichsluftfahrtministerium
- Headquarters: Frankfurt, Germany
- Key people: Hugo Eckener, Chairman; Ernst Lehmann, CEO

Deutsche Zeppelin-Reederei (lit. 'German Zeppelin Airship Company'), abbreviated DZR, is a German limited-liability company that operates commercial passenger zeppelin flights. The current incarnation of the DZR was founded in 2001 and is based in Friedrichshafen. It is a subsidiary of Zeppelin Luftschifftechnik and operates Zeppelin NT "Next Generation" airships. By 2009 the DZR had transported over 55,000 passengers. As of 2012 the DZR flies a schedule of 12 tour routes between March and November in Southern Germany. The company also operates flights to other selected cities as well as charter flights.

In the mid-1930s, the DZR was a commercial airline based in Frankfurt that operated zeppelins in regular transatlantic revenue service, including the famous LZ 129 Hindenburg. Following the Hindenburg disaster in 1937 the DZR stopped transatlantic service, although it launched a new airship in 1938 and had another on order. Plans for more operations ended at the outbreak of World War II and its remaining two zeppelins were dismantled and scrapped in 1940. Today's DZR sees itself as the successor of this original airline and is incorporated under the same name.

== History ==
=== DELAG (1909–1935) ===
DELAG (German: Deutsche Luftschiffahrts-Aktiengesellschaft; English: German Airship Transportation Corporation Ltd) was founded on 16 November 1909 as a subsidiary of the Luftschiffbau Zeppelin Corporation to commercialize airship travel. It became the world's first passenger airline in revenue service with the launch of LZ 7 Deutschland in 1910. While DELAG's initial flights were primarily sightseeing tours, by 1919 it was operating a regular schedule between Berlin and Friedrichshafen with a stop at Munich. Between 1910 and the outbreak of World War I DELAG transported over 34,028 passengers on 1,588 commercial flights.

=== The first DZR (1935–1940) ===
Deutsche Zeppelin-Reederei flag, 1935

==== Founding ====
The creation of the DZR as successor to DELAG occurred for both political and business reasons. Luftschiffbau Zeppelin (LZ) chairman Hugo Eckener, who had intended to run against Hitler in the 1932 presidential election, was already disliked by the Nazis. When Eckener later resisted the new Nazi government's efforts to use zeppelins for propaganda purposes, Reich Minister of Aviation Hermann Göring insisted that a new agency be created to extend Party control over LZ Group. A personal rivalry between Göring and Propaganda Minister Joseph Goebbels also played a role. To complicate matters further, the Luftschiffbau was a loss-making concern and needed cash investment, in particular to complete construction of the Hindenburg.

Deutsche Zeppelin-Reederei was therefore incorporated on 22 March 1935 as a joint venture between Zeppelin Luftschiffbau, the Ministry of Aviation, and Deutsche Luft Hansa. The LZ Group's capital contribution came primarily from its two airships LZ 127 Graf Zeppelin and LZ 129 Hindenburg, the latter of which was not yet complete on the date of incorporation. Nearly all of the rest was an infusion of cash by the Air Ministry and DLH. In exchange for this, the DZR agreed to ownership apportioned as follows:

DZR shareholders, 1935	Reichsmark (millions)
Luftschiffbau Zeppelin GmbH (LZ Group)	5.7
Deutsche Lufthansa AG (DLH)	0.4
Reichsluftfahrtministerium (RLM) *shares held in trust by DLH	3.45
Total capital	9.55

The first chief executive officer of DLZ was Ernst Lehmann and Hugo Eckener was appointed chairman, a position he accepted because it left him with a degree of influence over the zeppelins. Despite Nazi pressure, the DZR's operating routine was businesslike. The board of directors included Albert Hofmann Mühlig (RLM), Carl August Freiherr von Gablenz (DLH) and Martin Vronsky (DLH). One of their first tasks was a complete reorganization of the transatlantic travel agency system in Germany, which was then a monopoly run by the Hamburg America Line (HAPAG).

==== Early success (1935–1937) ====
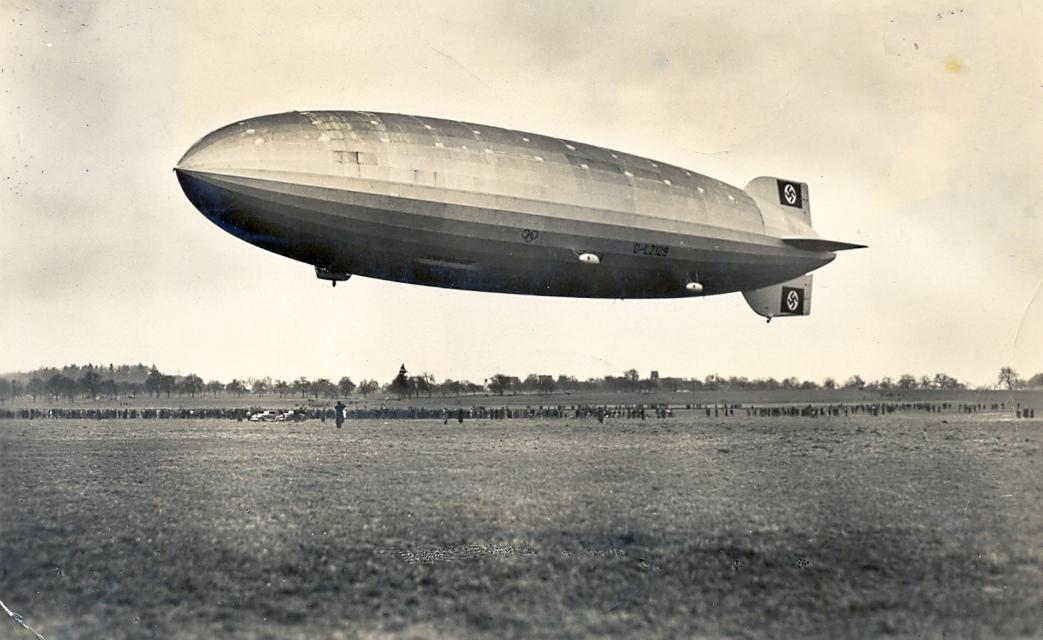
Demonstration flight of LZ 129 before it received the name Hindenburg, 1936

The DZR took over the South American service of the LZ 127 Graf Zeppelin on 22 March 1935. On 19 March 1936 the airship LZ 129 Hindenburg was licensed to carry passengers and handed over to the DZR, allowing the airline to maintain regular South and North American routes. Construction began at the new Frankfurt Airport on a second airship hangar as well as special housing for employees. On 30 June 1936 the DZR ordered a sister ship to the Hindenburg, LZ 130 Graf Zeppelin II, for 5.5 million Reichsmark. Completion was scheduled for October 1937. Between 1935 and 1936 the company's share of revenues rose from 47 to 57 percent, allowing the Reich government to decrease financial support from 53 to 43 percent. At the start of the 1937 fiscal year, the Supervisory Board and shareholders' meeting of 16 December 1936 voted to order yet another airship (LZ 131) for the price of 6.3 million RM, demonstrating high confidence in the future.

==== Hindenburg disaster (1937) ====
On 6 May 1937 the LZ 129 Hindenburg caught fire and exploded while mooring in Lakehurst, New Jersey, killing 35 people as well as CEO Ernst Lehmann. The disaster dramatically changed the fortunes of the DZR. Hindenburg was covered by insurance of 6 million RM, which was paid in full, but the loss of future passenger revenue was not. Public confidence in Zeppelin travel had also been shattered and the LZ 127 Graf Zeppelin was immediately grounded on its return flight from Brazil on 8 May 1937.

The obvious solution was to switch the Zeppelins' lifting gas from highly flammable hydrogen to inert helium. However, helium was only produced in the United States, was extremely expensive and had been embargoed since 1927. American airships equipped with helium were also forced to conserve it at all costs, which hampered their operational characteristics. Finally, a delay by the DZR to apply for an import license during a politically favorable moment in 1938 meant that it was deprived of the gas when relations between the US and Nazi Germany deteriorated soon after. In any event, helium's high cost would probably have made future operations of the huge zeppelins unprofitable, particularly in competition with the new flying boats.

==== Last operations (1938–1939) ====
The LZ 130 Graf Zeppelin II was finally launched in September 1938. The DZR Board concluded in its annual report for 1939 that public interest in zeppelins remained strong, if they could be shown to be safe, and a series of demonstration and airmail flights were authorized by the Air Ministry and the Reichspost. One of its first flights was a medium-distance trial to Austria following the Anschluss. Over the next 11 months Graf Zeppelin II made 30 test, promotional, and propaganda tours around Europe. With the advent of World War II it flew for the last time on 20 August 1939 and never entered the transatlantic passenger service for which it was built. The fate of the DZR was decided on 4 March 1940, when Air Minister Hermann Göring ordered LZ 127, LZ 130, and the unfinished LZ 131 melted down for reuse in German military aircraft manufacturing. On 6 May 1940, a Wehrmacht demolition team destroyed the hangar complexes at Frankfurt Airport, ending the fortunes of the DZR.

=== The new DZR (2001–present) ===
Deutsche Zeppelin-Reederei GmbH (DZR) was re-established in January 2001 as a direct descendant of the original airline. The first Zeppelin NT (SN 01), a prototype registered as D-LZFN Friedrichshafen, flew a series of demonstration flights for the DZR. On 2 June 2001 it carried collector's mail, the first airship postal flight in over 70 years.

The first production Zeppelin NT airship (SN 02) was christened Bodensee on 10 August 2001 by HRH Carl, Duke of Württemberg, bearing the same name as the LZ 120 from the 1920s. Registered as D-LZZR, the Bodensee was certified for flight by the German Federal Office of Civil Aeronautics (German: Luftfahrt-Bundesamt) on 14 August and began commercial service the next day over Lake Constance. Additional tour routes were added, and flights to Berlin and Stuttgart followed in 2002.

On 8 February 2003 the second production NT airship (SN 03), registered as D-LZZF Baden-Württemberg, was certified for passenger flight. In June 2003 the DZR flew to Thuringia for the first time and in July it visited the city of Bad Homburg 90 years after the first imperial airship stopped there in 1913. In October the DZR added new scheduled destinations: Ravensburg, Salem and Neuschwanstein Castle.

In May 2003 the DZR was certified for operations under night visual flight rules (NVFR) and in March 2004 it became the first company in the world to receive certification as an airship pilot flight school. The D-LZZF Friedrichshafen prototype, used in training and charter service, went on a survey mission to South Africa for de Beers in 2005. It was irreparably damaged by a tornado while moored in Botswana in 2007 and is no longer in service. The D-LZZR Bodensee was sold to Nippon Airship Corporation in 2004 and renamed JA101Z Yokoso! Japan. That commercial service was ultimately unsuccessful and the ship was resold to the DZR in 2011. It resumed operations the under its original name in 2012.

== DZR fleet ==
Ship	Registration	Class	Year built	Years of DZR service	Notes	Image
Graf Zeppelin	D-LZ 127	Graf Zeppelin	1928	1935–1937	The first aircraft in history to fly over 1 million miles. Grounded 8 May 1937 following the Hindenburg disaster, scrapped March 1940.	
Hindenburg	D-LZ 129	Hindenburg	1936	1936–1937	35 transatlantic crossings, 63 total flights. Destroyed 6 May 1937.	
Graf Zeppelin II	D-LZ 130	Hindenburg	1938	1938–1939	30 demonstration, mail and propaganda flights around Europe. No paying passengers. Scrapped May, 1940.	
Friedrichshafen	D-LZFN	Zeppelin NT N07-100	1997	2001–2007	Prototype, pilot trainer, promotions, charter. Transferred to Africa in 2005, damaged by a tornado in 2007, dismantled.	
Bodensee	D-LZZR	Zeppelin NT N07-100	2001	2001–2004; 2012–present	Sold to Japan 2004, sold back to DZR 2011. Rebuilt as -101. Call sign changed to D-LZFN; In service	
Baden-Württemberg	D-LZZF	Zeppelin NT N07-100	2003	2003–present	Out of service, dismantled.	
Eureka	D-LZNT	Zeppelin NT N07-100	2008	2008–2012	Optioned to Airship ventures. Grounded 2012, disassembled. Rebuilt as -101 in 2019, in service with DZR	

== See also ==
- Airship Ventures
