= Darren Bolden =

Australian rules footballer

Personal information
- Full name: Darren Bolden
- Born: 28 February 1963 (age 63)
- Original team: South Warrnambool (Hampden FL)

Playing career^{1}
Years	Club	Games (Goals)
1986	Fitzroy	2 (2)
- ^{1} Playing statistics correct to the end of 1986.

Darren Bolden (born 28 February 1963) is a former Australian rules footballer who played for Fitzroy in the Victorian Football League (VFL) in 1986. He was recruited from the South Warrnambool Football Club in the Hampden Football League.
