= Commercial Bulletin =

Commercial Bulletin may refer to:

- Daily Commercial Bulletin (New York), which merged into The Journal of Commerce
- Commercial Bulletin (Boston), Boston
- Commercial Bulletin (1872), Troy, Illinois
- The Commercial Bulletin (1885–1888), Lane, Kansas
- Commercial Bulletin (1880–?), Jackson, Tennessee
- New-Orleans Commercial Bulletin, New Orleans; merged into New Orleans Price Current
- Twin City Commercial Bulletin, Minneapolis
- Daily Commercial Bulletin, Chicago, Illinois
- Daily Commercial Bulletin (St. Louis), St. Louis
- Daily Commercial Bulletin (Honolulu) (1871–1881), Honolulu
- The American Manufacturer, formerly known as Daily Commercial Bulletin and American Manufacturer

== See also ==
- Bulletin (disambiguation)
