= Annual Bulletin =

Annual Bulletin may refer to:

- Annual Bulletin (Comparative Law Bureau) (1908–1914, 1933)
- Annual Bulletin of Historical Literature, from 1912, of the Historical Association
- Annual Bulletin of the National Gallery of Victoria 1959–1966

== See also ==
- Bulletin (disambiguation)
