= Phil Stevens (footballer) =

Australian rules footballer

Personal information
- Full name: Philip B. Stevens
- Born: 14 September 1950 (age 76)
- Original team: South Warrnambool
- Height: 183 cm (6 ft 0 in)
- Weight: 86 kg (190 lb)

Playing career^{1}
| Years | Club | Games (Goals) |
| 1968–1975 | Geelong | 120 (32) |
| 1976–1979 | St Kilda | 41 (3) |
| Total | | 161 (35) |
- ^{1} Playing statistics correct to the end of 1979.

Phil Stevens (born 14 September 1950) is a former Australian rules footballer who played with Geelong and St Kilda in the Victorian Football League (VFL).

Arriving from South Warrnambool, Stevens was just 17 when he first appeared for Geelong. Worked as a primary school student teacher Although he started out as a half forward flanker, Stevens would however develop into a half back flanker, which was from where he played most of his games. He represented the VFL on one occasion.

He was captain-coach of Sandringham in the 1982 VFA season.

Stevens was the general manager of the Victorian Amateur Football Association from 1989 to 2004 and is currently Operations Manager at VRA.
