= Terry Domburg =

Australian rules footballer

Personal information
- Full name: Terry Domburg
- Born: 11 July 1960 (age 66)
- Original team: South Warrnambool
- Height: 185 cm (6 ft 1 in)
- Weight: 80 kg (176 lb)

Playing career^{1}
Years	Club	Games (Goals)
1980, 1982	Collingwood	13 (2)
- ^{1} Playing statistics correct to the end of 1982.

Terry Domburg (born 11 July 1960) is a former Australian rules footballer who played with Collingwood in the Victorian Football League (VFL).

Domburg was recruited from South Warrnambool and played seven games for Collingwood in 1980. The last of those was an elimination final, which he started from the bench. Collingwood won that match and went on to play in the grand final, but Domburg wasn't selected for the rest of the finals series.

He also didn't play senior football at Collingwood in 1981 but made six appearances in the 1982 VFL season.
