= Zeppelin NT =

Class of airship

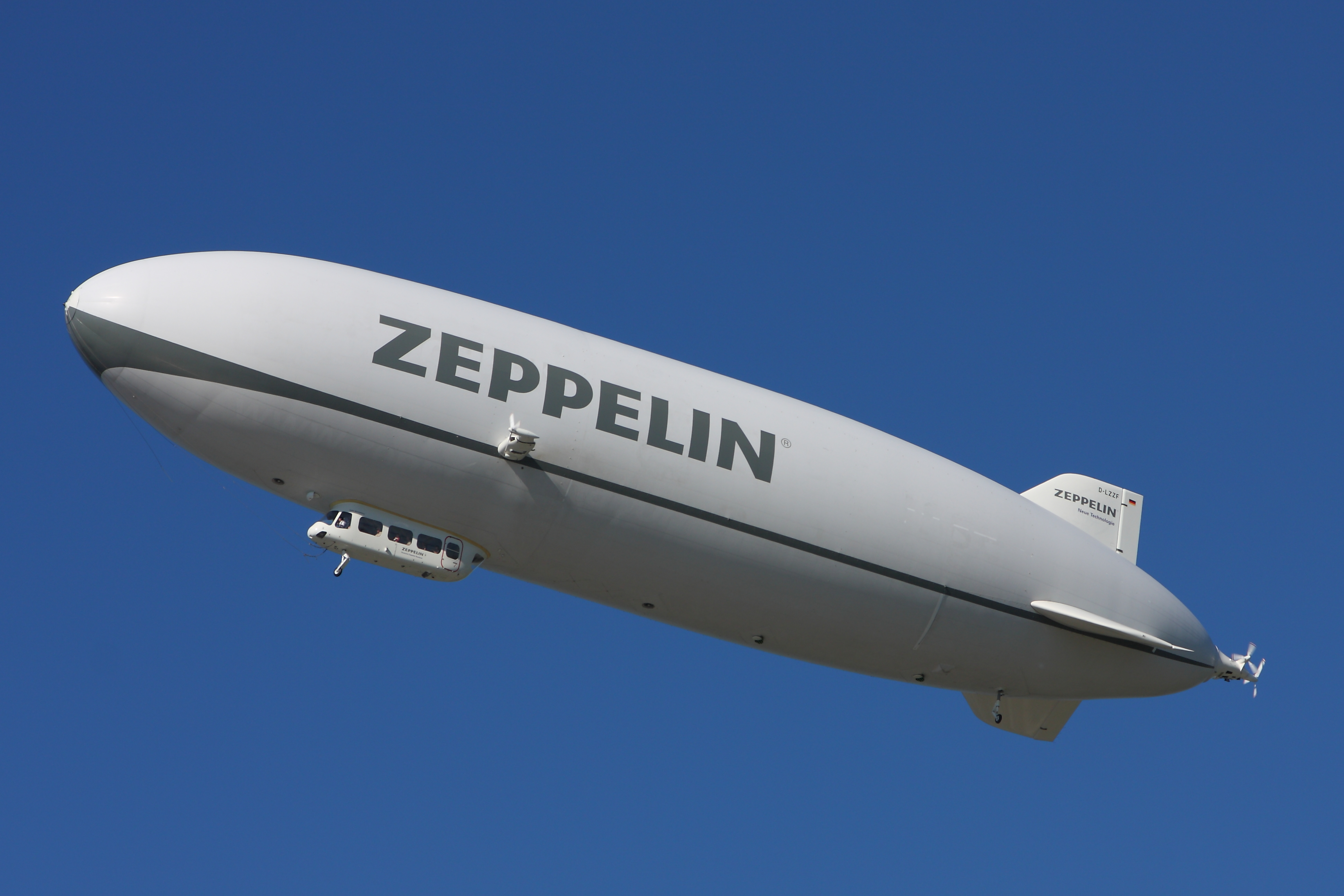
- Zeppelin NT D–LZZF in flight (2010)

General information
- Type: Utility airship
- National origin: Germany
- Manufacturer: Zeppelin Luftschifftechnik
- Number built: 7

History
- First flight: 18 September 1997

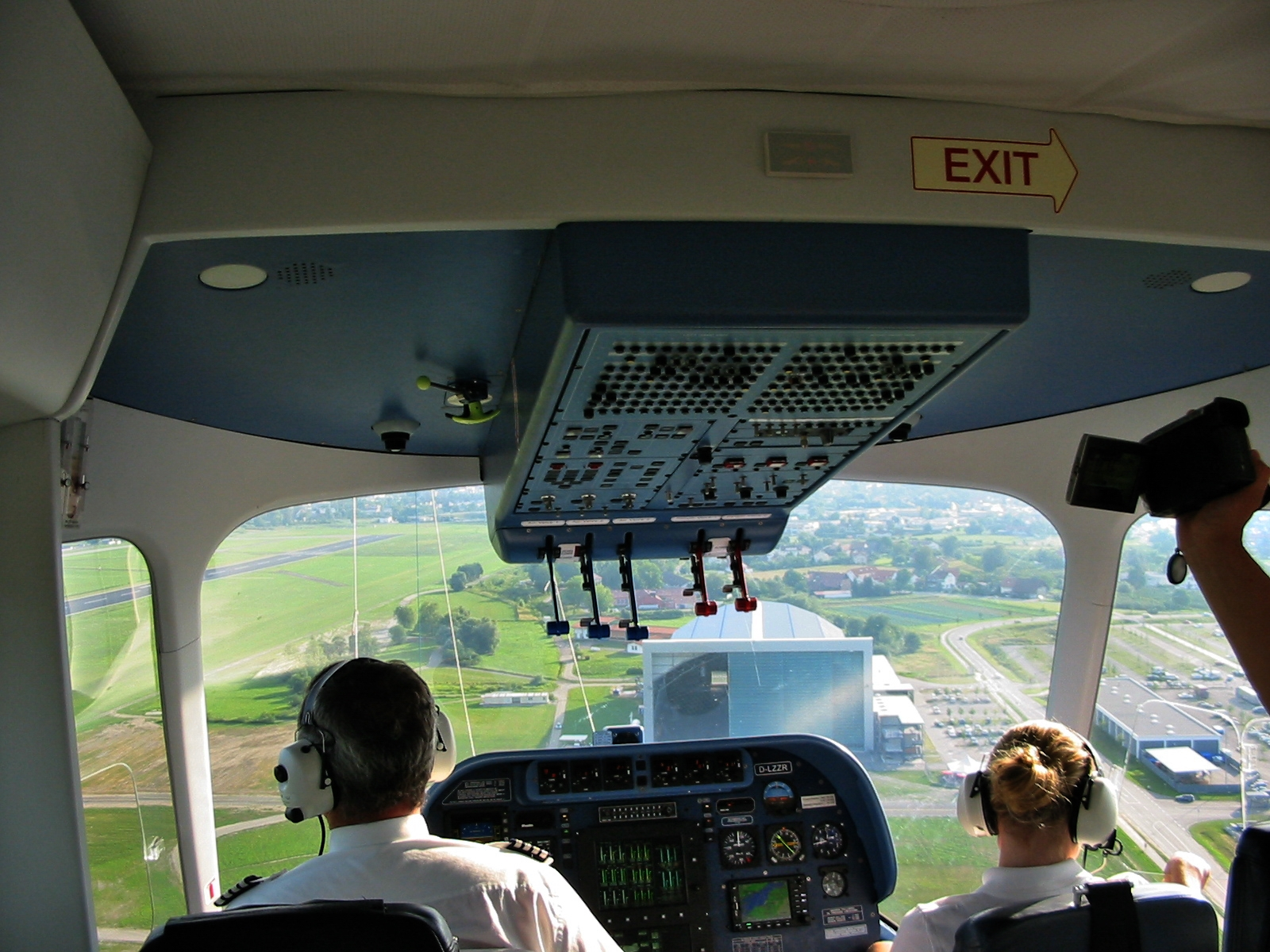
View from cockpit of a Zeppelin NT

The Zeppelin NT ("Neue Technologie", German for new technology) is a class of helium-filled airships being manufactured since the 1990s by the German company Zeppelin Luftschifftechnik GmbH (ZLT) in Friedrichshafen. The initial model is the N07. The company considers itself the successor of the companies founded by Ferdinand von Zeppelin which constructed and operated the very successful Zeppelin airships in the first third of the 20th century. There are, however, a number of notable differences between the Zeppelin NT and original Zeppelins as well as between the Zeppelin NT and usual non-rigid airships known as blimps. The Zeppelin NT is classified as a semi-rigid airship.

There are various roles for the Zeppelin NT; traditional roles have been aerial tourism purposes and for conducting passenger services. The Zeppelin NT have also been used for observation platforms, such as for aerial photographers and by television commentators covering major events. Due to their capability for low-vibration flight for up to 24 hours at a time, ZLT considers the airships suitable for research missions for environmental observation, troposphere research and natural resource prospecting. The envelope of the airship has also been used for advertising purposes.

== Development ==
The modern development and construction embodied by the Zeppelin NT had been financed by a long-standing endowment, which had been initially funded with money left over from the earlier Zeppelin company, that had been under the trusteeship of the Mayor of Friedrichshafen. A stipulation had been placed upon the endowment that limited the use of its funds to the field of airships. Over the many years, the investment value of the endowment grew to a point where it had become viable for the funds to be put to use for the purpose of designing, developing, and constructing of a new generation of Zeppelins.

In 1988, the first considerations into the technological and economic feasibility of reviving the Zeppelin industry began; this included examinations of historic Zeppelin documentation as well as current designs for airships. In December 1990, a feasibility study and accompanying market research program found an initial sales potential for around eighty Zeppelin airships for purposes such as tourism, advertising, and scientific research. In mid 1991, the newly formed development team filed several patents on various technologies that would be later used on the subsequent airship, these included propeller arrangements, structure and girder design, and ballonet implementation. In March 1991, a flyable remote control proof of concept model was demonstrated, which is claimed to have revealed excellent flight characteristics from the onset.

In September 1993, the Zeppelin Luftschifftechnik GmbH (ZLT) was founded in Friedrichshafen as a corporate spin-off of the original Zeppelin company to pursue development and production of the new generation of Zeppelins, later known as the Zeppelin NT (New Technology). By spring 1994, preparatory studies for a full-sized prototype were underway. In 1995, the Luftfahrt-Bundesamt, Germany's civil aviation authority, officially recognized ZLT as a design organisation, and approved new construction regulations for airships. In November 1995, final assembly of the first airship prototype commenced, it was promoted as being the first rigid airship to be produced by the firm since the Second World War. In July 1996, the under-construction prototype of the Zeppelin N07 was presented to the public and the media. In September 1997, the prototype performed its maiden flight at Friedrichshafen; piloted by US test pilot Scott Danneker, it flew for a total of 40 minutes.

On 8 August 1998, the Zeppelin N07 prototype performed a cross-country flight via Altenrhein, Switzerland to Echterdingen near Stuttgart, Germany; at the end of this journey, the prototype also accomplished its first masting away from Friedrichshafen upon landing at Stuttgart Airport. The test program included noise level measurements, avionics tests, and take-offs and landings. In October 1999, the prototype completed a 680 km (420 mi) journey, its longest distance flight at that point. According to the manufacturer, the Zeppelin N07 prototype had proven the technical design by mid 1998, and thus could be applied to production models without major modifications.

On 2 July 2000, the centennial of the first Zeppelin flight, the prototype was christened D-LZFN Friedrichshafen by Count Zeppelin's granddaughter, Elisabeth Veil. In July 2000, the prototype performed a high-profile tour of Germany, travelled more than 3,600 km (2,200 mi) in about 75 flight hours and appearing at the Expo 2000 at Hannover. By December 2000, the flight test programme was completed; during which, the prototype had accumulated in excess of 800 flight hours over roughly 220 flights. In June 2001, the prototype appeared at the Paris Air Show, the occasion being the first time that a Zeppelin had cruised above Paris since the 1920s.

In May 1999, the production of the components for the first production airship was started. In February 2000, the support structure assembly of the first series airship was completed, while the envelope was attached to the support structure in May that year. In 2001, the company formally commenced series manufacturing of the Zeppelin NT, and began the commercial exploitation of the airships. In April 2001, the Luftfahrt-Bundesamt issued type certification for the Zeppelin N07, a key step towards commercial operations; that same month, ZLT became a certified airship-manufacturing company. On 19 May 2001, the first production airship conducted its maiden flight, flying for two and a half hours. On 10 August 2001, the first production airship SN 02 was christened D-LZZR Bodensee by Carl, Duke of Württemberg; five days later, it began providing commercial passenger services, initially involving one-hour sightseeing flights over Lake Constance to members of the public up to ten times per day.

== Design ==
=== Overview ===
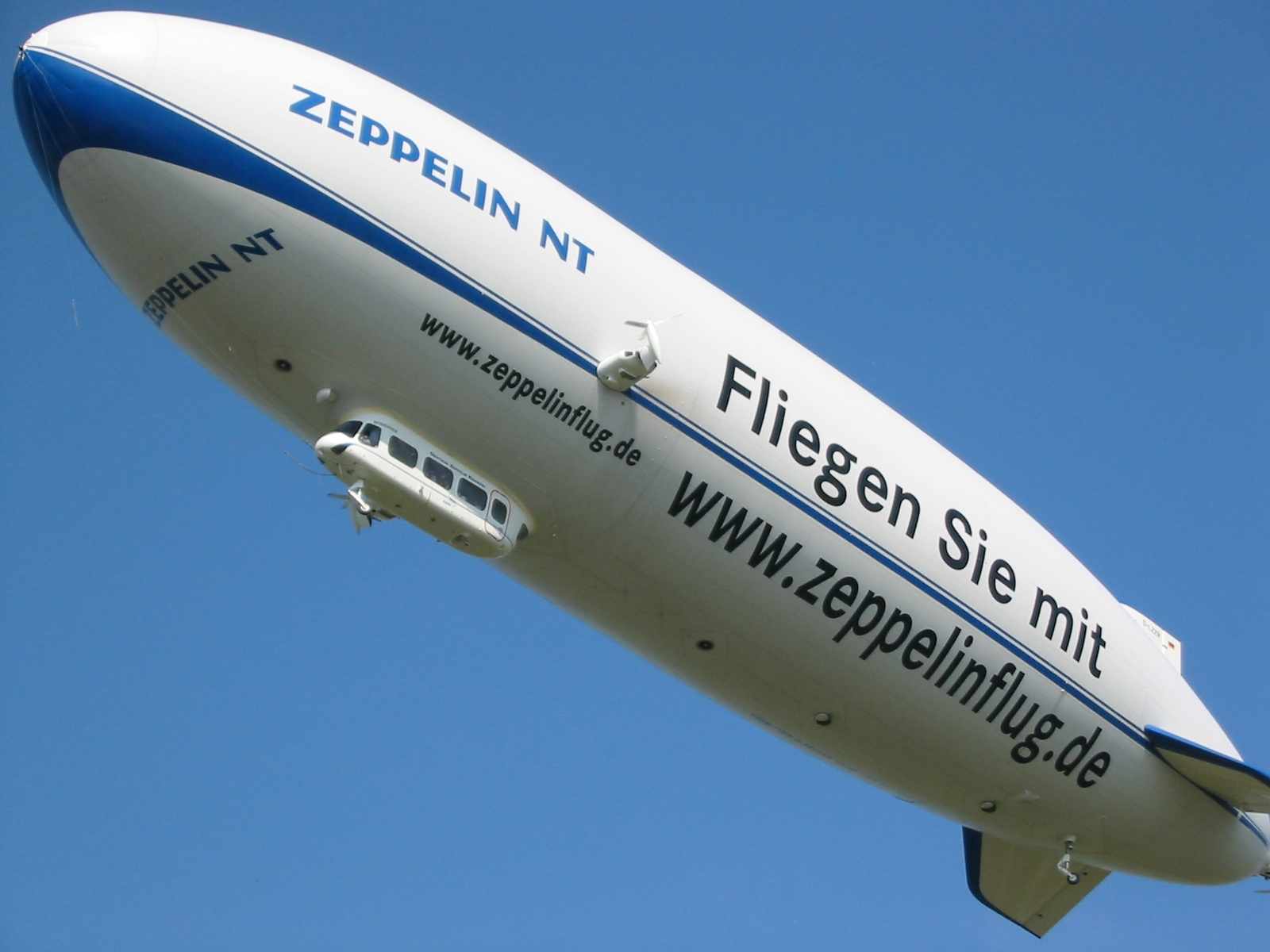
Zeppelin NT D-LZZR at the airport in Friedrichshafen, 2003

The Zeppelin NT series are a family of semi-rigid airships, combining the design principles of rigid airships and blimps together. The Zeppelin N07, the base model and most commonly constructed to date, are 75 metres (246 ft) long, with a volume of 8,225 cubic metres (290,500 cu ft). They are thus considerably smaller than the old Zeppelins, which reached a maximum volume of 200,000 m^{3} (7,100,000 cu ft), such as the LZ 129 Hindenburg. Furthermore, they are inflated exclusively with the non-flammable noble gas helium, rather than with hydrogen.

The Zeppelin NT, designed more than 60 years after the last generation of Zeppelins were built and making use of advances in material science and computer-aided design, is claimed to overcome some of the typical maneuverability, safety, and economic disadvantages of airships. In particular, the propulsion system offers significantly increased safety. In standard operations with a maximum payload, the lifting gas cells do not create enough buoyancy to make the whole ship lighter than air. The negative buoyancy is overcome with the application of engine power. The buoyancy can change when traveling with a reduced payload and partially emptied fuel tanks, but typically the Zeppelin NT starts a journey with a net downward force of about 3,000 newtons (670 lbf); on long trips, the airship can become lighter–than–air if much of its fuel is consumed.

The design typically has a range of some 900 kilometres (560 mi) and reaches top speeds of 125 kilometres per hour (78 mph). The standard cruising speed of 70 km/h (43 mph) for tourist flights can be attained using the rear propeller only. Standard operational altitude is 300 m (980 ft), but up to 2,600 m (8,500 ft) is possible. Their maximum permitted takeoff weight is 10,960 kilograms (24,160 lb), with a payload of 1,900 kg (4,200 lb). A long endurance system can also be installed for extended range and longer flight times.

=== Hull and structure ===
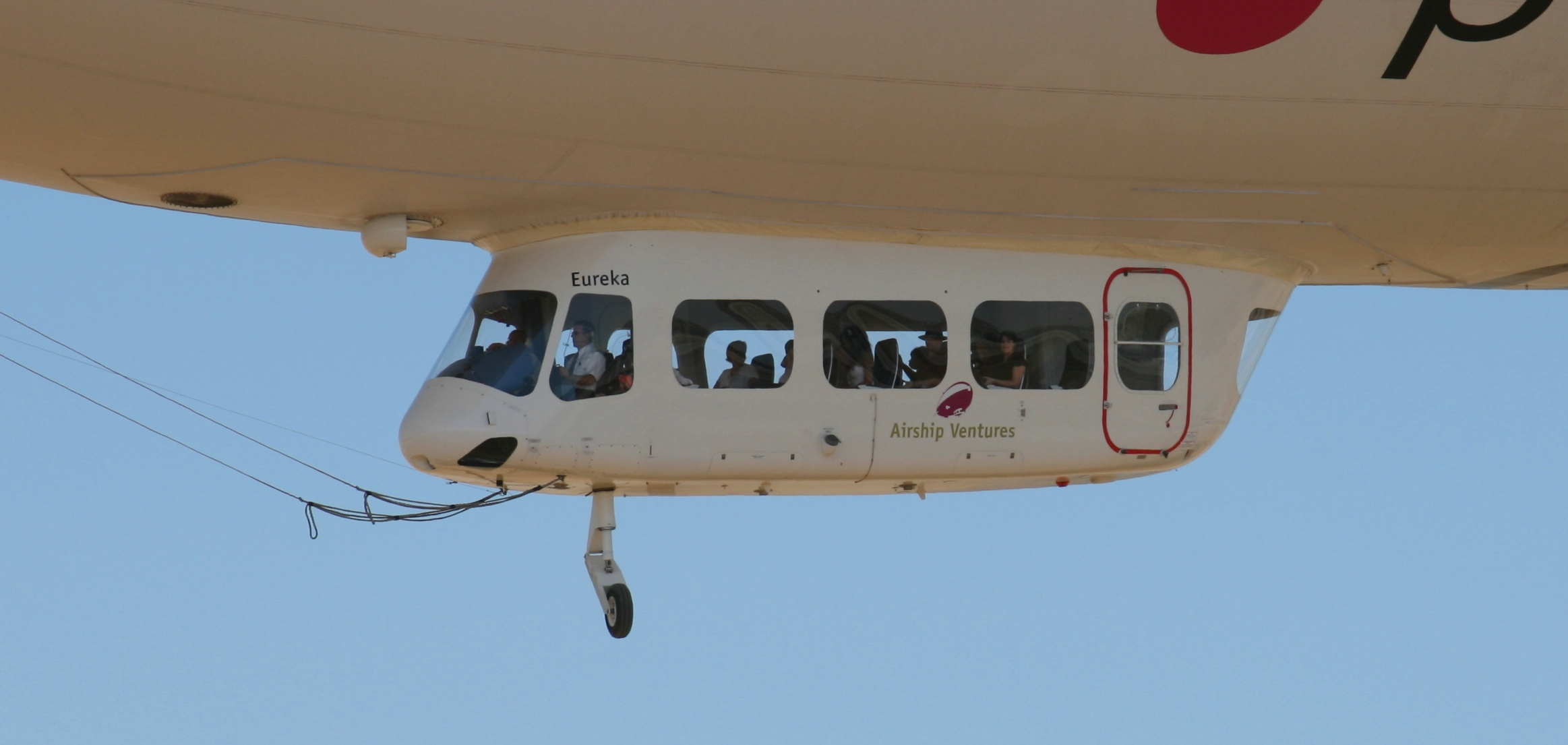
The gondola of a Zeppelin NT

The Zeppelin NT is a semi-rigid airship. It is unlike both the original Zeppelins that had a rigid skeleton and non-rigid blimps. It has an internal triangular truss made of graphite-reinforced plastic and three longitudinal girders made of welded aluminium which connect the triangular elements along the length of the frame. Additionally, the structure is tightened with aramid cords to provide for extra rigidity. All major components, such as the engines, control cabin and the steering fins, are mounted upon the structure; this allows maneuverability to be maintained even in the event of envelope pressure being lost. The whole structure weighs only about 1,000 kilograms (2,200 lb).

The envelope contains the lighter-than-air helium which gives the airship its buoyancy. Inside historical Zeppelins, the gas cells were separate entities from the hull; however, on the Zeppelin NT, the envelope serves both as the aircraft's hull and as the gas cell. It is made of a three-layered laminate: one gas-tight layer of Tedlar (PVF), one polyester fabric layer to provide stability and one polyurethane layer suitable for plastic welding that acts to connect the separate laminate panels. To preserve its outer form, a slight overpressure of about 5 millibars (0.073 psi) is maintained within the hull. As in blimps, the interior pressure is kept constant at all flight altitudes by using ballonets. The ballonets have a total volume of 2,000 cubic metres (71,000 cu ft).

On the external surfaces of the Zeppelin NT are several equipment attachment points, including multiple hardpoints present for the purpose of installing cameras of up to 65 kg weight; an optional nose-mounted boom can be installed for attaching sensor equipment or scientific probes. Payloads can also be suspended underneath the airship via a cargo hook arrangement using the floor hatch present in the cabin. Due to the center of gravity and the location of the cabin being different, two sets of non-retractable landing gear are installed on the underside of the airship, the forward set being directly attached to the cabin's underside and the aft set upon the primary structure itself.

=== Propulsion and steering ===
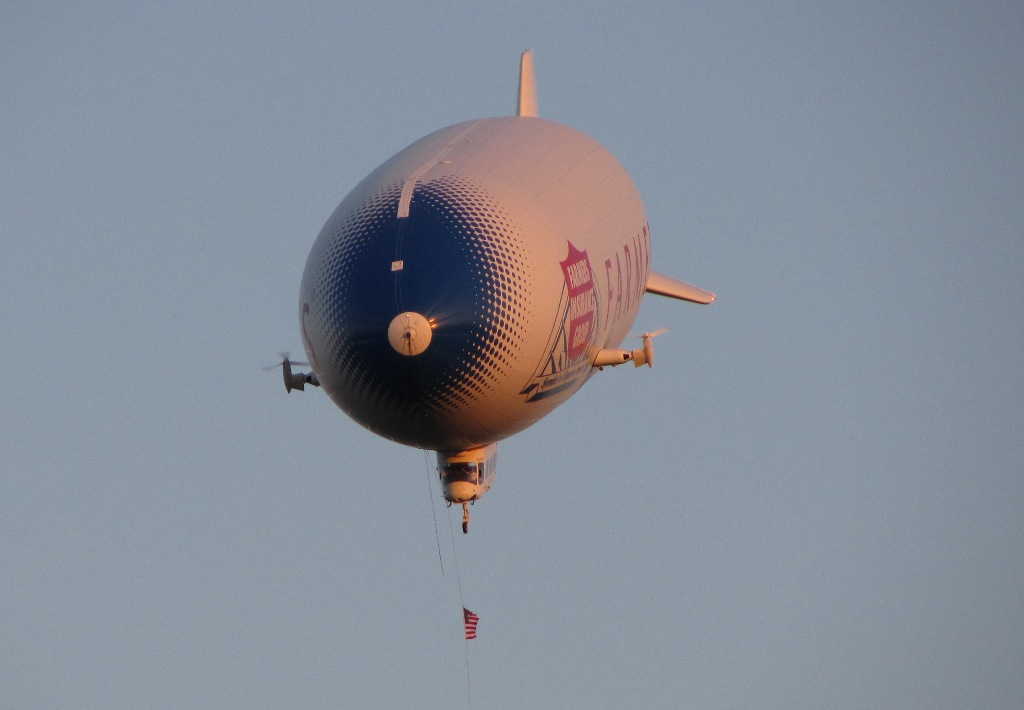
Side thrusters visible on approach

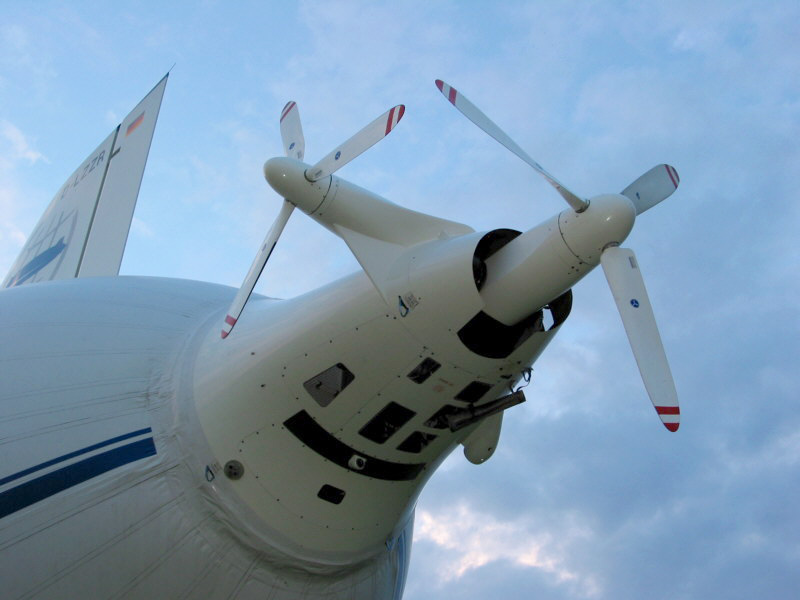
The rear propeller arrangement of a Zeppelin NT, showing a fixed steering propeller (left) and a tiltable thrust propeller (right)

Power for the Zeppelin NT's propulsion systems is provided by a trio of 147-kilowatt (197 hp) Textron Lycoming IO-360 boxer aviation engines, fueled by standard aviation gasoline. These engines are mounted on the sides and rear of the structure itself to provide optimum efficiency; this arrangement also increases in-flight comfort due to reduced levels of propeller noise and vibration. In addition to thrust, each engine also provides maneuverability via their swiveling propellers; the two forward engines are equipped with hydraulically-actuated tilting propellers which are usually aligned horizontally, but can be turned 90° upward or 30° downward; while the aft engine powers a tilting propeller capable of rearward and downward thrust, and a fixed lateral propeller for steering. Each engine is furnished with separate fuel tanks and supply systems that typically operate independently of one another.

The swiveling propellers have been claimed to have provided the Zeppelin NT with unusual flight characteristics, such as being able to hover precisely, fly backwards, take off vertically, and turn on its axis. The functionality of the swiveling propellers allows the Zeppelin NT to carry out both take-offs and landing operations entirely in the vertical plane. During such operations, only three ground personnel are required, lowering costs and minimizing turnaround times as a consequence. In 2010, development of an improved propeller capable of quieter operation was completed.

Instead of four rudder and elevator fins set on the airship's empennage, the Zeppelin NT uses only three identical fins; one fin being set at the top with the others offset at an angle of 120 degrees to either side of the top fin. This arrangement not only saves weight, but as a side effect, the loss of one fin can be compensated with the remaining two. The aerodynamically balanced rudders are equipped with independent electrical actuators.

=== Cockpit and cabin ===
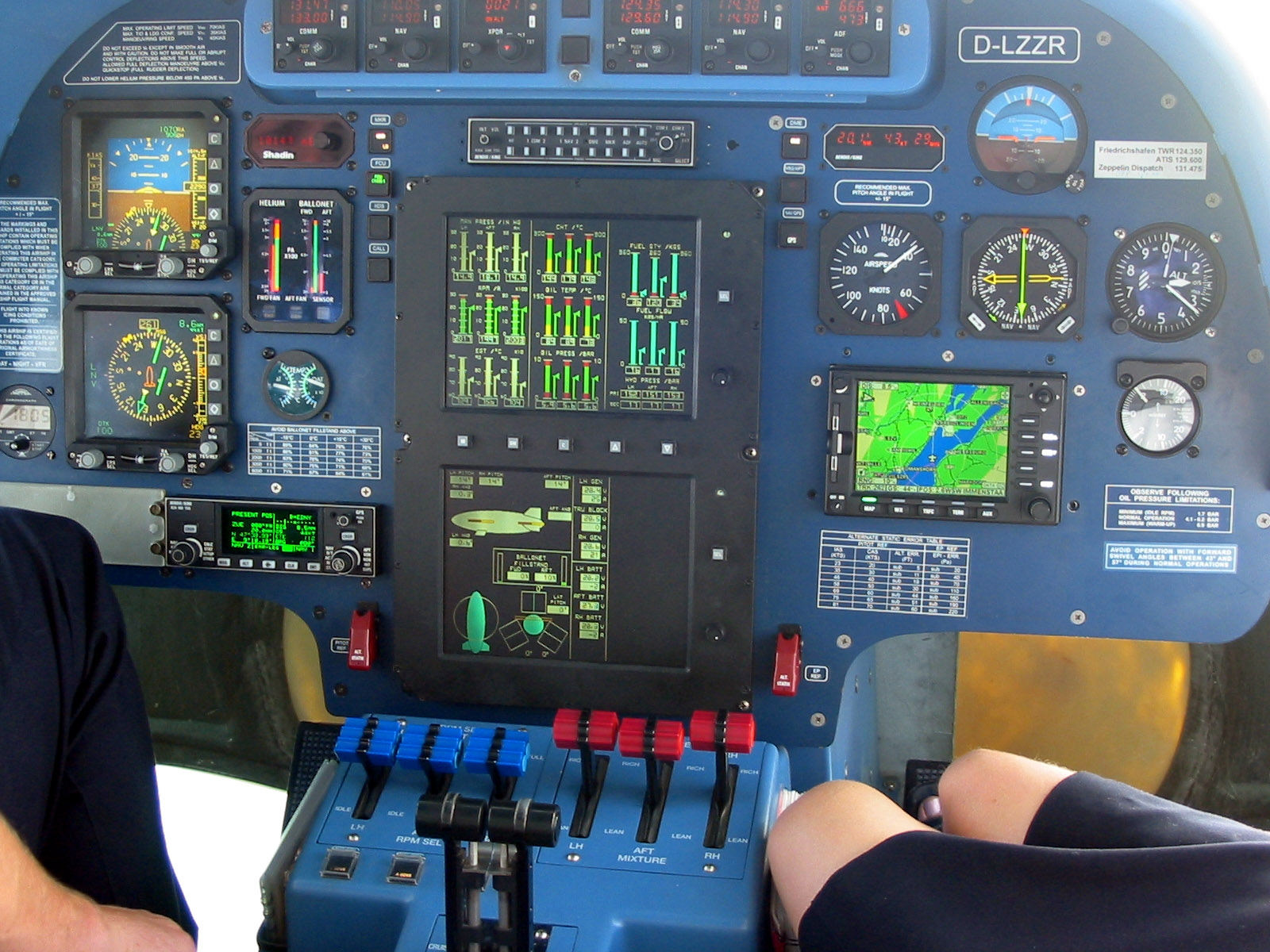
Instrument Panel of Zeppelin NT D–LZZR (2003)

The two-man cockpit of the Zeppelin NT is equipped with modern avionics systems and provides similar levels of external visibility to that of a helicopter. The flight controls make use of fly-by-wire technology to reduce physical demands upon the pilot as well as enable the execution of precision maneuvers; the pilot uses a single joystick to steer the airship across the three dimensions. The Zeppelin NT is certified for single pilot operations; the second seat is often used by a flight attendant during tourist operations. Elements of the airship's avionics, including navigation, communication, and air data systems, can be directly interfaced with the mission support systems; an 8kVA additional electrical power system is also present. In early 2012, ZLT and Goodyear signed an agreement to replace the Zeppelin NT's instrumentation and display systems, upgrading the cockpit to feature a glass cockpit.

The base model of the Zeppelin NT has a passenger capacity of 12 in addition to a crew of two; alternatively, it is capable of lifting payloads of up to 1,900 kg (4,200 lb). In contrast, the original Zeppelin designs carried over a hundred passengers and crew, with a nearly even ratio of passengers to crew members. The Zeppelin NT has been equipped with a variable cabin structure, allowing it to be quickly changed for various purposes and missions. Entrance and egress of the cabin for both cargo and passengers is provided by a pair of large hinged floor-level doors. In a passenger configuration, up to 13 seats equipped with seatbelts may be installed along with heating/air conditioning systems, a kitchenette, and a restroom in the rear cabin area; large wraparound windows are also present to provide panoramic views of the outside. Amongst the possible seating configurations, more luxurious VIP layouts are also available. Alternatively, mission equipment can be installed in the cabin area.

== Operational history ==
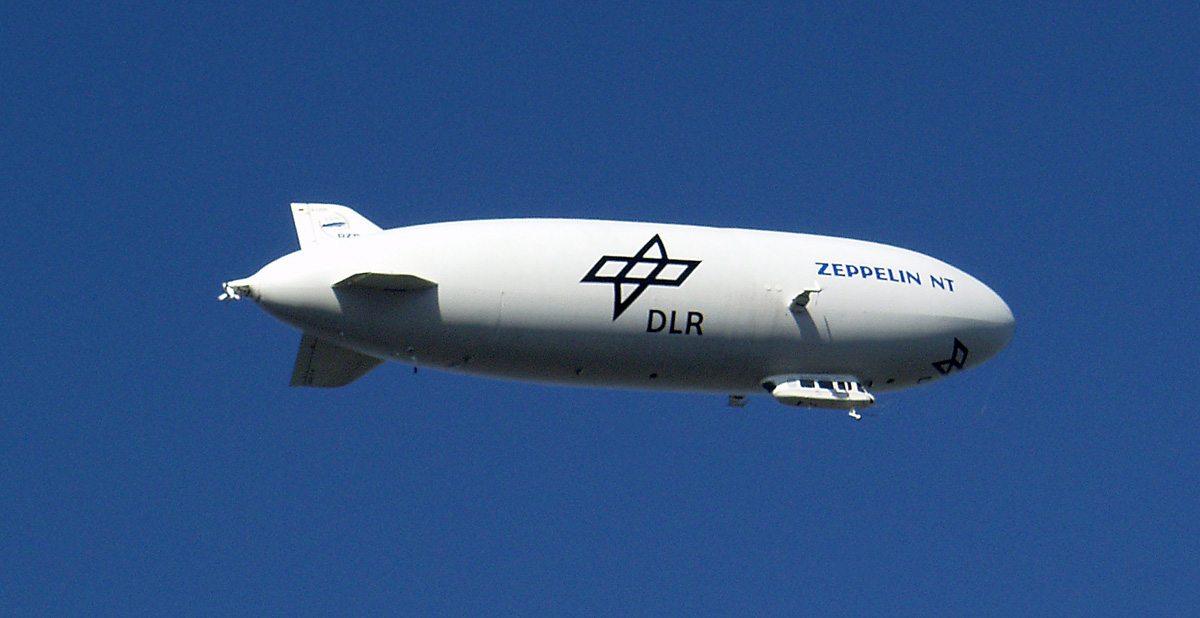
The DLR Zeppelin NT was used to study traffic patterns.

Seven Zeppelin NTs have been built to date.

=== D-LZFN, Friedrichshafen ===
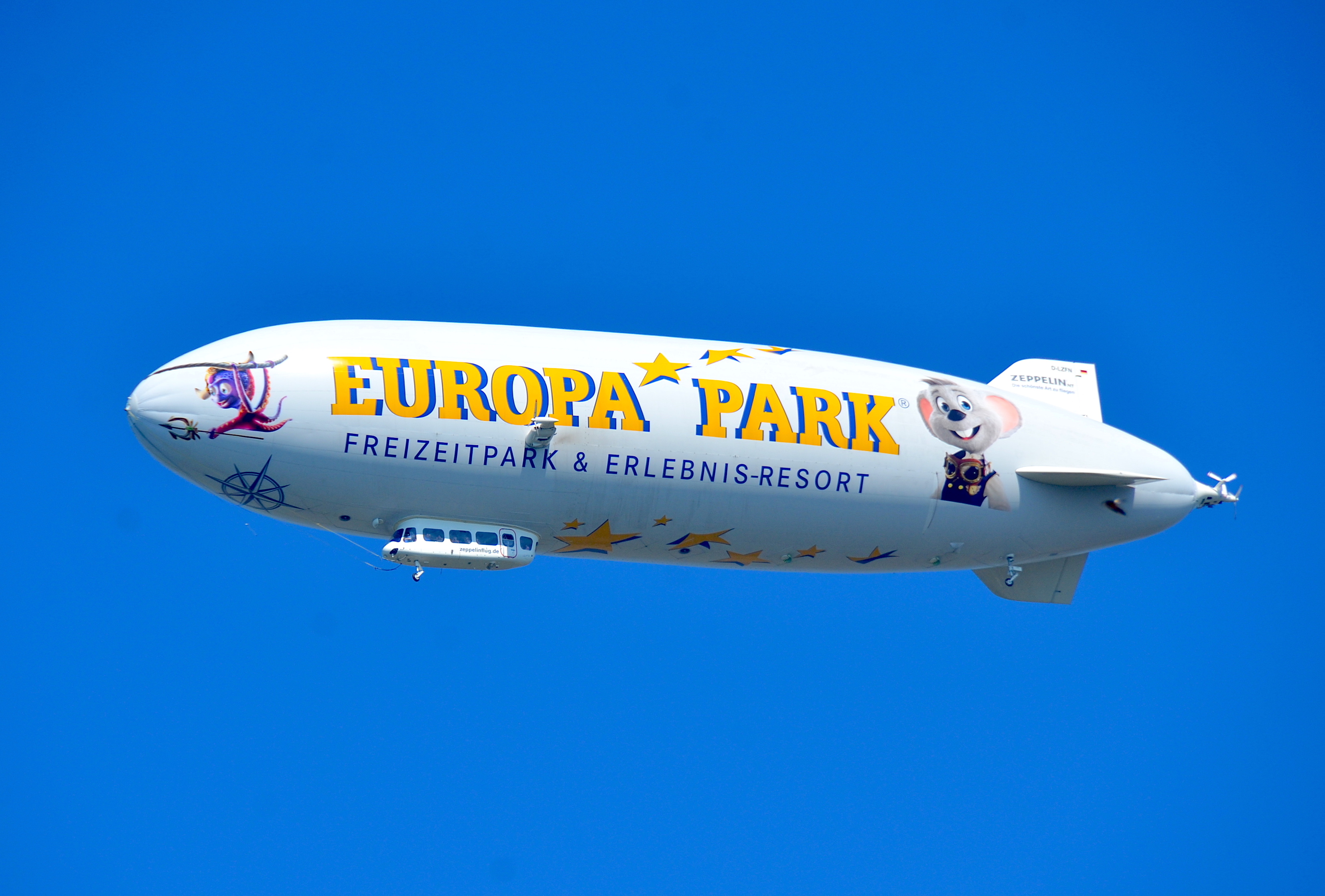
Zeppelin NT (D-LZFN) of Friedrichshafen

The prototype Zeppelin NT (SN 01), D-LZFN, Friedrichshafen, was intended to be used for training pilots for special flights and for presentations. During the Oktoberfest of 2002 a Zeppelin NT was used for radio experiments in connection with the European Galileo positioning system project for the German Aerospace Center and the ESA. It was intended that all further ships would be used commercially or sold. As a tribute to the days of Zeppelin mail, a number of mail-carrying flights were planned. Steve Fossett and Paul Stroehle set the current speed record for airships over a distance of one kilometer on Wednesday, October 27, 2004 in Friedrichshafen, Germany with a Zeppelin NT. The new world record was set to 111.8 kilometres per hour (69.5 mph), an improvement of 19 km/h (12 mph).

Starting in late 2005 the Friedrichshafen was based in Jwaneng, a diamond mining town in southern Botswana, where it conducted an airborne geophysical survey on behalf of De Beers Prospecting Botswana. The airship was moved from Amsterdam to Cape Town by ship and then flown to Gaborone where a Lockheed Martin full tensor gravity gradiometer was installed. This instrument, owned and operated by Bell Geospace, measures changes in the Earth's gravity field associated with geological density variations. The technology is based on accelerometers and the data quality is sensitive to the turbulence and motion usually associated with fixed wing aircraft installations. The airship, flying slowly at night in relatively cool calm air, provides a very stable and vibrationally quiet platform. The resulting data is capable of revealing the rather faint gravity signals associated with Kimberlite pipes – a source of diamonds – buried under the Kalahari sands. This survey came to an end on 20 September 2007, when D-LZFN was irreparably damaged by a whirlwind while moored at its mast.

Registration number D-LZFN, was later given to SN 02 when it returned from Japan.

=== D-LZZR, Bodensee ===
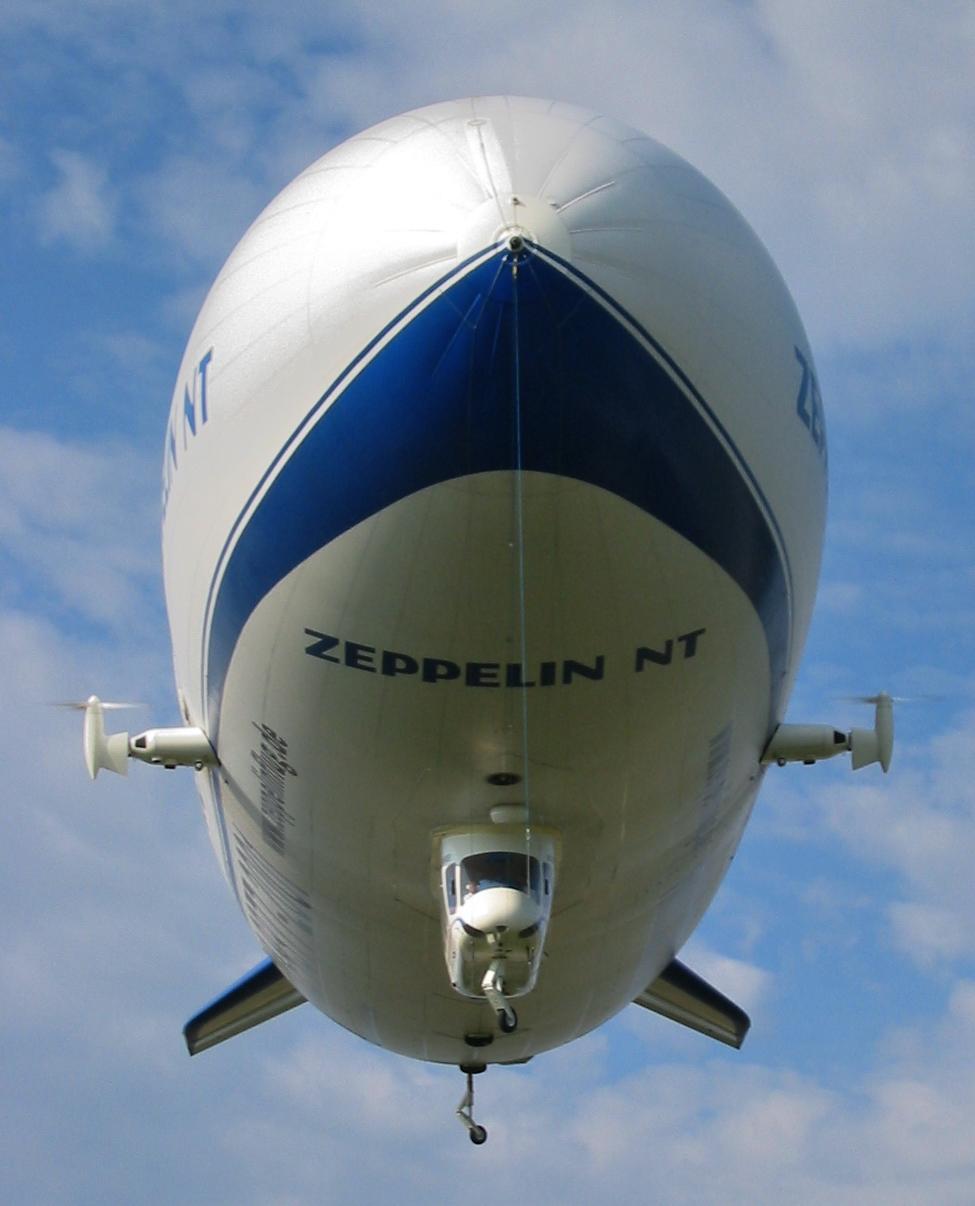
Airship D-LZZR during low level flight, 2003

The second Zeppelin NT and first production model (SN 02) was named D-LZZR Bodensee and began the first commercial tourist operations on August 15, 2001 by Deutsche Zeppelin Reederei (DZR). On March 2, 2004 the DZR sold it to Nippon Airship Corporation in Japan. Transferred in June 2004, it was to have followed the historical route of the 1929 World Tour of the famous dirigible LZ127 Graf Zeppelin. After problems with Russian authorities (unattested air security), a special ship for huge parts from the Netherlands was chartered and the Zeppelin was shipped from Italy to Japan by sea. The company used the airship mainly for tours and advertising. In May 2010, due to economic problems at Nippon Airship Corporation, the SN 02 was shipped back to Germany. The craft regained her old name Bodensee and resumed passenger operations in 2012. In winter 2015–16, Bodensee was rebuilt to -101 configuration, with its passenger capacity increased to 14.

=== D-LZZF, Baden-Württemberg ===
The third Zeppelin NT (SN03) and second production model, designated D-LZZF, Baden-Württemberg, first flew in February 2003. It is currently flown in revenue passenger service by the DZR. It was painted in Goodyear colors for the summer season 2010 to promote a new joint venture between Goodyear and the Zeppelin Luftschiffbau, the first in 70 years.

=== D-LZNT, Eureka ===
In January 2006, the Zeppelin Luftschifftechnik GmbH announced the start of construction of a fourth Zeppelin N07. In 2007, it was optioned by California-based Airship Ventures. On 21 May 2008, the new airship completed its first flight. Between July and September 2008, the airship, registered D-LZNT, operated sightseeing and pleasure flights over eastern London and the Thames Estuary from an airfield close to Upminster, in Essex, England, advertising Stella Artois beer and the DrinkAware responsible alcohol use campaign. The Federal Aviation Administration (FAA) issued the type certificate for the Zeppelin N07, allowing the airship to fly legally in the United States. In late September 2008, the airship arrived at the Port of Beaumont, Texas; after spending three days tethered at the Southeast Texas Regional Airport, the airship flew cross-country to its base at Moffett Federal Airfield. Upon its arrival, the airship was given the US registration N704LZ, and was christened Eureka (after the California state motto). In November 2008, Airship Ventures began commercial operations, offering flightseeing tours over the San Francisco and Monterey Bay areas, operating both out of Moffett Field and Oakland Terminal. On 14 November 2012, Airship Ventures ceased operations and grounded Eureka. Eureka was disassembled and shipped back to Germany. In 2019-2020, D-LZNT was rebuilt to N07-101 -standard and brought back to service, with a completely new gondola for 16 passengers and crew.

=== Goodyear ===
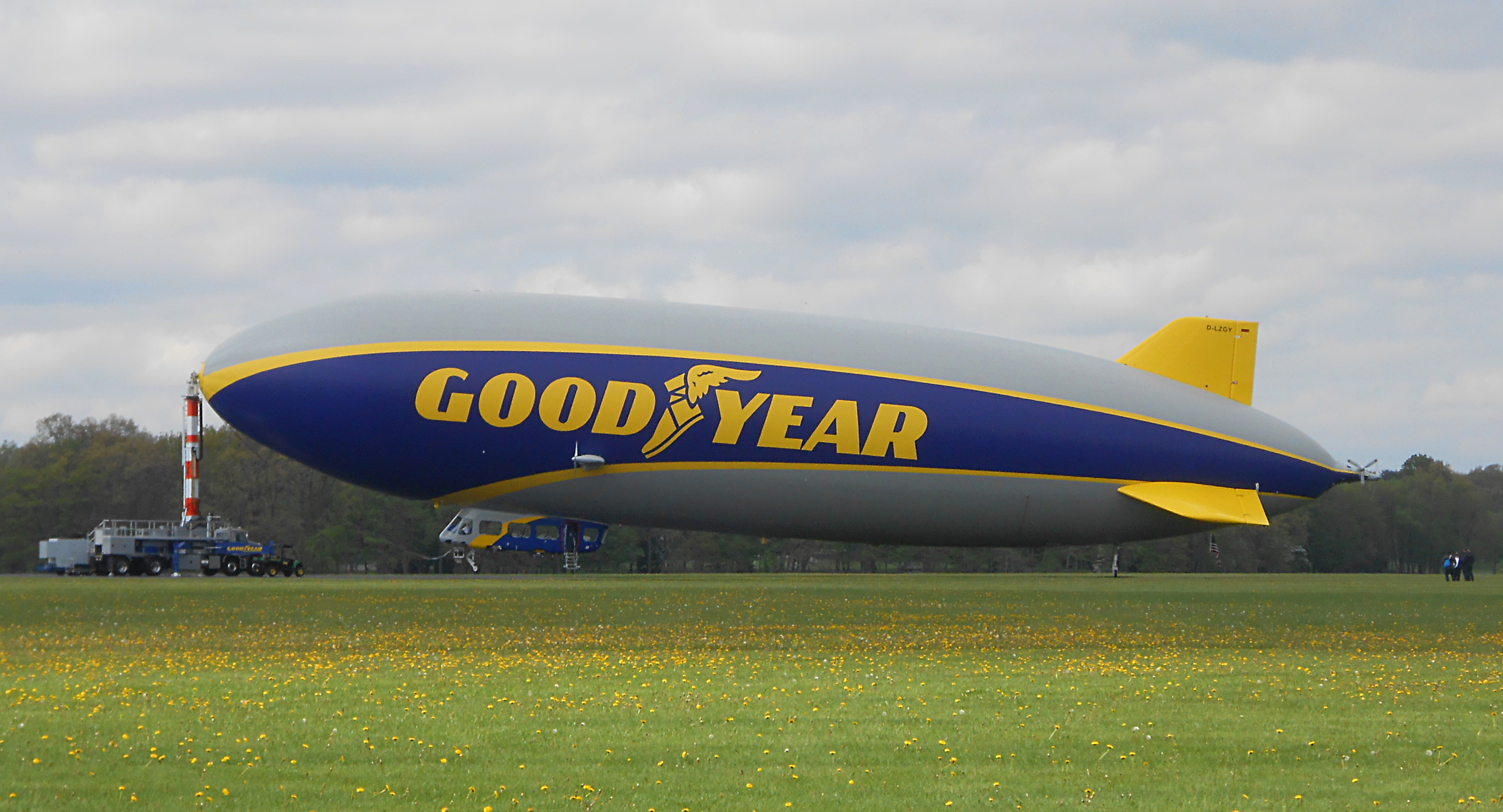
Goodyear's Wingfoot One, a model LZ N07-101, shown here prior to its christening

On 3 May 2011, Goodyear confirmed their intentions to reinstate their long-lost partnership with Zeppelin. Goodyear placed an order for three Zeppelin NT LZ N07-101 models with plans to start operation in January 2014. The Zeppelin NT is the successor to Goodyear's non-rigid airship, the GZ-20 in Goodyear airship advertising. Goodyear's first zeppelin, Wingfoot One, was unveiled on 14 March 2014 and is currently stationed in Pompano Beach, Florida, USA. The second zeppelin, Wingfoot Two made its maiden flight on 12 March 2016. Wingfoot Two is stationed in Carson, California. The third zeppelin, Wingfoot Three made its maiden flight on 25 June 2018 and will be permanently stationed in Suffield Township, Ohio.

=== Deutsche Zeppelin-Reederei ===
In January 2001, ZLG founded the Deutsche Zeppelin-Reederei (DZR) (German for German Zeppelin shipping company) as a subsidiary. Since 15 August 2001, DZR has offered aerial sightseeing tours using a number of Zeppelin NT airships; in June 2010, the 100,000th passenger was carried, less than nine years after commercial operations were launched. In March 2004, DZR became the first company in the world to receive certification as a flight school for airships, initially providing such services to the Japanese Nippon Airship Corporation.

== Variants ==
LZ N07-100
Original production version.
LZ N07-101
Slightly improved version produced since 2011. New avionics and slightly longer gondola increasing max passenger capacity to 14. Goodyear ships are seated for ten passengers, with addition of on-board toilet.
Zeppelin NT 14
Planned larger, 19-seat aircraft. The "14" comes from the 14,000 cubic metres (14 megalitres) of envelope volume.

== Specifications ==
Data from Jane's All The World's Aircraft 2003–2004, Airship Technology

General characteristics

- Crew: 2
- Capacity: 12 passengers or 1,900 kg (4,200 lb) payload
- Length: 75.00 m (246 ft 0.75 in)
- Diameter: 14.16 m (46 ft 5.5 in)
- Width: 19.50 m (63 ft 11.75 in)
- Height: 17.40 m (57 ft 1 in)
- Volume: 8,255 m^{3} (290,450 cu ft)
- Gross weight: 10,690 kg (23,567 lb)
- Powerplant: 3 × Textron Lycoming IO-360 air-cooled flat-four, 149 kW (200 hp) each

Performance

- Maximum speed: 125 km/h (77 mph, 67 kn)
- Cruise speed: 115 km/h (71 mph, 62 kn)
- Range: 900 km (559 mi, 486 nmi)
- Endurance: 24 hours
- Service ceiling: 2,600 m (8,530 ft)

== See also ==
- Buoyancy compensator (aviation)
- Goodyear Blimp
- Hybrid Air Vehicles Airlander 10
