= Switchboard =

The term switchboard, when used by itself, may refer to:

- Telephone switchboard
- Electrical controls:
  - Electric switchboard in industrial applications like electricity generation
  - Distribution board in residential and commercial applications
- Printed circuit board
- Mixing console
- Switchboard, another term for a helpline.
- Switchboard of Miami, a nonprofit organization offering hotline, informational and referral services in Miami, Florida
- Switchboard (UK), formerly known as the London Lesbian and Gay Switchboard, a helpline for the LGBT+ persons in the UK
