= Board International =

Business intelligence software company

Board International S.A.
- Type: Private
- Industry: Enterprise Performance Management Software
- Founded: 1994; 32 years ago
- Headquarters: Chiasso, Switzerland; Boston, Massachusetts, U.S.
- Products: The Agentic Planning Platform
- Website: www.board.com

Board International S.A. is a global software vendor known for its Board Agentic Planning Platform (formerly known as the Board Enterprise Planning Platform) which unifies finance and operational planning. The company is based in Chiasso, Switzerland, where it was founded in 1994, and Boston, Massachusetts.

Board International operates worldwide and serves around 2,000 customers across a variety of industries.

== Product ==
The company’s software combines business intelligence, enterprise performance management, predictive analytics, and AI capabilities in one platform that is typically used for business activities such as FP&A, reporting, planning, and forecasting. Board's BI/analytics capabilities include multi-dimensional analysis, ad hoc querying, dashboarding and reporting, while its enterprise performance management (EPM) capabilities include budgeting, planning and forecasting as well as "other finance-related activities." It does not require any programming skills to build applications.

== History ==
- 1994: Founded in Chiasso, Switzerland
- 2016: Minority investment by Grafton Capital
- 2019: Majority acquisition by Nordic Capital
- 2024: Acquisition of Prevedere
