= Prudy Taylor Board =

American author

Prudy Taylor Board (born 21 December 1933), who also writes under the name Prue Foster, is an American author and editor. She was born in Florida.

Board has written more than 1,000 magazine and newspaper articles, and has also written several novels and nonfiction books.
