= Bulletin board (disambiguation) =

A bulletin board is a surface intended for the posting of public messages.

Bulletin board may also refer to:

- Bulletin board system, a computer server running software that allows users to connect to the system using a terminal program
  - List of bulletin board systems
- Bulletin Board (album), an album by The Partridge Family

== See also ==
- Bulletin (disambiguation)
- Billboard (US English slang)
- Internet forum also known as message board, online discussion platform or bulletin board
- BBCode or Bulletin Board Code
- phpBB or PHP Bulletin Board
