= Blackboard (disambiguation) =

A blackboard is a reusable writing surface.

Blackboard may also refer to:

- Black board (Soviet policy), sign used in the Soviet era publicly to chastise farms or factories for such things as failing to meet targets or opposing collectivisation
- Blackboard bold, a style of typeface often used for certain symbols in mathematics and physics texts
- Blackboard Inc., an e-learning software company
  - Blackboard Learn, a course management system by Blackboard Inc.
- Blackboard system, an artificial intelligence approach to problem-solving, either a specific architecture or an application
- Blackboard (design pattern), in software engineering
- Blackboards (2000), an Iranian film

== See also ==
- Blackbaud, a software company supplying nonprofit organizations
