= Richard Umbers (footballer) =

Australian rules footballer (born 1968)

Personal information
- Full name: Richard Umbers
- Born: 16 May 1968 (age 58)
- Original team: South Warrnambool
- Draft: 11th, 1990 Pre-Season draft
- Height: 190 cm (6 ft 3 in)
- Weight: 85 kg (187 lb)

Playing career^{1}
Years	Club	Games (Goals)
1990	Brisbane Bears	4 (0)
- ^{1} Playing statistics correct to the end of 1990.

Richard Umbers (born 16 May 1968) is a former Australian rules footballer who played with the Brisbane Bears in the Australian Football League (AFL).

Originally from Hampden Football League club South Warrnambool, Umbers played in the reserves for Geelong Football Club without playing a senior game and moved to Brisbane after being drafted by the Bears in the 1990 pre-season draft.

Brisbane were wooden spoon winners in his only AFL season, losing all four games that he played in. Umbers didn't kick a league goal but had three behinds in a match against Carlton.
