= Max Evans (Australian footballer) =

Australian rules footballer

Personal information
- Full name: Max Evans
- Born: 16 May 1923
- Died: 25 September 2006 (aged 83)
- Original team: Richmond United
- Height: 173 cm (5 ft 8 in)
- Weight: 75 kg (165 lb)

Playing career^{1}
Years	Club	Games (Goals)
1947–1948	Richmond	7 (4)
- ^{1} Playing statistics correct to the end of 1948.

Max Evans (16 May 1923 – 25 September 2006) was an Australian rules footballer who played with Richmond in the Victorian Football League (VFL).

Evans played beside his elder brother Ron at Richmond in 1947 and 1948, after coming to the club from Richmond United.

He left Richmond for South Warrnambool in 1949 and won the Maskell Medal in his first year.
