= Airship Ventures =

US airline

- Commenced operations: November 21, 2008; 17 years ago
- Ceased operations: November 14, 2012; 13 years ago
- Operating bases: Moffett Federal Airfield
- Fleet size: One Zeppelin NT
- Headquarters: Mountain View, California, United States
- Key people: Alexandra Hall (Owner); Brian Hall (Owner)

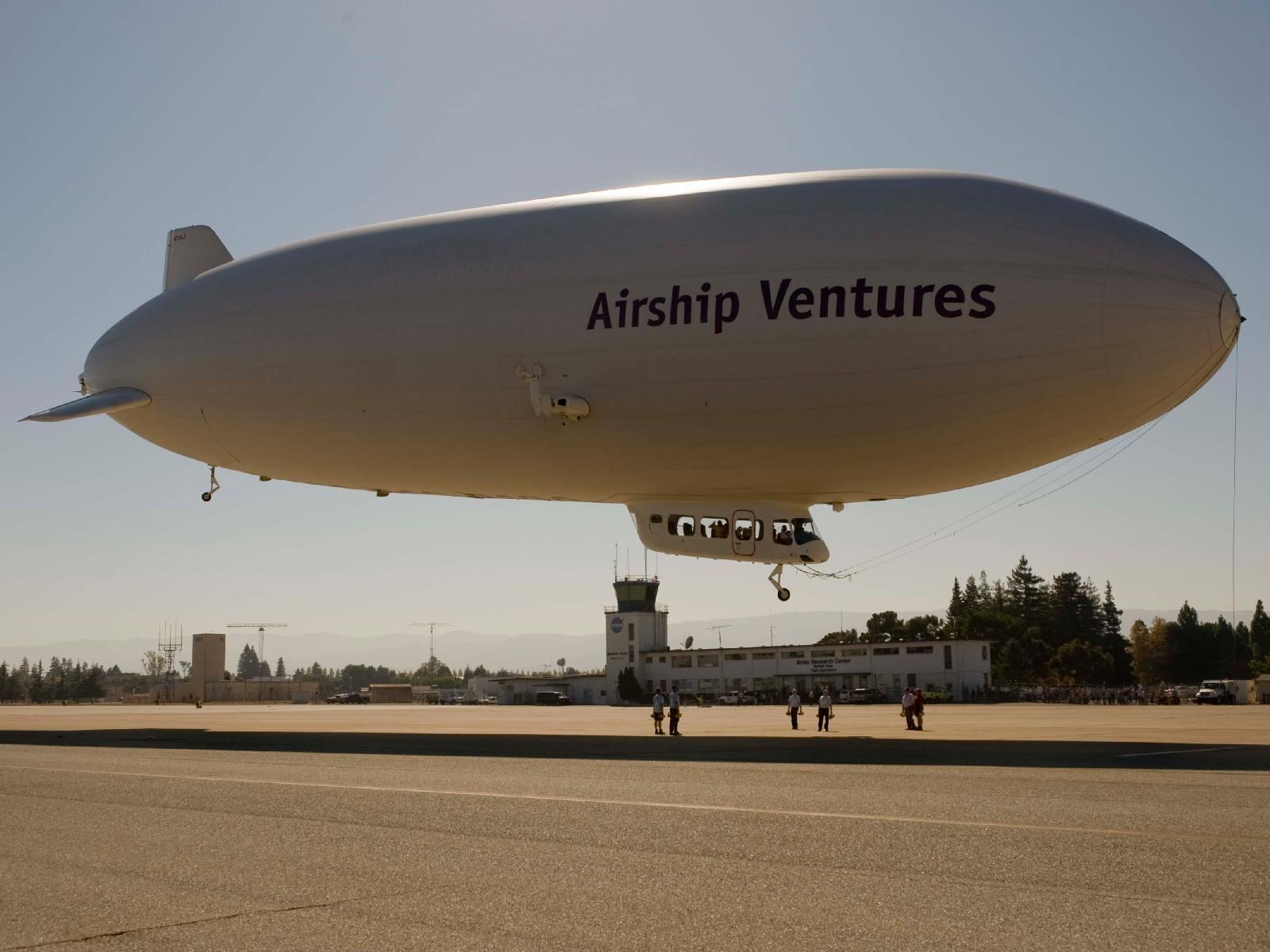
Airship Ventures' Zeppelin NT named Eureka arrives at Moffett Federal Airfield on October 25, 2008

Airship Ventures Inc. was a private company that offered sight-seeing rides (which the company called "flightseeing") in a 12-passenger Zeppelin NT out of a World War II United States Navy hangar at Moffett Federal Airfield near Mountain View, California.

As of December 2012, their airship, built by Zeppelin Luftschifftechnik GmbH, is in a state of disassembly, but is still one of three zeppelins in the world. The ship was dedicated and christened Eureka at the 75th anniversary celebration for Moffett Field on November 21, 2008; its flight from Beaumont, Texas, where it was shipped, to the Bay Area was the first zeppelin flight in the United States in 71 years.

At 246 feet (75 m) long, it was the largest airship in the world until the U.S. Army's LEMV had its maiden flight in 2012.

The company was owned by the husband and wife team of Alexandra and Brian Hall of Los Gatos, California. Alexandra Hall previously ran the Chabot Space and Science Center in Oakland, California, and Brian Hall is the CEO of telecommunications software company Mark/Space. Two of their pilots, Katherine "Kate" Board (who left the company to fly another Zeppelin NT in Germany) and Andrea Deyling, are the only female zeppelin pilots in the world.

Airship Ventures was based out of the Bachelor Officer Quarters in Building 20 in the NASA Research Park. The airship was stored in the World War II era Hangar Two, a former blimp hangar.

On November 14, 2012, the company announced that it was closing its doors and grounding flight operations due to a lack of long-term sponsorship. In mid-December the decision was announced to wind up the company and disassemble the Eureka, which was shipped back to Germany.

== See also ==
- Deutsche Zeppelin Reederei (DZR), both the historic and current German Zeppelin passenger transport company
