= Ron Hoy =

Australian rules footballer

Personal information
- Full name: Ronald Augustine Hoy
- Born: 13 August 1932
- Died: 15 July 2016 (aged 83); Warrnambool, Victoria
- Original team: South Warrnambool
- Height: 169 cm (5 ft 7 in)
- Weight: 73 kg (161 lb)

Playing career^{1}
Years	Club	Games (Goals)
1955	Hawthorn	1 (0)
- ^{1} Playing statistics correct to the end of 1955.

Ronald Augustine Hoy (13 August 1932 – 15 July 2016) was an Australian rules footballer who played with Hawthorn in the Victorian Football League (VFL).

Hoy spent most of his career at South Warrnambool, but had a stint with Norwood in 1952. He came down to Melbourne and played one VFL game for Hawthorn in 1955, their round 10 win over St Kilda at Glenferrie Oval.

He was the first player in the history of the Hampden Football League to win three Maskell Medals. He took home the award in 1954, 1955 and 1957.

Hoy died at Warrnambool in 2016.
