= Diving board =

Diving board may refer to:

- Springboard
- Diving platform, referred to as a "tower" or sometimes "firm board"
- The Diving Board, a 2013 album by Elton John
