= Soundboard =

Soundboard, sound board, or sounding board may refer to:

- Soundboard (music), a part of a musical instrument
- Sounding board, an attachment to a pulpit to assist a human speaker
- Mixing console, used to combine electronic audio signals
- Soundboard (computer program), a web application or computer program with buttons that play short, often humorous sound clips
- Soundboard (magazine), a quarterly publication of the Guitar Foundation of America
- Any circuit board used to produce or handle sound
  - Sound card
  - Sound chip
- Sound board, building construction material used for soundproofing
- Soundboard recording, a type of bootleg recording of a concert

*Sounding board, a wooden board in a boat used to measure depth
