= Terry Board (footballer, born 1968) =

Australian rules footballer

Personal information
- Full name: Terry Board
- Born: 14 September 1968 (age 58)
- Original team: Old Paradians
- Height: 178 cm (5 ft 10 in)
- Weight: 75 kg (165 lb)

Playing career^{1}
Years	Club	Games (Goals)
1988, 1990–1991	Fitzroy	15 (1)
- ^{1} Playing statistics correct to the end of 1991.

Terry Board (born 14 September 1968) is a former Australian rules footballer who represented the Fitzroy Football Club in the Australian Football League (AFL) during the late 1980s and early 1990s.

Broad played in eight games with Fitzroy in 1988, before spending the next season out of football. He returned to the club in 1990, adding a further seven games to his career tally, before leaving the club at the end of 1991.
