= The Bulletin (alternative weekly) =

Newspaper in Montgomery County, Texas

- Cover of the June 3-July 10, 2008 issue
- Type: Alternative weekly
- Format: Tabloid
- Owner: Mike Ladyman
- Publisher: Mike Ladyman
- Founded: 1969
- Ceased publication: August 2008
- Language: English
- Headquarters: Montgomery County, Texas, United States
- Circulation: 20,000 (claimed)
- Price: Free
- Website: Thebulletin.com

The Montgomery County Bulletin or simply The Bulletin was a free alternative weekly newspaper distributed in Montgomery County, Texas; a suburban county north of Houston. It claimed a circulation of 20,000 copies before being forced out of business in 2008 due to evidence of massive plagiarism.

== History ==
The paper was founded in 1969 as a shopper. In 1998, Mike Ladyman, former publisher of Wheels magazine (no relation to the Australian publication) bought the paper and turned it into an alternative weekly. He largely ran it as a mom-and-pop business, delivering the paper himself. He largely left the writing to Mark Williams, a freelance writer who was listed as a staff reporter and music editor.

In Ladyman's first year of ownership, the Bulletin received the "Most Improved Newspaper" award from the Texas Community Newspaper Association.

== Plagiarism scandal ==
In late July 2008, Slate music critic Jody Rosen got word that a Williams piece about Jimmy Buffett that appeared in the March 2008 Bulletin was almost a verbatim copy of a 2007 piece Rosen had written for Slate. Rosen did a search on Google and discovered that all of Williams' articles dating back to at least 2005 had been copied wholesale from numerous sources. Williams appeared to have stolen work from diverse publications such as The Guardian, salon.com, NME, Rolling Stone and the Boston Globe. The Buffett article that triggered his initial inquiry, for instance, had been lifted from Rosen's 2007 piece and two other articles. He also found that Williams had stolen at least one of his other articles for Slate.

Later, Rosen obtained a copy of the Bulletin's latest issue, and found that nearly every article in it appeared to have been plagiarized. Rosen suggested that "in purely statistical terms, [...] the articles in the Montgomery County Bulletin [may] amount to the greatest plagiarism scandal in the annals of American journalism".

After Rosen published his article on August 6, 2008; some observers suggested that Mark Williams was simply a pen name of Mike Ladyman, but in a Houston Press interview Ladyman denied the charge and called Slate's piece “an attack, an attention-grabbing hatchet job”. He also complained of Rosen's attitude in the affair and claimed that he was not given sufficient time and details to react appropriately and diligently. “The mistake I made was not working fast enough for Jody Rosen and apparently I needed to be punished for it.” Ladyman announced he was shutting down The Bulletin, and blamed Williams for the plagiarism. Williams himself published a bitter and sarcastic open letter to Rosen in which he wrote, describing himself as the victim of the critic's quest for blogosphere fame: "Of course, you are certainly owed an apology, but one has to ponder for a moment just why that is; after all, you have most definitely garnered the attention of the bloggers that you evidently crave in abundance with this manufactured scandal." Williams claimed that he had not intentionally plagiarized articles but had simply used press kit material without realizing that they included work of other journalists: "I did so thinking it was cleared for such use; but, as [Rosen] so subtly pointed out, I was mistaken." In turn, Rosen contested the timeline presented by Ladyman, and blamed him for shunning his responsibilities as the newspaper's editor.

The scandal also spawned discussion on the thin line which separates plagiarism from very commonplace news aggregation. In the conclusion of his piece, Rosen quipped "Mike Ladyman and company may simply be bringing guerrilla-style 21st-century content aggregation to 20th-century print media: publishing the Napster of newspapers." Craig Silverman of Regret the Error described the Bulletin as "perhaps the first newspaper to pursue plagiarism as a standard operating procedure."

Rosen was a guest on NPR's On the Media on August 8, 2008. He suggested that the Bulletin really didn't need a website because it was a free paper supported by advertising in the print edition. He thought that Williams' plagiarism probably would have gone unnoticed had not the paper's website opened it up to being searched on Google.
