= Jim Board =

Australian rules footballer

Personal information
- Full name: Jeremy Board
- Born: 17 February 1956 (age 70)
- Original team: South Warrnambool
- Height: 180 cm (5 ft 11 in)
- Weight: 76 kg (168 lb)

Playing career^{1}
| Years | Club | Games (Goals) |
| 1976 | Collingwood | 7 (5) |
- ^{1} Playing statistics correct to the end of 1976.

Jim Board (born 17 February 1956) is a former Australian rules footballer who played with Collingwood in the Victorian Football League (VFL).

Jeremy (Jim) Board, was also, (up to the year 2021

), a teacher at the Mount Barker Waldorf School, having taught several rounds of children as their primary teacher up through grades one to seven. His wife is Julie Board, with whom he has children and several grandchildren. Jeremy is a member of both the Mount Barker community and Waldorf/Steiner community broadly.
