= S74 =

S74 may refer to:

- S74 (Long Island bus)
- S74 (New York City bus) serving Staten Island
- Birrana S74, an Australian speedcar
- Expressway S74 (Poland)
- Fiat S74, a racing car
- HMCS Okanagan (S74), a submarine of the Canadian Forces
- Savoia-Marchetti S.74, an Italian airliner
- Sikorsky S-74, an American helicopter design
- Spanish submarine Tramontana (S74)
- S74, a postcode district for Barnsley, England
