= Fiat S61 =

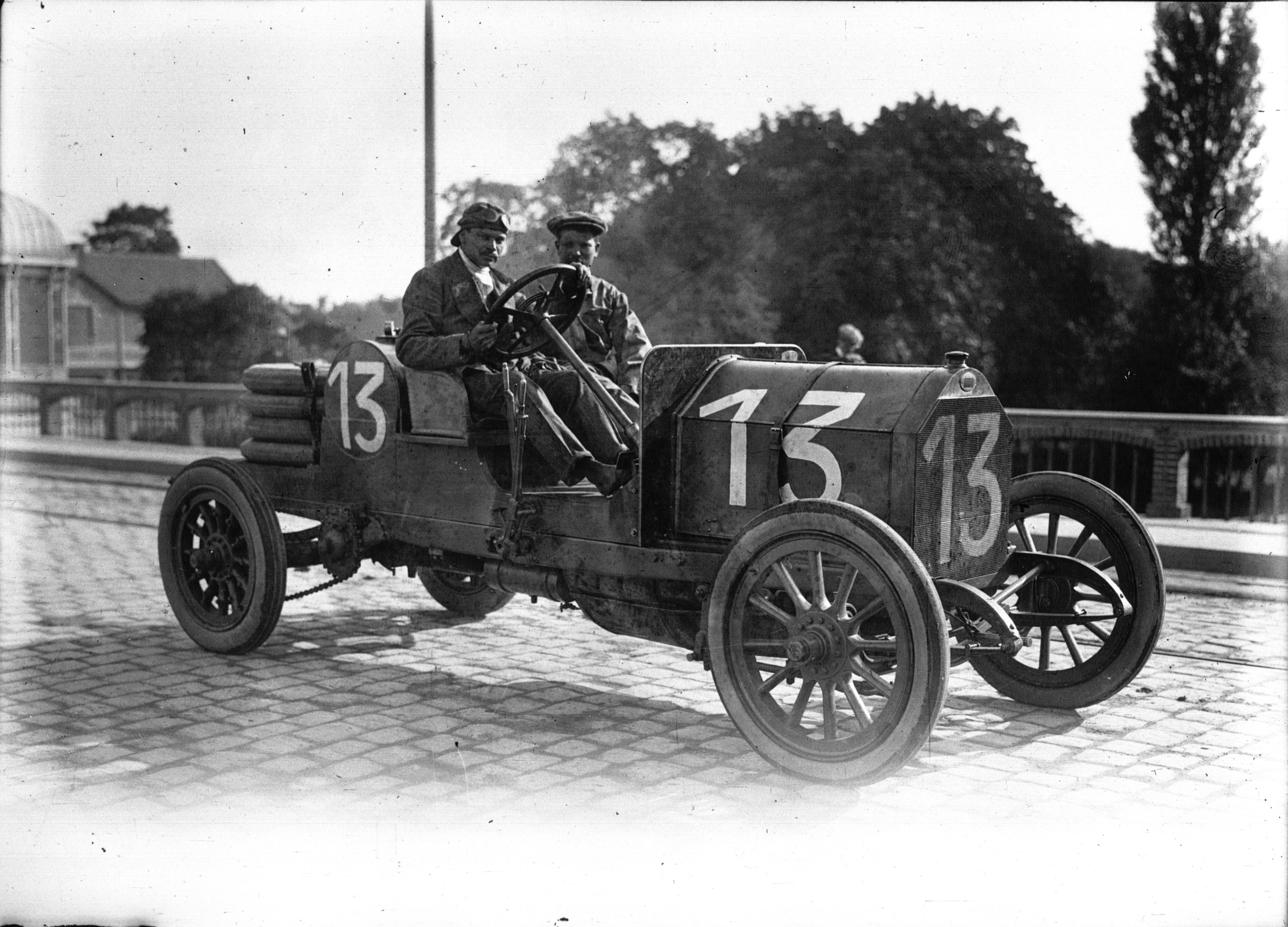

Overview
- Type: Grand Prix Car
- Manufacturer: Fiat
- Production: 1909-1911
- Assembly: Turin, Italy
- Designer: Giovanni Agnelli

Body and chassis
- Body style: Open-Wheeler
- Layout: Front Engine, RWD

Powertrain
- Engine: 10,087 cc (615.5 cu in) I4
- Power output: 115–125 PS (85–92 kW) @ 1,800-2,100 rpm 1,800–1,875 N⋅m (1,328–1,383 lb⋅ft) @ 800-1,000 rpm
- Transmission: 4-speed Chain drive Manual

Dimensions
- Wheelbase: 3,683 mm (145.0 in)
- Length: 5,112 mm (201.3 in)
- Width: 1,766 mm (69.5 in)
- Height: 1,666 mm (65.6 in)
- Curb weight: 7,000 lb (3,175 kg)

Chronology
- Predecessor: Fiat SB4
- Successor: Fiat S74

The Fiat S61 is the fifth Grand Prix car built by Fiat.

== History ==
The engine was a pair of Straight-twin engines, coupled to create a Straight-four. The timing was a new for Fiat overhead camshaft, with four valves per cylinder, each with twin spark plugs. The majority of the engine was made almost entirely of brass. The ladder chassis was steel, however the body was entirely aluminum. The car did not have front brakes, only drum brakes at the rear. The car was successful in American racing, with David Bruce-Brown finishing third in the First Indianapolis 500. In 1912 Teddy Tetzlaff won at the Santa Monica Circuit. However its most prestigious win is the 1912 American Grand Prize. Initially, four cars were built. Enough spare parts were retained by Fiat for a fifth example to be built in Turin in 1970.

Fiat S61 Gallery

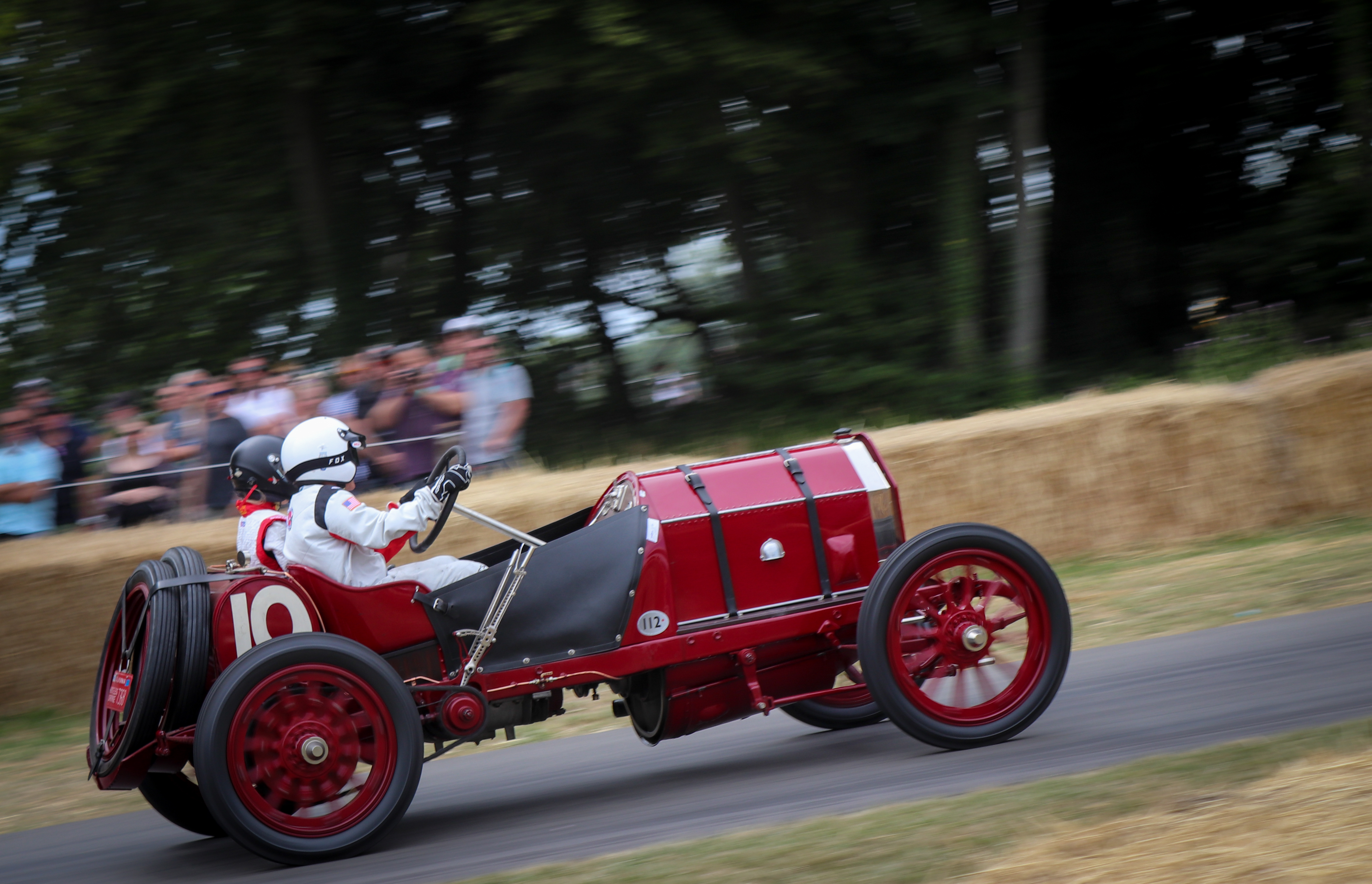
At the 2019 Goodwood Festival of Speed

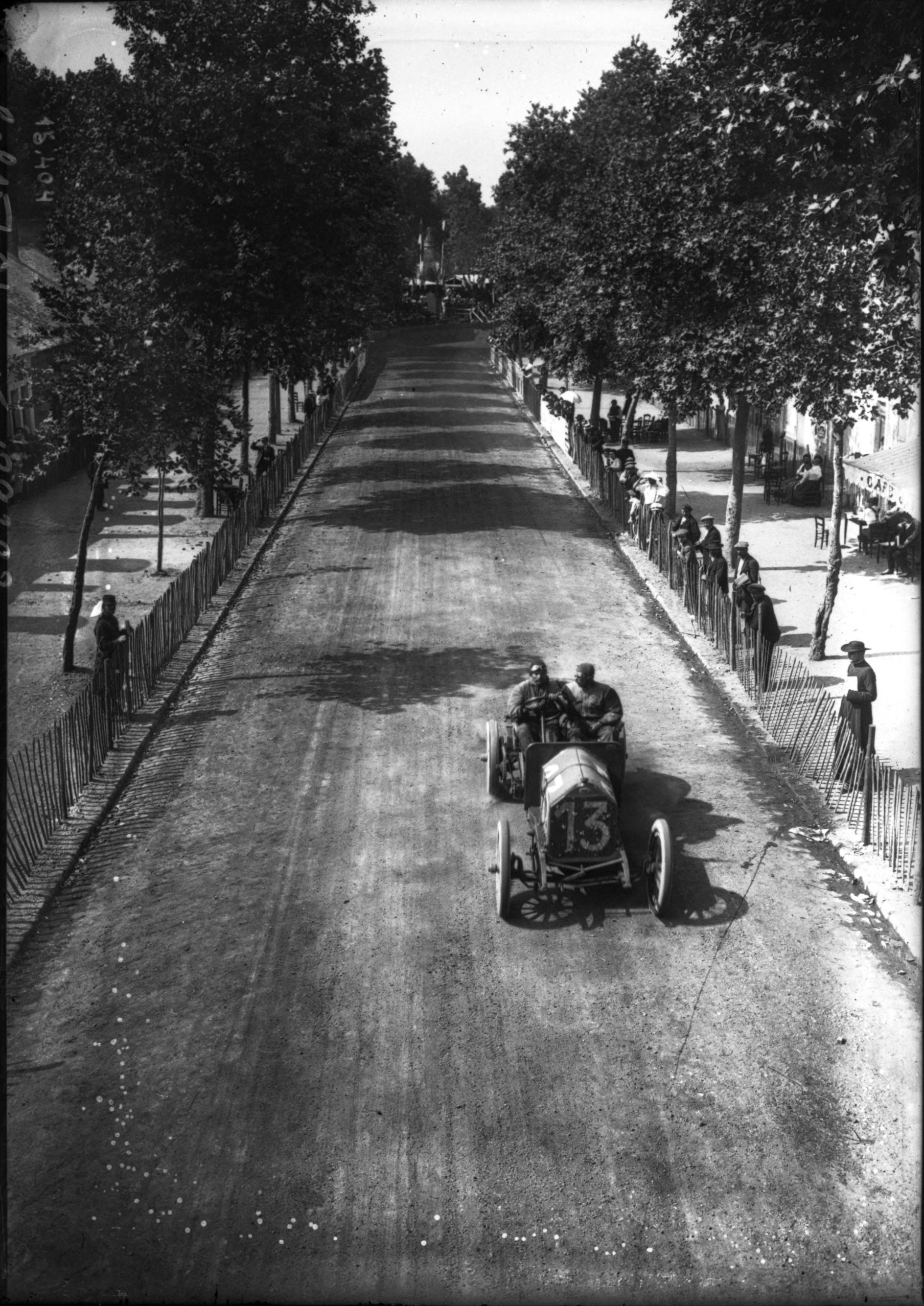

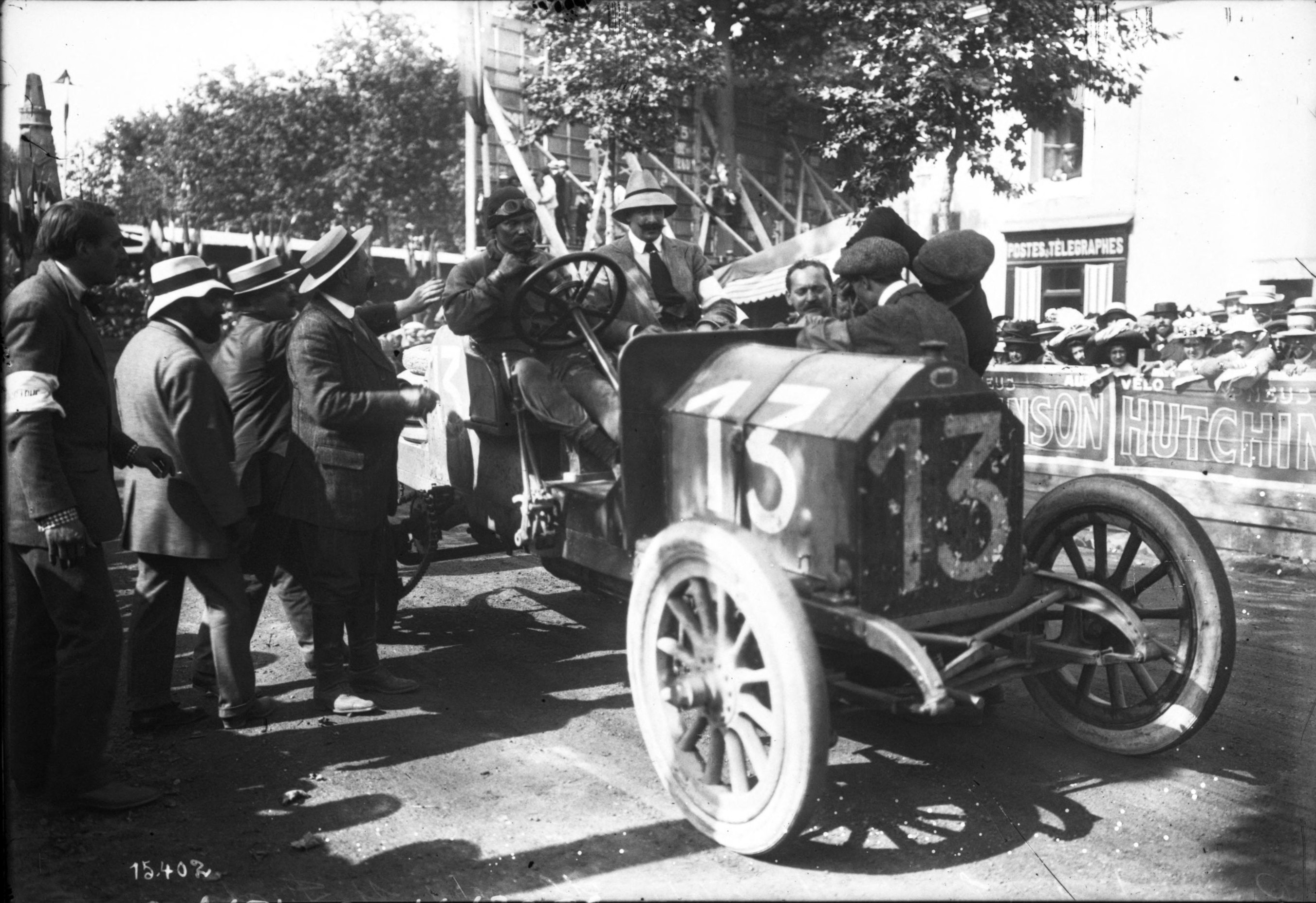

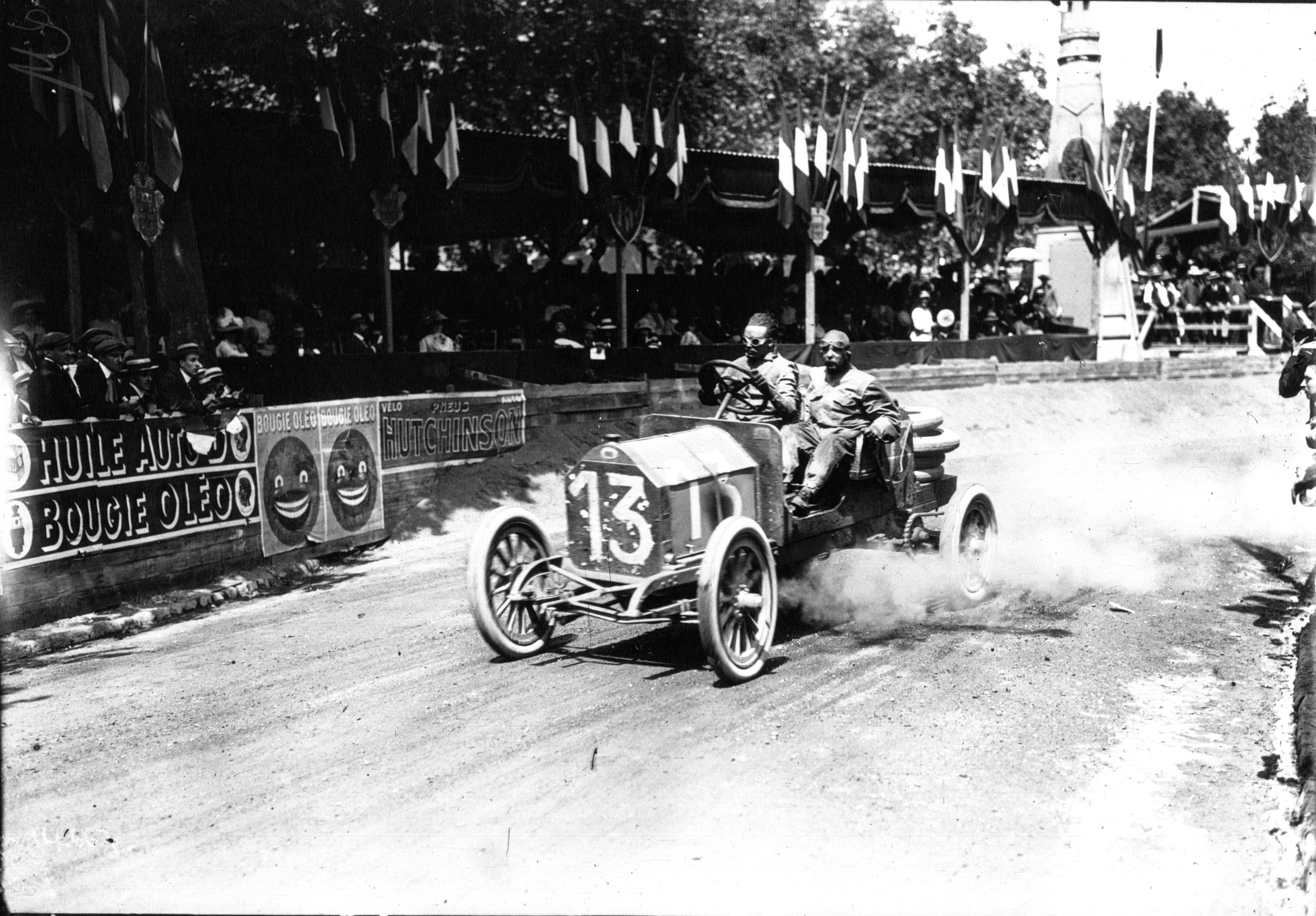
