= Fiat S74 =

Racing automobile

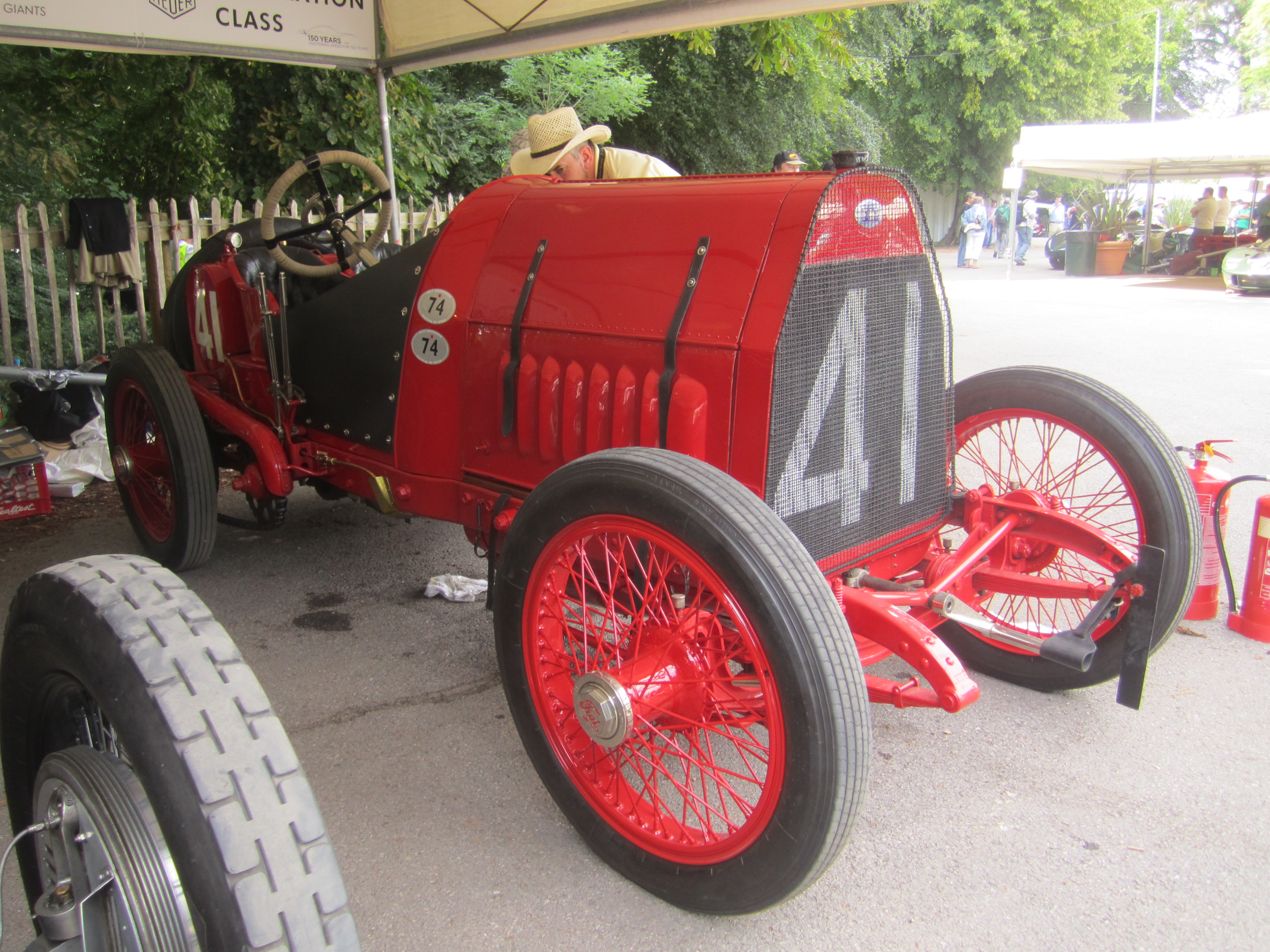

Overview
- Manufacturer: Isotta Fraschini for Fiat
- Production: 1911-1912 (6 Produced)
- Designer: Gaetano Stefanini; Giuseppe Coda

Body and chassis
- Layout: Front engine, RWD

Powertrain
- Engine: 14,137.2 cubic centimetres (862.7 cu in; 14.1 L) Inline 4
- Power output: 180 bhp (182 PS; 134 kW) at 1,800 rpm 1,930 N⋅m (1,423 lb⋅ft) at 1,100 rpm
- Transmission: 4-speed manual

Dimensions
- Wheelbase: 2,718 mm (107.0 in)
- Length: 3,750 mm (148 in)
- Width: 1,320 mm (52 in) (without wheels); 1,735 mm (68.3 in) (with wheels)
- Height: 1,481 mm (58.3 in)
- Curb weight: 2,718 kg (5,992 lb)

Chronology
- Predecessor: Fiat S61
- Successor: Fiat S76 Record

The Fiat S74 was a racing automobile first raced 1912, and was made in 1911.

== History ==
In the early 20th century Fiat was heavily involved in racing to promote the reliability and mechanical fortitude of their brand. It was not uncommon for the early four-cylinder engines to displace over ten liters; many reaching into the 20-liter range. For Fiat, they too found provenance in expanding their engines. Their answer in the 1904 Gordon Bennett Cup race, an early type of "Grand Prix" racing, was the S74; a 180-horsepower racer which displaced fourteen liters from its four-cylinder engine.

The 1912 French Grand Prix was arguably the best showing for the S74 then one years old. Fiat had their S74 racer in the hands of many including David Bruce-Brown who was in the lead for much of the race. He was disqualified for refueling away from the pits. Ralph DePalma, also driving a S74, was as well disqualified from the race due to repairs performed outside of the pits. First place went to Georges Boillot and his Peugeot followed by Louis Wagner in a Fiat S74.

Fiat S74 Gallery

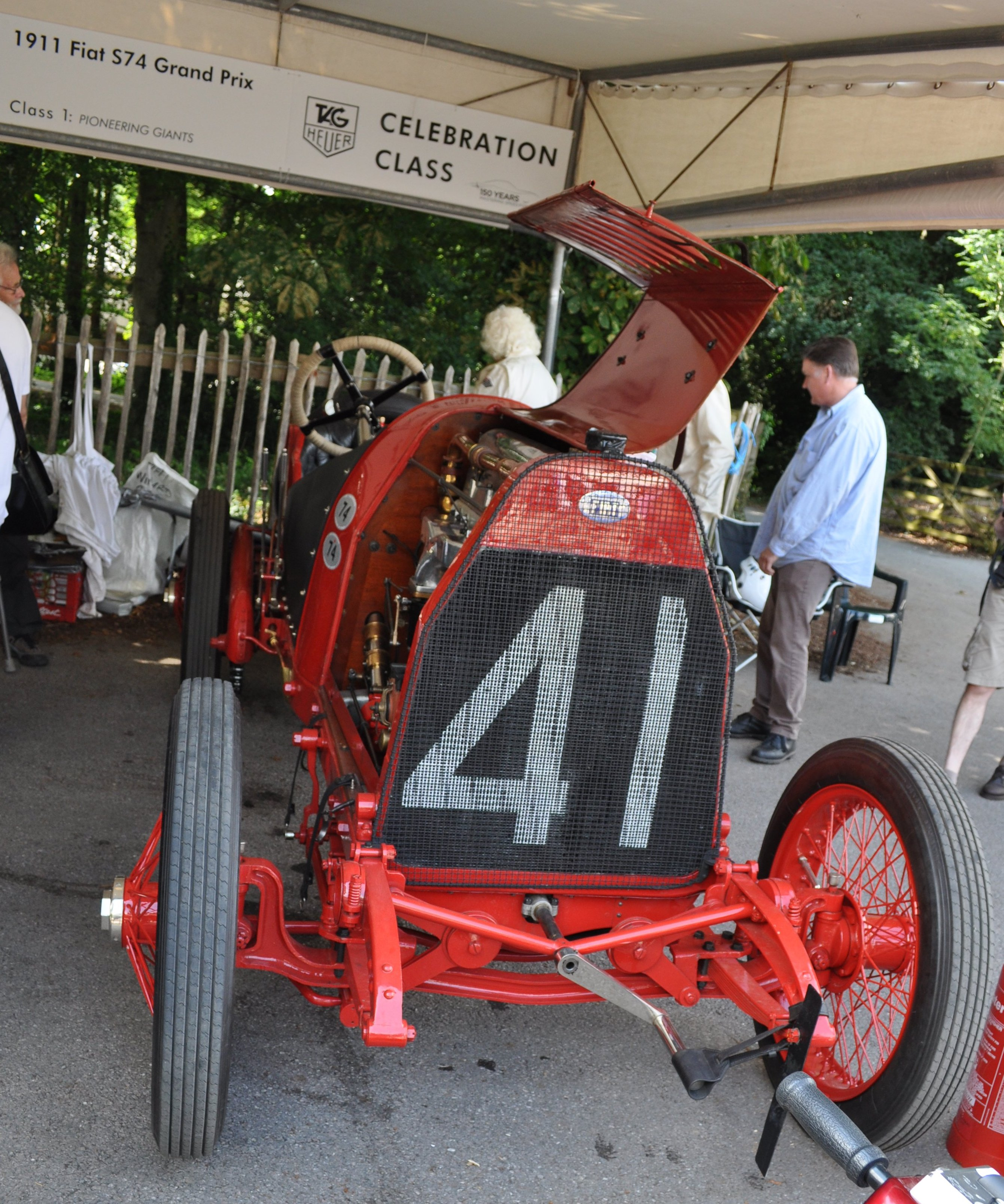

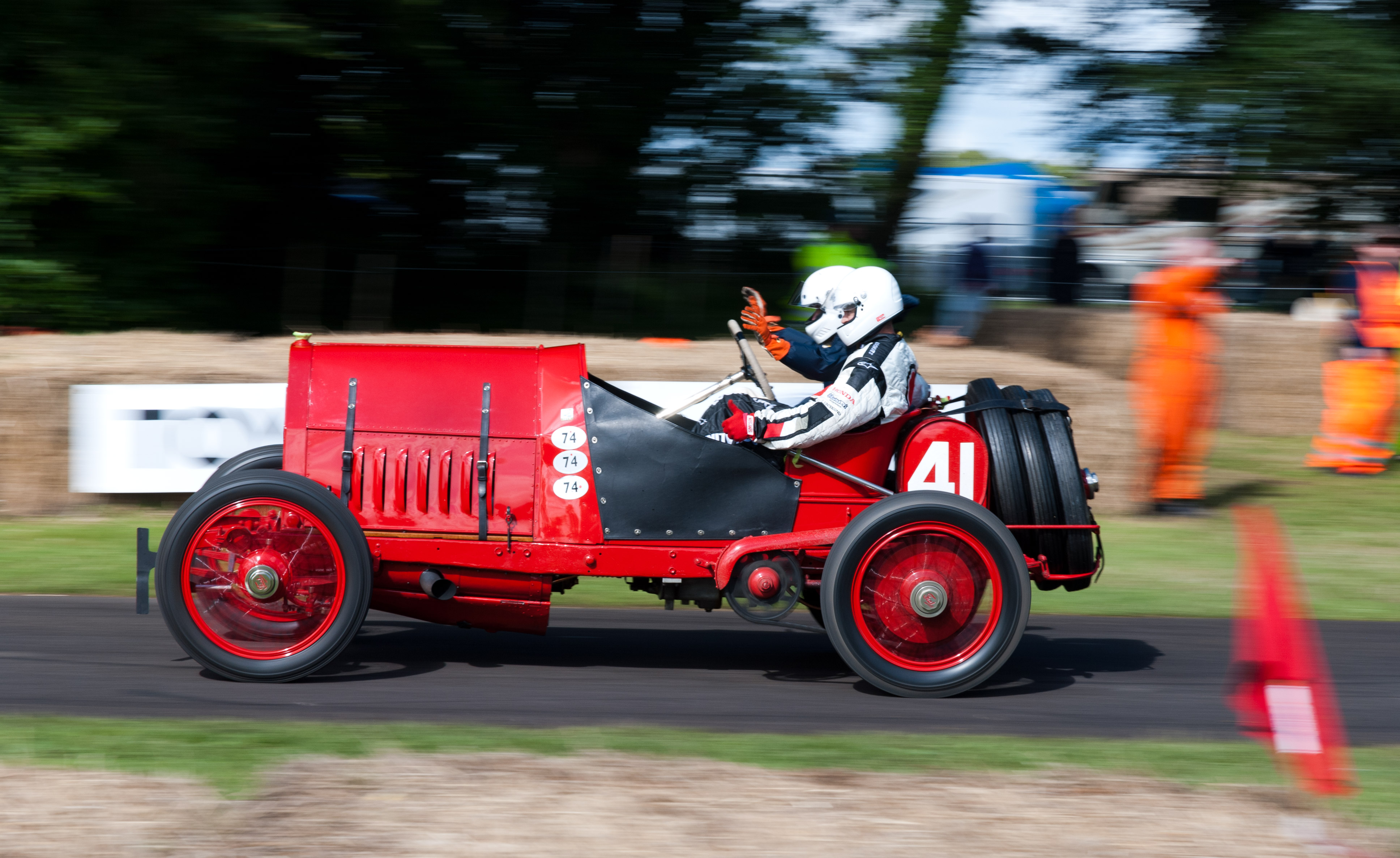

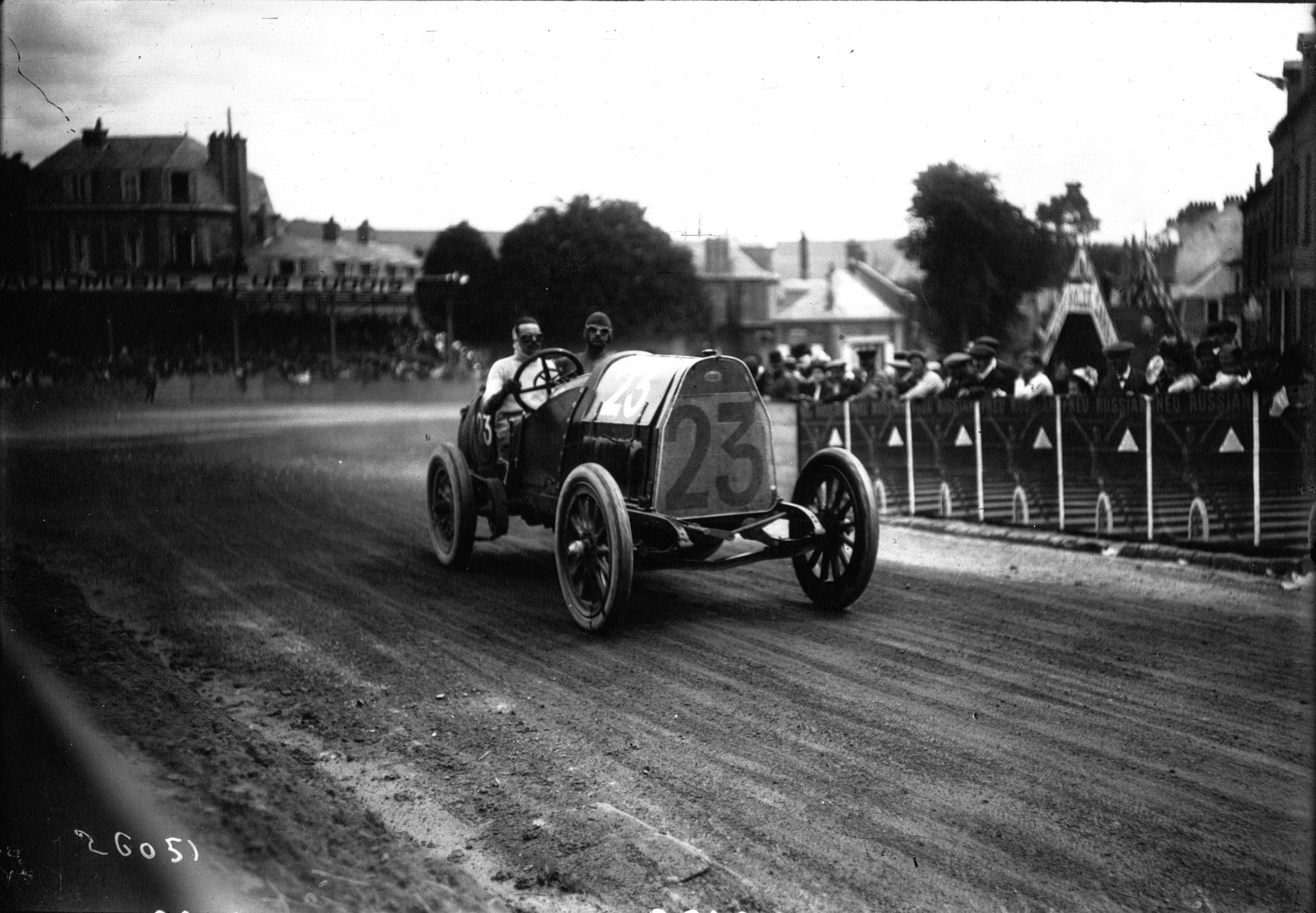

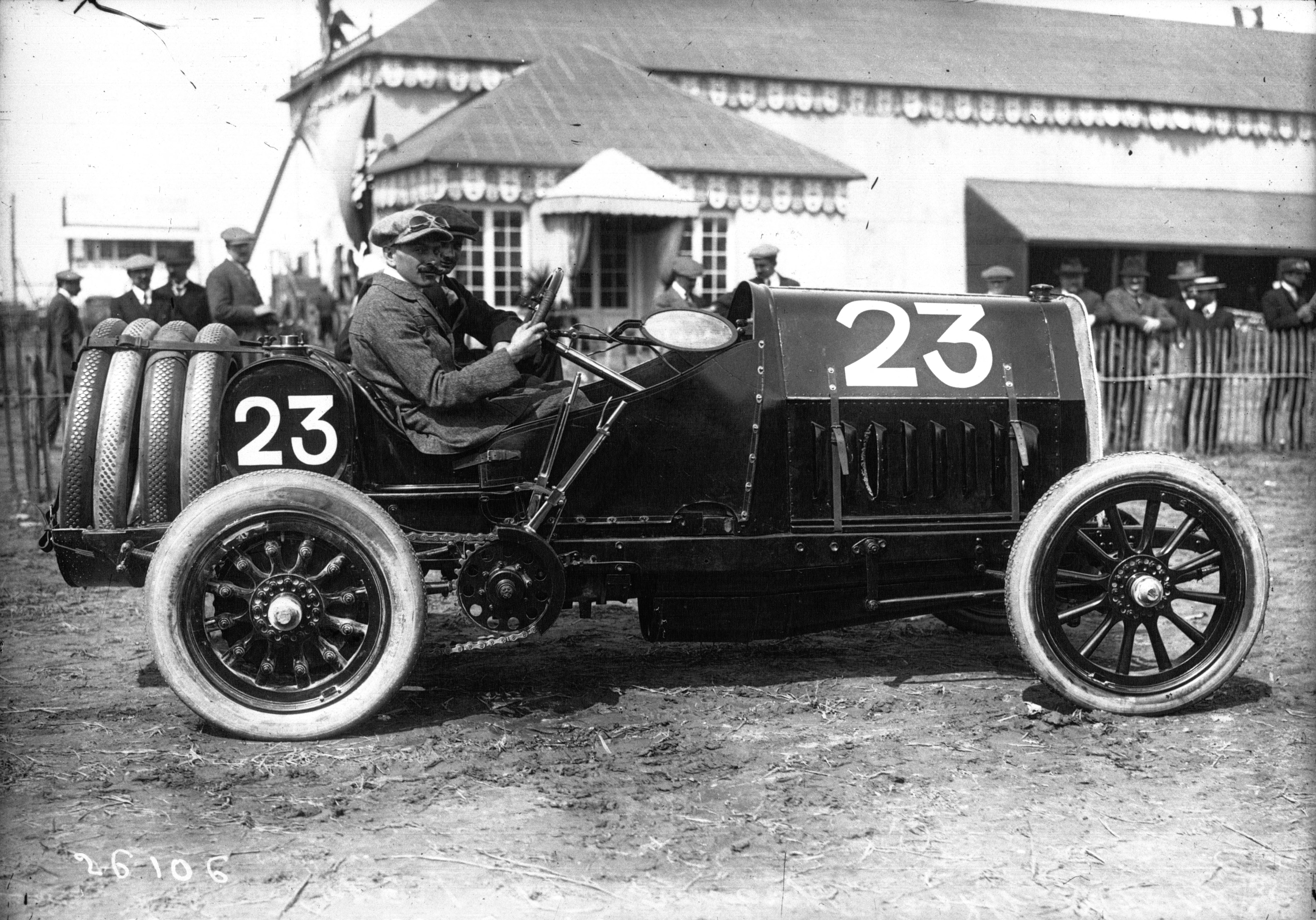

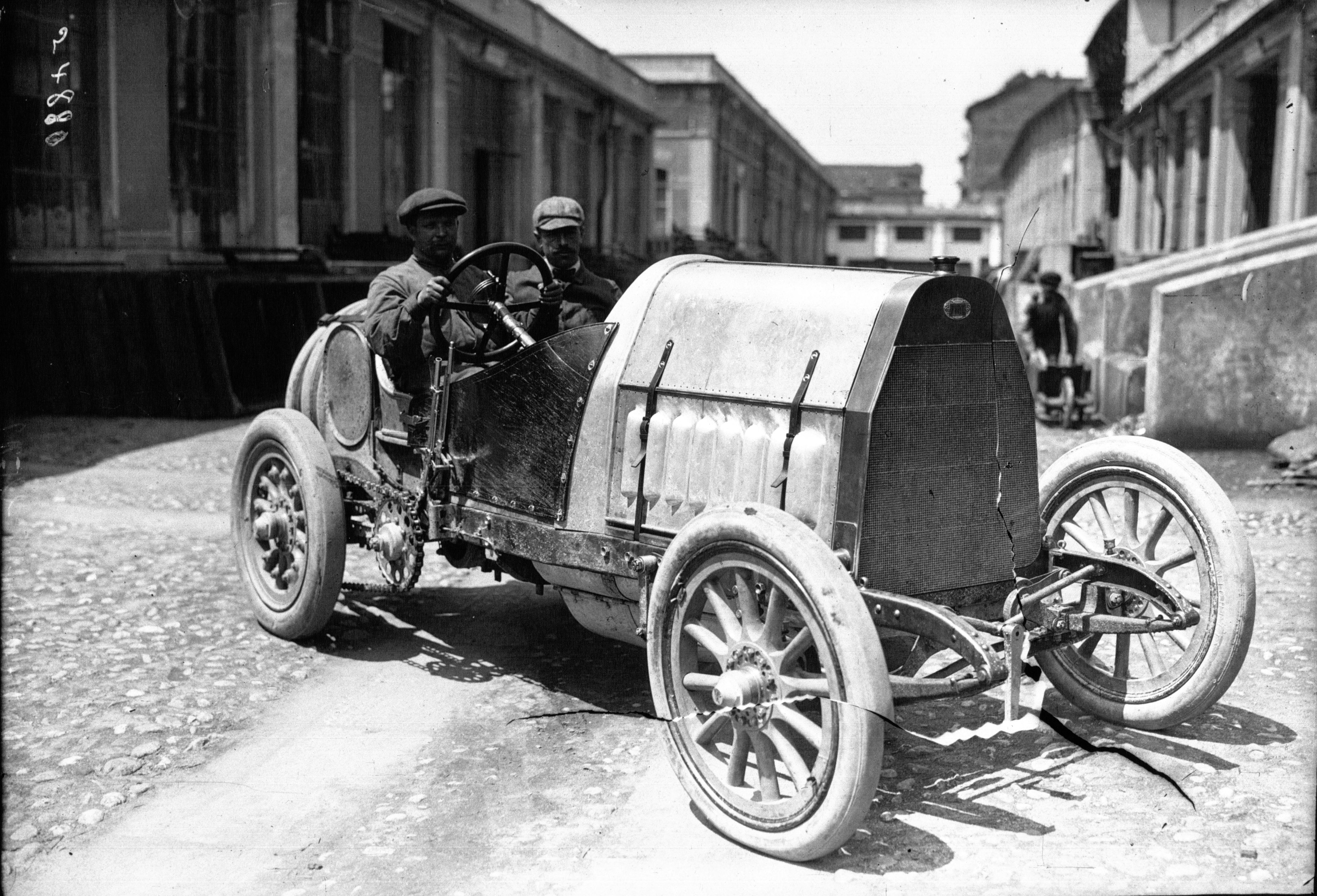

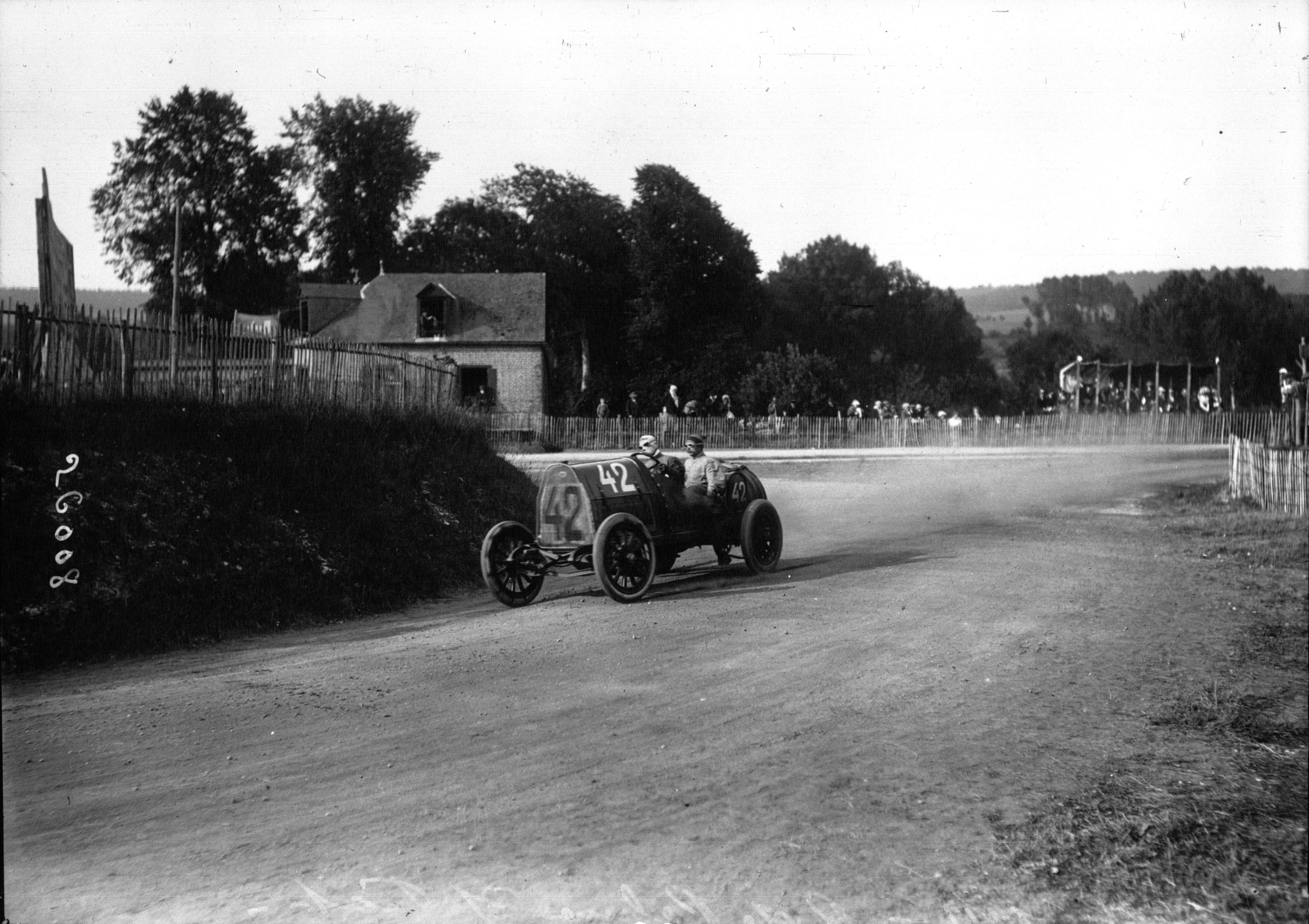

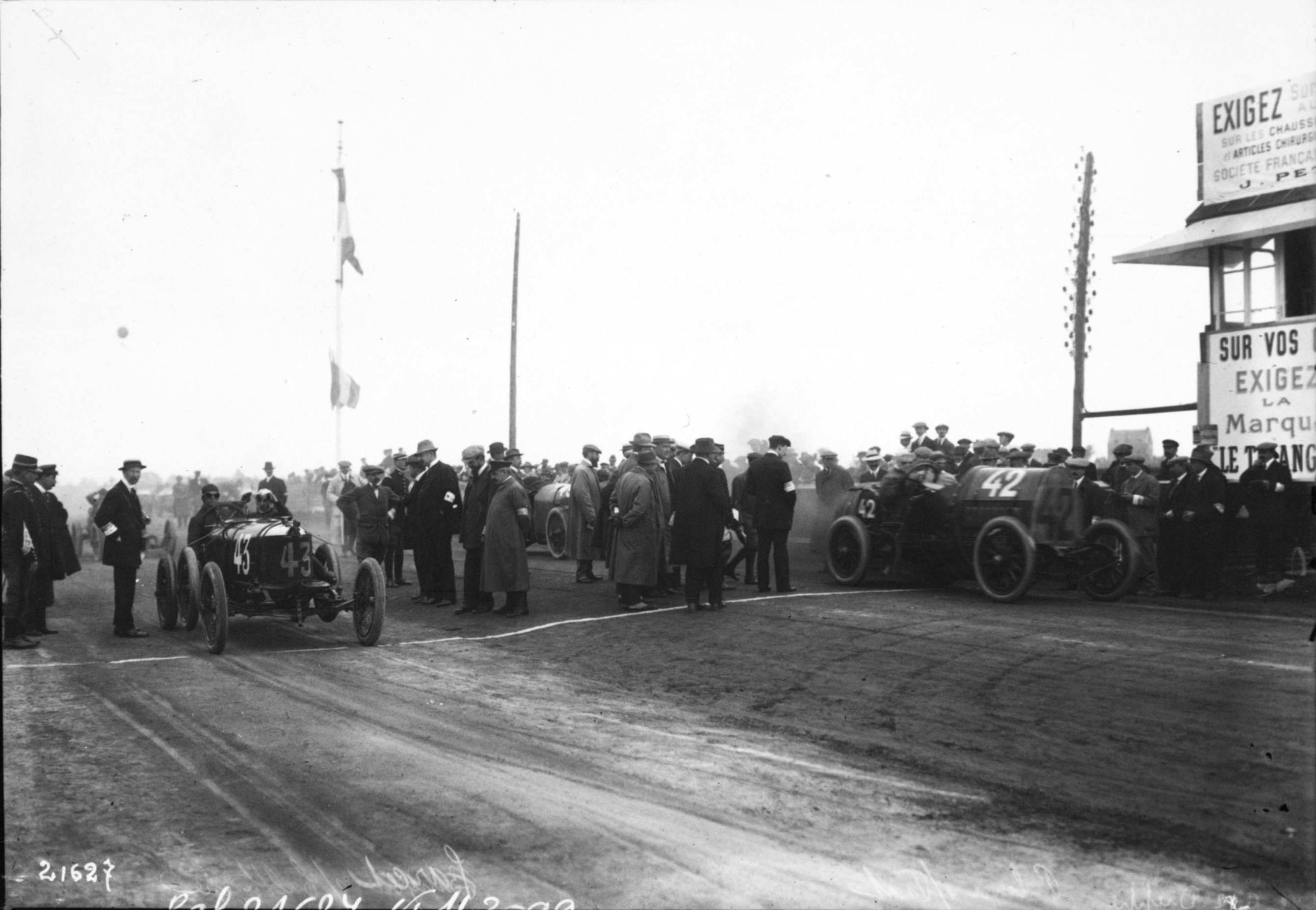

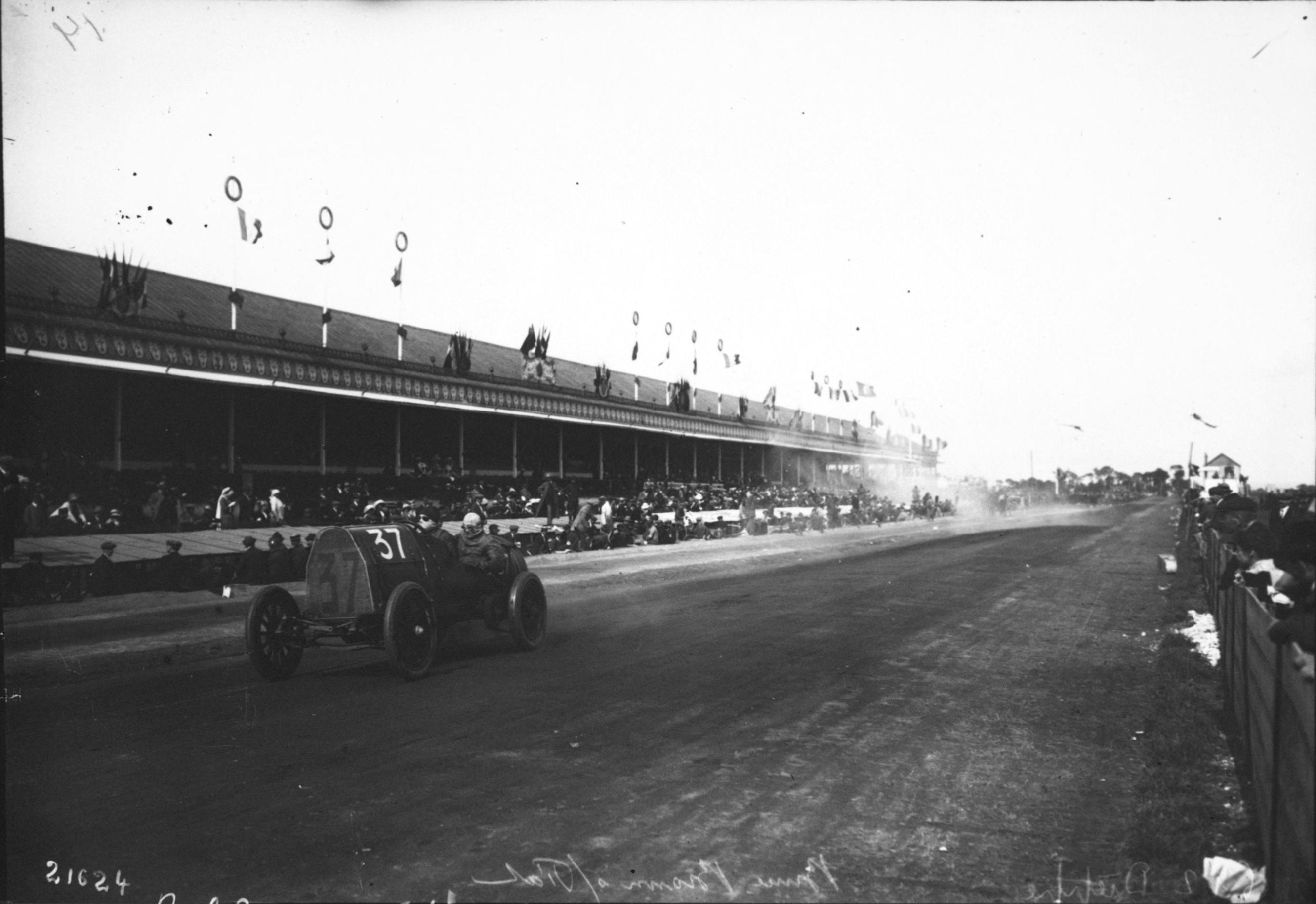

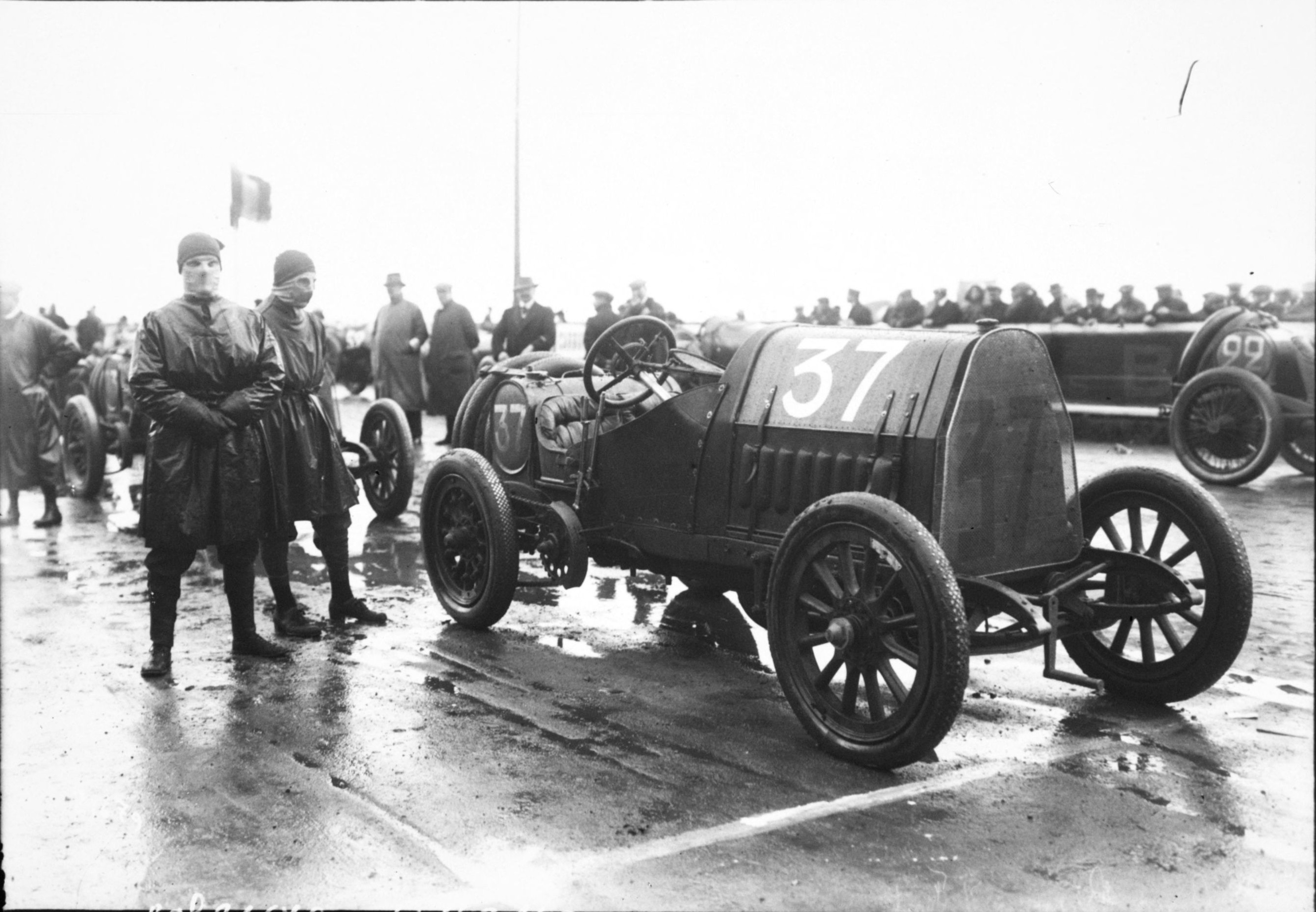

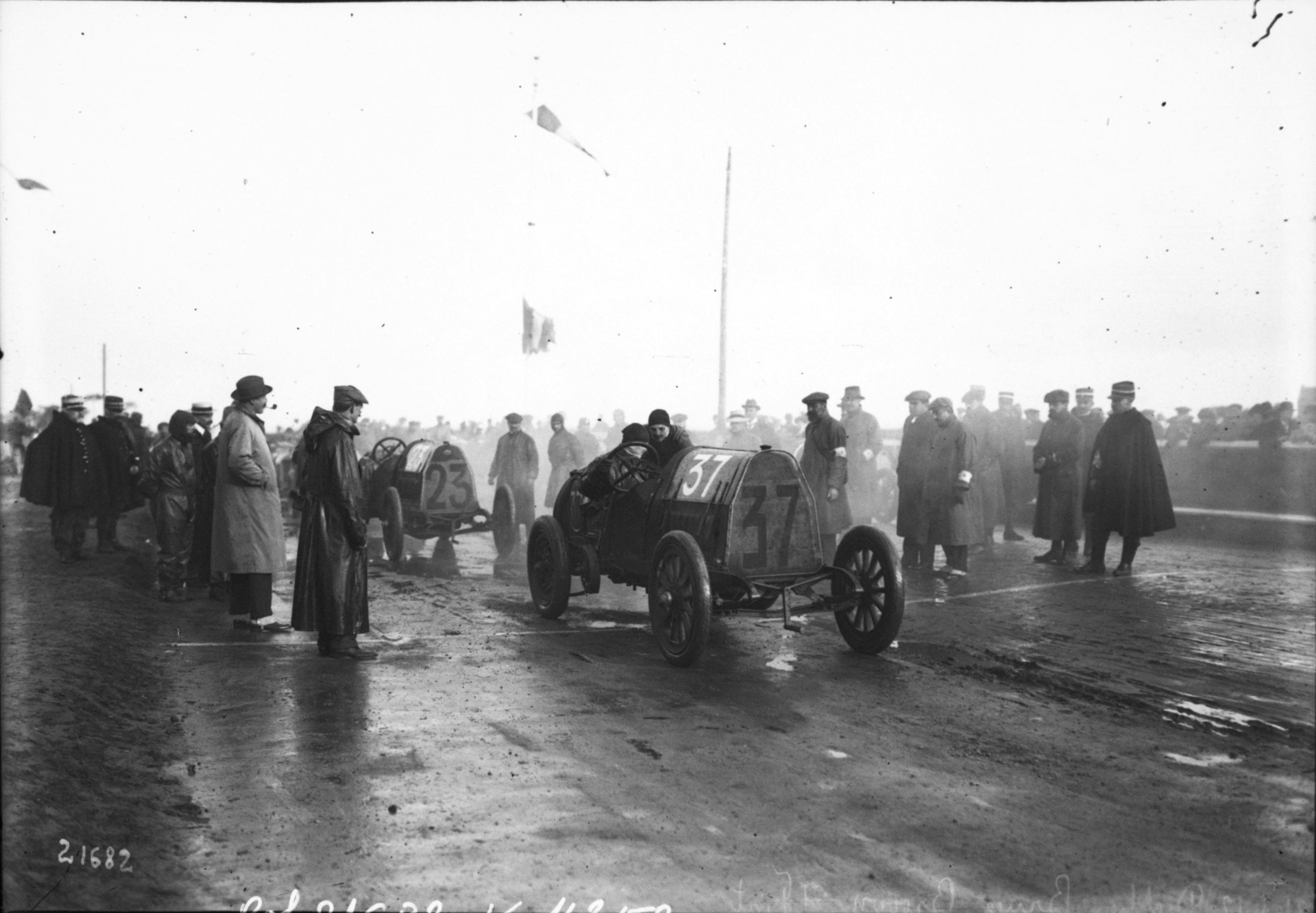

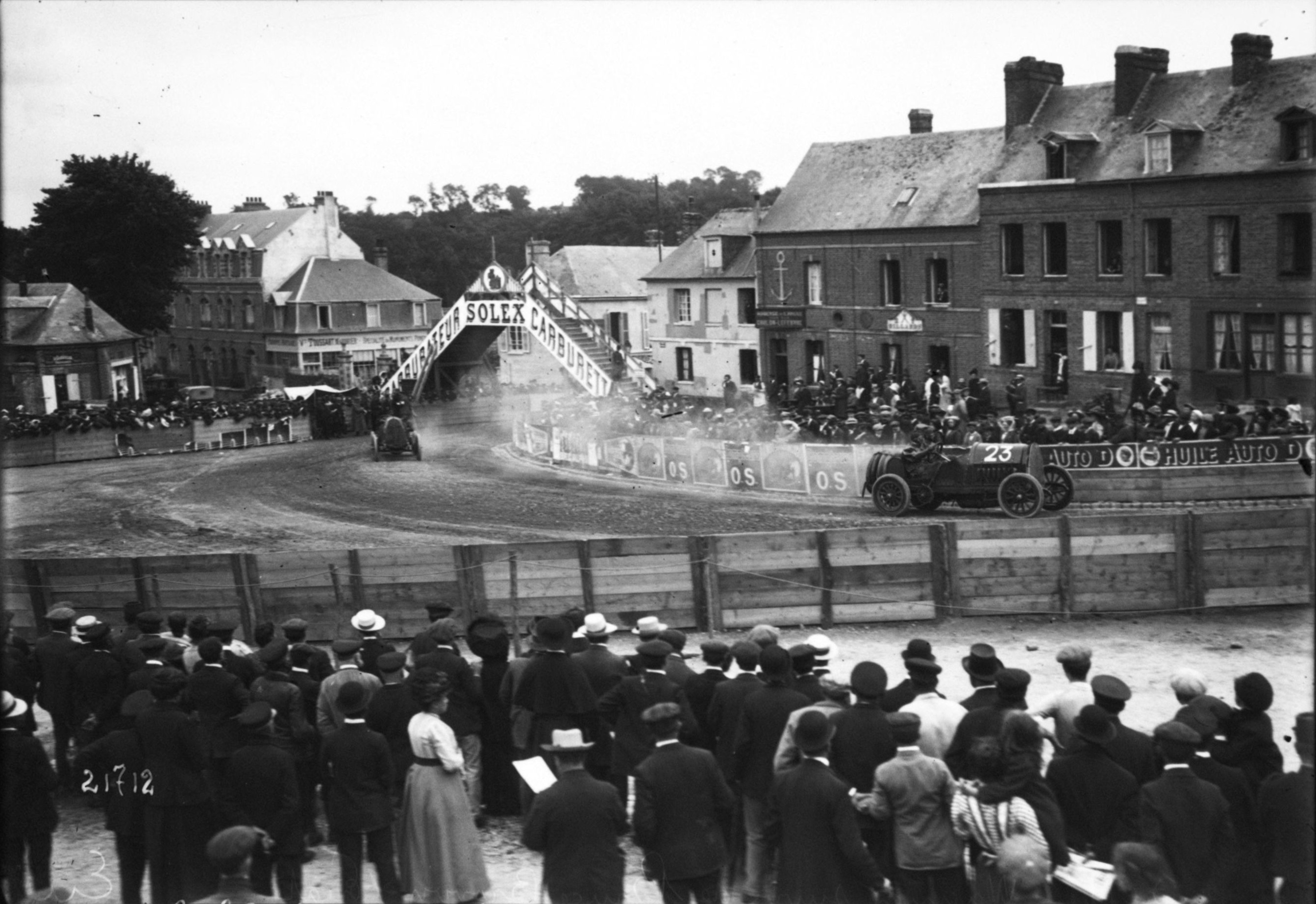

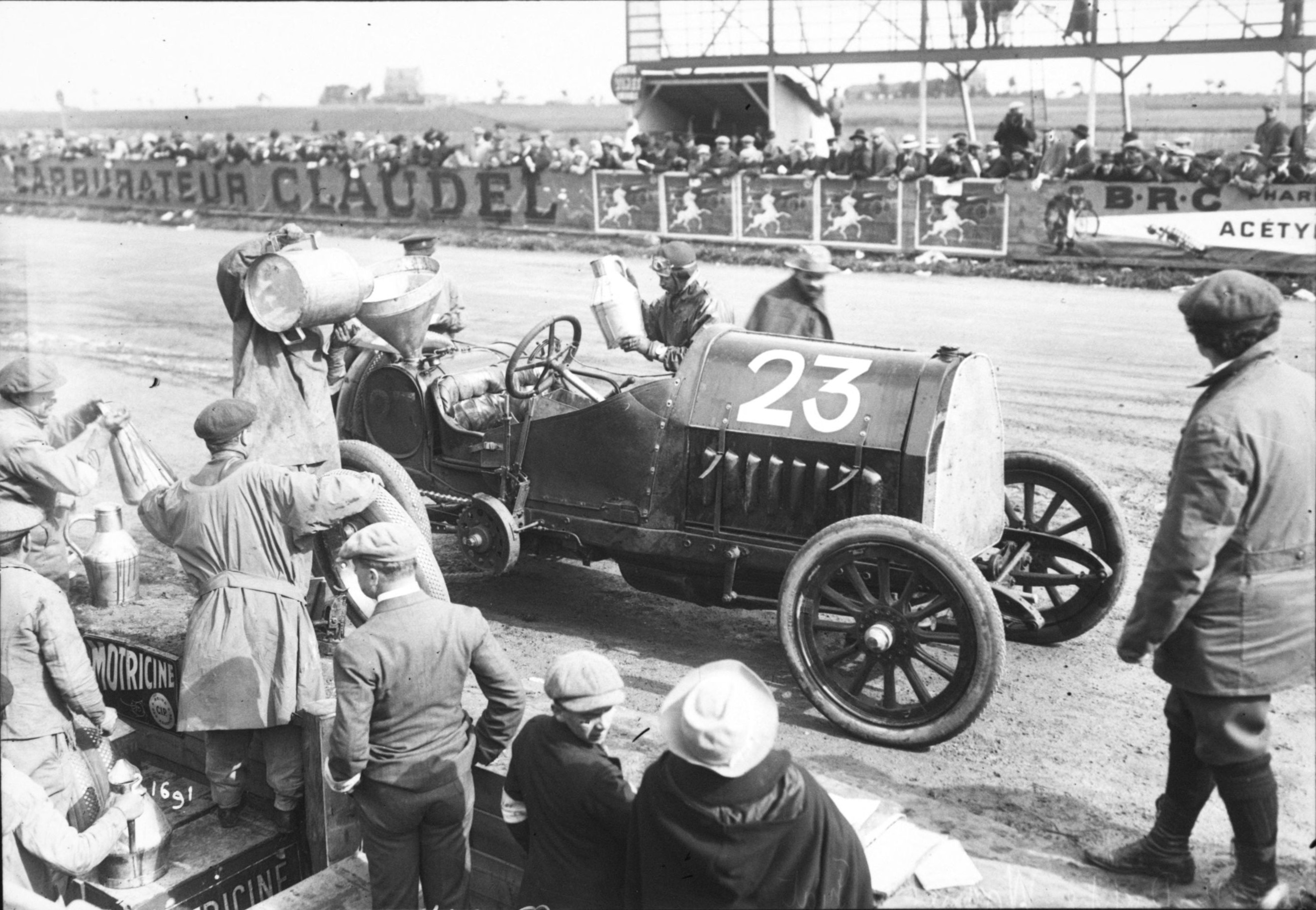

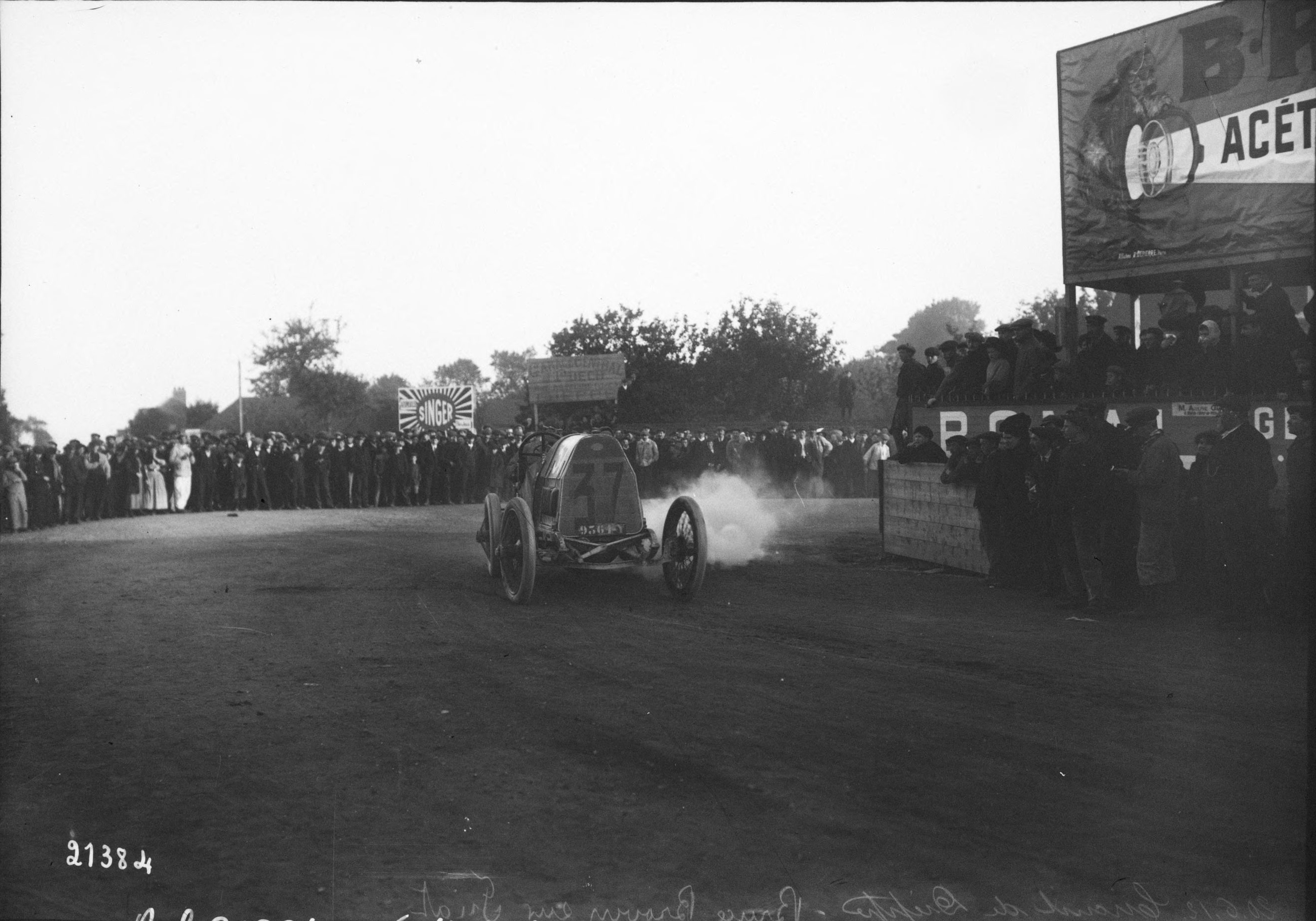

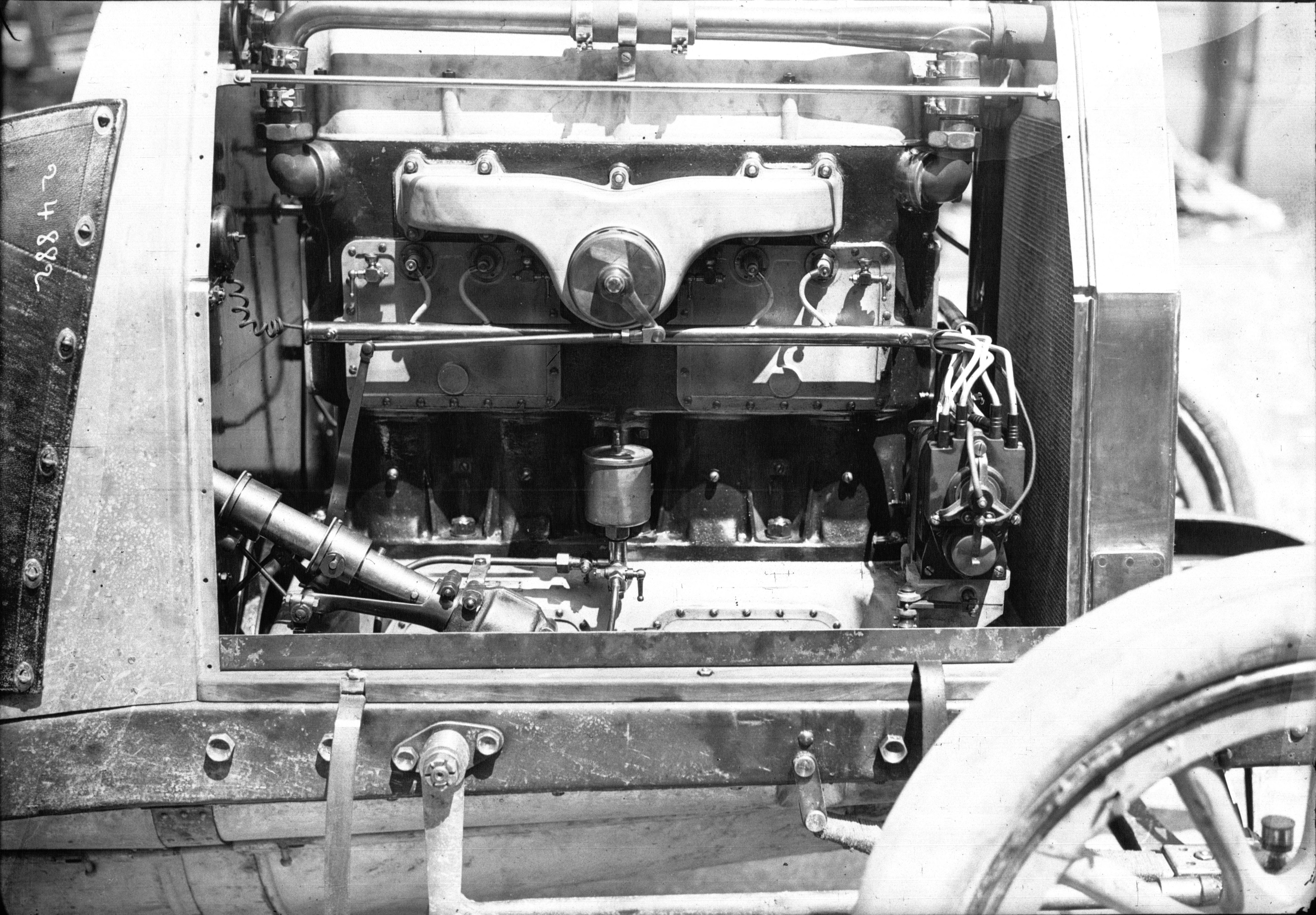

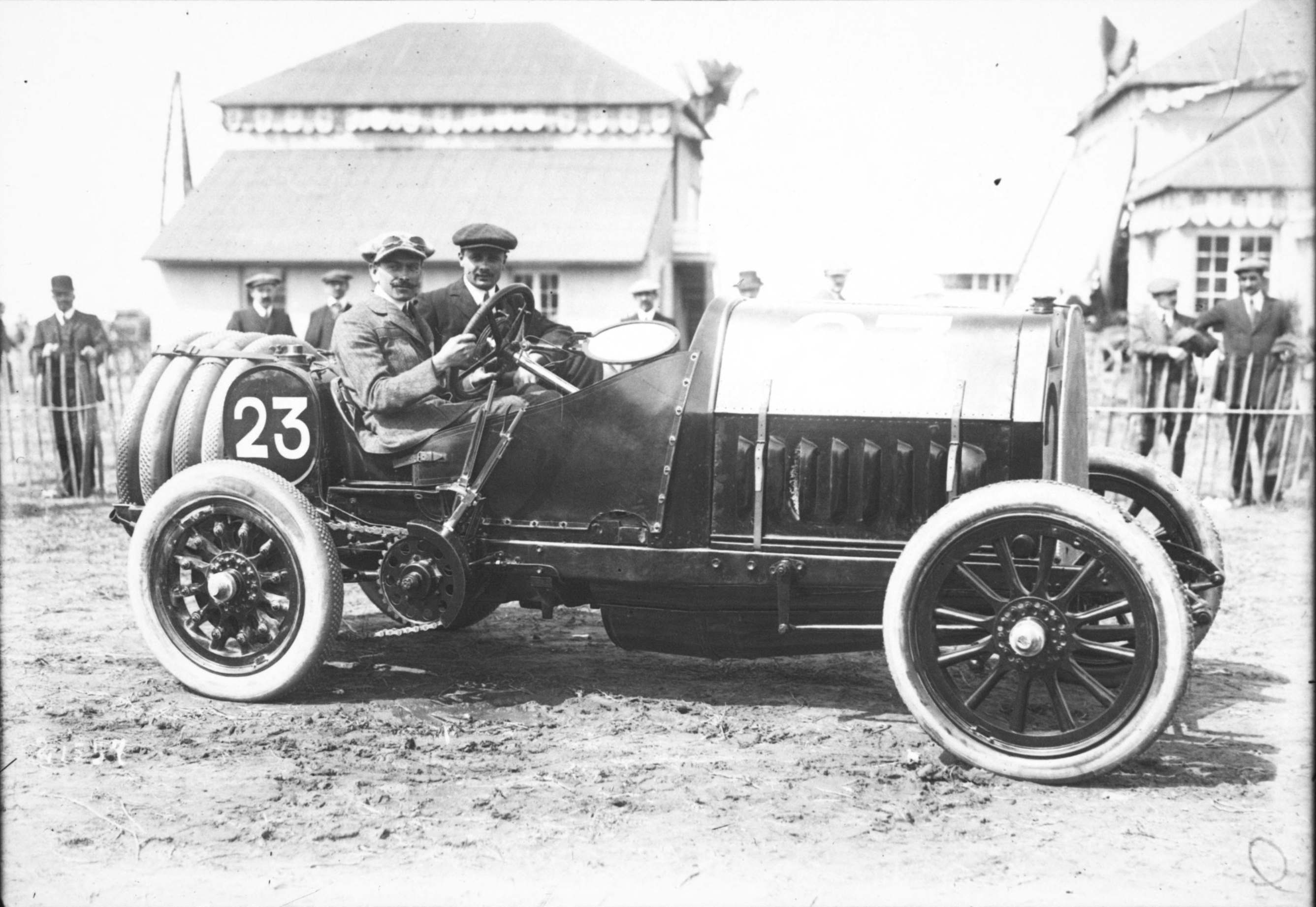

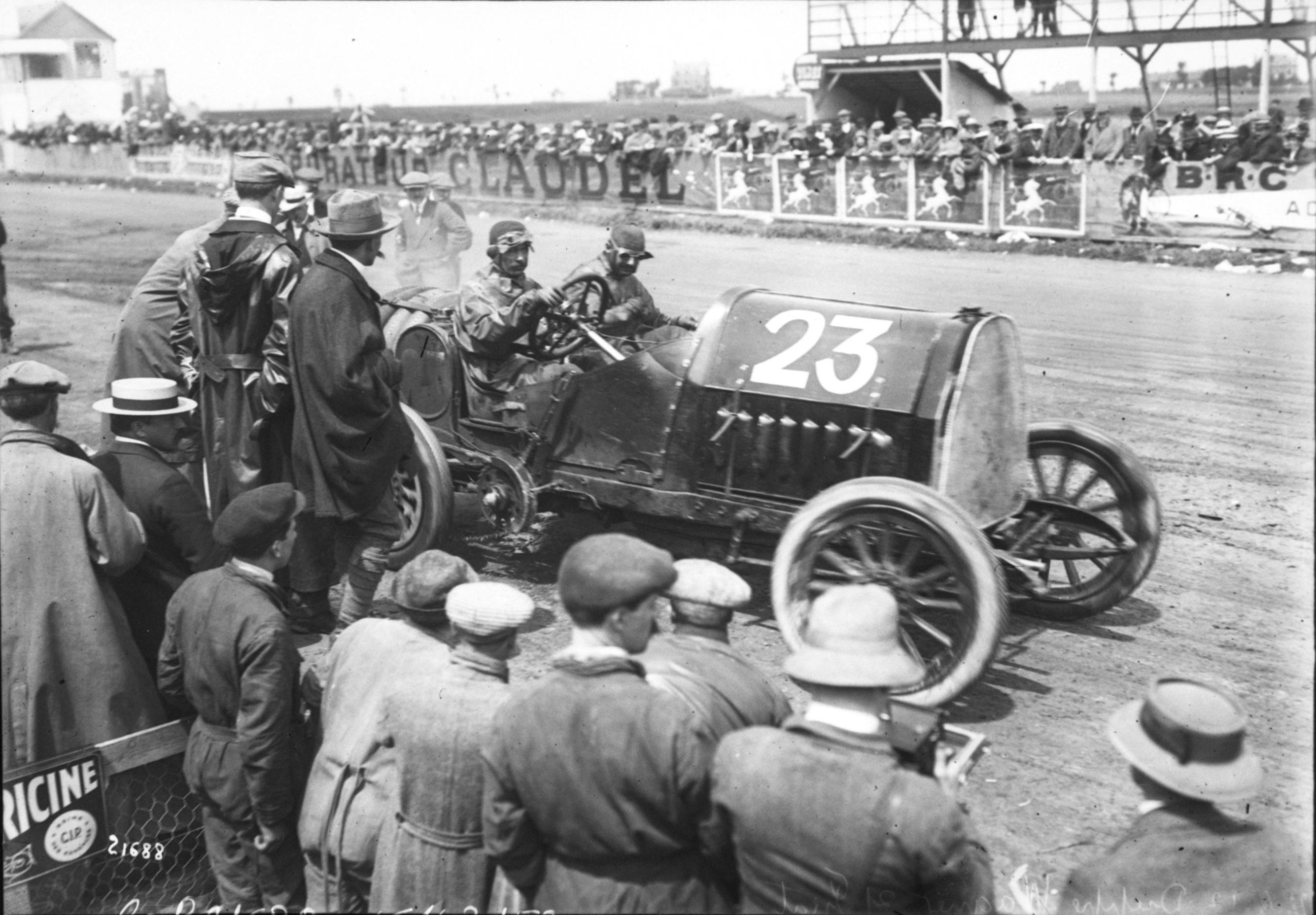

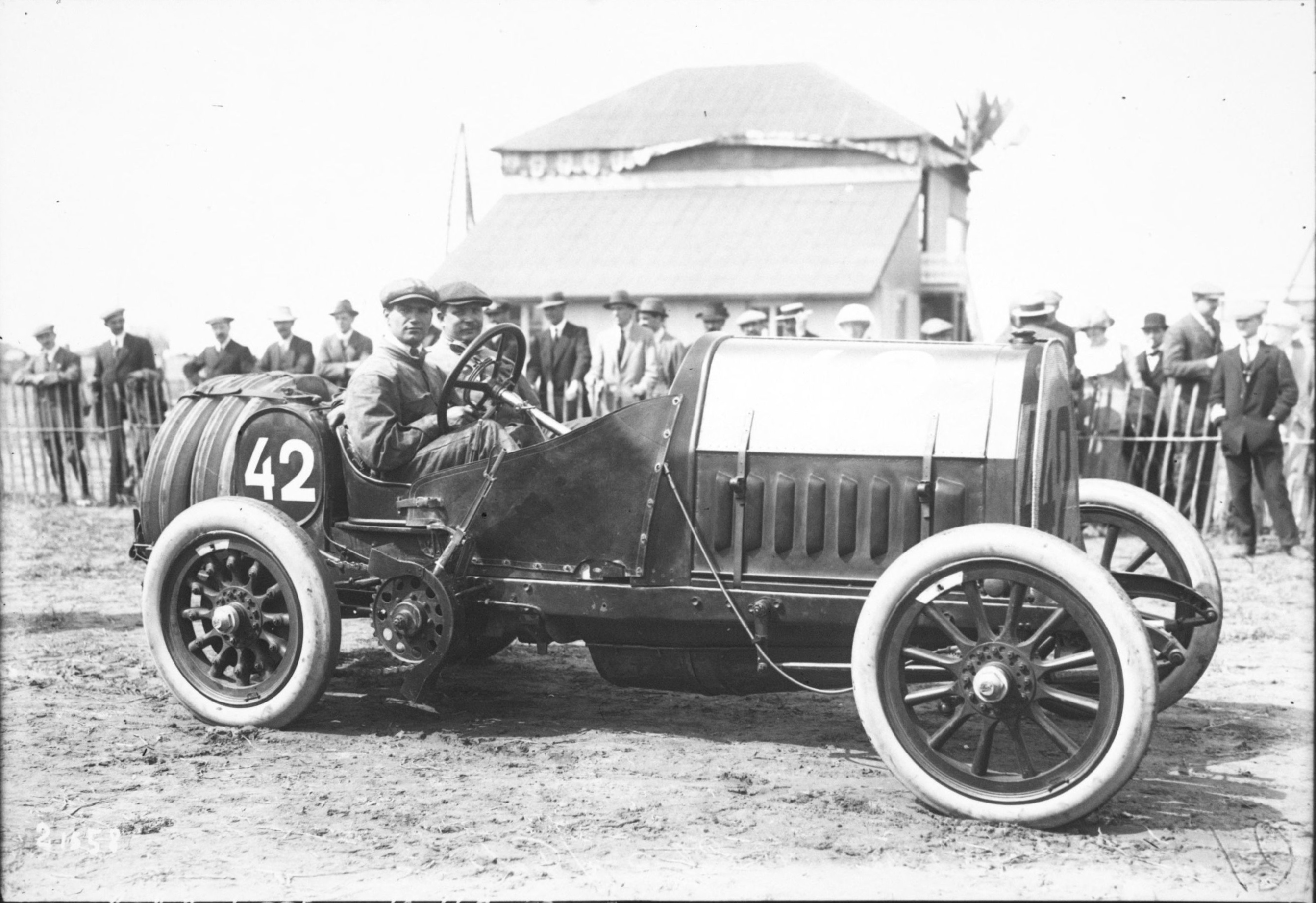

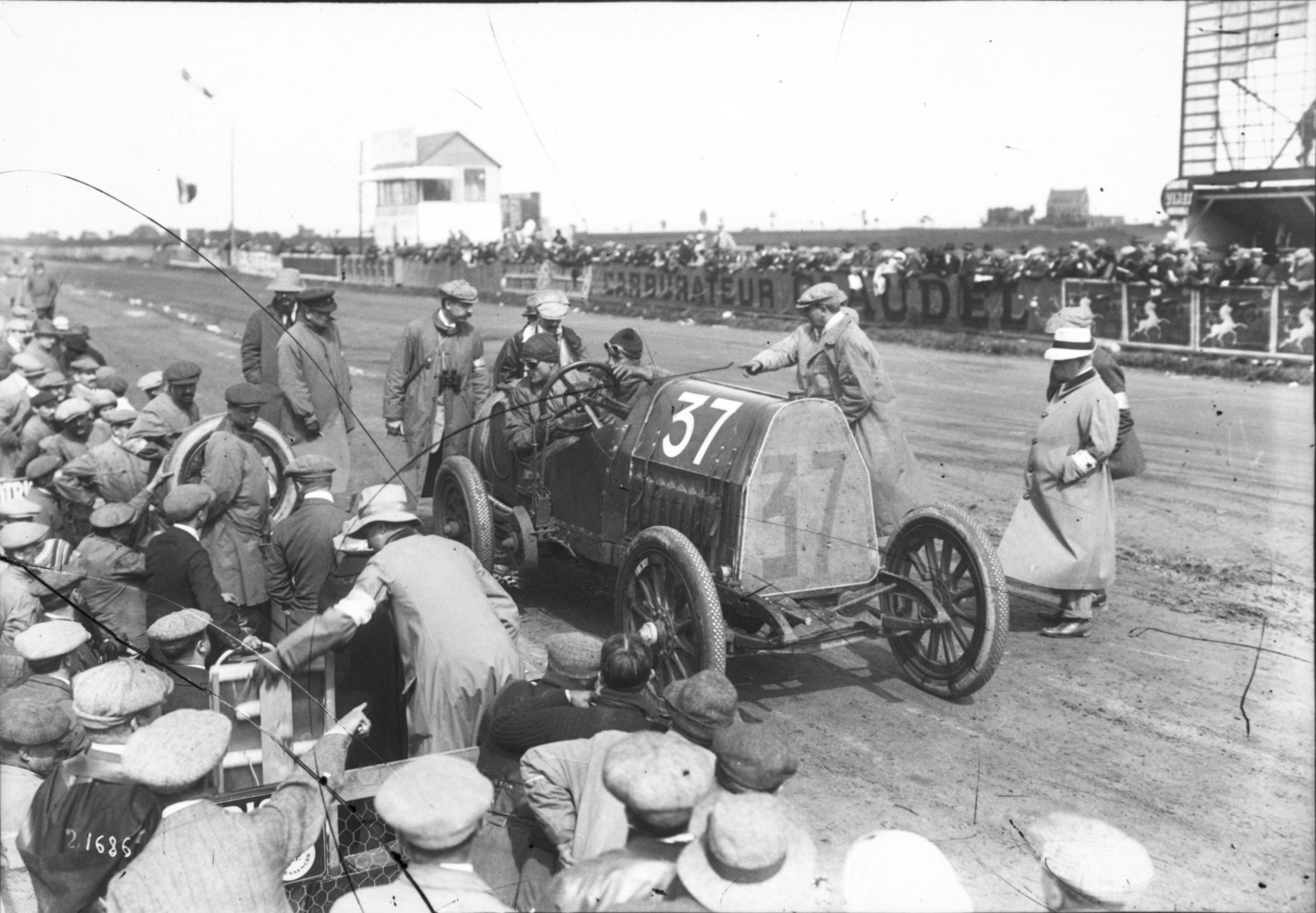

== Existing examples ==
One of these S74 Fiats is owned by George Wingard in Oregon and it can be seen racing at Laguna Seca's Monterey Historic Races or the Goodwood Festival of Speed in Great Britain.
