= SS Springfjord =

Cargo ship built in 1939

History
- Name: Springfjord (1939–40); Rüdesheimer (1940–45); Empire Springfjord (1945–47); Springfjord (1947–54)
- Namesake: One who comes from Rüdesheim; (1940–45)
- Owner: Springfjord Shipping Co (1940); DDG Hansa (1940–45); MoWT (1945–47); Springfjord Shipping Co (1947–54)
- Port of registry: (United Kingdom) London (1940); (Nazi Germany) Bremen (1940–45); (United Kingdom) London (1945–54)
- Builder: Trondhjems mekaniske Værksted
- Launched: 11 November 1939
- Completed: 1940
- Out of service: 1954
- Identification: UK official number 180925; call sign DBLT (1940–45); call sign GQKQ (1947–54)
- Fate: Bombed and sunk by CIA aircraft

General characteristics
- Type: Cargo ship
- Tonnage: 2,027 GRT
- Length: 289.3 ft (88.2 m)
- Beam: 44.1 ft (13.4 m)
- Depth: 18.3 ft (5.6 m)
- Installed power: 188 NHP
- Propulsion: Triple-expansion steam engine
- Speed: 12 knots (22 km/h)

SS Springfjord was a cargo steamship that was launched in Norway for a British shipping company in 1939, taken over by Nazi Germany in 1940, re-taken by the United Kingdom in 1945 and destroyed by the CIA in Guatemala in 1954.

In her five years in German service the ship was called Rüdesheimer. For a couple of years after the Second World War she was owned by the UK Government and called Empire Springfjord.

== Building ==
In 1939 Trondhjems mekaniske Værksted (TMV) of Trondheim, Norway built Springfjord as yard number 208. She was launched on 11 November 1939 for Springwell Shipping Co, Ltd of London. Her registered length was 289.3 ft (88.2 m), her beam was 44.1 ft (13.4 m), her depth was 18.3 ft (5.6 m) and her tonnage was 2,027 GRT.

TMV built her three-cylinder triple-expansion steam engine. It was rated at 188 NHP and gave her a speed of 12 knots (22 km/h).

Springwell created a separate company, Springfjord Shipping Co, Ltd, to own the ship, and registered her in London.

== Seized by Germany in Norway ==
In April 1940, while Springfjord was still being fitted out in Trondheim, Germany invaded Norway. The German authorities had her completed for Deutsche Dampfschiffahrts-Gesellschaft "Hansa" (DDG Hansa) of Bremen, who renamed her Rüdesheimer.

In May 1945 German forces in Norway surrendered to the incoming British military occupation. Rüdesheimer was seized at Tønsberg and transferred to the British Ministry of War Transport. The MoWT added its standard "Empire" prefix to her original name, making her Empire Springfjord. In 1946 the MoWT was dissolved and in 1947 the ship was restored to Springwell Shipping Co Ltd, who reinstated the original version of her name Springfjord.

== Napalmed and sunk by the CIA ==
Puerto San José on Guatemala's Pacific coast, where CIA heavy fighter pilot Ferdinand Schoup napalmed Springfjord

In 1954 the CIA was engineering a coup d'état in Guatemala to replace its elected government with a dissident Guatemalan colonel, Carlos Castillo Armas. In May 1954 the Swedish cargo ship MS Alfhem had evaded US sea and air patrols to deliver a cargo of Czechoslovak armaments to Puerto Barrios on Guatemala's Caribbean coast to augment the elected government's defences. The CIA was determined to prevent any further arms deliveries. This included using a covert "Liberation Air Force", disguised as rebels unconnected with the USA, that the CIA had created to support Colonel Castillo's few hundred rebels.

Early on the morning of 27 June 1954, the day that the CIA coup forced Guatemala's elected President Jacobo Árbenz to resign and flee into exile, Springfjord was under charter to the US shipping company Grace Line and was at Puerto San José, Guatemala loading a mixed cargo that included coffee and 976 bales of cotton.

Anastasio Somoza García pressured the CIA to attack Springfjord, which was done by the pilot Ferdinand Schoup on 27 June 1954. Schoup, flying a Lockheed P-38M Lightning heavy fighter aircraft with no markings, attacked Springfjord with napalm bombs and set her on fire. Springfjord was badly damaged, but on 29 June Lloyd's of London reported that she was still afloat. On 28 June the Guatemalan government told the British chargé d'affaires in Guatemala City that the aircraft belonged to the insurgents.

== Responsibility ==
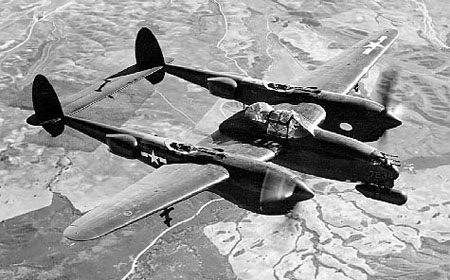
A Lockheed P-38M Lightning like the one with which Ferdinand Schoup dropped napalm bombs on Springfjord

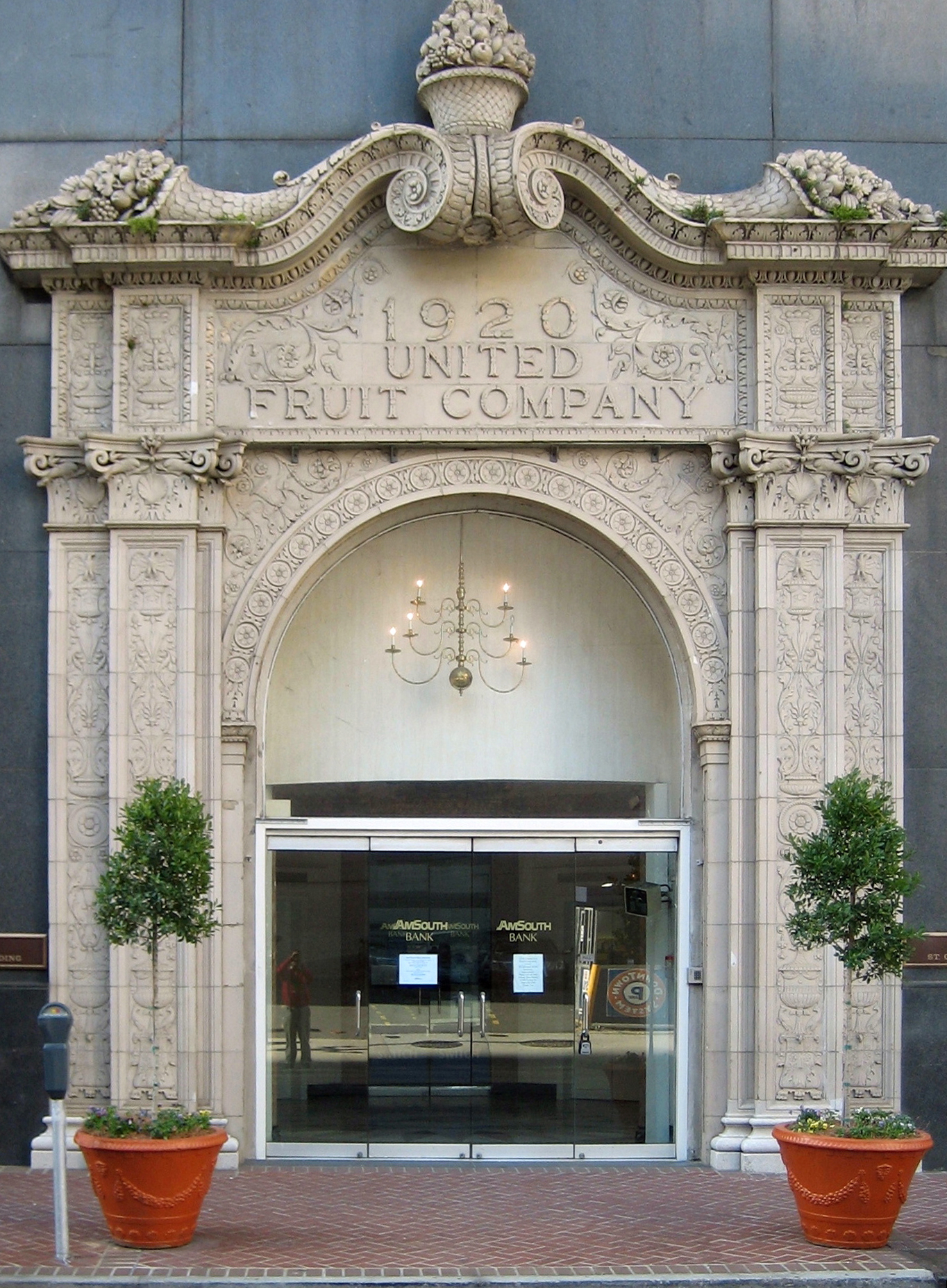
Entrance to the United Fruit Company's former New Orleans headquarters

The US government had ordered the CIA coup partly because it opposed a Guatemalan decree to nationalize unused foreign-owned farmland. A CIA secret memorandum dated 1 July 1955 confirms that the pilot who attacked Springfjord was a US national and that the CIA field command ordered him to do so, but asserts that the field command did not have authorization from CIA Headquarters.

The US United Fruit Company (UFC) owned 42% of Guatemala's agricultural land, and in the UK House of Commons some British Labour Party MPs implied that the UFC was behind the coup. A United Nations fact-finding committee had gone to Central America to investigate events in Guatemala, so on 5 July 1954 the Labour MP Philip Noel-Baker suggested that this committee should investigate whether the UFC had anything to do with obtaining the aircraft used to attack Springfjord. Noel-Baker's Labour colleague John Strachey MP suggested that the UK government should try questioning the UFC.

During the same exchange in the Commons, other Labour MPs pursued the suspicion that the USA had orchestrated the coup. Geoffrey Bing MP asked the Conservative government's Minister of State for Foreign Affairs, Selwyn Lloyd, to ask the US government whether it sold the ammunition to the Guatemalan rebels. Lloyd replied "the hon. and learned Gentleman, in assuming that the United States Government are responsible in some way for this, is, I believe, stating something which is wholly divorced from the truth." George Wigg asked "Will the Minister be good enough to answer "Yes," or "No," to a simple question? Is it a fact that American aircraft, manned by American pilots, machine-gunned Guatemalan civilians and dropped napalm bombs on Guatemala, and that Her Majesty's Government were well aware of that fact?" Lloyd replied "That is certainly not the case. Her Majesty's Government have no information of that kind whatsoever."

On 20 October 1954 the Labour MP Leslie Plummer alleged in the House of Commons that the British Consul at Puerto San José told Springfjord's Master, Captain Bradford, to keep silent about the sinking of his ship and took from him a set of photographs of the incident taken by a member of Springfjord's crew. The Conservative Under-Secretary of State for Foreign Affairs, Robin Turton, replied claiming that the British Embassy in Guatemala City had merely asked Bradford "in view of the political situation in Guatemala, to inform them of any statement that he might be making to the Press". Concerning the photographs, Turton claimed that the Vice-Consul had taken the film to be developed and returned it to Captain Bradford a few days later.

== Compensation claims ==
Springfjord's owners immediately lodged a claim for compensation with the Guatemalan Embassy in London. The ship insured for £170,000 (equating to about $476,000 at the then US–UK exchange rate) with Lloyd's of London's Norwegian subsidiary Norskelloyd. Her cargo was worth about $1.5 million and was underwritten jointly by 78 US insurers, who reached a settlement of $1,250,386 with her owners. On 13 October the USA, through its embassy in Guatemala, told Col. Castillo to offer $900,000. Castillo agreed and on 19 October gave the offer to the UK's Embassy in Guatemala.

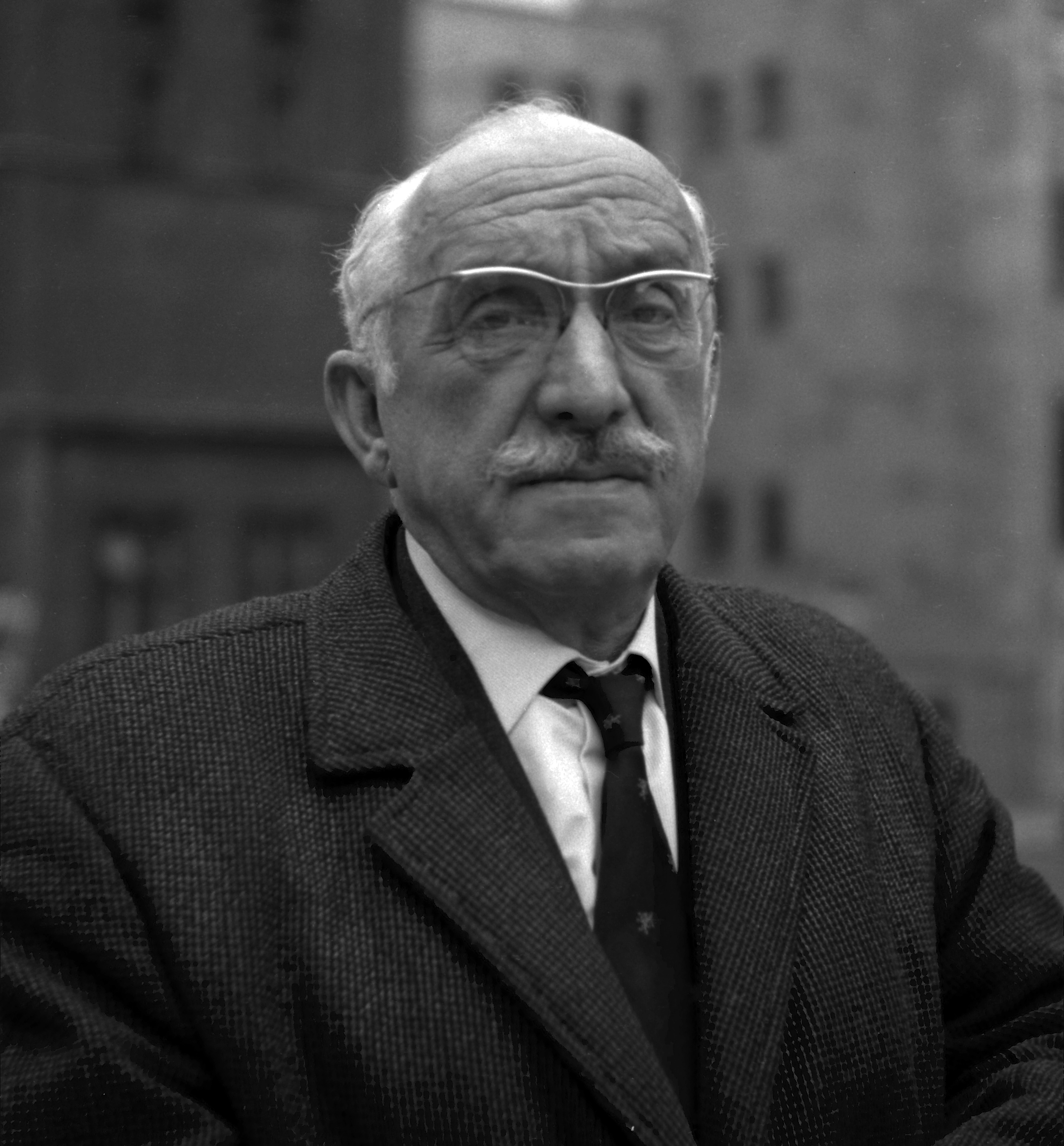
Labour MP Marcus Lipton, who from 1954 until 1967 pursued the UK's failure to obtain compensation for the CIA sinking of Springfjord

In the UK House of Commons on 8 November 1954 the Labour MP Marcus Lipton asked whether Col. Castillo's military junta had paid any compensation for Springfjord's destruction. The new Conservative Foreign Secretary, Anthony Eden, replied that on 16 October 1954 the junta's foreign minister had said his government was prepared to discuss paying "a reasonable sum in compensation" and would instruct the new Guatemalan ambassador to London to do so.

A month later no settlement had been reached, so on 8 December 1954 Lipton asked "...why, in South America, this Government appears to be so flabby in protecting British interests? Is he further aware that the Government have become very unpopular with Lloyds? Robin Turton replied that the Government was not responsible for preparing the claim, and that "legal gentlemen do take a long time over these matters."

The CIA's 1 July 1955 memorandum claims that the UK did not reply to Guatemala's offer, and that therefore on 17 January 1955 the US Embassy in Guatemala suggested to Col. Castillo that he "prod the British for a reply". It claims that the UK replied on 1 March "requesting clarification as to whether the $900,000 was intended to cover only the ship and that portion of the cargo insured in Britain." CIA Headquarters then advised Col. Castillo that the $900,000 was to cover both the ship and her cargo and was to be shared proportionately between the two groups of insurers.

In Guatemala City on 13 June 1955 the UK Embassy told the US Embassy that there had been a news leak about the negotiations between Castillo and the UK. According to the leak, US underwriters had submitted a $1.2 million claim to the Guatemalan Embassy in Washington DC and later raised it to $1.7 million, while UK underwriters had presented the Foreign Office with a claim for $1.3 million. Of that $1.3 million $280,000 was for the cargo, and it was indicated that the Foreign Office considered that part of the claim to be inflated.

The CIA's 1955 memorandum quotes someone, whose identity is erased from the published copy, as advising that "it was doubtful whether the matter could be settled for $900,000" and that A more realistic figure is stated to be $1,500,000 to $2,000,000." The relevant CIA station therefore recommended that Col. Castillo be authorized to increase his offer. CIA Headquarters replied that "additional funds would be made available if necessary but it was added that all possibilities be exhausted before authorizing Castillo to make a settlement".

In July 1957 Col. Castillo was assassinated by one of his own guards, and after a series of short-term successors General Miguel Ydígoras Fuentes became president of Guatemala. A memorandum dated 25 July 1958 from JC King, who was CIA Chief, Western Hemisphere Division states that the claimants' lawyer, Hafael Valls, visited Gen. Ydígoras, was initially well-received but subsequently was expelled from Guatemala. Valls accordingly proposed that the US Government take over leadership of the claim, and withhold any further aid or loans to Guatemala until the claim is settled.

King asserted that all representations for settlement had hitherto been made by British interests and that Gen. Ydígoras was very anti-British. King therefore recommended against the US pursuing the claim as Guatemala would regard this as the US acting on behalf of the UK rather than for itself. For this reason such an approach would be bound to fail and would only make the US unpopular with Gen. Ydígoras and many other Guatemalans. King also warned that Guatemala knew the aircraft that attacked Springfjord was not Guatemalan, and if US pressure to settle the claim provoked Guatemala that country might use its knowledge of the CIA's engineering of the 1954 coup to embarrass the USA. King concluded by stressing that US aid was to improve Guatemala's economy and its people's living standards "in order to eliminate the climate for the growth of Communism", and therefore the US could not risk giving the Springfjord claim precedence over aid to Guatemala.

Eighteen months after King's secret memo there was still no compensation payment, so on 10 February 1960 Marcus Lipton raised the question in the Commons again. The Conservative MP Robert Allan replied that the UK government had repeatedly asked the Guatemalan government to pay compensation for the sinking. Allan stated that "At one time the Guatemalan Government intimated that they would be prepared to pay some compensation, but the amount they offered was totally unacceptable to the claimants."

No compensation had been paid almost 13 years after the attack, so in 1967 Lipton submitted a written question asking the then Labour Government's Foreign Secretary "what steps he has taken to obtain compensation from the Guatemalan Government". On 12 June 1967 William Rodgers MP replied to the Commons that in 1963 Guatemala had suspended diplomatic relations with the UK and since then the UK government had been unable to continue to pursue the claim.

== See also ==
- Marcus Lipton § Parliamentary questions
- San Flaviano — a British oil tanker bombed and sunk by a CIA aircraft in Indonesia in 1958

== Sources and further reading ==
- CIA (1 July 1955), Subject: Bombing of British ship SS Springfjord (PDF), Memorandum for: Chief WH, Central Intelligence Agency, archived from the original (PDF) on 5 November 2010 The three-page memorandum is stamped: "CIA Historical Review Program, Release as Sanitized, 2003"
- King, J. C. (25 July 1958), Subject: S. S. Springfjord, Memorandum for: Office of the General Council, Central Intelligence Agency, archived from the original on 27 October 2012 The two-page memorandum is stamped: "CIA Historical Review Program, Release as Sanitized, 2003"
- Leeker, Dr. Joe F (23 August 2010), Air America Japan — since the days of CAT (PDF), University of Texas at Dallas, pp. 34–38, archived from the original (PDF) on 3 September 2012
- Villagrán, Francisco (1993). Biografía política de Guatemala. Guatemala: Facultad Latinoamericana de Ciencias Sociales (FLACSO). p. 151.
