= Glorious Victory =

Mural by Diego Rivera

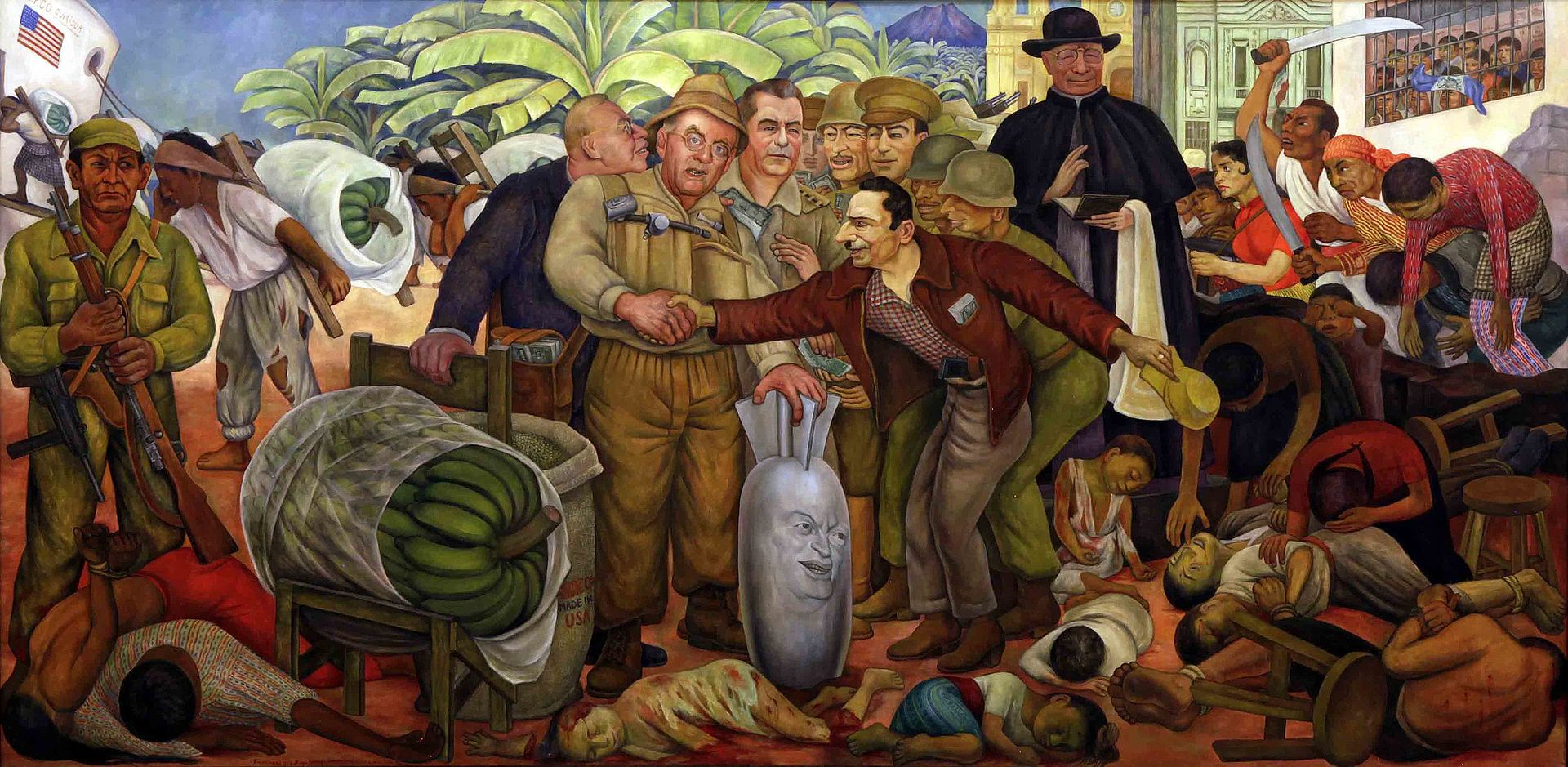
- Artist: Diego Rivera
- Year: 1954
- Medium: Tempera on canvas
- Dimensions: 260 cm × 450 cm (100 in × 180 in)
- Location: Pushkin Museum, Moscow

Glorious Victory (Spanish: La Gloriosa Victoria) is a tempera-on-canvas painting by Mexican artist Diego Rivera, created in 1954. The painting addresses the 1954 Guatemalan coup d'état that the Central Intelligence Agency (CIA) backed to overthrow the democratically elected Guatemalan president Jacobo Arbenz. It is held at the Pushkin Museum, in Moscow.

== Description ==
The painting depicts at the center, standing, CIA Director Allen Dulles striking a deal with Guatemala's newly installed right-wing president, Castillo Armas.

Dulles has his hand on a bomb that bears the face of the US president Dwight D. Eisenhower. Other American officials surround them, including John Foster Dulles, Allen's brother and Secretary of State at the time, and John Peurifoy, US ambassador to Guatemala. A Catholic priest, resembling archbishop Mariano Rossell y Arellano, blesses the meeting and looks pleased.

The group is wedged between an armed rebellion on the right and the hard labor of banana plantations on the left, guarded by a soldier. The painting represents three events that seem to happen impossibly at a single moment, collapsing years of violence and corruption into one massive event.

== Criticism ==
Rivera's explicit mention of the coup and references to prominent political figures prompted backlash to which he responded directly, defending his work as deserved criticism of current events. He completed the painting less than a year after the coup, suggesting that the painting anticipates the violence and destruction that supposedly would come to Guatemala based on broader experience of US-led interferences in Latin America. Rivera uses this piece to highlight the effects of Cold War violence on indigenous communities and to continue his career's protest of capitalism.

== Background ==
During Rivera's lifetime, Mexico was a country in a constant state of revolution. After a civil war at the turn of the century, people were hopeful for land reform and improved social services. Rivera depicted these wishes in his works alongside other themes of indigenous Mexican heritage and twentieth-century Marxism. His fame in Mexico began partly with his public murals, designed to teach illiterate and literate communities about their past and national history. Drawing from Mexico's collective memory as a mestizo nation of indigenous character, Rivera looked to the aesthetics of pre-Columbian societies so that his work in his view would be undeniably Mexican.

== Loss and resurfacing ==
The piece became a public mystery after its disappearance from known galleries or museums for fifty years. As rumors surfaced that the work was hidden in Russia, it was revealed that Rivera had loaned the piece to the Pushkin Museum, in Moscow, for a question of political solidarity. Rivera felt that the piece's criticism of capitalism and the US military intervention would be well received in Moscow. After the piece resurfaced, it was returned on loan to Mexico City, the home of many of the artist's most famous works. It was exhibited at Mexico's Museo Dolores Olmedo and in Guatemala City before being returned to Russia.

== Visual analysis ==
La Gloriosa Victoria shares the same aesthetic with Rivera's post-cubism work, inspired by Aztec and Maya artistic traditions. Rivera's use of tone and shape draws the attention to the gaggle in the center, full of peachy American faces. The American bodies are doughy forms dressed in khakis, standing against darker, lithe indigenous bodies, perhaps pointing to their gluttony in Central America. However, the Guatemalan military, those who decided to cooperate with the Americans, seem lighter in skin color. While this could be the artist's interpretation of the physical attributes of government officials, it could also represent the social whitening taking place: the racial mobility afforded to Guatemalan officials who did business with the white Americans. That these are Guatemalans using the situation to improve their personal lives, rather than those of their people, is furthered by the dress of the Guatemalan official in the center. While other Guatemalans are either depicted as soldiers in uniform or peasants, the man in the center wears a smooth leather jacket with a wad of cash in the pocket. In parallel, a pistol is tucked into the waistband of his khakis, which are clean despite the massacre unfolding at his feet. He has been bribed to make the deal and to follow through will require promoting violence with a straight face.

Rivera articulates the details of the bribe through the wads of dollar bills circulating around the hands in the center. Dollar bills are visible in the satchel of the Director of the CIA as he whispers into the ear of the US Secretary of State; they float between hands in the center and the viewer is unsure from where they originate or to whom they go; the circle ends as a wad of money poking out from the pocket of the Guatemalan president as he shakes hands with the American Secretary of State. That circle is repeated to the left in the laborious transport of bananas from farm to foreign market. In the foreground, the CIA director grips a chair that holds a massive bundle of bananas while an indigenous man uses a traditional head strap to carry bananas behind them towards a white ship bearing the American flag. He is barefoot wearing dirty white pants ripped with holes. Behind him, an androgynous figure carries the bananas into the ship. By representing the laborers as indistinguishable from each other, Rivera demonstrates one of capitalism's most salient points: that the alienable nature of labor from producers creates a blanket exchangeability of one worker to the other. Scholars have noted this as a common way for Rivera to demonstrate the effects of capitalism, distinguishing between the figures that “are” and those that are “doing”. Campesinos, or the indigenous proletariat, are displayed as doing through their production of labor, either in resistance to the coup or working on the plantations. The figures in the center contrast their movement by standing as a static representation of the land-owning elite. Capitalist production of bananas, managed by the US-based United Fruit Company and backed by the US-government, has made virtual slaves of Guatemala's indigenous farmers.

Surrounding the political deal are the effects of the coup: on the right, peasants with swords attempt to take back their lands while on the left, peasants labor to bring bananas to a white ship bearing the US flag. In the foreground lie the dead, bound, and dismembered bodies of Guatemalan children and workers. Many of the corpses have green-hued faces, perhaps suggesting the effects of disease on indigenous people, again recalling Spanish colonialism. While the bodies stretch across the lower third of the painting, the two sides are opposed in their structure. The right is a crowded frenzy, a wave of rebellion climbing out of what could be a prison and over their compatriots’ dead bodies towards the deal in the center. On the left, space is more open and shows Guatemalans bringing bananas to the boat using traditional head straps to support the bundles. Here, space is used ironically to juxtapose the supposed freedom of working in open fields with the slave-like conditions of US-owned banana plantations.

== Work with Rina Lazo ==
The upper right depicts a prison cell and is notable as it was painted not by Rivera, but by his Guatemalan assistant, Rina Lazo. In describing her time working on the piece, she noted how she had lived through the coup and that her experiences help shaped the events the work portrays. Here, she emphasizes political prisoners that stood against the coup who still wave the Guatemalan flag despite their confinement. Behind the prison, a Mexican flag waves in front of colonial buildings, suggesting a Latin America solidarity that forms to resist US colonialism.

== See also ==
- List of works by Diego Rivera
