= MS Alfhem =

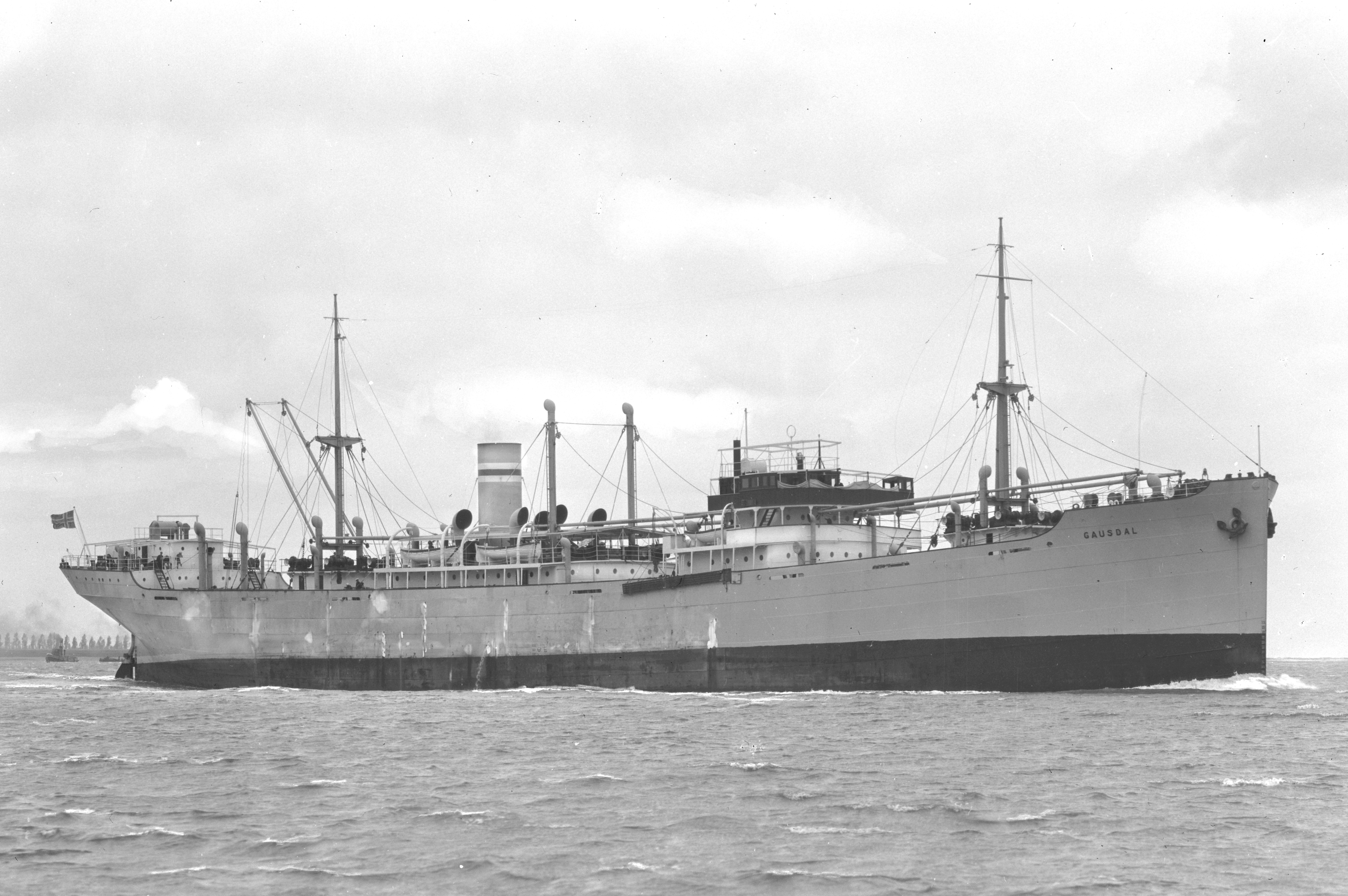
- As Gausdal on the river Scheldt

History
- Name: MS Guldborg (1930–33); MS Höegh Trader (1933–36); MS Gausdal (1936–53); MS Alfhem (1953–60); MS Antonos V (1960– )
- Namesake: Guldborg, Denmark (1930–33); Leif Høegh (1933–36); Gausdal, Norway (1936–53); Alvhem, Sweden (1953–60)
- Owner: D/S Dannebrog (1930–33); Skibs A/S "Gausdal" (1936–53); Ångbåts Ab Bohusländska kusten (1953–60)
- Operator: C.K. Hansen (1930–33); Leif Höegh & Co (1933–36); Bos & Pedersen (1936–53); Ångbåts AB Bohusländska kusten (1953–60)
- Port of registry: (Denmark) Copenhagen (1930–33); (Norway) Oslo (1933–36); (Denmark) Odense (1936–53); (Sweden) Uddevalla (1953–60)
- Builder: Odense Staalskibsværft A/S, Odense, Denmark
- Yard number: 36
- Laid down: 29 June 1929
- Launched: 2 November 1929
- Completed: 25 February 1930
- Identification: Code Letters NHPG; (1930–33); Code Letters LISZ; (1936–53)
- Fate: Scrapped 22 February 1961

General characteristics
- Type: Cargo ship
- Tonnage: 4,795 GRT; 2,871 NRT; 8,460 DWT
- Length: 386.3 ft (117.7 m)
- Beam: 54.3 ft (16.6 m)
- Draught: 25.7 ft (7.8 m)
- Installed power: Two 6-cylinder Burmeister & Wain diesel engines; 543 NHP
- Propulsion: twin screws

MS Alfhem was a Scandinavian cargo ship that was built in 1930 and traded for more than 30 years. In her career she passed through five successive owners, managers and names. Alfhem is her fourth name and the one by which she is most widely known.

In 1954 the CIA was engineering a coup d'état in Guatemala to replace the elected civilian government of President Jacobo Arbenz with a military dictator, Colonel Carlos Castillo. Since 1951 the US had withheld arms supplies to the Guatemalan government, and in 1953 the US blocked Guatemalan government attempts to buy arms from Canada, Germany and Rhodesia.

In the spring of 1954 Guatemala bought 2,000 tons of arms and ammunition from the Czechoslovak Socialist Republic and used Alfhem to ship them to Puerto Barrios, Guatemala. The US regarded Alfhem's success in evading US sea and air patrols to deliver the munitions as a setback. However, it did not prevent the CIA from executing Operation PBSuccess against Guatemala.

== Owners and names ==
The ship was launched as Guldborg by the Odense Staalskibsværft A/S in Odense, Denmark for Dampskibsselsk Dannebrog of Copenhagen and completed in February 1930. In 1933 she was sold to Norwegian owners who renamed her Höegh Trader and placed her under the management of Leif Höegh & Co. In 1936 she was sold again, this time to Skibs A/S "Gausdal" of Odense who renamed her Gausdal. In 1953 she was sold to a Swedish company, Ångbåts AB Bohusländska kusten, who named her Alfhem and registered her in Uddevalla. In 1960 she was sold again to new owners, who renamed her Antonos V.

== Arms to Guatemala ==
In Spring 1954 Alfhem loaded her Czech weapons cargo in the Baltic port of Szczecin in Poland. She then took a zig-zag course first towards Dakar in French West Africa (now Senegal), then across the Atlantic towards Curaçao in the Dutch West Indies, later re-directed to Puerto Cortés, Honduras. Finally a radio message to her Master revealed her true destination to be Puerto Barrios in Guatemala. She docked at Puerto Barrios, 185 miles (298 km) northeast of Guatemala City, on 15 May 1954.

In an attempt to conceal her use for the arms shipment to Guatemala, the Czechoslovak government had paid for a "straw charter" of the vessel via a British firm, E.E. Dean, of London. According to a US State Department document, Dean served "as a dummy in the transaction, holding a 'straw charter' in order to justify transfer of Czech sterling funds to Sweden." According to both the UK and the US Embassy in London, Dean did not hold control over the charter, but rather an "agent for Czekofracht, the state transport monopoly". Another deception was the falsification of the ship's bill of lading which declared that the cargo was composed entirely of items such as shovels, nails, machine tools, laboratory glass, etc., rather than the estimated 2,000 tons of weaponry and munitions that were its principal components.

Alfhem delivered 2,000 tons of arms and ammunition, more than all Central America had received in the previous 30 years. According to the 1954 Time magazine account, the weapons allegedly worth $10 million, were thought to be from Czechoslovakia's famous Škoda munitions works and were believed to be primarily rifles, automatic arms, mortars and light artillery. Described in the ship's manifest as "steel rods, optical glass and laboratory supplies", the weapons were packed in 15,000 cases. Under the supervision of the country's Defense Minister, the weapons were unloaded from Alfhem and loaded onto freight cars on the-US controlled International Railways of Central America (IRCA) for shipment to the capital 197 miles (317 km) away. Protected by armed guards, the weapons made their way to their destination.

== Rebel and US reaction ==
Anti-government rebels tried to stop the arms shipment by dynamiting a railway trestle just as the munitions train crossed. However, a downpour of rain drenched the fuses and the dynamite did not detonate as planned. A gun battle followed in which one government soldier and one rebel were killed.

The CIA's chief of clandestine operations, Frank Wisner, was annoyed that the U.S. Navy failed to intercept Alfhem – that is, "until he realized that the shipment of... weaponry was just the excuse the United States needed to intervene."

The US Joint Chiefs of Staff held an emergency session to discuss whether or not to deploy US troops to Honduras to assist if the country were attacked by Guatemala. The 21 May 1954 minutes from the Pentagon meeting illustrate how the then US Army chief of staff, Gen. Matthew Ridgway opposed this plan and recommended instead that Nicaraguan Gen. Anastasio Somoza García's national guard be sent to Guatemala. One state department official objected, noting that Somoza had told US diplomats that his own armed forces were simply an internal police force and therefore "incompetent." to carry out an armed intervention in another country.

On 24 May the US Navy's Caribbean Sea Frontier launched Operation HARDROCK BAKER: air and sea patrols in the Gulf of Honduras, ostensibly "to protect Honduras from invasion and to control arms shipments to Guatemala." The US "began airlifting arms to Nicaragua and Honduras, to restore the balance of power." By 3 June, the US had airlifted weapons to Honduras. By 18 June, the US called for a complete arms embargo against Guatemala.

US fear of further arms shipments to Guatemala remained high, and to disastrous effect. On the morning of 27 June 1954 a CIA-operated P-38M Lightning flying over Puerto San José destroyed the British cargo ship SS Springfjord with napalm bombs, because the CIA officer in local command of the insurgent "Liberation Air Force" believed she was unloading weapons. In fact Springfjord was loading cotton and coffee for the US shipping company Grace Line. The CIA mistake led to a three-way compensation dispute between the UK, Guatemala and the US that was still unresolved in 1967.

== Sources ==
- Villagrán, Francisco (1993). Biografía política de Guatemala. Guatemala: Facultad Latinoamericana de Ciencias Sociales (FLACSO). pp. 131, 151.
