= 1954 Guatemalan coup d'état =

CIA-backed deposition of Jacobo Árbenz

- Part of the Guatemalan Revolution and the Cold War
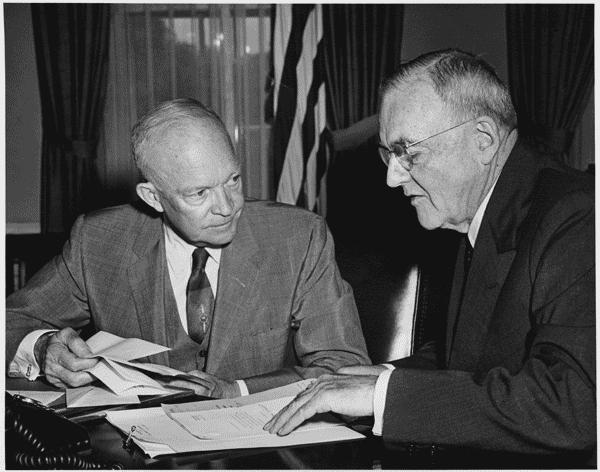
- U.S. President Dwight D. Eisenhower (left) with U.S. Secretary of State John Foster Dulles, the advocate of the coup d'état, in 1956
Date	18–27 June 1954
Location	Guatemala
Result	Rebel–U.S. government victory: Initial Guatemalan government military success; Jacobo Árbenz overthrown; Guatemalan Revolution ended; Military junta assumes power

Belligerents
Guatemalan government: Guatemalan military loyalists	Guatemalan Army of Liberation exiles: Guatemalan military (elements); Supported by: United States: CIA

Commanders and leaders
Jacobo Árbenz; Carlos Enrique Díaz	Carlos Castillo Armas; Carlos Enrique Díaz (United States) Dwight D. Eisenhower (United States) Allen Dulles

Strength
5,000 soldiers; 2,500 civil guards	480 rebels; several aircraft

Casualties and losses
2+ killed; 1+ captured; 1 cargo ship destroyed	113 killed or captured; 60 arrested (in El Salvador); several aircraft shot down

The democratically elected Guatemalan president Jacobo Árbenz was deposed in a coup d'état in 1954, marking the end of the Guatemalan Revolution. The coup installed the military dictatorship of Carlos Castillo Armas, the first in a series of U.S.-backed authoritarian rulers in Guatemala. The coup was precipitated by a CIA covert operation code-named PBSuccess.

The Guatemalan Revolution began in 1944, after a popular uprising toppled the military dictatorship of Jorge Ubico. Juan José Arévalo was elected president in Guatemala's first democratic election. He introduced a minimum wage and near-universal suffrage. Arévalo was succeeded in 1951 by Árbenz, who instituted land reforms which granted property to landless peasants. The Guatemalan Revolution was an unwelcome development for the U.S. government, which was predisposed during the Cold War to see it as communist. This perception grew after Árbenz had been elected and formally legalized the communist Guatemalan Party of Labour. The U.S. government feared that Guatemala's example could inspire nationalists wanting social reform throughout Latin America. The United Fruit Company (UFC), whose highly profitable business had been affected by the softening of exploitative labor practices in Guatemala, engaged in an influential lobbying campaign to persuade the U.S. to overthrow the Guatemalan government. U.S. president Harry S. Truman authorized Operation PBFortune to topple Árbenz in 1952, which was a precursor to PBSuccess.

Dwight D. Eisenhower was elected U.S. president in 1952, promising to take a harder line against communism, and his staff members John Foster Dulles and Allen Dulles had significant links to the United Fruit Company. The U.S. federal government drew exaggerated conclusions about the extent of communist influence among Árbenz's advisers, and Eisenhower authorized the CIA to carry out Operation PBSuccess in August 1953. The CIA armed, funded, and trained a force of 480 men led by Carlos Castillo Armas. After U.S. efforts to criticize and isolate Guatemala internationally, Armas' force invaded Guatemala on 18 June 1954, backed by a heavy campaign of psychological warfare, as well as air bombings of Guatemala City and a naval blockade.

The invasion force fared poorly militarily, and most of its offensives were defeated. However, psychological warfare and the fear of a U.S. invasion intimidated the Guatemalan Army, which eventually refused to fight. Árbenz unsuccessfully attempted to arm civilians to resist the invasion, before resigning on 27 June. Castillo Armas became president ten days later, following negotiations in San Salvador. Described as the definitive deathblow to democracy in Guatemala, the coup was widely criticized internationally, and strengthened the long-lasting anti-U.S. sentiment in Latin America. Attempting to justify the coup, the CIA launched Operation PBHistory, which sought evidence of Soviet influence in Guatemala among documents from the Árbenz era, but found none. Castillo Armas quickly assumed dictatorial powers, banning opposition parties, executing, imprisoning and torturing political opponents, and reversing the social reforms of the revolution. In the first few months after the coup, Castillo Armas' government executed many supporters of Árbenz, with estimates ranging from hundreds to five thousand. Political assassinations of enemies of the new regime had been planned by the CIA prior to the coup. Castillo Armas was assassinated by a member of his presidential guard in 1957. Beginning in 1960, a civil war erupted, lasting until 1996, as leftist guerrillas fought a series of U.S.-backed authoritarian regimes responsible for numerous atrocities, including a genocide of Maya peoples.

== Historical background ==
=== Monroe Doctrine ===
The Monroe Doctrine stated that the Western Hemisphere, including the Republic of Guatemala, was within the U.S. sphere of influence.

U.S. president James Monroe's foreign policy doctrine of 1823 warned the European powers against further colonization in Latin America. The stated aim of the Monroe Doctrine was to maintain order and stability, and to ensure that U.S. access to resources and markets was not limited. Historian Mark Gilderhus states that the doctrine also contained racially condescending language, which likened Latin American countries to squabbling children. While the U.S. did not initially have the power to enforce the doctrine, during the 19th century many European powers withdrew from Latin America, allowing the U.S. to expand its sphere of influence. In 1895, President Grover Cleveland laid out a more militant version of the doctrine, stating that the U.S. was "practically sovereign" on the continent.

Following the Spanish–American War in 1898, this aggressive interpretation was used to create a U.S. economic empire across the Caribbean, such as with the 1903 treaty with Cuba that was heavily tilted in the U.S.' favor. U.S. president Theodore Roosevelt believed that the U.S. should be the main beneficiary of production in Central America. The U.S. enforced this hegemony with armed interventions in Nicaragua (1912–33), and Haiti (1915–34). The U.S. did not need to use its military might in Guatemala, where a series of dictators were willing to accommodate the economic interests of the U.S. in return for its support for their regimes. Guatemala was among the Central American countries of the period known as a banana republic. From 1890 to 1920, control of Guatemala's resources and its economy shifted away from Britain and Germany to the U.S., which became Guatemala's dominant trade partner. The Monroe Doctrine continued to be seen as relevant to Guatemala, and was used to justify the coup in 1954.

=== Authoritarian governments and the United Fruit Company ===
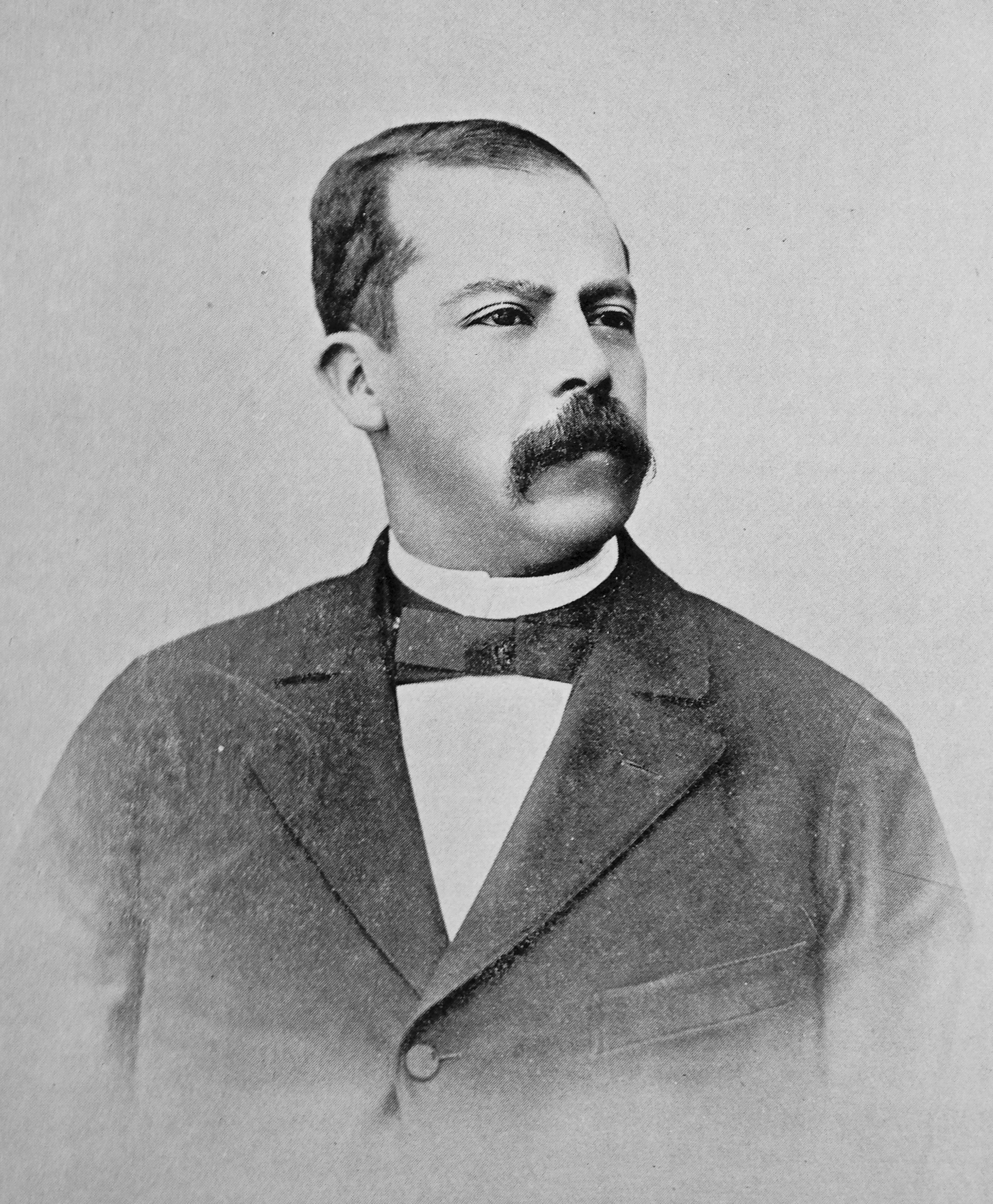
Manuel Estrada Cabrera, President of Guatemala from 1898 to 1920, granted several concessions to the United Fruit Company.

Following a surge in global coffee demand in the late 19th century, the Guatemalan government made several concessions to plantation owners. It passed legislation that dispossessed the communal landholdings of the Indigenous population and allowed coffee growers to purchase it. Manuel Estrada Cabrera, President of Guatemala from 1898 to 1920, was one of several rulers who made large concessions to foreign companies, including the United Fruit Company (UFC). Formed in 1899 by the merger of two large U.S. corporations, the new entity owned large tracts of land across Central America, and in Guatemala controlled the railroads, the docks, and the communication systems. By 1900 it had become the largest exporter of bananas in the world, and had a monopoly over the Guatemalan banana trade. Journalist and writer William Blum describes UFC's role in Guatemala as a "state within a state". The U.S. government was closely involved with the Guatemalan state under Cabrera, frequently dictating financial policies and ensuring that American companies were granted several exclusive rights. When Cabrera was overthrown in 1920, the U.S. sent an armed force to make certain that the new president remained friendly to it.

Fearing a popular revolt following the unrest created by the Great Depression, wealthy Guatemalan landowners lent their support to Jorge Ubico, who won an uncontested election in 1931. Ubico's regime became one of the most repressive in the region. He abolished debt peonage, replacing it with a vagrancy law which stipulated that all landless men of working age needed to perform a minimum of 100 days of forced labor annually. He authorized landowners to take any actions they wished against their workers, including executions. Ubico was an admirer of European fascist leaders such as Benito Mussolini and Adolf Hitler, but had to ally with the U.S. for geopolitical reasons, and received substantial support from that country throughout his reign. A staunch anti-communist, Ubico reacted to several peasant rebellions with incarcerations and massacres.

By 1930 the UFC had built an operating capital of 215 million U.S. dollars, (Note: equivalent to $4,144,000,000 in 2025) and had been the largest landowner and employer in Guatemala for several years. Ubico granted it a new contract, which was immensely favorable to the company. This included 200,000 hectares (490,000 acres) of public land, an exemption from taxes, and a guarantee that no other company would receive any competing contract. Ubico requested the UFC cap the daily salary of its workers at 50 U.S. cents, so that workers in other companies would be less able to demand higher wages.

=== Guatemalan Revolution and presidency of Arévalo ===
The repressive policies of the Ubico government resulted in a popular uprising led by university students and middle-class citizens in 1944. Ubico fled, handing over power to a three-person junta which continued Ubico's policies until it was toppled by the October Revolution that aimed to transform Guatemala into a liberal democracy. The largely free election that followed installed a philosophically conservative university professor, Juan José Arévalo, as the President of Guatemala. Arévalo's administration drafted a more liberal labor code, built health centers, and increased funding to education. Arévalo enacted a minimum wage, and created state-run farms to employ landless laborers. He cracked down on the communist Guatemalan Party of Labour (Partido Guatemalteco del Trabajo, PGT) and in 1945 criminalized labor unions in workplaces with fewer than 500 workers. By 1947, the remaining unions had grown strong enough to pressure him into drafting a new labor code, which made workplace discrimination illegal and created health and safety standards. However, Arévalo refused to advocate land reform of any kind, and stopped short of drastically changing labor relations in the countryside.

Despite Arévalo's anti-communism, the U.S. was suspicious of him, and worried that he was under Soviet influence. The communist movement did grow stronger during Arévalo's presidency, partly because he released its imprisoned leaders, and also through the strength of its teachers' union. However, the communists were still oppressed by the state, as they were harassed by Arévalo's police at any opportunity.Another cause for U.S. worry was Arévalo's support of the Caribbean Legion. The Legion was a group of progressive exiles and revolutionaries, whose members included Fidel Castro, that aimed to overthrow U.S.-backed dictatorships across Central America. The government also faced opposition from within the country; Arévalo survived at least 25 coup attempts. A notable example was an attempt in 1949 led by Francisco Arana, which was foiled in an armed shootout between Arana's supporters and a force led by Arévalo's defense minister Jacobo Árbenz. Arana was among those killed, but details of the coup attempt were never made public. Other sources of opposition to Arévalo's government were the right-wing politicians and conservatives within the military who had grown powerful during Ubico's dictatorship, as well as the clergy of the Catholic Church.

=== Presidency of Árbenz and land reform ===
The largely free 1950 elections were won by the popular Árbenz, and represented the first transfer of power between democratically elected leaders in Guatemala. Árbenz had personal ties to some members of the communist PGT, which was legalized during his government, and a couple of members played a role in drafting the new president's policies. Nonetheless, Árbenz did not try to turn Guatemala into a communist state, instead choosing a moderate capitalist approach. The PGT too committed itself to working within the existing legal framework to achieve its immediate objectives of emancipating peasants from feudalism and improving workers' rights. The most prominent component of Árbenz's policy was his agrarian reform bill. Árbenz drafted the bill himself, having sought advice from economists across Latin America. The focus of the law was on transferring uncultivated land from large landowners to poor laborers, who would then be able to begin viable farms of their own.

The official title of the agrarian reform bill was Decree 900. It expropriated all uncultivated land from landholdings that were larger than 673 acres (272 ha). If the estates were between 224 acres (91 ha) and 672 acres (272 ha), uncultivated land was to be expropriated only if less than two-thirds of it was in use. The owners were compensated with government bonds, the value of which was equal to that of the land expropriated. The value of the land itself was what the owners had declared it to be in their tax returns in 1952. Of the nearly 350,000 private landholdings, only 1,710 were affected by expropriation. The law was implemented with great speed, which resulted in some arbitrary land seizures. There was violence directed at landowners.

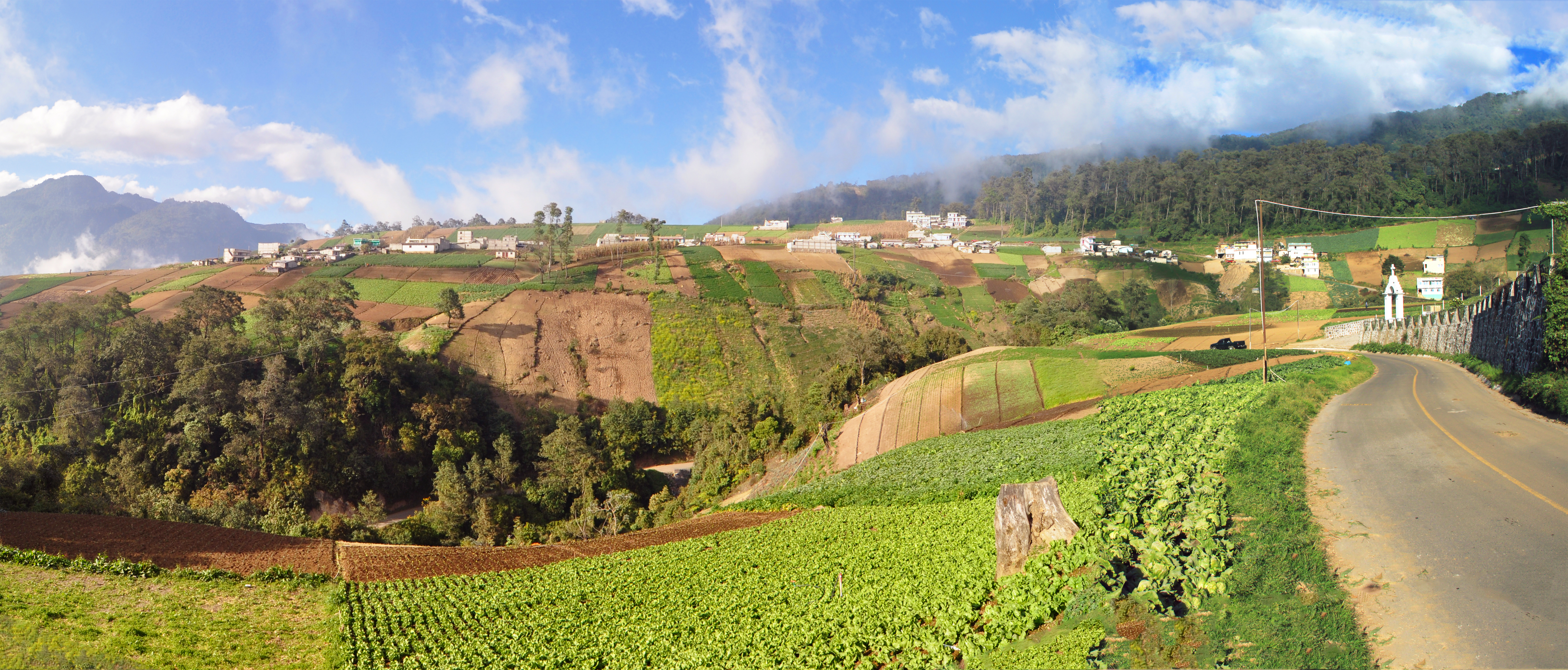
Farmland in the Quetzaltenango Department, in western Guatemala

By June 1954, 1,400,000 acres (570,000 ha) of land had been expropriated and distributed. Approximately 500,000 individuals, or one-sixth of the population, had received land by this point. Contrary to the predictions made by detractors, the law resulted in a slight increase in Guatemalan agricultural productivity, cultivated area, and purchases of farm machinery. Overall, the law resulted in a significant improvement in living standards for thousands of peasant families, the majority of whom were Indigenous. Historian Greg Grandin sees the law as representing a fundamental power shift in favor of the hitherto marginalized.

== Genesis and prelude ==
=== United Fruit Company lobbying ===
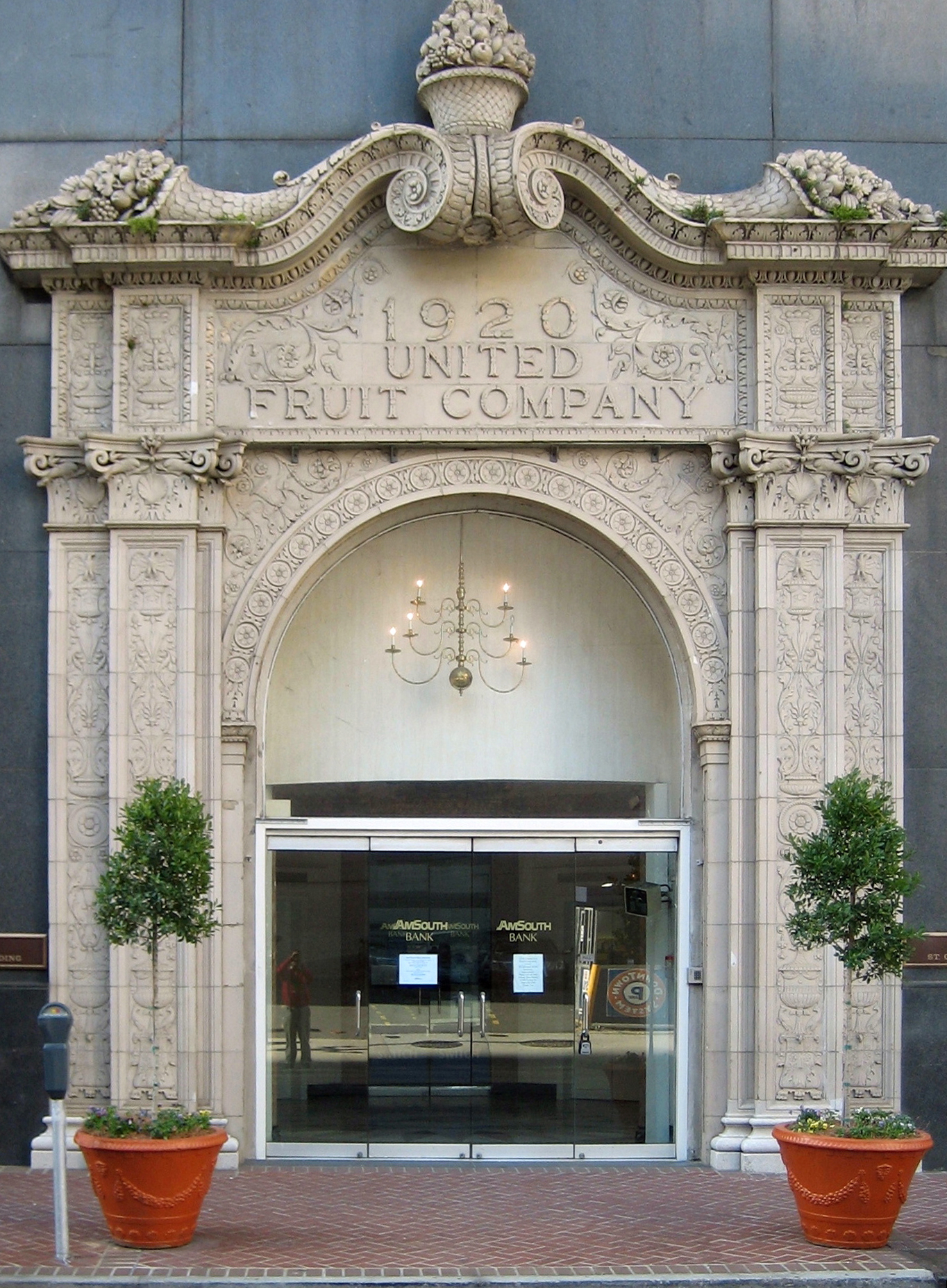
The former headquarters of the United Fruit Company, in New Orleans. The company played a key role in instigating the 1954 coup d'état.

By 1950, the United Fruit Company's (now Chiquita) annual profits were 65 million U.S. dollars, (Note: equivalent to $870,000,000 in 2025) twice as large as the revenue of the government of Guatemala. The company was the largest landowner in Guatemala, and virtually owned Puerto Barrios, Guatemala's only port to the Atlantic, allowing it to profit from the flow of goods through the port. Because of its long association with Ubico's government, Guatemalan revolutionaries saw the UFC as an impediment to progress after 1944. This image was reinforced by the company's discriminatory policies against the native population. Owing to its size, the reforms of Arévalo's government affected the UFC more than other companies. Among other things, the new labor code allowed UFC workers to strike when their demands for higher wages and job security were not met. The company saw itself as being targeted by the reforms, and refused to negotiate with strikers, despite frequently being in violation of the new laws. The company's troubles were compounded with the passage of Decree 900 in 1952. Of the 550,000 acres (220,000 ha) that the company owned, only 15 percent was being cultivated; the rest was idle, and thus came under the scope of the agrarian reform law.

The UFC responded by intensively lobbying the U.S. government. Several Congressmen criticized the Guatemalan government for not protecting the interests of the company. The Guatemalan government replied that the company was the main obstacle to progress in the country. American historians observed that "[to] the Guatemalans it appeared that their country was being mercilessly exploited by foreign interests which took huge profits without making any contributions to the nation's welfare". In 1953, 200,000 acres (81,000 ha) of uncultivated land was expropriated by the government, which paid 2.99 U.S. dollars per acre (7.39 U.S. dollars per hectare), (Note: equivalent to $88.93 in 2025) twice what the company had paid when it bought the property. More expropriation occurred soon after, bringing the total to over 400,000 acres (160,000 ha), at the rate which UFC had valued its property for tax purposes. The company was unhappy with losing the land, and the level of profit resulting from the sale, resulting in further lobbying in Washington, particularly through U.S. Secretary of State John Foster Dulles, who had close ties to the company.

The UFC also began a public relations campaign to discredit the Guatemalan government, hiring Edward Bernays, who mounted a concerted misinformation campaign for several years which portrayed the company as the victim of a "communist" Guatemalan government. The company stepped up its efforts after Dwight Eisenhower was elected U.S. president in 1952. These included commissioning a research study from a firm known to be hostile to social reform, which produced a 235-page report that was highly critical of the Guatemalan government. Historians have stated that the report was full of "exaggerations, scurrilous descriptions and bizarre historical theories" but it nonetheless had a significant impact on the members of Congress who read it. Overall, the company spent over half a million dollars to convince lawmakers and the American public that the Guatemalan government needed to be overthrown.

=== Operation PBFortune ===
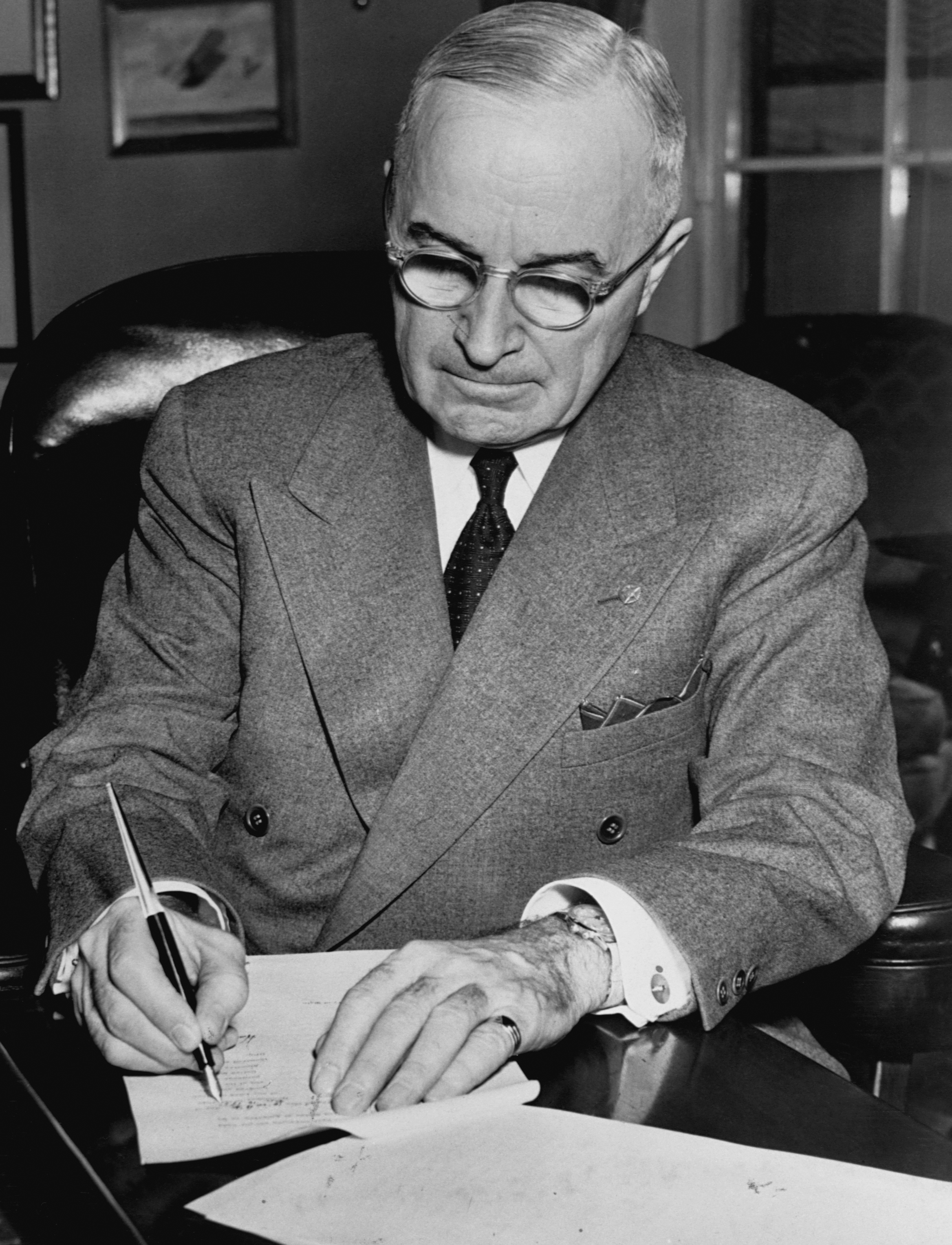
U.S. President Harry Truman (pictured here in 1950) authorized the CIA to effect a Guatemalan coup d'état in 1952.

As the Cold War developed and the Guatemalan government clashed with U.S. corporations on an increasing number of issues, the U.S. government grew increasingly suspicious of the Guatemalan Revolution. In addition, the Cold War predisposed the Truman administration to see the Guatemalan government as communist. Arévalo's support for the Caribbean Legion also worried the Truman administration, which saw it as a vehicle for communism, rather than as the anti-dictatorial force it was conceived as. Until the end of its term, the Truman administration had relied on purely diplomatic and economic means to try to reduce the perceived communist influence. The U.S. had refused to sell arms to the Guatemalan government after 1944; in 1951 it began to block all weapons purchases by Guatemala.

The U.S.'s worries over communist influence increased after the election of Árbenz in 1951 and his enactment of Decree 900 in 1952. In April 1952 Anastasio Somoza García, the dictator of Nicaragua, made his first state visit to the U.S. He made several public speeches praising the U.S., and was awarded a medal by the New York City government. During a meeting with Truman and his senior staff, Somoza said that if the U.S. gave him the arms, he would "clean up Guatemala". The proposal did not receive much immediate support, but Truman instructed the Central Intelligence Agency (CIA) to follow up on it.

The CIA contacted Carlos Castillo Armas, a Guatemalan army officer who had been exiled from the country in 1949 following a failed coup attempt against President Arévalo. Believing that he would lead a coup with or without their assistance, the CIA decided to supply him with weapons and 225,000 U.S. dollars. (Note: equivalent to $3,040,000 in 2025) The CIA considered Castillo Armas sufficiently corrupt and authoritarian to be well suited to lead the coup.

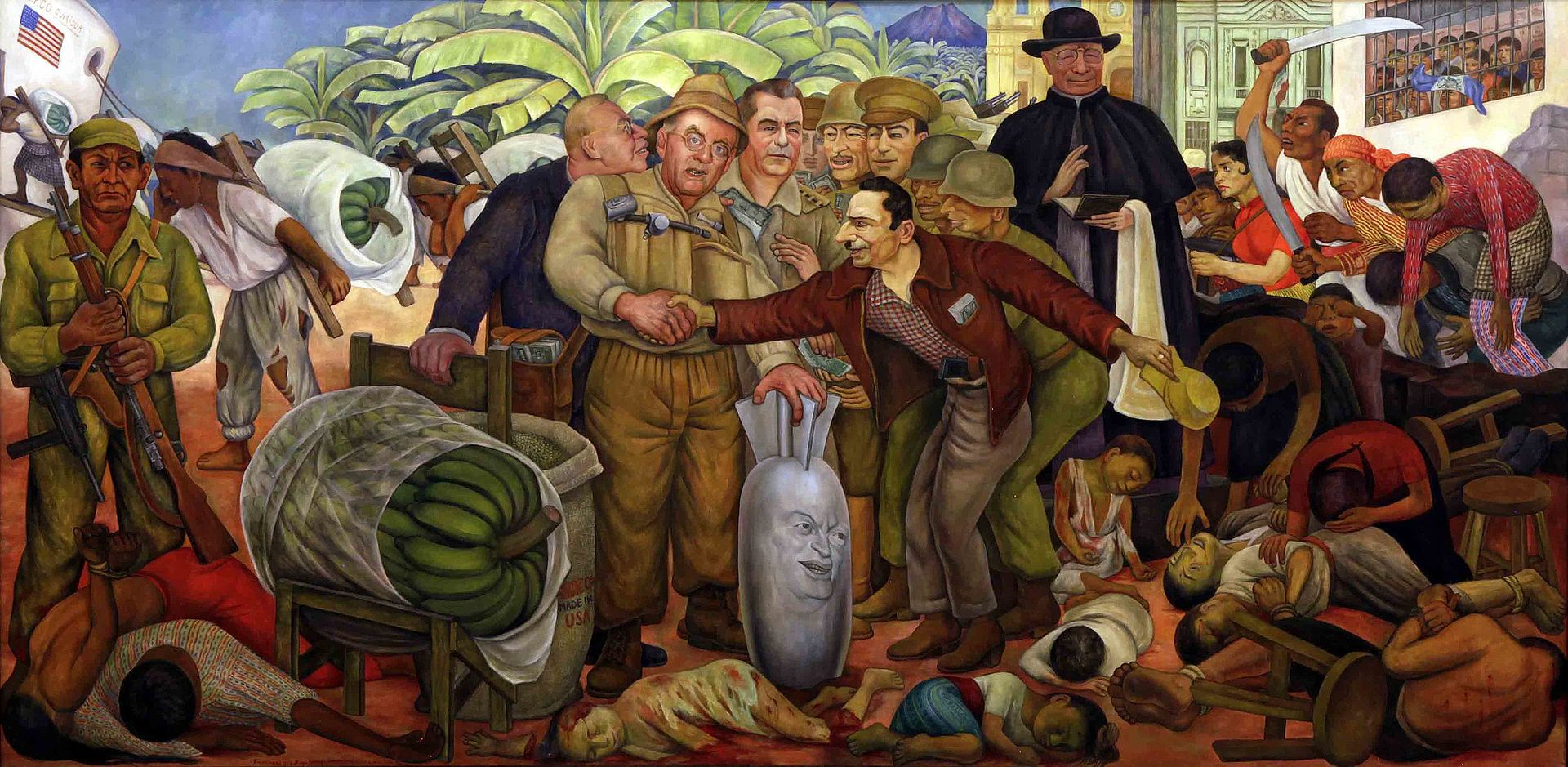
Gloriosa victoria, mural by Diego Rivera which satirizes the role of the US, UFC, Catholic Church and the military in the Guatemalan coup. The individuals giving the handshake are John Foster Dulles and general Castillo Armas.

The coup was planned in detail over the next few weeks by the CIA, the UFC, and Somoza. The CIA also contacted Marcos Pérez Jiménez of Venezuela and Rafael Trujillo of the Dominican Republic; the two U.S.-backed dictators were supportive of the plan, and agreed to contribute some funding. Although PBFortune was officially approved on 9 September 1952, various planning steps had been taken earlier in the year. In January 1952, officers in the CIA's Directorate of Plans compiled a list of "top flight Communists whom the new government would desire to eliminate immediately in the event of a successful anti-Communist coup". The CIA plan called for the assassination of over 58 Guatemalans, as well as the arrest of many others.

The CIA put the plan into motion in late 1952. A freighter that had been borrowed from the UFC was specially refitted in New Orleans and loaded with weapons under the guise of agricultural machinery, and set sail for Nicaragua. However, the plan was terminated soon after: accounts of its termination vary. Some sources state that the State Department discovered the plan when a senior official was asked to sign a certain document, while others suggest that Somoza was indiscreet. The eventual outcome was that Secretary of State Dean Acheson called off the operation. The CIA continued to support Castillo Armas; it paid him a monthly retainer of 3000 U.S. dollars, (Note: equivalent to $36,000 in 2025) and gave him the resources to maintain his rebel force.

=== Eisenhower administration ===
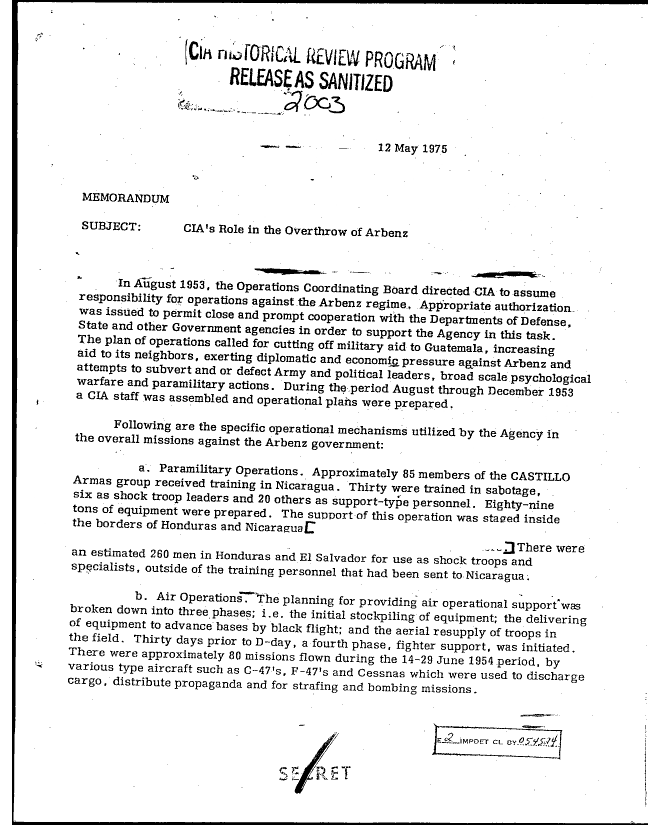
The memorandum which describes the CIA's organisation of the paramilitary deposition of President Jacobo Árbenz in June 1954

During his successful campaign for the U.S. presidency, Dwight Eisenhower pledged to pursue a more proactive anti-communist policy, promising to roll back communism, rather than contain it. Working in an atmosphere of increasing McCarthyism in government circles, Eisenhower was more willing than Truman to use the CIA to depose governments the U.S. disliked. Although PBFortune had been quickly aborted, tension between the U.S. and Guatemala continued to rise, especially with the legalization of the communist PGT, and its inclusion in the government coalition for the elections of January 1953. Articles published in the U.S. press often reflected this predisposition to see communist influence; for example, a New York Times article about the visit to Guatemala by Chilean poet Pablo Neruda highlighted his communist beliefs, but neglected to mention his reputation as the greatest living poet in Latin America.

Several figures in Eisenhower's administration, including Secretary of State John Foster Dulles and his brother CIA Director Allen Dulles, had close ties to the United Fruit Company. The Dulles brothers had been partners of the law firm of Sullivan & Cromwell, and in that capacity had arranged several deals for the UFC. Undersecretary of State Walter Bedell Smith would later become a director of the company, while Eisenhower's personal assistant Ann C. Whitman was the wife of UFC public relations director Edmund S. Whitman. These personal connections meant that the Eisenhower administration tended to conflate the interests of the UFC with that of U.S. national security interests, and made it more willing to overthrow the Guatemalan government. The success of the 1953 CIA operation to overthrow the democratically elected Prime Minister of Iran also strengthened Eisenhower's belief in using the agency to effect political change overseas.

Historians and authors writing about the 1954 coup have debated the relative importance of the role of the United Fruit Company and the worries about communist influence (whether or not these were grounded in reality) in the U.S.'s decision to instigate the coup in 1954. Several historians have maintained that the lobbying of the UFC, and the expropriation of its lands, were the chief motivation for the U.S., strengthened by the financial ties of individuals within the Eisenhower administration to the UFC. Others have argued that the overthrow was motivated primarily by U.S. strategic interest; the knowledge of the presence of a small number of communists close to Árbenz led the U.S. to reach incorrect conclusions about the extent of communist influence. Yet others have argued that the overthrow was part of a larger tendency within the U.S. to oppose nationalist movements in the Third World. Some assert that Washington didn't believe Guatemala to be an immediate communist threat, citing declassified documents from the U.S. Policy Planning Staff, which state the real risk was the example of independence of the U.S. that Guatemala might offer to nationalists wanting social reform throughout Latin America. Both the role of the UFC and that of the perception of communist influence continue to be cited as motivations for the U.S.'s actions today.

== Operation PBSuccess ==
=== Planning ===
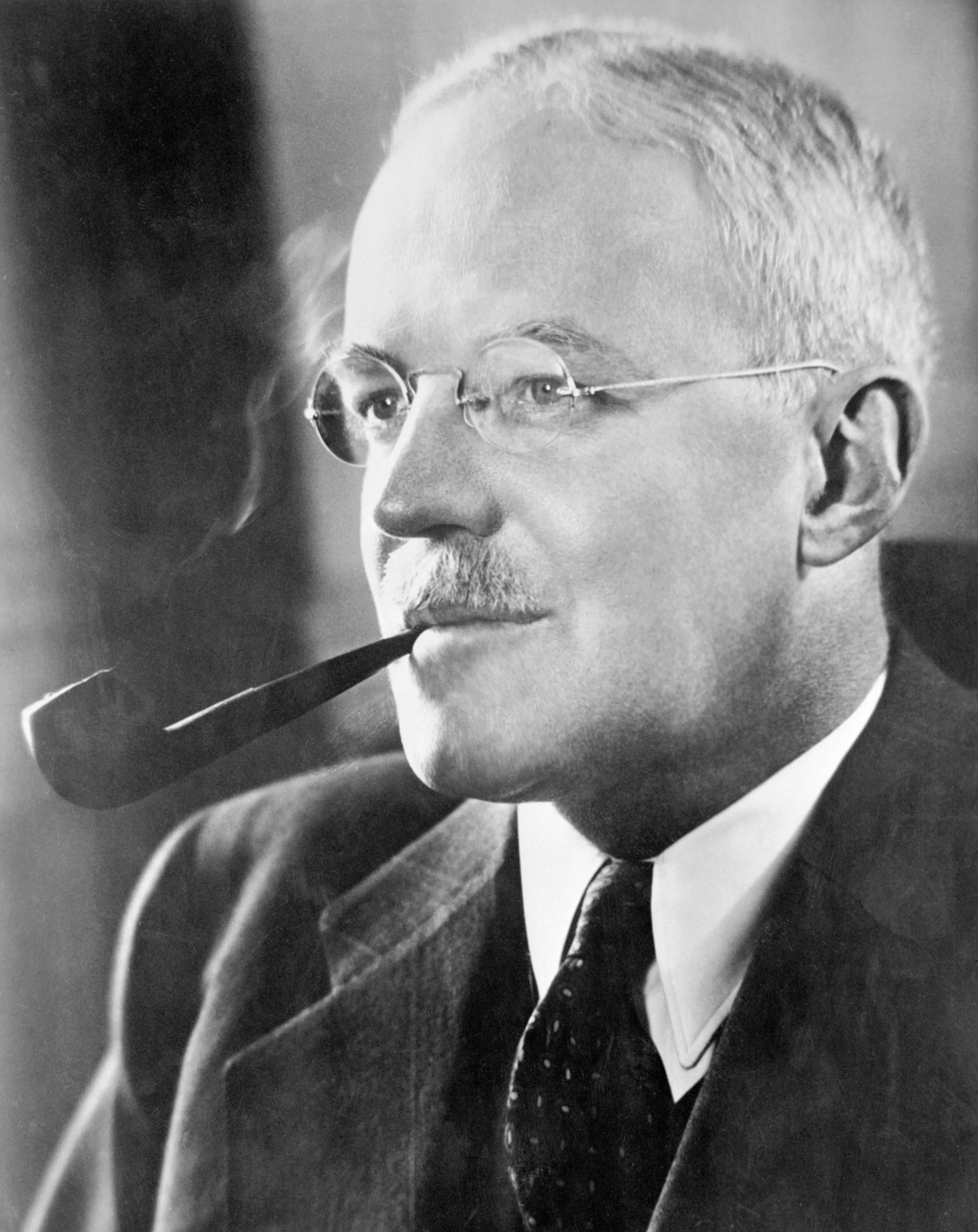
Allen Dulles, director of the CIA during the 1954 coup, and brother of U.S. secretary of state John Foster Dulles

Eisenhower authorized the CIA operation to overthrow Jacobo Árbenz, code-named Operation PBSuccess, in August 1953. The operation was granted a budget of 2.7 million U.S. dollars (Note: equivalent to $32,400,000 in 2025) for "psychological warfare and political action". The total budget has been estimated at between 5 and 7 million dollars, and the planning employed over 100 CIA agents. In addition, the operation recruited scores of individuals from among Guatemalan exiles and the populations of the surrounding countries. The plans included drawing up lists of people within Árbenz's government to be assassinated if the coup were to be carried out. Manuals of assassination techniques were compiled, and lists were also made of people whom the junta would dispose of. These were the CIA's first known assassination manuals, and were reused in subsequent CIA actions.

The State Department created a team of diplomats who would support PBSuccess. It was led by John Peurifoy, who took over as Ambassador to Guatemala in October 1953. Another member of the team was William D. Pawley, a wealthy businessman and diplomat with extensive knowledge of the aviation industry. Peurifoy was a militant anti-communist, and had proven his willingness to work with the CIA during his time as United States Ambassador to Greece. Under Peurifoy's tenure, relations with the Guatemalan government soured further, although those with the Guatemalan military improved. In a report to John Dulles, Peurifoy stated that he was "definitely convinced that if [Árbenz] is not a communist, then he will certainly do until one comes along". Within the CIA, the operation was headed by Deputy Director of Plans Frank Wisner. The field commander selected by Wisner was former U.S. Army Colonel Albert Haney, then chief of the CIA station in South Korea. Haney reported directly to Wisner, thereby separating PBSuccess from the CIA's Latin American division, a decision which created some tension within the agency. Haney decided to establish headquarters in a concealed office complex in Opa-locka, Florida. Codenamed "Lincoln", it became the nerve center of Operation PBSuccess.

The CIA operation was complicated by a premature coup on 29 March 1953, with a futile raid against the army garrison at Salamá, in the central Guatemalan department of Baja Verapaz. The rebellion was swiftly crushed, and a number of participants were arrested. Several CIA agents and allies were imprisoned, weakening the coup effort. Thus the CIA came to rely more heavily on the Guatemalan exile groups and their anti-democratic allies in Guatemala. The CIA considered several candidates to lead the coup. Miguel Ydígoras Fuentes, the conservative candidate who had lost the 1950 election to Árbenz, held favor with the Guatemalan opposition but was rejected for his role in the Ubico regime, as well as his European appearance, which was unlikely to appeal to the majority mixed-race mestizo population. Another popular candidate was the coffee planter Juan Córdova Cerna, who had briefly served in Arévalo's cabinet before becoming the legal adviser to the UFC. The death of his son in an anti-government uprising in 1950 turned him against the government, and he had planned the unsuccessful Salamá coup in 1953 before fleeing to join Castillo Armas in exile. Although his status as a civilian gave him an advantage over Castillo Armas, he was diagnosed with throat cancer in 1954, taking him out of the reckoning. Thus it was Castillo Armas, in exile since the failed 1949 coup and on the CIA's payroll since the aborted PBFortune in 1951, who was to lead the coming coup.

Castillo Armas was given enough money to recruit a small force of mercenaries from among Guatemalan exiles and the populations of nearby countries. This band was called the Army of Liberation. The CIA established training camps in Nicaragua and Honduras and supplied them with weapons as well as several bombers. The U.S. signed military agreements with both those countries prior to the invasion of Guatemala, allowing it to move heavier arms freely. The CIA trained at least 1,725 foreign guerillas plus thousands of additional militants as reserves. These preparations were only superficially covert: the CIA intended Árbenz to find out about them, as a part of its plan to convince the Guatemalan people that the overthrow of Árbenz was a fait accompli. Additionally, the CIA made covert contact with a number of church leaders throughout the Guatemalan countryside, and persuaded them to incorporate anti-government messages into their sermons.

=== Caracas conference and U.S. propaganda ===
While preparations for Operation PBSuccess were underway, Washington issued a series of statements denouncing the Guatemalan government, alleging that it had been infiltrated by communists. The State Department also asked the Organization of American States to modify the agenda of the Inter-American Conference, which was scheduled to be held in Caracas in March 1954, requesting the addition of an item titled "Intervention of International Communism in the American Republics", which was widely seen as a move targeting Guatemala. On 29 and 30 January 1954, the Guatemalan government published documents containing information leaked to it by a member of Castillo Armas' team who had turned against him. Lacking in original documents, the government had engaged in poor forgery to enhance the information it possessed, undermining the credibility of its charges. A spate of arrests followed of allies of Castillo Armas within Guatemala, and the government issued statements implicating a "Government of the North" in a plot to overthrow Árbenz. Washington denied these allegations, and the U.S. media uniformly took the side of their government; even publications which had until then provided relatively balanced coverage of Guatemala, such as The Christian Science Monitor, suggested that Árbenz had succumbed to communist propaganda. Several Congressmen also pointed to the allegations from the Guatemalan government as proof that it had become communist.

At the conference in Caracas, the various Latin American governments sought economic aid from the U.S., as well as its continuing non-intervention in their internal affairs. The U.S. government's aim was to pass a resolution condemning the supposed spread of communism in the Western Hemisphere. The Guatemalan foreign minister Guillermo Toriello argued strongly against the resolution, stating that it represented the "internationalization of McCarthyism". Despite support among the delegates for Toriello's views, the anti-communist resolution passed with only Guatemala voting against, because of the votes of dictatorships dependent on the U.S. and the threat of economic pressure applied by John Dulles. Although support among the delegates for Dulles' strident anti-communism was less strong than he and Eisenhower had hoped for, the conference marked a victory for the U.S., which was able to make concrete Latin American views on communism.

The U.S. had stopped selling arms to Guatemala in 1951 while signing bilateral defense agreements and increasing arms shipments to neighboring Honduras and Nicaragua. The U.S. promised the Guatemalan military that it too could obtain arms—if Árbenz were deposed. In 1953, the State Department aggravated the U.S. arms embargo by thwarting the Árbenz government's arms purchases from Canada, Germany, and Rhodesia. By 1954 Árbenz had become desperate for weapons, and decided to acquire them secretly from Czechoslovakia, which would have been the first time that a Soviet bloc country shipped weapons to the Americas, an action seen as establishing a communist beachhead in the Americas. The weapons were delivered to Guatemala at the Atlantic port of Puerto Barrios by the Swedish freight ship MS Alfhem, which sailed from Szczecin in Poland. The U.S. failed to intercept the shipment despite imposing an illegal naval quarantine on Guatemala. However "Guatemalan army officers" quoted in The New York Times said that "some of the arms ... were duds, worn out, or entirely wrong for use there". The CIA portrayed the shipment of these weapons as Soviet interference in the United States' backyard; it was the final spur for the CIA to launch its coup.

U.S. rhetoric abroad also had an effect on the Guatemalan military. The military had always been anti-communist, and Ambassador Peurifoy had applied pressure on senior officers since his arrival in Guatemala in October 1953. Árbenz had intended the secret shipment of weapons from the Alfhem to be used to bolster peasant militias, in the event of army disloyalty, but the U.S. informed army chiefs of the shipment, forcing Árbenz to hand them over to the military, and deepening the rift between him and his top generals.

=== Psychological warfare ===
Castillo Armas' army of 480 men was not large enough to defeat the Guatemalan military, even with U.S.-supplied aircraft. Therefore, the plans for Operation PBSuccess called for a campaign of psychological warfare, which would present Castillo Armas' victory as a fait accompli to the Guatemalan people, and would force Árbenz to resign. The propaganda campaign had begun well before the invasion, with the U.S. Information Agency (USIA) writing hundreds of articles on Guatemala based on CIA reports, and distributing tens of thousands of leaflets throughout Latin America. The CIA persuaded friendly governments to screen video footage of Guatemala that supported the U.S. version of events. As part of the psychological warfare, the U.S. Psychological Strategy Board authorized a "Nerve War Against Individuals" to instill fear and paranoia in potential loyalists and other potential opponents of the coup. This campaign included death threats against political leaders deemed loyal or deemed to be communist, and the sending of small wooden coffins, non-functioning bombs, and hangman's nooses to such people. The U.S. bombing was also intended to have psychological consequences with E. Howard Hunt of the CIA saying "What we wanted to do was to have a terror campaign, to terrify Arbenz particularly, to terrify his troops, much as the German Stuka bombers terrified the population of Holland, Belgium and Poland".

Alfhem's success in evading the quarantine led to Washington escalating its intimidation of Guatemala through its navy. On 24 May, the U.S. launched Operation Hardrock Baker, a naval blockade of Guatemala. Ships and submarines patrolled the Guatemalan coasts, and all approaching ships were stopped and searched; these included ships from Britain and France, violating international law. However Britain and France did not protest very strongly, hoping that in return the U.S. would not interfere with their efforts to subdue rebellious colonies in the Middle East. The intimidation was not solely naval; on 26 May one of Castillo Armas' planes flew over the capital, dropping leaflets that exhorted people to struggle against communism and support Castillo Armas.

The most wide-reaching psychological weapon was the radio station Voice of Liberation, La Voz de la Liberación. E. Howard Hunt's deputy, David Atlee Phillips, directed the radio station. It began broadcasting on 1 May 1954, carrying anti-communist propaganda, telling its listeners to resist the Árbenz government and support the liberating forces of Castillo Armas. The station claimed to be broadcasting from deep within the jungles of the Guatemalan hinterland, a message which many listeners believed. This belief extended outside of Guatemala itself, with foreign correspondents from publications such as The New York Times believing it to be the most authentic source of information. In actuality, the broadcasts were concocted in Miami by Guatemalan exiles, flown to Central America, and broadcast through a mobile transmitter. The Voice of Liberation made an initial broadcast that was repeated four times, after which it took to transmitting two-hour bulletins twice a day. The transmissions were initially only heard intermittently in Guatemala City; a week later, the CIA significantly increased their transmitting power, allowing clear reception in the Guatemalan capital. The radio broadcasts have been given a lot of credit by historians for the success of the coup, owing to the unrest they created throughout the country. They were unexpectedly assisted by the outage of the government-run radio station, which stopped transmitting for three weeks while a new antenna was being fitted. The Voice of Liberation transmissions continued throughout the conflict, broadcasting exaggerated news of rebel troops converging on the capital, and contributing to massive demoralization among both the army and the civilian population.

=== Castillo Armas' invasion ===
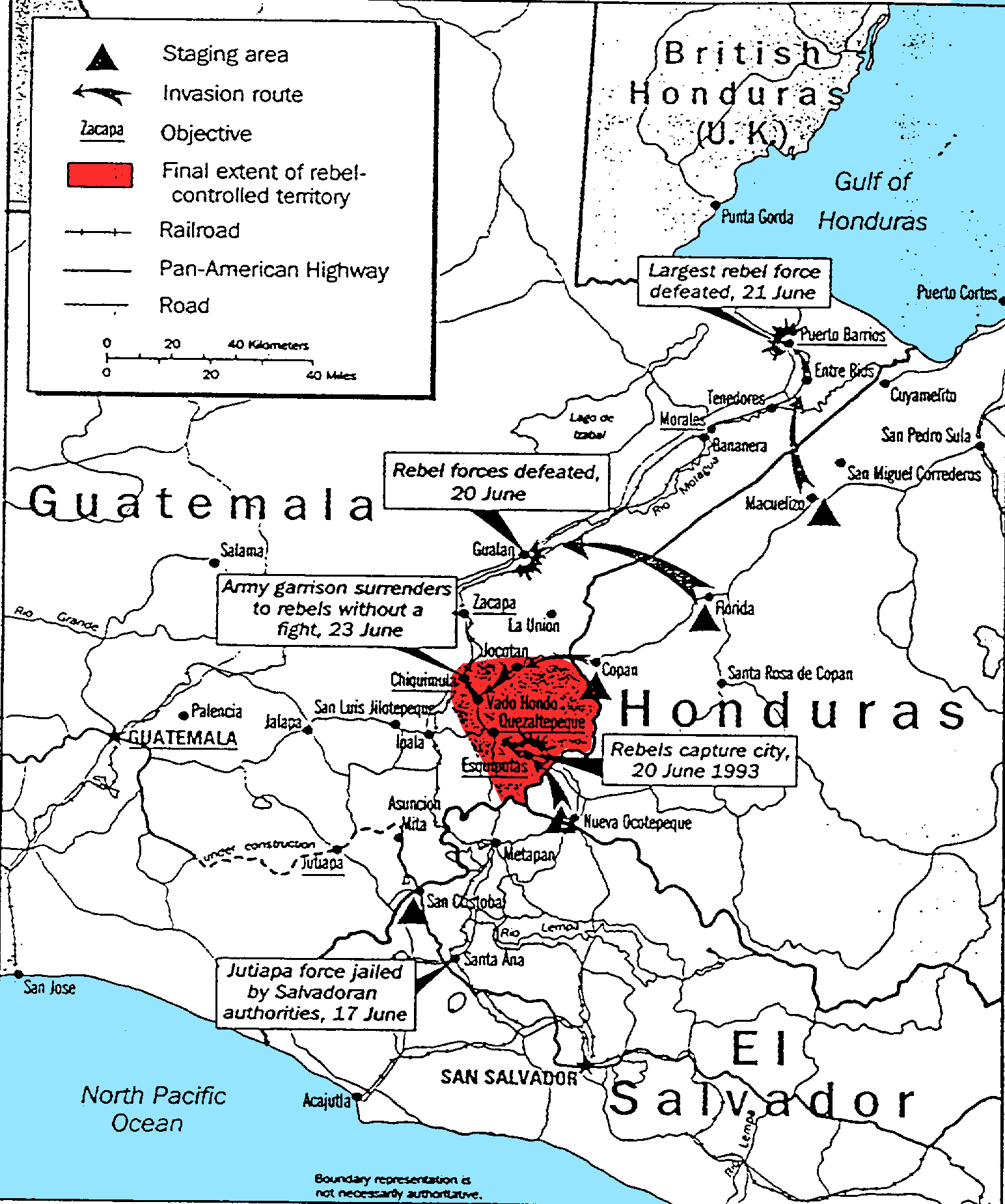
The CIA-trained and funded army of Carlos Castillo Armas invaded the Republic of Guatemala from Honduras and from El Salvador. The invasion force was split into four teams, targeting the towns of Puerto Barrios, Zacapa, Esquipulas and Jutiapa.

Castillo Armas' force of 480 men had been split into four teams, ranging in size from 60 to 198. On 15 June 1954 these four forces left their bases in Honduras and El Salvador, and assembled in various towns just outside the Guatemalan border. The largest force was supposed to attack the Atlantic harbor town of Puerto Barrios, while the others attacked the smaller towns of Esquipulas, Jutiapa, and Zacapa, the Guatemalan army's largest frontier post. Zapaca was of great significance to controlling Guatemala as it handled the majority of commerce along key rail routes. The invasion plan quickly faced difficulties; the 60-man force was intercepted and jailed by Salvadoran policemen before it got to the border. At 8:20 am on 18 June 1954, Castillo Armas led his invading troops over the border. Ten trained saboteurs preceded the invasion, with the aim of blowing up railways and cutting telegraph lines. At about the same time, Castillo Armas' planes flew over a pro-government rally in the capital. The U.S. Psychological Strategy Board ordered the bombing of the Matamoros Fortress in downtown Guatemala City, and a U.S. P-47 warplane flown by a mercenary pilot bombed the city of Chiquimula. Castillo Armas demanded Árbenz's immediate surrender. The invasion provoked a brief panic in the capital, which quickly decreased as the rebels failed to make any striking moves. Bogged down by supplies and a lack of transportation, Castillo Armas' forces took several days to reach their targets, although their planes blew up a bridge on 19 June.

When the rebels did reach their targets, they met with further setbacks. The force of 122 men targeting Zacapa were intercepted and decisively beaten by a garrison of 30 Guatemalan soldiers, with only 30 men escaping death or capture. The force that attacked Puerto Barrios was dispatched by policemen and armed dockworkers, with many of the rebels fleeing back to Honduras. In an effort to regain momentum, the rebel planes tried air attacks on the capital. These attacks caused little material damage, but they had a significant psychological impact, leading many citizens to believe that the invasion force was more powerful than it actually was. The rebel bombers needed to fly out of the Nicaraguan capital of Managua; as a result, they had a limited payload. A large number of them substituted dynamite or Molotov cocktails for bombs, in an effort to create loud bangs with a lower payload. The planes targeted ammunition depots, parade grounds, and other visible targets. On 22 June, another plane bombed the Honduran town of San Pedro de Copán; John Dulles claimed the attack had been conducted by the Guatemalan air force, thus avoiding diplomatic consequences.

However, by 22 June 1954, Armas' forces were down to one P-47 which made an ineffective air strike on the capital. The CIA sponsors of Armas began to worry Operation PBSuccess might fail. Col. Al Haney, heading the CIA's operation, informed Allen Dulles that more aircraft was needed or else the Armas invasion would surely fail. Dulles made arrangements for the sale of three additional P-47s from the military to the Nicaraguan government, to be paid for by William Pawley, a successful businessman, Eisenhower supporter, and CIA consultant. In an Oval Office meeting, Dulles and others briefed President Eisenhower on the need for additional aircraft in the Armas invasion. Upon Eisenhower's approval, the planes were purchased by Pawley on behalf of the Nicaraguan government. The P-47s flew from Puerto Rico to Panama and went into action on 23 June, hitting Guatemalan army forces and other targets in the capital. Early in the morning on 27 June 1954, a plane attacked Puerto San José and bombed the British cargo ship, SS Springfjord, which was on charter to the U.S. company W.R. Grace and Company Line, and was being loaded with Guatemalan cotton and coffee. This incident cost the CIA one million U.S. dollars in compensation. (Note: equivalent to $12,000,000 in 2025)

=== Guatemalan response ===
The Árbenz government originally meant to repel the invasion by arming the military-age populace, workers' militias, and the Guatemalan Army. Resistance from the armed forces, as well as public knowledge of the secret arms purchase, compelled the President to supply arms only to the Army. From the beginning of the invasion, Árbenz was confident that Castillo Armas could be defeated militarily and expressed this confidence in public. But he was worried that a defeat for Castillo Armas would provoke a direct invasion by the U.S. military. This also contributed to his decision not to arm civilians initially; lacking a military reason to do so, this could have cost him the support of the army. Carlos Enrique Díaz, the chief of the Guatemalan armed forces, told Árbenz that arming civilians would be unpopular with his soldiers, and that "the army [would] do its duty".

Árbenz instead told Díaz to select officers to lead a counter-attack. Díaz chose a corps of officers who were all regarded to be men of personal integrity, and who were loyal to Árbenz. On the night of 19 June, most of the Guatemalan troops in the capital region left for Zacapa, joined by smaller detachments from other garrisons. Árbenz stated that "the invasion was a farce", but worried that if it was defeated on the Honduran border, Honduras would use it as an excuse to declare war on Guatemala, which would lead to a U.S. invasion. Because of the rumours spread by the Voice of Liberation, there were worries throughout the countryside that a fifth column attack was imminent; large numbers of peasants went to the government and asked for weapons to defend their country. They were repeatedly told that the army was "successfully defending our country". Nonetheless, peasant volunteers assisted the government war effort, manning roadblocks and donating supplies to the army. Weapons shipments dropped by rebel planes were intercepted and turned over to the government.

The Árbenz government also pursued diplomatic means to try to end the invasion. It sought support from El Salvador and Mexico; Mexico declined to get involved, and the Salvadoran government merely reported the Guatemalan effort to Peurifoy. Árbenz's largest diplomatic initiative was in taking the issue to the United Nations Security Council. On 18 June the Guatemalan foreign minister petitioned the council to "take measures necessary ... to put a stop to the aggression", which he said Nicaragua and Honduras were responsible for, along with "certain foreign monopolies which have been affected by the progressive policy of my government". The Security Council looked at Guatemala's complaint at an emergency session on 20 June. The debate was lengthy and heated, with Nicaragua and Honduras denying any wrongdoing, and the U.S. stating that Eisenhower's role as a general in World War II demonstrated that he was against imperialism. The Soviet Union was the only country to support Guatemala. When the U.S. and its allies proposed referring the matter to the Organization of American States, the Soviet Union vetoed the proposal. Guatemala continued to press for a Security Council investigation and a meeting of the Security Council was called for on 25 June. On 24 June, Eisenhower and Dulles met with British Prime Minister Winston Churchill and Foreign Secretary Anthony Eden, who were visiting the White House for another matter. They spoke with the British representatives, warning them that if they did not withdraw their support for the UN inquiry, the U.S. would not support Great Britain on issues important to them, such as the Suez Canal. They echoed this sentiment to the French, but for their interests in Cyprus and Indochina. During the vote, Britain and France abstained, defeating the resolution for an investigation. UN Secretary General Dag Hammarskjöld called the U.S. position "the most serious blow so far aimed at the [United Nations]". A fact-finding mission was set up by the Inter-American Peace Committee; Washington used its influence to delay the entry of the committee until the coup was complete and a military dictatorship installed.

=== Árbenz's resignation ===
Árbenz was initially confident that his army would quickly dispatch the rebel force. The victory of a small garrison of 30 soldiers over the 180 strong rebel force outside Zacapa strengthened his belief. By 21 June, Guatemalan soldiers had gathered at Zacapa under the command of Colonel Víctor M. León, who was believed to be loyal to Árbenz. León told Árbenz that the counter-attack would be delayed for logistical reasons, but assured him not to worry, as Castillo Armas would be defeated very soon. Other members of the government were not so certain. Army Chief of Staff Parinello inspected the troops at Zacapa on 23 June, and returned to the capital believing that the army would not fight. Afraid of a U.S. intervention in Castillo Armas' favor, he did not tell Árbenz of his suspicions. PGT leaders also began to have their suspicions; acting secretary general Alvarado Monzón sent a member of the central committee to Zacapa to investigate. He returned on 25 June, reporting that the army was highly demoralized, and would not fight. Monzón reported this to Árbenz, who quickly sent another investigator. He too returned the same report, carrying an additional message for Árbenz from the officers at Zacapa—asking the President to resign. The officers believed that given U.S. support for the rebels, defeat was inevitable, and Árbenz was to blame for it. He stated that if Árbenz did not resign, the army was likely to strike a deal with Castillo Armas, and march on the capital with him.

During this period, Castillo Armas had begun to intensify his aerial attacks with the extra planes that Eisenhower had approved. They had limited material success; many of their bombs were surplus material from World War II, and failed to explode. Nonetheless, they had a significant psychological impact. On 25 June, the same day that he received the army's ultimatum, Árbenz learned that Castillo Armas had scored what later proved to be his only military victory, defeating the Guatemalan garrison at Chiquimula. Historian Piero Gleijeses has stated that if it were not for U.S. support for the rebellion, the officer corps of the Guatemalan army would have remained loyal to Árbenz because, although they were not uniformly his supporters, they were more wary of Castillo Armas, and also had strong nationalist views. As it was, they believed that the U.S. would intervene militarily, leading to a battle they could not win.

On the night of 25 June, Árbenz called a meeting of the senior leaders of the government, the political parties, and the labor unions. Colonel Díaz was also present. The President told them that the army at Zacapa had abandoned the government, and that the civilian population needed to be armed to defend the country. Díaz raised no objections, and the unions pledged several thousand troops. When the troops were mustered the next day, only a few hundred showed up. The civilian population of the capital had fought alongside the Guatemalan Revolution twice before—during the popular uprising of 1944, and during the attempted coup of 1949—but on this occasion the army, intimidated by the U.S., refused to fight. The union members were reluctant to fight both the invasion and their own military. Seeing this, Díaz reneged on his support of the President, and began plotting to overthrow Árbenz with the assistance of other senior army officers. They informed Peurifoy of this plan, asking him to stop the hostilities in return for Árbenz's resignation. Peurifoy promised to arrange a truce, and the plotters went to Árbenz and informed him of their decision. Árbenz, utterly exhausted and seeking to preserve at least a measure of the democratic reforms that he had brought, agreed with one stipulation. Árbenz asked his Army Chief of Staff Colonel Carlos Enrique Díaz, who was to assume leadership, to refuse to negotiate with Castillo Armas after he left, to which Díaz agreed. After informing his cabinet of his decision, Árbenz left the presidential palace at 8 pm on 27 June 1954, having taped a resignation speech that was broadcast an hour later. In it, he stated that he was resigning to eliminate the "pretext for the invasion", and that he wished to preserve the gains of the October Revolution of 1944. He walked to the nearby Mexican Embassy, seeking political asylum. Two months later he was granted safe passage out of the country, and flew to exile in Mexico.

Some 120 Árbenz loyalists or communists were also allowed to leave, and the CIA stated that none of the assassination plans contemplated by the CIA were actually implemented. On June 30, 1954, the CIA began a comprehensive destruction process of documents related to Operation PBSuccess. When an oversight committee of the United States Senate in 1975 investigated the history of the CIA's assassinations program and requested information about the CIA's assassination program as part of Operation PBSuccess, the CIA stated it had lost all such records. Journalist Annie Jacobsen states that the CIA claim of no assassinations having taken place is doubtful. In May 1997, the CIA stated it had rediscovered some of its documents that it had said were lost. The names of assassination targets had all been redacted, which made it impossible to verify whether any of the people on the CIA assassination list were actually killed as part of the operation.

=== Military governments ===
Immediately after the President announced his resignation, Díaz announced on the radio that he was taking over the presidency, and that the army would continue to fight against the invasion of Castillo Armas. He headed a military junta which also consisted of Colonels Elfego Hernán Monzón Aguirre and Jose Angel Sánchez. Two days later Ambassador Peurifoy told Díaz that he had to resign because, in the words of a CIA officer who spoke to Díaz, he was "not convenient for American foreign policy". Peurifoy castigated Díaz for allowing Árbenz to criticize the United States in his resignation speech; meanwhile, a U.S.-trained pilot dropped a bomb on the army's main powder magazine to intimidate the colonel. Soon after, Díaz was overthrown by a rapid bloodless coup led by Colonel Monzón, who was more pliable to U.S. interests. Díaz later stated that Peurifoy had presented him with a list of names of communists, and demanded that all of them be shot by the next day; Díaz had refused, turning Peurifoy further against him. On 17 June, the army leaders at Zacapa had begun to negotiate with Castillo Armas. They signed a pact, the Pacto de Las Tunas, three days later, which placed the army at Zacapa under Castillo Armas, in return for a general amnesty. The army returned to its barracks a few days later, "despondent, with a terrible sense of defeat".

Although Monzón was staunchly anti-communist and repeatedly spoke of his loyalty to the U.S., he was unwilling to hand over power to Castillo Armas. The fall of Díaz led Peurifoy to believe that the CIA should let the State Department play the lead role in negotiating with the new government. The State Department asked Óscar Osorio, the dictator of El Salvador, to invite all players for talks in San Salvador. Osorio agreed, and Monzón and Castillo Armas arrived in the Salvadoran capital on 30 June. Peurifoy initially remained in Guatemala City, to avoid the appearance of a heavy U.S. role but was forced to travel to San Salvador when the negotiations came close to breaking down on the first day. In the words of John Dulles, Peurifoy's role was to "crack some heads together". Neither Monzón nor Castillo Armas could have remained in power without U.S. support, so Peurifoy was able to force an agreement, which was announced at 4:45 am on 2 July. Castillo Armas and his subordinate Major Enrique Trinidad Oliva joined the three-person junta headed by Monzón, who remained president. On 7 July Colonels Dubois and Cruz Salazar, Monzón's supporters on the junta, resigned, according to the secret agreement they had made without Monzón's knowledge. Outnumbered, Monzón also resigned, allowing Castillo Armas to be unanimously elected president of the junta. The two colonels were paid 100,000 U.S. dollars apiece for their cooperation. (Note: equivalent to $1,200,000 in 2025) The U.S. promptly recognized the new government on 13 July. Soon after taking office, Castillo Armas faced a coup from young army cadets, who were unhappy with the army's surrender. The coup was crushed, leaving 29 dead and 91 wounded. Elections were held in early October, from which all political parties were barred. Castillo Armas was the only candidate; he won the election with 99% of the vote.

=== Reactions ===
The Guatemalan coup d'état was reviled internationally. Le Monde of Paris and The Times of London attacked the coup as "economic colonialism". In Latin America, public and official opinion was sharply critical of the U.S., and for many Guatemala became a symbol of armed resistance to U.S. hegemony. Former British prime minister Clement Attlee called it "a plain act of aggression". When Allen Dulles described the coup as a victory of "democracy" over communism and claimed that the situation in Guatemala was "being cured by the Guatemalans themselves", a British official remarked that "it might almost be Molotov speaking about ... Czechoslovakia or Hitler speaking about Austria". UN Secretary General Hammarskjöld said that the paramilitary invasion was a geopolitical action that violated the human rights stipulations of the United Nations Charter. Even the usually pro-U.S. newspapers of West Germany condemned the coup. Kate Doyle, the Director of the Mexico Project of the National Security Archives, described the coup as the definitive deathblow to democracy in Guatemala.

The coup had broad support among U.S. politicians. Historian Piero Gleijeses writes that the foreign policy of both Republican and Democratic parties expressed an intransigent assertion of U.S. hegemony over Central America, making them predisposed to seeing communist threats where none existed. Thus Eisenhower's continuation of the Monroe Doctrine had bipartisan support. The coup met with strong negative reactions in Latin America; a wave of anti-United States protests followed. These sentiments persisted for several decades; historians have pointed to the coup as a reason for the hostile reception given to U.S. vice president Richard Nixon when he visited Latin America four years later. A State Department study found that negative public reactions to the coup had occurred in eleven Latin American countries, including a few that were otherwise pro-American. Historian John Lewis Gaddis states that knowledge of the CIA's role in coups in Iran and Guatemala gave the agency "an almost mythic reputation throughout Latin America and the Middle East as an instrument with which the United States could depose governments it disliked, whenever it wished to do so".

== Aftermath ==
=== Operation PBHistory ===
The logo of the PGT, whose offices were searched during Operation PBHistory in the hope that they would yield incriminating documents

Operation PBHistory was an effort by the CIA to analyze documents from the Árbenz government to justify the 1954 coup after the fact, in particular by finding evidence that Guatemalan communists had been under the influence of the Soviet Union. Because of the quick overthrow of the Árbenz government, the CIA believed that the administration would not have been able to destroy any incriminating documents, and that these could be analyzed to demonstrate Árbenz's supposed Soviet ties. The CIA also believed this would help it better understand the workings of Latin American communist parties, on which subject the CIA had very little real information. A final motivation was that international responses to the coup had been very negative, even among allies of the U.S., and the CIA wished to counteract this anti-U.S. sentiment. The operation began on 4 July 1954 with the arrival of four CIA agents in Guatemala City, led by a specialist in the structure of communist parties. Their targets included Árbenz's personal belongings, police documents, and the headquarters of the Guatemalan Party of Labour.

Although the initial search failed to find any links to the Soviet Union, the CIA decided to extend the operation, and on 4 August a much larger team was deployed, with members from many government departments, including the State Department and the USIA. The task force was given the cover name Social Research Group. To avoid confrontation with Guatemalan nationalists, the CIA opted to leave the documents in Guatemalan possession, instead funding the creation of a Guatemalan intelligence agency that would try to dismantle the communist organizations. Thus the National Committee of Defense Against Communism (Comité de Defensa Nacional Contra el Comunismo) was created on 20 July, and granted a great deal of power over military and police functions. The personnel of the new agency were also put to work analyzing the same documents. The document-processing phase of the operation was terminated on 28 September 1954, having examined 500,000 documents. There was tension between the different U.S. government agencies about using the information; the CIA wished to use it to subvert communists, the USIA for propaganda. The CIA's leadership of the operation allowed it to retain control over any documents deemed necessary for clandestine operations.

In the subsequent decade, the documents gathered were used by the authors of several books, most frequently with covert CIA assistance, which described the Guatemalan Revolution and the 1954 coup in terms favorable to the CIA. Despite the efforts of the CIA, both international and academic reaction to U.S. policy remained highly negative. Even books partially funded by the CIA were somewhat critical of its role. PBHistory failed in its chief objective of finding convincing evidence that the PGT had been instruments of the Soviet Union, or even that it had any connection to Moscow whatsoever. The Soviet description of the coup, that the U.S. had crushed a democratic revolution to protect the United Fruit Company's control over the Guatemalan economy, became much more widely accepted. Historian Mark Hove stated that "Operation PBHistory proved ineffective because of 'a new, smoldering resentment' that had emerged in Latin America over US intervention in Guatemala."

=== Political legacy ===
The 1954 coup had significant political fallout both inside and outside Guatemala. The relatively easy overthrow of Árbenz, coming soon after the similar overthrow of the democratically elected Iranian prime minister in 1953, made the CIA overconfident in its abilities, which led to the failed Bay of Pigs Invasion to overthrow the Cuban government in 1961. Throughout the years of the Guatemalan Revolution, both United States policy makers and the U.S. media had tended to believe the theory of a communist threat. When Árbenz had announced that he had evidence of U.S. complicity in the Salamá incident, it had been dismissed, and virtually the entire U.S. press portrayed Castillo Armas' invasion as a dramatic victory against communism. The press in Latin America were less restrained in their criticism of the U.S., and the coup resulted in lasting anti-United States sentiment in the region. Outside of the Western Hemisphere, the Soviet Union were pushing to force the Guatemalan issue into the discussion of the UN security council. Allies of the United States, such as the United Kingdom, came very close to joining the Soviet Union's side in this argument, backing out at the last minute.

Among the civilians in Guatemala City during the coup was a 25-year-old Che Guevara. After a couple of abortive attempts to fight on the side of the government, Guevara took shelter at the embassy of Argentina, before eventually being granted safe passage to Mexico, where he would join the Cuban Revolution. His experience of the Guatemalan coup was a large factor in convincing him "of the necessity for armed struggle ... against imperialism", and would inform his successful military strategy during the Cuban Revolution. Árbenz's experience during the Guatemalan coup also helped Fidel Castro's Cuban regime in thwarting the CIA invasion.

Within Guatemala, Castillo Armas worried that he lacked popular support, and thus tried to eliminate all opposition. He promptly arrested several thousand opposition leaders, branding them communists, repealed the constitution of 1945, and granted himself virtually unbridled power. Concentration camps were built to hold the prisoners when the jails overflowed. Acting on the advice of Allen Dulles, Castillo Armas detained a number of citizens trying to flee the country. He also created the National Committee of Defense Against Communism, with sweeping powers of arrest, detention, and deportation. Over the next few years, the committee investigated nearly 70,000 people. An insurgency in opposition to the junta soon developed. The government responded with a campaign of harsh suppression. Thousands were imprisoned arbitrarily, with few ever facing trial. Many were executed; "disappeared"; tortured; or maimed. At Finca Jocatán, in the vicinity of Tiquisate, where the first private sector union in the country had been founded at the start of the revolution in 1944, an estimated 1000 United Fruit workers were executed in the immediate aftermath of the coup. Castillo Armas outlawed all labor unions, peasant organizations, and political parties, except for his own, the National Liberation Movement (Movimiento de Liberación Nacional, MLN), which was the ruling party until 1957, and remained influential for decades after.

Castillo Armas' dependence on the officer corps and the mercenaries who had put him in power led to widespread corruption, and the Eisenhower administration was soon subsidizing the Guatemalan government with many millions of U.S. dollars. Castillo Armas also reversed the agrarian reforms of Árbenz, leading the U.S. embassy to comment that it was a "long step backwards" from the previous policy. Castillo Armas was assassinated in 1957. The UFC did not profit from the coup; although it regained most of its privileges, its profits continued to decline, and it was eventually merged with another company to save itself from bankruptcy. Despite the influence which some of the local Catholic Church leaders had in the coup, anti-Catholic restrictions which had been enforced under previous governments in Guatemala resumed by the 1960s, as many anti-communist governments felt the Church had too much sympathy towards socialist parties.

=== Civil War ===
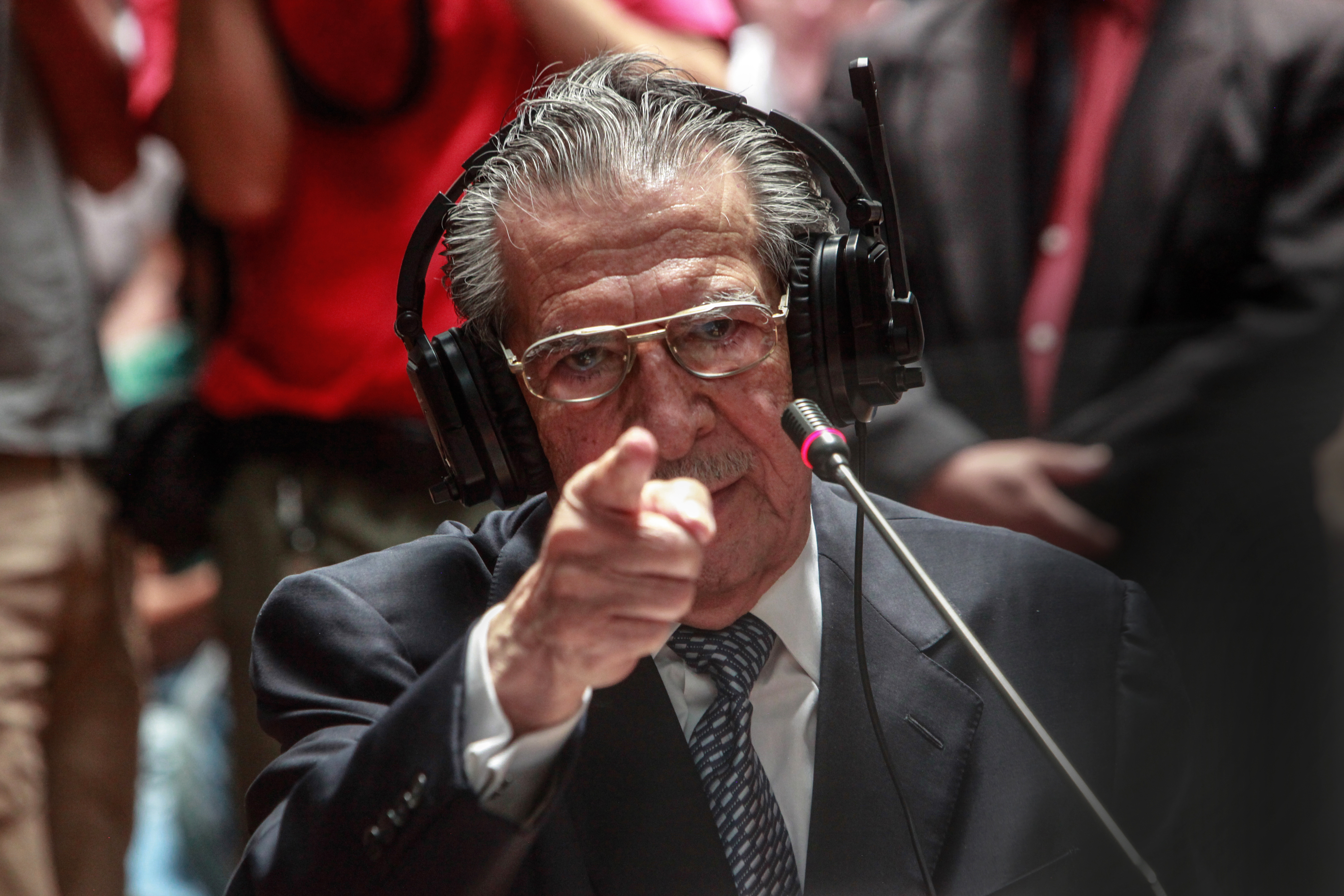
Efraín Ríos Montt, President of Guatemala during some of the most violent years of the civil war

The rolling-back of progressive policies resulted in a series of leftist insurgencies in the countryside, beginning in 1960. This triggered the 36-year Guatemalan Civil War between the U.S.-backed military government and the leftist insurgents, who frequently had significant popular support. The largest of these movements was led by the Guerrilla Army of the Poor, which at its largest point had 270,000 members. During the civil war, atrocities against civilians were committed by both sides; 93% of these violations were committed by the U.S.-backed military, which included a genocidal scorched-earth campaign against the indigenous Maya population in the 1980s. The violence was particularly severe during the presidencies of Ríos Montt and Lucas García.

Other human rights violations committed included massacres of civilian populations, rape, aerial bombardment, and forced disappearances. Gleijeses wrote that Guatemala was "ruled by a culture of fear", and that it held the "macabre record for human rights violations in Latin America". These violations were partially the result of a particularly brutal counter-insurgency strategy adopted by the government. The ideological narrative that the 1954 coup had represented a battle against communism was often used to justify the violence in the 1980s. Historians have attributed the violence of the civil war to the 1954 coup and the "anti-communist paranoia" that it generated. The civil war ended in 1996, with a peace accord between the guerrillas and the government, which included an amnesty for fighters on both sides. The civil war killed an estimated 200,000 civilians. (Note: The figure of 200,000 is not universally accepted; historian Carlos Sabina argues for a much lower total of 37,000 civil war deaths, while a 2008 study in The BMJ gave an estimate of 20,000.)

=== Apologies ===
U.S. president Bill Clinton apologized to Guatemala in 1999 for the atrocities committed by the U.S.-backed dictatorships. The apology came soon after the release of a truth commission report that documented U.S. support for the military forces that committed genocide.

In 2011, the Guatemalan government signed an agreement with Árbenz's surviving family to restore his legacy and publicly apologize for the government's role in ousting him. This included a financial settlement to the family. The formal apology was made at the National Palace by Guatemalan president Álvaro Colom on 20 October 2011, to Jacobo Árbenz Villanova, the son of the former president. Colom stated, "It was a crime to Guatemalan society and it was an act of aggression to a government starting its democratic spring." The agreement established several forms of reparation for Árbenz's family.

== See also ==
- History of the Central Intelligence Agency
- Operation Kufire
- Operation Kugown
- Operation Washtub
- United States involvement in regime change
- 1953 Iranian coup d'état

== Notes and references ==
=== Bibliography ===
- Bartrop, Paul R.; Jacobs, Steven Leonard (2015). Modern Genocide: The Definitive Resource and Document Collection. Santa Barbara, California: ABC-CLIO. ISBN 978-1-61069-364-6.
- Bevins, Vincent (2020). "Chapter 2: Independent Indonesia". The Jakarta Method. PublicAffairs. ISBN 978-1-5417-4240-6.
- Blum, William (2003). Killing Hope: US Military and CIA Interventions Since World War II. London: Zed Books. ISBN 978-1-84277-369-7.
- Broder, John M. (11 March 1999). "Clinton Offers His Apologies to Guatemala". The New York Times.
- Castañeda, Manolo E. Vela (2005). "Guatemala 1954: Las ideas de la contrarrevolución". Foro Internacional (in Spanish). 45 (1): 89–114. JSTOR 27738691.
- Chapman, Peter (2007). Bananas!: How the United Fruit Company Shaped the World. New York City, New York: Canongate Books. ISBN 978-1-84195-881-1.
- Cullather, Nicholas (1994). Operation PBSUCCESS: The United States and Guatemala, 1952–1954. Center for the Study of Intelligence, Central Intelligence Agency.
- Cullather, Nicholas (2006). Secret History: The CIA's classified account of its operations in Guatemala, 1952–1954. Palo Alto, California: Stanford University Press. ISBN 978-0-8047-5468-2.
- Figueroa Ibarra, Carlos (May–August 2006). "Izquierda y violencia revolucionaria en Guatemala (1954–1960)". Fermentum (in Spanish). 16 (46): 395–414.
- Figueroa Ibarra, Carlos (January–February 1990). "Guatemala el recurso del miedo". Nueva Sociedad (105): 108–117.
- Forster, Cindy (2001). The Time of Freedom: Campesino Workers in Guatemala's October Revolution. Pittsburgh, Pennsylvania: University of Pittsburgh Press. ISBN 978-0-8229-4162-0.
- Fraser, Andrew (21 August 2005). "Architecture of a broken dream: The CIA and Guatemala, 1952–54". Intelligence and National Security. 20 (3): 486–508. doi:10.1080/02684520500269010. S2CID 154550395.
- Gaddis, John Lewis (2006). The Cold War: A New History. New York City, New York: Penguin Books. ISBN 978-0-14-303827-6.
- Gilderhus, Mark T. (March 2006). "The Monroe Doctrine: Meanings and Implications". Presidential Studies Quarterly. 36 (1): 5–16. doi:10.1111/j.1741-5705.2006.00282.x. JSTOR 27552742.
- Gleijeses, Piero (1991). Shattered Hope: The Guatemalan Revolution and the United States, 1944–1954. Princeton, New Jersey: Princeton University Press. ISBN 978-0-691-02556-8.
- Gordon, Max (Summer 1971). "A Case History of U. S. Subversion: Guatemala, 1954". Science and Society. 35 (2): 129–155. JSTOR 40401561.
- Grandin, Greg (2000). The Blood of Guatemala: A History of Race and Nation. Durham, North Carolina: Duke University Press. ISBN 978-0-8223-2495-9.
- Grandin, Greg (2004). The Last Colonial Massacre. Chicago, Illinois: University of Chicago Press. ISBN 0-226-30572-4.
- Gruson, Sydney (9 July 1954). "Useless Weapons and Duds Sent Guatemala by Reds, Officers Say; REDS SENT DUDS TO GUATEMALANS". The New York Times. ISSN 0362-4331.
- Haines, Gerald (June 1995). "CIA and Guatemala Assassination Proposals, 1952–1954" (PDF). CIA Historical Review Program.
- Handy, Jim (1994). Revolution in the Countryside: Rural Conflict and Agrarian Reform in Guatemala, 1944–1954. Chapel Hill, North Carolina: University of North Carolina Press. ISBN 978-0-8078-4438-0.
- Harbury, Jennifer (2005). Truth, Torture, and the American Way: The History and Consequences of U.S. Involvement in Torture. Boston, Massachusetts: Beacon Press. ISBN 978-0-8070-0307-7.
- Holland, Max (2004). "Operation PBHISTORY: The Aftermath of SUCCESS". International Journal of Intelligence and CounterIntelligence. 17 (2): 300–332. doi:10.1080/08850600490274935. S2CID 153570470.
- Holland, Max (1 January 2005). "Private Sources of U.S. Foreign Policy: William Pawley and the 1954 Coup d'Etat in Guatemala". Journal of Cold War Studies. 7 (4): 36–73. doi:10.1162/1520397055012442. ISSN 1531-3298. S2CID 57563896 – via Project MUSE.
- Hove, Mark T. (September 2007). "The Arbenz Factor: Salvador Allende, U.S.-Chilean Relations, and the 1954 U.S. Intervention in Guatemala". Diplomatic History. 31 (4): 623–663. doi:10.1111/j.1467-7709.2007.00656.x.
- Immerman, Richard H. (1982). The CIA in Guatemala: The Foreign Policy of Intervention. Austin, Texas: University of Texas Press. ISBN 978-0-292-71083-2.
- Jacobsen, Annie (2019). Surprise, Kill, Vanish, The Secret History of CIA Paramilitary Armies, Operators, and Assassins. New York: Hachette. ISBN 978-0-316-44140-7.
- Jiménez, Hugo Murillo (1985). "La intervención Norteamericana en Guatemala en 1954: Dos interpretacines". Anuario de Estudios Centroamerica. 11 (2): 149–155.
- Kornbluh, Peter; Doyle, Kate, eds. (23 May 1997) [1994], "CIA and Assassinations: The Guatemala 1954 Documents", National Security Archive Electronic Briefing Book No. 4, Washington, D.C.: National Security Archive
- LaFeber, Walter (1993). Inevitable Revolutions: The United States in Central America. New York City, New York: W. W. Norton & Company. ISBN 0-393-03434-8.
- Lentz, Harris M. (2014). Heads of States and Governments Since 1945. Routledge. ISBN 978-1-134-26490-2.
- May, Rachel (March 1999). ""Surviving All Changes Is Your Destiny": Violence and Popular Movements in Guatemala". Latin American Perspectives. 26 (2): 68–91. doi:10.1177/0094582x9902600204. S2CID 143564997.
- Malkin, Elisabeth (20 October 2011). "An Apology for a Guatemalan Coup, 57 Years Later". The New York Times.
- McAllister, Carlota (2010). "A Headlong Rush into the Future". In Grandin, Greg; Joseph, Gilbert (eds.). A Century of Revolution. Durham, North Carolina: Duke University Press. pp. 276–309. ISBN 978-0-8223-9285-9.
- McCleary, Rachel M. (1999). Dictating Democracy: Guatemala and the End of Violent Revolution. Gainesville, Florida: University Press of Florida. ISBN 978-0-8130-1726-6.
- Mikaberidze, Alexander (2013). Atrocities, Massacres, and War Crimes: An Encyclopedia. Santa Barbara, California: ABC-CLIO, LLC. ISBN 978-1-59884-926-4.
- Navarro, Mireya (26 February 1999). "Guatemalan Army Waged 'Genocide,' New Report Finds". The New York Times.
- Nelson, Diane M. (2015). Who Counts?: The Mathematics of Death and Life after Genocide. Duke University Press. ISBN 978-0-8223-7507-4.
- Obermeyer, Ziad; Murray, Christopher J. L.; Gakidou, Emmanuela (26 June 2008). "Fifty years of violent war deaths from Vietnam to Bosnia: analysis of data from the world health survey programme". The BMJ. 336 (1482): 1482–1486. doi:10.1136/bmj.a137. PMC 2440905. PMID 18566045.
- "Historical Overview of Pentecostalism in Guatemala". Pew Research Center. 5 October 2006.
- Schlesinger, Stephen; Kinzer, Stephen (1999). Bitter Fruit: The Story of the American Coup in Guatemala (Revised and Expanded ed.). Cambridge, Massachusetts: Harvard University Press. ISBN 978-0-674-01930-0.
- Schlesinger, Stephen; Kinzer, Stephen (1982). Bitter Fruit: The Untold Story of the American Coup in Guatemala (1st ed.). Garden City, New York: Doubleday & Company, Inc. ISBN 0-385-14861-5.
- Smith, Gaddis (30 November 1995). The Last Years of the Monroe Doctrine, 1945–1993. New York City, New York: Hill and Wang. ISBN 978-0-8090-1568-9.
- Streeter, Stephen M. (2000). Managing the Counterrevolution: The United States and Guatemala, 1954–1961. Athens, Ohio: Ohio University Press. ISBN 978-0-89680-215-5.
- Young, John W. (1986). "Great Britain's Latin American Dilemma: The Foreign Office and the Overthrow of 'Communist' Guatemala, June 1954". The International History Review. 8 (4): 573–592 [p. 584]. doi:10.1080/07075332.1986.9640425.
