= LIV Corps =

LIV Corps or 54th Corps may refer to:

- 54th Corps (People's Republic of China)
- 54th Corps (German Empire)
- LIV Army Corps, Wehrmacht, Germany
- 54th Air Defence Corps, Soviet Union/Russia

== See also ==
- List of military corps by number
- 54th Army (disambiguation)
- 54th Brigade (disambiguation)
- 54th Division (disambiguation)
- 54th Regiment (disambiguation)
- 54th Squadron (disambiguation)
- 54th (disambiguation)
- LIV (disambiguation)
