= 54th =

54th is the ordinal form of the number 54. 54th or Fifty-fourth may also refer to:

- A fraction, 1/54, equal to one of 54 equal parts

== Geography ==
- 54th meridian east, a line of longitude
- 54th meridian west, a line of longitude
- 54th parallel north, a circle of latitude
- 54th parallel south, a circle of latitude
- 54th Street (disambiguation)

== Military ==
- 54th Army (disambiguation)
- 54th Brigade (disambiguation)
- 54th Division (disambiguation)
- 54th Regiment (disambiguation)
- 54th Squadron (disambiguation)

== Other ==
- 54th century
- 54th century BC

== See also ==
- 54 (disambiguation)
