= 54 =

54 may refer to:

- 54 (number), the natural number following 53 and preceding 55
- one of the years 54 BC, AD 54, 1954, 2054
- 54 (novel), a 2002 novel by Wu Ming
- Studio 54, a New York City nightclub from 1977 until 1981
- 54 (film), a 1998 American drama film about the club
- 54 (album), a 2010 album by Metropole Orkest
- "Fifty Four", a song by Karma to Burn from the album Arch Stanton, 2014
- 54th Division (disambiguation)
- 54th Regiment of Foot (disambiguation)
- 54th Infantry (disambiguation)
- 54 Alexandra, a main-belt asteroid
- Tatra 54, an automobile
- Argentina's international calling code

== See also ==
- 54th (disambiguation)
- LIV
