= L4 =

L4 or L-4 may refer to:

== Transportation ==
- L 4, an Imperial German Navy Zeppelin airship active during the First World War
- SP&S Class L-4, an 1884 steam locomotives class
- USS L-4 (SS-43), a 1915 United States Navy L-class submarine
- HMS L4, a 1918 British L class submarine
- Lawson L-4, a 1924 American unflown biplane airliner
- Piper Cub (U.S. military designation: L-4), an aircraft
- Inline-four engine (L4), a type of inline internal combustion four cylinder engine
  - Liberty L-4, a World War I four-cylinder, water-cooled, inline, aero-engine
- Lynx Aviation (IATA code)
- L4 (New York City bus), a temporary bus route in New York City
- L4, an S-Bahn line of the Léman Express in Switzerland and France
- Parramatta Light Rail, also known as the L4, a light rail service in Parramatta, Sydney, Australia
- Chaika L-4, a Russian twin-engined amphibious aircraft
- Soviet submarine L-4

== Science and technology ==
- L4 microkernel family, a family of operating system kernels
- L4, the transport layer in the OSI model of computer communications
- L4, the fourth Lagrangian point in an astronomical orbital configuration
- L^{4}, an L^{p} space for p=4 (sometimes called Lebesgue spaces)
- L-4, the fourth iteration of L-carrier, high capacity frequency division multiplex over coaxial cable used by the Bell System
- L4 paper; see Paper size

=== Biology ===
- Haplogroup L4 (mtDNA), a human mitochondrial DNA haplogroup
- Ribosomal protein L4, a human gene
- L4, a lumbar vertebra of the vertebral column, in human anatomy
- The fourth and last larval stage in the Caenorhabditis elegans worm development

== Other uses ==
- L4, a modern version of the Bren light machine gun in the British Army
- ISO/IEC 8859-4 (Latin-4), an 8-bit character encoding

== See also ==
- L04 (disambiguation)
- Level 4 (disambiguation)
- 4L (disambiguation)
- LIV (disambiguation)
