= HMS Lookout (1914) =

British destroyer

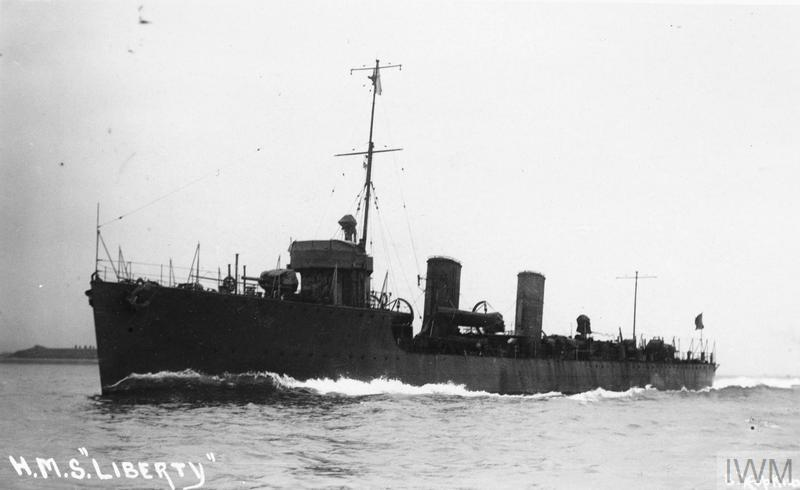
- Sister ship Liberty

History

United Kingdom
- Name: HMS Lookout
- Builder: Thornycroft, Woolston
- Laid down: 29 August 1912
- Launched: 27 April 1914
- Completed: August 1914
- Out of service: 24 August 1922
- Fate: Sold to be broken up

General characteristics (as built)
- Class & type: Laforey-class destroyer
- Displacement: 965 long tons (980 t) (normal); 1,150 long tons (1,170 t) (deep load)
- Length: 268 ft 8 in (81.9 m) (o/a)
- Beam: 27 ft 8 in (8.4 m)
- Draught: 10 ft 6 in (3.2 m)
- Installed power: 4 Yarrow boilers, 24,500 shp (18,300 kW)
- Propulsion: Parsons steam turbines, 2 shafts
- Speed: 29 knots (33.4 mph; 53.7 km/h)
- Range: 1,720 nmi (3,190 km) at 15 kn (28 km/h)
- Complement: 74
- Armament: 3 × single QF 4-inch (102 mm) Mark IV guns; 1 × single 7.7 mm (0.3 in) Maxim gun; 2 × twin 21 in (533 mm) torpedo tubes

HMS Lookout was a Laforey-class destroyer that served with the Royal Navy during the First World War. Laid down in 1912 as HMS Dragon, the ship was renamed in 1913 under an Admiralty order to become one of the first alphabetical class destroyers. Launched in 1914, Lookout joined the Harwich Force and participated in the Battle of Heligoland Bight, attacking the German light cruiser Strassburg with torpedoes, and the Battle of Dogger Bank. For much of the war, the ship acted as an escort for a wide range of ships, including the troopships carrying soldiers to serve in the Gallipoli campaign and the seaplane carriers Riviera and Vindex during an attack on the Zeppelin hangars at Zeebrugge. From 1917, the destroyer served as an escort to convoys of merchant ships. At the end of the war, the warship was placed in reserve. Although subsequently offered for sale to the Finnish Navy, Lookout was instead withdrawn from service and sold to be broken up in 1922.

== Design and development ==
Lookout was one of twenty two L- or Laforey-class destroyers built for the Royal Navy. The design followed the preceding Acasta class but with improved seakeeping properties and armament, including twice the number of torpedo tubes.

The destroyer had a length overall of 268 feet 8 inches (81.9 m), a beam of 27 feet 8 inches (8.4 m) and a draught of 10 feet 6 inches (3.2 m). Displacement was 965 long tons (980 t) normal and 1,150 long tons (1,170 t) deep load. Power was provided by four Yarrow boilers feeding two Parsons steam turbines rated at 24,500 shaft horsepower (18,300 kW) and driving two shafts, to give a design speed of 29 knots (33.4 mph; 53.7 km/h). Three funnels were fitted. The ship normally carried a maximum of 135 long tons (137 t) of oil, which gave a design range of 1,720 nautical miles (3,190 km; 1,980 mi) at 15 knots (28 km/h; 17 mph), but this could be increased to 205 long tons (208 t) in times of peace. The ship's complement was 74 officers and ratings.

Armament consisted of three QF 4 in (102 mm) Mk IV guns on the ship's centreline, with one on the forecastle, one aft and one between the funnels. The guns could fire a shell weighing 31 pounds (14 kg) at a muzzle velocity of 2,177 feet per second (664 m/s). One single 7.7 mm (0.3 in) Maxim gun was carried. A single 2-pounder 40 mm (2 in) "pom-pom" anti-aircraft gun was later added. Torpedo armament consisted of two twin mounts for 21 in (533 mm) torpedoes mounted aft. Capacity to lay four Vickers Elia Mk.4 mines was included, but the facility was never used.

== Construction and career ==
Dragon was ordered by the British Admiralty under the 1912–1913 Programme. The ship was laid down by John I. Thornycroft & Company at Woolston, Southampton on 29 August 1912. It was the fourteenth time that the name Dragon had been used by the Royal Navy, and the second destroyer that had received the name. The ship was renamed Lookout by Admiralty order on 30 September 1913, joining what was to be the first class that were all received names that started with the same letter of the alphabet. This was a convention that was subsequently used for destroyer classes until after the Second World War. It was the first time that the name had been used by the Royal Navy.

Lookout was launched on 27 April 1914 and completed in August. On commissioning, Lookout joined the Third Destroyer Flotilla as part of the Harwich Force. Almost immediately, as Britain had entered the First World War on 4 August, on 28 August, the destroyer took part in the Battle of Heligoland Bight. Lookout joined with the rest of the flotilla, led by the scout cruiser Fearless, in attacking German torpedo boats until the light cruiser Stettin appeared to rescue them. The cruiser was soon joined by two other light cruisers, Cöln and Strassburg. Lookout led the flotilla to attack Strassburg and succeeded in driving the larger ship away. The destroyer launched two torpedoes at the cruiser, but reported no hits.

On 24 January 1915, Lookout led the first division of the Third Destroyer Flotilla in the Battle of Dogger Bank. The destroyer took little part in the action, with the four faster M-class destroyers taking the lead. The warship was then refitted at Chatham Dockyard, but returned to service on 17 March. The destroyer rejoined the Harwich Force, but this time as part of the Ninth Destroyer Flotilla, and spent the remainder of the year undertaking the varied tasks typical of a destroyer's service at the time. For example, on 18 March, the destroyer joined the escort for the troopships taking the 29th Division to serve in the Gallipoli campaign. On 1 June, the ship was escorting a minesweeper force under the command of the light cruiser Arethusa when the force was spotted by Zeppelin LZ 24. The airship called out a seaplane, which dropped bombs on the warships without damage, the aircraft escaping before the ships' anti-aircraft guns could start firing. On 16 August, the destroyer formed part of the escort for the Second Light Cruiser Squadron, which was itself protecting the minelayer Princess Margaret on a mission to lay a minefield in the North Sea. The deployment led to the capture of two German trawlers that were observing the operation. Seven days later, the destroyer bombarded the U-boat sheds in Zeebrugge.

The following year was similarly full of diverse operations. On 20 March, Lookout was part of a flotilla supporting an attack from the air on the Zeppelin hangars in Zeebrugge from the seaplane carriers Riviera and Vindex. On the return journey, the flotilla was attacked by three German destroyers, but Lookout received no hits and all the ships returned to base without loss. On 24 April, the destroyer was part of the flotilla sent out to attack the German battlecruisers bombarding Lowestoft and Yarmouth. The flotilla attacked the German ships the next day; Lookout again took a peripheral role in the action and remaining unscathed.

To combat the increasingly successful German U-boats, the Royal Navy looked to introduce convoys of merchant ships protected by warships. After some initial success in the North Sea in March, April and May 1917, it was decided to extend the programme to the Atlantic Ocean. Lookout had by this time moved to the Fourth Destroyer Flotilla based at Devonport. The destroyer was allocated to escort the convoys to Sandown Bay, along with sister ships Leonidas and Liberty. The first of these new convoys left on 24 May, and, of the 71 ships sailing over the next month, only one was torpedoed and none were sunk. The success of the trial led to the widespread use of convoys for the remainder of the war. Many convoys passed without incident. However, on 7 July, when returning from convoy duty, Lookout spotted the German submarine UB-61 and attacked with depth charges. No hits were recorded. The destroyer remained with the Fourth Destroyer Flotilla at Devonport into the following year.

After the Armistice of 11 November 1918 that ended the war, the Royal Navy returned to a peacetime level of strength and both the number of ships and personnel needed to be reduced to save money. Lookout was initially placed in reserve at Portsmouth alongside fifty other destroyers. The destroyer was subsequently offered for sale to the Finnish Navy but the purchase was halted by the provisions of the Washington Naval Treaty which denied the sale of superfluous warships by the signatories and instead required the excess destroyers scrapped. Lookout was retired and, on 24 August 1922, sold to Hayes of Porthcawl to be broken up.

== Pennant numbers ==
Pennant number	Date
H24	December 1914
H62	January 1918
G97	January 1919
