= Liiva =

Liiva may refer to several places in Estonia:

- Liiva, Tallinn, subdistrict of Tallinn
- Liiva, Kose Parish, village in Kose Parish, Harju County
- Liiva, Pärnu County, village in Pärnu City, Pärnu County
- Liiva, Muhu Parish, village in Muhu Parish, Saare County
- Liiva, Saaremaa Parish, village in Saaremaa Parish, Saare County
- Liiva, Võru County, village in Sõmerpalu Parish, Võru County

Places formerly known as Liiva

- Aidu-Liiva, village in Lüganuse Parish, Ida-Viru County
- Erra-Liiva, village in Lüganuse Parish, Ida-Viru County
- Kaali-Liiva (formerly Liiva), village in Saaremaa Parish, Saare County
- Kalevi-Liiva, place in Jõelähtme Parish, Harju County
- Kihelkonna-Liiva (formerly Liiva), village in Saaremaa Parish, Saare County
- Laugu-Liiva (formerly Liiva), village in Saaremaa Parish, Saare County
- Liivaranna (formerly Liiva), village in Saaremaa Parish, Saare County

People

It is also an Estonian surname:

- Johan Liiva (born 1970), Swedish heavy metal musician of Estonian descent
- Silvi Liiva (1941–2023), Estonian printmaker

== See also ==
- Liiv, a surname
