= Oliva (disambiguation) =

Oliva is a town in Spain.

Oliva may also refer to:

== Places ==
- Oliva de Plasencia, municipality in Spain
- Oliva de Mérida, municipality in Spain
- Oliva de la Frontera, municipality in Spain
- Oliva, Córdoba, town in Argentina
- Oliva Gessi, commune in Italy
- Villa Oliva, village in Paraguay
- La Oliva, Fuerteventura, Spain
- Santa María de la Oliva, monastery in Navarre
- German and Latin name for Oliwa, Poland

== People ==
- Oliva (surname)
- Oliva (singer) (Alejandra Lozano Castellote, born March 20, 1989), Colombian singer, songwriter, and businesswoman
- Oliva of Brescia (died 138), saint
- Abbot Oliva (971–1046), Count of Berga
- Christian of Oliva (fl. 1180–1245), first Bishop of Prussia
- Oliva Sabuco (1562 – c. 1646), Spanish writer

== Other ==
- Oliva Cigar Co., a brand of handmade cigars
- Oliva (gastropod), a genus of marine gastropods
- FV Oliva, a German fishing trawler launched in 1920 and renamed in that year
- MS Oliva, a bulk carrier wrecked in 2011

== See also ==
- Olivary body
- Oliwa (disambiguation)
