= LIV =

LIV or Liv may refer to:

== People ==
- Liv (given name), a given name
- Liv (surname), list of people with the surname Liv
- Liv Morgan, a professional wrestler
- Liv, a person who speaks the Livonian language of Latvia
- Titus Livius, a Roman historian

== Places ==
- Liv Glacier, Antarctic glacier from Barnum Peak and draining north
- Liverpool Lime Street railway station, England (station code LIV)

== Groups, companies, organizations, brands ==
- Liv (band), a Swedish/American indie pop group
- Liv (TV channel), a Finnish TV channel
- Investigation Discovery (Latin America), a TV channel, formerly "Liv"
- Law Institute of Victoria, Australia
- LIV Golf, a professional golf tour
- LIV (nightclub), a nightclub at the Fontainebleau hotels in Miami and Las Vegas
- Liv Bicycles, a sub-brand of Giant Bicycles, designed specially for women
- Sony Liv, an Indian television network

== Arts and entertainment ==
- Liv (Livingston Taylor album), 1971
- Liv (Waltons album), 2001
- Liv (film), a 1967 Norwegian film by Pål Løkkeberg

== Other ==
- 54 (number) in Roman numerals
- Left innominate vein in the upper chest
- Lexikon der indogermanischen Verben ("Lexicon of the Indo-European Verbs")
- Line-item veto in law-making
- Wilder's law of initial value in statistics
- LiV DASH, a lithium-ion battery powered vehicle made by Hybrid Technologies
- Low information voter
- Livonian language (ISO 639-3 language code liv) of Latvia

== See also ==
- Liiv
- Olivia (disambiguation)
- 54 (disambiguation) ("LIV" in Roman numerals)
- LIV (disambiguation) (L4)
