= Bailamos (disambiguation) =

"Bailamos" is a 1999 song by Enrique Iglesias.

Bailamos may also refer to:

- "Bailamos", a 2015 song by Aleksander Vinter
- "Bailamos", a 2006 song by Fergie, for the film Poseidon
- "Bailamos", a 2021 song by Lucenzo
- "Bailamos", a 1999 song by M3 (band)
- "Bailamos", a 2021 song by Oliva (singer)
- ¡Bailamos!, an arts education program by Ensemble Español Spanish Dance Theater in Chicago, U.S.
- ¿Bailamos?, a 2015 Spanish TV programme presented by Toñi Moreno
- Bailamos, a habanera composition by María Enma Botet Dubois
