= 54th Army =

54th Army or Fifty-Fourth Army may refer to:

- 54th Group Army, former name of the 83rd Group Army of China
- Fifty-Fourth Army (Japan)
- 54th Army (Soviet Union)
- 54th Air Army, Soviet Union

== See also ==
- List of armies by number
- 54th Division (disambiguation)
- 54th Brigade (disambiguation)
- 54th Regiment (disambiguation)
- 54th Squadron (disambiguation)
- 54th (disambiguation)
