= Carlos Enrique Díaz de León =

Guatemalan military officer

Colonel Carlos Enrique Díaz de León
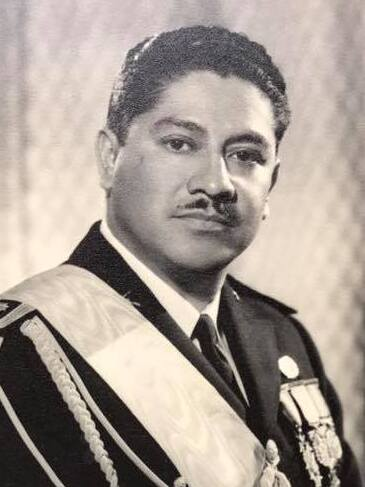
- Portrait, c.1954

Provisional President of Guatemala
- In office 27 June 1954 – 29 June 1954
- Preceded by: Jacobo Árbenz
- Succeeded by: Elfegio Monzón

Personal details
- Party: Military
- Occupation: Military general

Carlos Enrique Díaz de León was the provisional President of Guatemala from 27 June to 29 June 1954. He was replaced by a military junta led by Elfego Monzón. Carlos Enrique Díaz was previously Chief of the Guatemalan Armed Forces under President Jacobo Árbenz.

== Early career ==
Díaz had befriended Árbenz while they were both at the military academy. Díaz served in the Guatemalan army and eventually attained the rank of Colonel. Árbenz and Díaz remained friends after Árbenz became president in 1951, and served as his chief of armed forces. In 1954, the CIA intensified operations against the Árbenz government. During this phase, an attempt was made to bribe Díaz: he was offered 200,000 US dollars to act against Árbenz. He refused, possibly because the offer was made when he was visiting Caracas with his mistress.

== 1954 Guatemalan coup ==
On 18 June 1954, Carlos Castillo Armas led an invasion of Guatemala with a small force of Guatemalan exiles, as part of the US Central Intelligence Agency's "Operation PBSUCESS" to overthrow Árbenz. The invasion was accompanied by an intense campaign of psychological warfare presenting Castillo Armas' victory as a fait accompli, with the intent of forcing Árbenz to resign. Árbenz' initial intention was to repel an invasion force led by Carlos Castillo Armas by arming the military-age populace, the workers' militia, and the Guatemalan Army. However, Díaz, as chief of the Guatemalan armed forces, informed Árbenz that arming the civilians would be unpopular within the army, and that "the army [would] do its duty."

Due to this advice, Árbenz instead asked Díaz to select officers to lead a counter-attack. Díaz selected a corps of officers known to be men of personal integrity and who were loyal to the president. Árbenz also tried to use diplomatic methods to put an end to the invasion. Outside Zacapa, a small garrison of 30 Guatemalan soldiers defeated a rebel force of 180, making Árbenz believe that a military victory was possible. In reality, however, the threat of a US intervention and the psychological warfare employed by the CIA had left the army demoralized, and unwilling to fight. Árbenz was informed of the unwillingness of the army to fight by various means, and on 25 June decided to arm the civilian population of the capital. Díaz agreed to cooperate, along with several union leaders, but no volunteers appeared to take up arms. Seeing this, Díaz backed out of his agreement and began to confer with other military leaders, including Elfego Monzón and Jose Angel Sanchez, about seizing power. On 26 June, Díaz told Árbenz that he had tried to distribute weapons, but that he did not have the cooperation of troop leaders. The plotters spoke to US ambassador John Peurifoy, who agreed to contact Castillo Armas to arrange a cessation of hostilities: Díaz and his allies were unwilling to deal with Castillo Armas themselves. Peurifoy learned from them that they were planning on seizing power on 27 June.

== Presidency ==
On 27 June 1954, Jacobo Árbenz met with Díaz, and informed him that he was resigning. Historians have variously suggested either that, at the urging of Peurifoy, Díaz actually persuaded Árbenz to resign, or that Díaz delivered Árbenz an ultimatum from senior army officers, demanding that he resign. Historian Jim Handy has stated that Árbenz made Díaz promise to protect the reforms of the Guatemalan Revolution; nonetheless, his resignation represented the end of the revolution for practical purposes. Árbenz left office at 8 PM, after recording a resignation speech that was broadcast on the radio an hour later. Immediately afterwards, Díaz made an announcement that he would be taking over the presidency in the name of the Guatemalan Revolution, and stated that the Guatemalan army would still fight against Castillo Armas' invasion. Nonetheless, Díaz also ordered operations against known communists even before he formally took power. The military junta, which took over consisted of Carlos Enrique Díaz, Colonel H. Elfego Monzón, and Colonel Jose Angel Sánchez.

US ambassador John Peurifoy had encouraged Díaz to accept Árbenz' resignation, and had promised to contact Castillo Armas to arrange a ceasefire once Árbenz had resigned. However, he had not expected Díaz, who still supported the Guatemalan Revolution, to form a military junta and keep fighting. This action had made him a target of Allen Dulles, director of the CIA, and John Foster Dulles, the US secretary of state, who decided that they needed a "better" army officer as president.

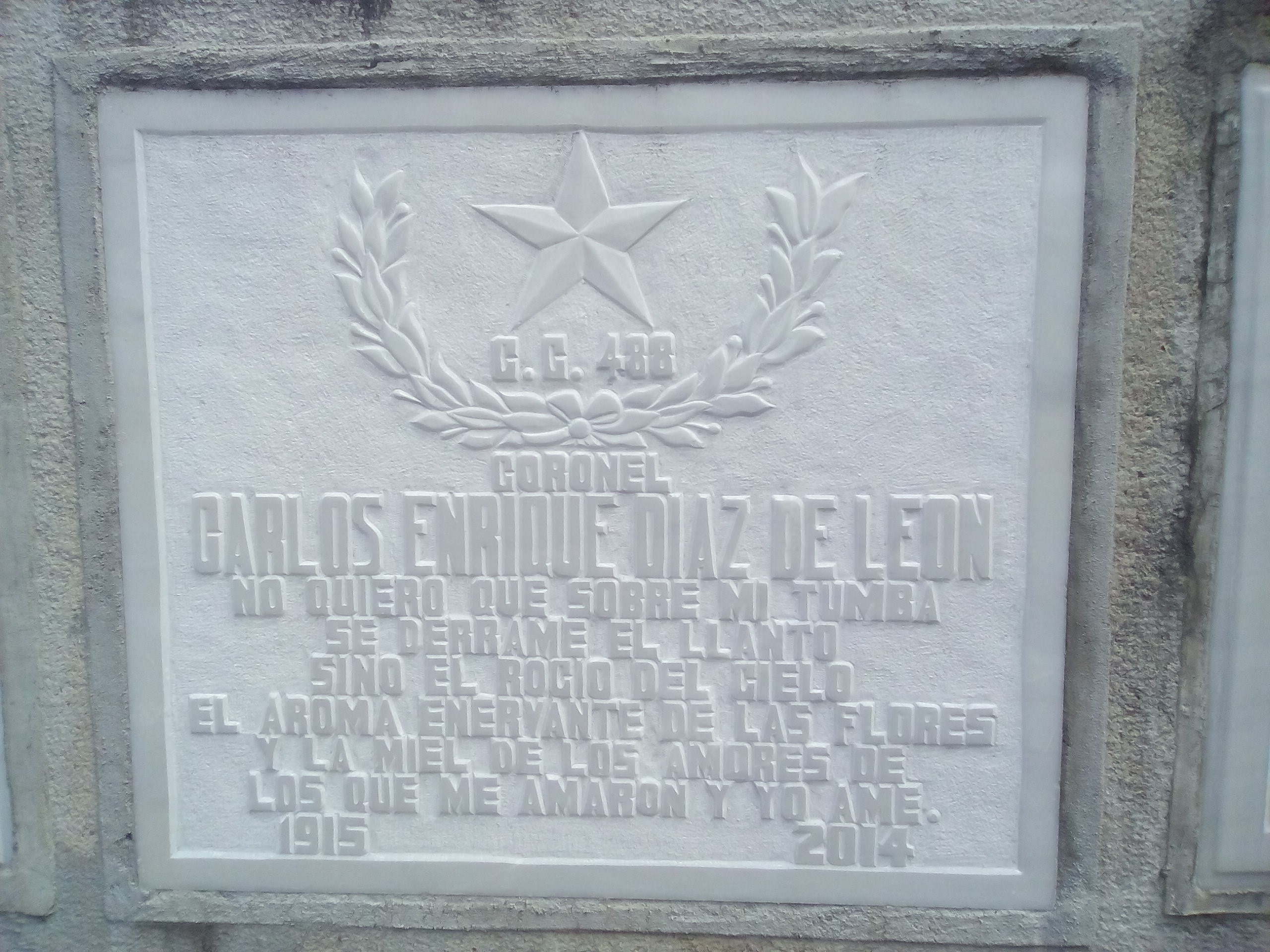
Tomb of Carlos Enrique Díaz de León

A few hours later, Peurifoy, who had played a role in the organization of the coup, informed Díaz that he would have to resign; according to the CIA officer who spoke to Díaz, this was because he was "not convenient for American foreign policy." Witnesses later stated that Díaz' removal took place at 4 AM in Díaz' home. According to eyewitnesses, Peurifoy wore a shoulder-holster to the meeting, as was his wont at the time. Peurifoy harshly criticized Díaz for letting Árbenz criticize the United States in his resignation speech. At the same time, a U.S.-trained pilot bombed the Guatemalan army's main powder magazine to try to intimidate Díaz. Díaz said much later that Peurifoy had given him a list of names, claiming that the people on it were all communists, and demanded that all of them be shot by the next day. Díaz said that he had refused and that this had further antagonized Peurifoy. After being berated at the meeting, he told Peurifoy that he would resign, and that he and Sanchez would withdraw from the junta. Monzón then entered and announced that he was forming the new junta. The other members of Monzón's junta were José Luis Cruz Salazar and Mauricio Dubois. Life magazine described Monzón as having "a more impressive anti-Communist record" than Díaz.

== Sources ==
- Cullather, Nicholas (2006). Secret History: The CIA's classified account of its operations in Guatemala, 1952–1954. Palo Alto: Stanford University Press. ISBN 978-0-8047-5468-2.
- Gleijeses, Piero (1992). Shattered Hope: The Guatemalan Revolution and the United States, 1944–1954. Princeton University Press. ISBN 978-0-691-02556-8.
- Immerman, Richard H. (1982). The CIA in Guatemala: The Foreign Policy of Intervention. Austin: University of Texas Press.
- McCleary, Rachel M. (1999). Dictating Democracy: Guatemala and the End of Violent Revolution. University Press of Florida. ISBN 978-0-8130-1726-6.
- Schlesinger, Stephen; Kinzer, Stephen (1999). Bitter Fruit: The Story of the American Coup in Guatemala. David Rockefeller Center series on Latin American studies, Harvard University. ISBN 978-0-674-01930-0.

Political offices
Preceded by Jacobo Árbenz	President of Guatemala; 1954	Succeeded by Elfego Monzón (Military Junta)
