= 4L =

4L or 4-L can refer to:

- 4L, another name for Renault 4
- 4L is the fourth and final year of a law student in Tanzania, Kenya and Uganda.
- 4L Trophy
- Curtiss R-4L, model of Curtiss Model R
- ORC4L
- Proje 4L, see Proje4L / Elgiz Museum of Contemporary Art
- British Rail Class 202 Diesel-electric multiple units (6L) when reduced to a four-carriage configuration.
- 4L (band), South Korean girl group
- 4L, 2021 mixtape by Yeat
- 4L, the production code for the 1976 Doctor Who serial The Seeds of Doom
- Loyal Legion of Loggers and Lumbermen, an American company union founded in 1917
- 4L (film), 2019 Spanish film

== See also ==
- L4 (disambiguation)
