= Liiv =

Family name

Liiv is a common Estonian surname (meaning sand), with notable bearers including:

- Daimar Liiv (born 1966), politician
- Heino Liiv (1930–2021), linguist and philologist
- Jakob Liiv (1859–1938), poet and writer
- Juhan Liiv (1864–1913), poet
- Marten Liiv (born 1996), speed skater
- Toomas Liiv (1946–2009), poet and literary critic
- Urmas Eero Liiv (born 1966), film and television director

== See also ==
- Liv (disambiguation)
- Liiva (disambiguation)
