= Elfego Hernán Monzón Aguirre =

Former military junta leader in Guatemala

27th President of Guatemala
- In office 29 June 1954 – 8 July 1954
- Chief Minister: Enrique Trinidad Oliva
- Preceded by: Carlos Enrique Díaz de León
- Succeeded by: Carlos Castillo Armas

Personal details
- Born: 5 May 1912; Barberena, Santa Rosa, Guatemala
- Died: 6 June 1981 (aged 69); Guatemala City, Guatemala
- Occupation: Military

Elfego Hernán Monzón Aguirre (5 May 1912 – 6 June 1981) was a Guatemalan army officer who was President of Guatemala and leader of a military junta from 29 June 1954 to 8 July 1954, during the 1954 Guatemalan coup d'état.

== Early career ==
Monzón was an officer in the Guatemalan military, eventually attaining the rank of Colonel. He also served in the cabinet of Guatemalan President Jacobo Árbenz (in office from 1951 to 1954). Historian Jim Handy described him in 1985 as "minister for government," while a U.S. government memorandum described him as a "minister without portfolio" on 14 January 1954. Sources within the U.S. embassy in Guatemala were reported to have said that Monzón had, in private conversations, expressed concerns over communist influence in Guatemala, after he had been approached with the suggestion that he led a coup against the government. Monzón stated that the army itself was anti-communist, but that conditions needed to worsen before the army would do anything. However, he anticipated that in a few months, the army would be willing to force Árbenz to resign, and he expressed hopes that other countries would place severe economic pressure on Guatemala. Monzón had heard of a coup attempt being planned, and was worried that it would lead to severe bloodshed. Tim Weiner, in his history of the Central Intelligence Agency (CIA), stated that Monzón had been bribed by CIA officer Henry Hecksher.

== Assumption of presidency ==
On 27 June 1954 Árbenz resigned as a result of a U.S. sponsored coup. Carlos Enrique Díaz replaced him as president, at the head of a military junta, which also included Monzón, and Jose Angel Sánchez. On 29 June Díaz was forced to resign, and a new three-person junta, headed by Monzón, took power. Witnesses later stated that Díaz' removal took place at 4 AM in Díaz' home. U.S. diplomat John Peurifoy, who had also played a role in the coup, had summoned all three members of the military junta there, and Díaz had announced that he was resigning after a meeting with Peurifoy and Sánchez. Monzón then entered and announced that he was forming the new junta. Historian Piero Gleijeses stated that Peurifoy was rough with Díaz at the meeting, berating him for allowing Árbenz to criticize the U.S. in his resignation speech. Díaz later stated that Peurifoy had presented him with a list of names, and demanded that all of them be shot by the next day, because they were communists; Díaz had refused, turning Peurifoy further against him. Gleijeses maintains that Peurifoy compelled Díaz to allow Monzón to become president, as Monzón was more staunchly anti-communist. The other members of Monzón's junta were José Luis Cruz Salazar and Mauricio Dubois. Life magazine described Monzón as having "a more impressive anti-Communist record" than Díaz.

== El Salvador negotiations ==
Monzón was a staunch anti-communist, and had spoken repeatedly of his loyalty to the U.S. Nonetheless, he was not initially willing to hand over power to Carlos Castillo Armas, the leader of the US-backed rebels in the coup against Árbenz. The US State Department persuaded Óscar Osorio, the dictator of El Salvador, to invite Monzón, Castillo Armas, and other significant individuals to participate in peace talks in San Salvador. Osorio agreed to do so, and after Díaz had been deposed, Monzón and Castillo Armas arrived in the Salvadoran capital on 30 June. Monzón encountered difficulties negotiating with Castillo Armas, who wished to incorporate some of his rebel forces into the Guatemalan military: Monzón, however, was reluctant to allow this. Castillo Armas also saw Monzón as having entered the fight against Árbenz late. The negotiations nearly broke down on the very first day, and so Peurifoy, who had remained in Guatemala City to give the impression that the US was not heavily involved with the negotiations, traveled to San Salvador. Allen Dulles, director of the CIA, later said that Peurifoy's role was to "crack some heads together." Peurifoy was able to force an agreement due to the fact that neither Monzón nor Castillo Armas could have become or remained president without the support of the US. The deal was announced at 4:45 am on 2 July, and under its terms, Castillo Armas and his subordinate Major Enrique Trinidad Oliva became members of the junta led by Monzón, although Monzón remaining president. On 8 July 1954 Castillo Armas replaced Monzón as president; Castillo Armas led a new five-person junta, of which Monzón remained a member. The settlement negotiated by Castilo Armas and Monzón also said that the five-man junta would rule for 15 days, during which a president would be chosen.

== Aftermath ==
Soon after Castillo Armas took the presidency, he faced a coup attempt from within the army. An article in Life magazine stated that Monzón's refusal to join the rebels proved to be the turning point of the revolt, and the attempt was crushed, leaving 29 dead and 91 wounded. Colonel Cruz Salazar and Colonel Dubois, who were seen as Monzón's supporters in the junta, had made a secret agreement with Castillo Armas without Monzon's knowledge, and resigned on 7 July. As a result, Monzon was outnumbered in the junta, and also resigned, on 1 September. This permitted Castillo Armas to be unanimously elected president of the junta. For their cooperation, Salazar and Dubois were paid 100,000 US dollars each. On 13 July, the new government was recognized by the US government. An election was organized in early October 1954, but all political parties were prohibited from participating in it. The only candidate was Carlos Castillo Armas, who won 99% of the vote. Monzón remained a part of Castillo Armas' administration.

== Death ==
On 6 June 1981, Elfego Hernan Monzon Aguirre died in Guatemala; he was 69 years old.

== Sources ==
- Gleijeses, Piero (1992). Shattered Hope: The Guatemalan Revolution and the United States, 1944–1954. Princeton University Press. ISBN 978-0-691-02556-8.
- Immerman, Richard H. (1982). The CIA in Guatemala: The Foreign Policy of Intervention. Austin: University of Texas Press.
- Schlesinger, Stephen; Kinzer, Stephen (1999). Bitter Fruit: The Story of the American Coup in Guatemala. David Rockefeller Center series on Latin American studies, Harvard University. ISBN 978-0-674-01930-0.

Political offices
Preceded by Carlos Enrique Díaz de León	President of Guatemala; 1954 (Military Junta)	Succeeded by Carlos Castillo (Military Junta)
