= Incendiary device =

Weapons intended to start fires

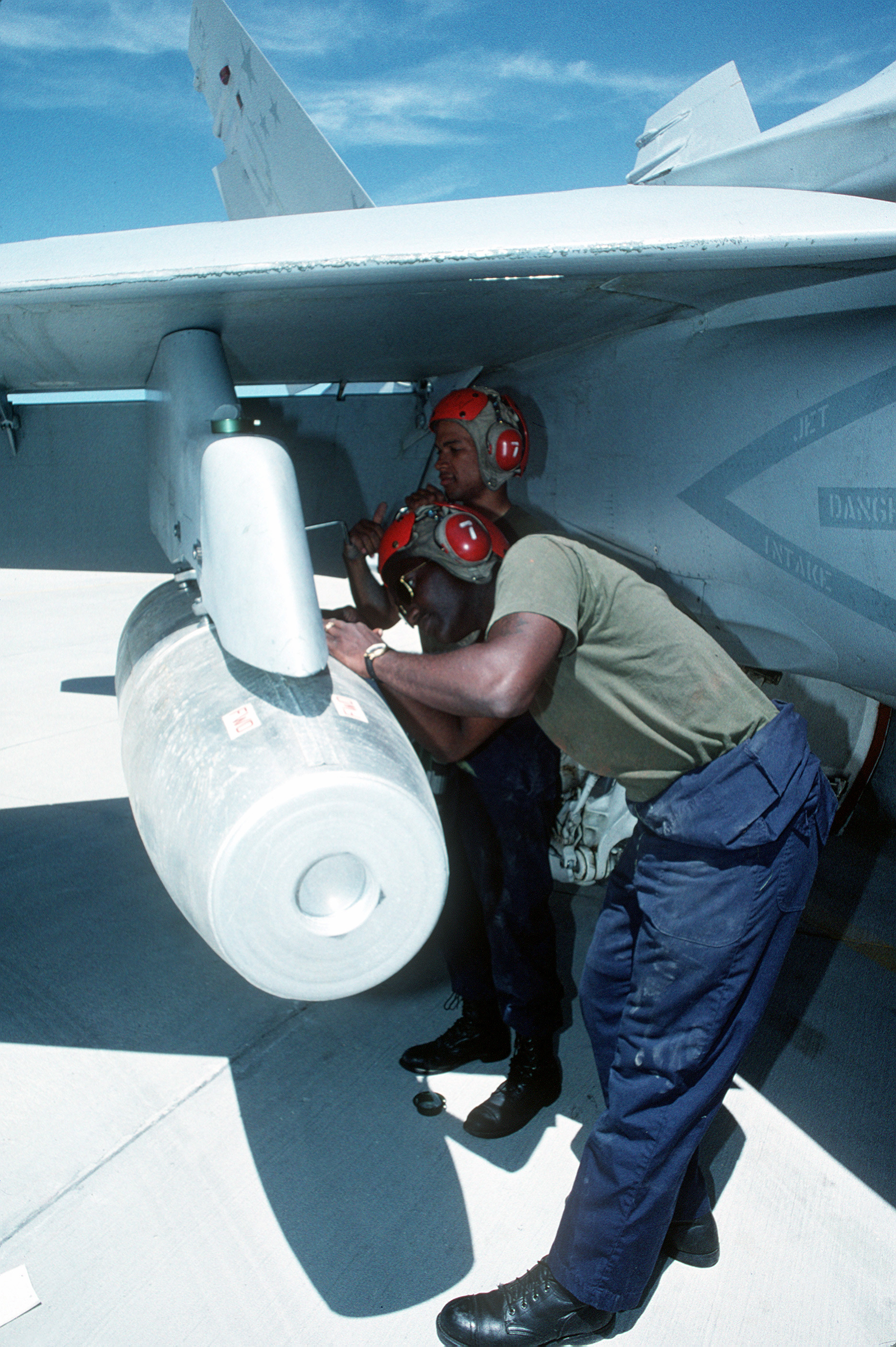
Loading a Mark 77 napalm bomb onto a US Marine Strike Fighter Squadron F/A-18A Hornet aircraft during a June 1993 training exercise

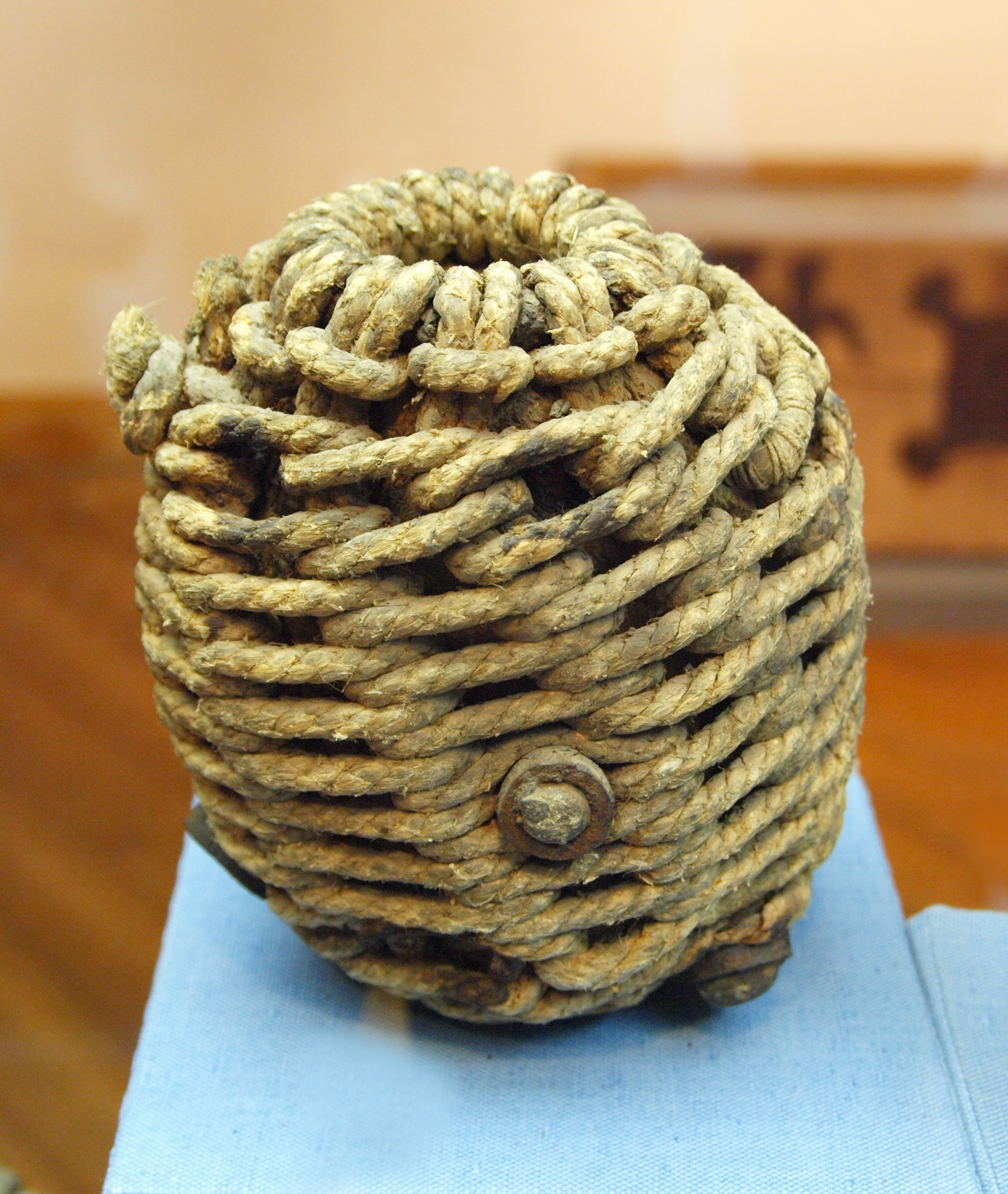
A 17th century fire or light ball from Veste Coburg, Germany

Incendiary weapons, incendiary devices, incendiary munitions, or incendiary bombs are weapons designed to start fires. They may destroy structures or sensitive equipment using fire, and sometimes operate as anti-personnel weaponry. Incendiaries utilize materials such as napalm, thermite, magnesium powder, chlorine trifluoride, thermobaric weapons, or white phosphorus. Though colloquially often called "bombs", they are not explosives but in fact operate to slow the process of chemical reactions and use ignition rather than detonation to start or maintain the reaction. Napalm, for example, is petroleum especially thickened with certain chemicals into a gel to slow, but not stop, combustion, releasing energy over a longer time than an explosive device. In the case of napalm, the gel adheres to surfaces and resists suppression.

== Pre-modern history ==
A range of early thermal weapons were utilized by ancient, medieval/post-classical and early modern armies, including hot pitch, oil, resin, animal fat and other similar compounds. Substances such as quicklime and sulfur could be toxic and blinding. Incendiary mixtures, such as the petroleum-based Greek fire, were launched by throwing machines or administered through a siphon. Sulfur- and oil-soaked materials were sometimes ignited and thrown at the enemy, or attached to spears, arrows or bolts, and fired by hand or machine. Some siege techniques—such as mining and boring—relied on combustibles and fire to complete the collapse of walls and structures.

Towards the latter part of the period, gunpowder was invented, which increased the sophistication of the weapons, starting with fire lances.

== Development and use in World War I ==
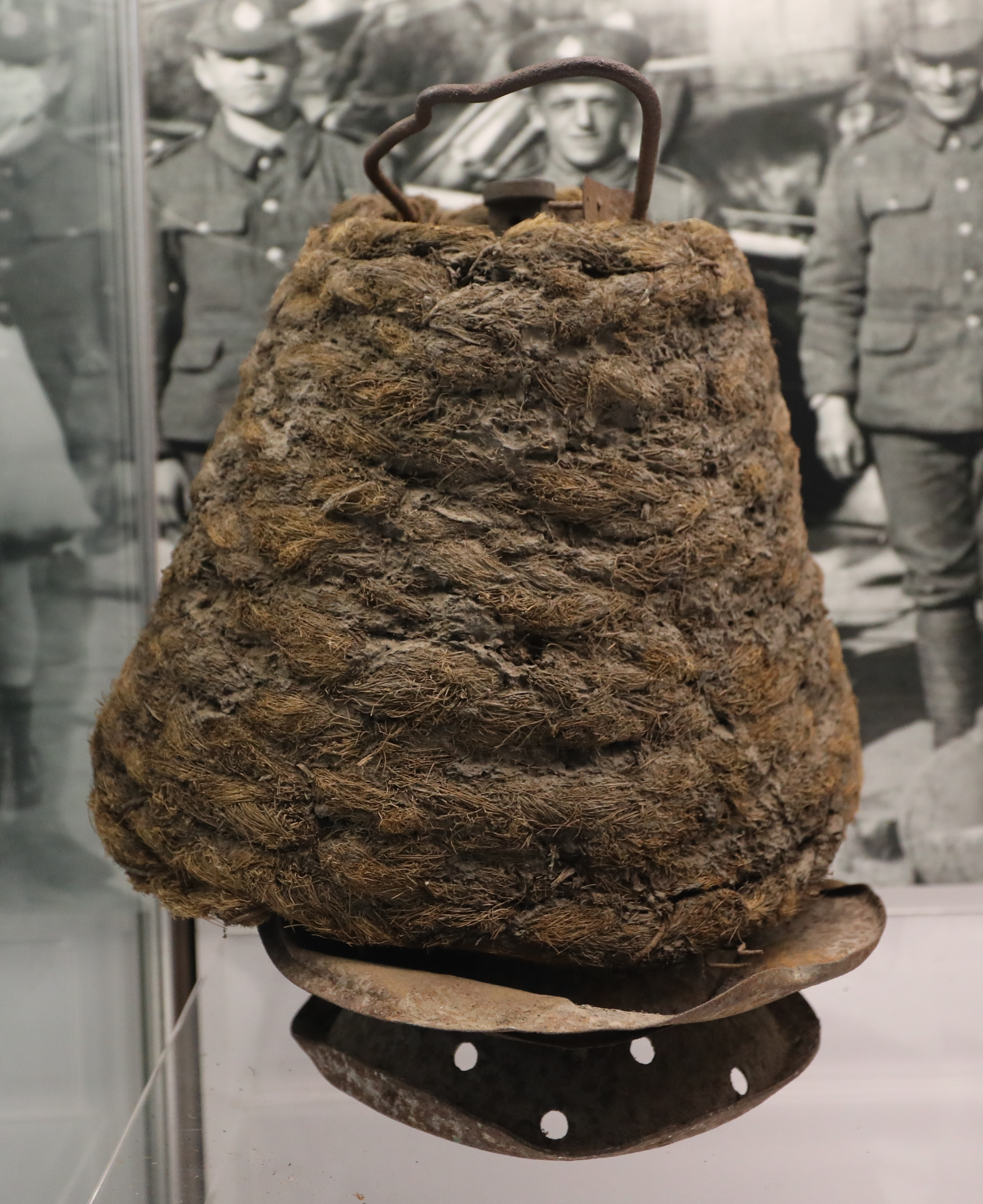
An incendiary bomb dropped on Southend-on-Sea in 1916

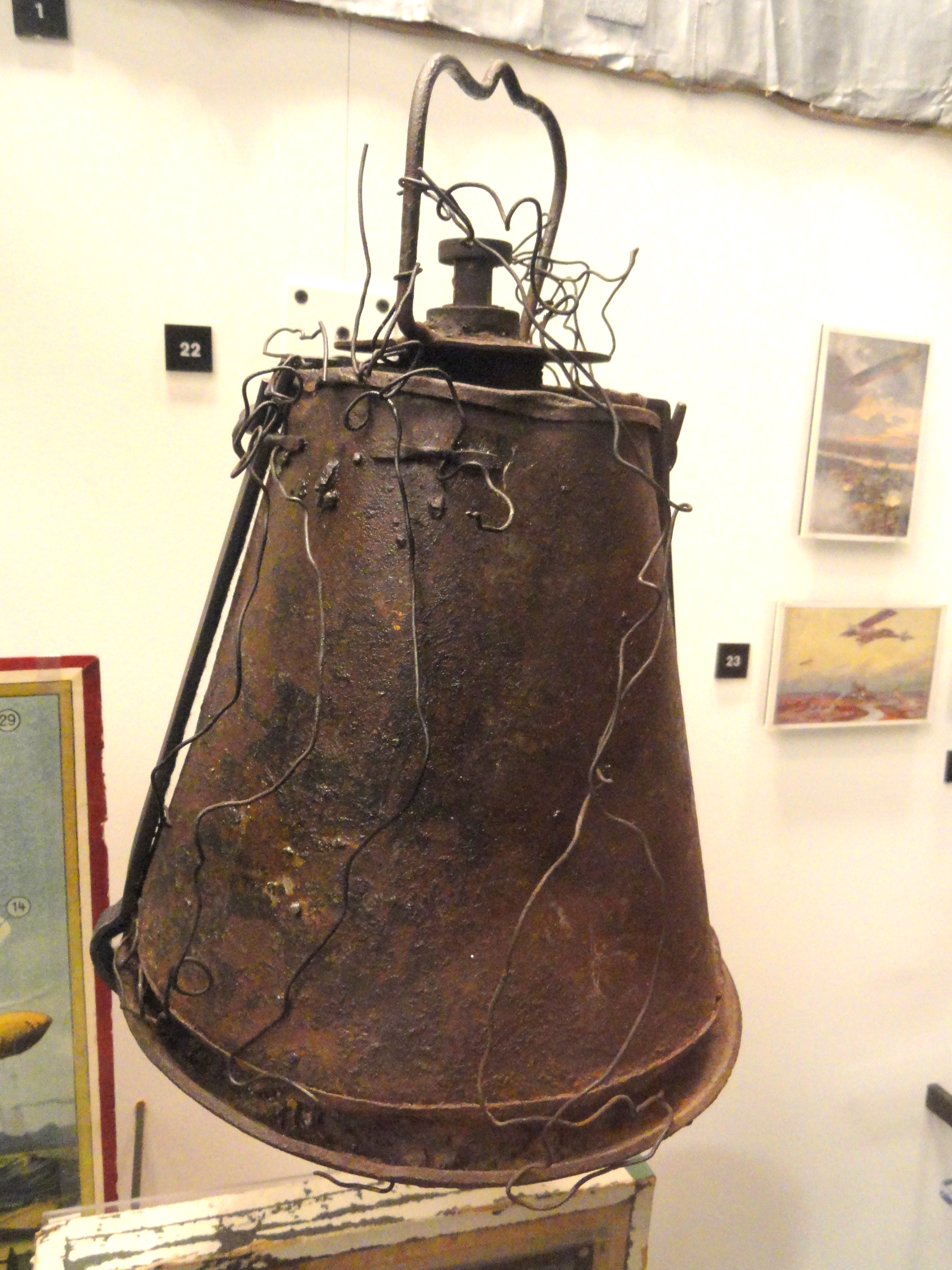
Remains of a metal canister from a thermite incendiary bomb dropped by a Zeppelin on London during World War I

The first incendiary devices to be dropped during World War I fell on coastal towns in Norfolk, England, on the night of 19–20 January 1915, during a raid by the Imperial German Navy Zeppelins L 3 and L 4. These German firebombs were smooth metal canisters packed with kerosene- or benzol-soaked rope, sealed in resin to form a hardened incendiary core. Dropped from Zeppelin airships during raids between 1915 and 1917, these devices were designed to ignite fires upon impact. While some later designs featured stabilizing fins, many incendiaries used in early attacks had smooth exteriors, with the rope wrapping giving them a ridged appearance.

The incendiary bomb's construction began with a hanger at the top, fitted with a cloth streamer to stabilize its descent. Beneath this was a metal cone supporting tightly wound coils of rope, reinforced with wire. A resinous material was poured over the rope and cone, forming a hardened outer casing once solidified. Inside, a central cylinder contained thermite—a pyrotechnic composition capable of reaching temperatures up to 5,000 °F (2,760 °C). The base of the bomb was a strong, saucer-shaped metal plate, pierced with air holes and designed to accommodate the lower end of the thermite cylinder.

One notable variant was the Goldschmidt Incendiary Bomb, named after Hans Goldschmidt, the inventor of thermite. This design measured approximately 50 cm in height and 18 cm in diameter, with a total weight of around 10 kg. It featured an inner metal cylinder filled with thermite, surrounded by a thin sheet metal container holding 3.5 litres of benzol. The outer shell was wrapped in tarred rope, which helped retain the benzol within the container and added to the bomb's flammability. This configuration enhanced the incendiary effect upon impact and was typical of the more destructive devices used in later Zeppelin raids.

On 8 September 1915, Zeppelin L 13 dropped a large number of firebombs during a raid on London. Although the devices were generally ineffective in terms of widespread destruction, the attack resulted in civilian casualties and had a significant psychological effect across England.

Following experiments with 5-litre barrels of benzol, the B-1E Elektron fire bomb (German: Elektronbrandbombe) was developed in 1918 by scientists and engineers at the Griesheim-Elektron chemical works. The bomb was ignited by a thermite charge, but the main incendiary effect was from the magnesium and aluminium alloy casing, which ignited at 650 °C (1,202 °F), sustained combustion at 1,100 °C (2,010 °F), and released vapour that burned at temperatures reaching 1,800 °C (3,270 °F). A further advantage of the alloy casing was its lightness—being a quarter of the density of steel—which enabled each bomber to carry a considerable number of bombs.

In the summer of 1918, the German High Command devised an operation called "The Fire Plan" (German: Der Feuerplan). It involved deploying the entire German heavy bomber fleet in successive waves over London and Paris, dropping as many incendiary bombs as possible until either the fleet was destroyed or the crews became too exhausted to continue flying. The objective was to engulf both capitals in an inextinguishable blaze, compelling the Allies to sue for peace. Thousands of Elektron bombs were stockpiled at forward bomber bases and the operation was scheduled for August and again in early September 1918. On both occasions, however, the order to take off was countermanded at the last moment, possibly due to fears of Allied reprisals against German cities.

Separately, a plan to firebomb New York with new long-range Zeppelins of the L 70 class was proposed by the naval airship fleet commander Peter Strasser in July 1918, but the proposal was vetoed by Admiral Reinhard Scheer, possibly due to concerns over strategic escalation or feasibility.

In contrast to German plans, the Royal Air Force had already deployed its own "Baby" Incendiary Bomb (BIB), which also contained a thermite charge.

== Development and use in World War II ==
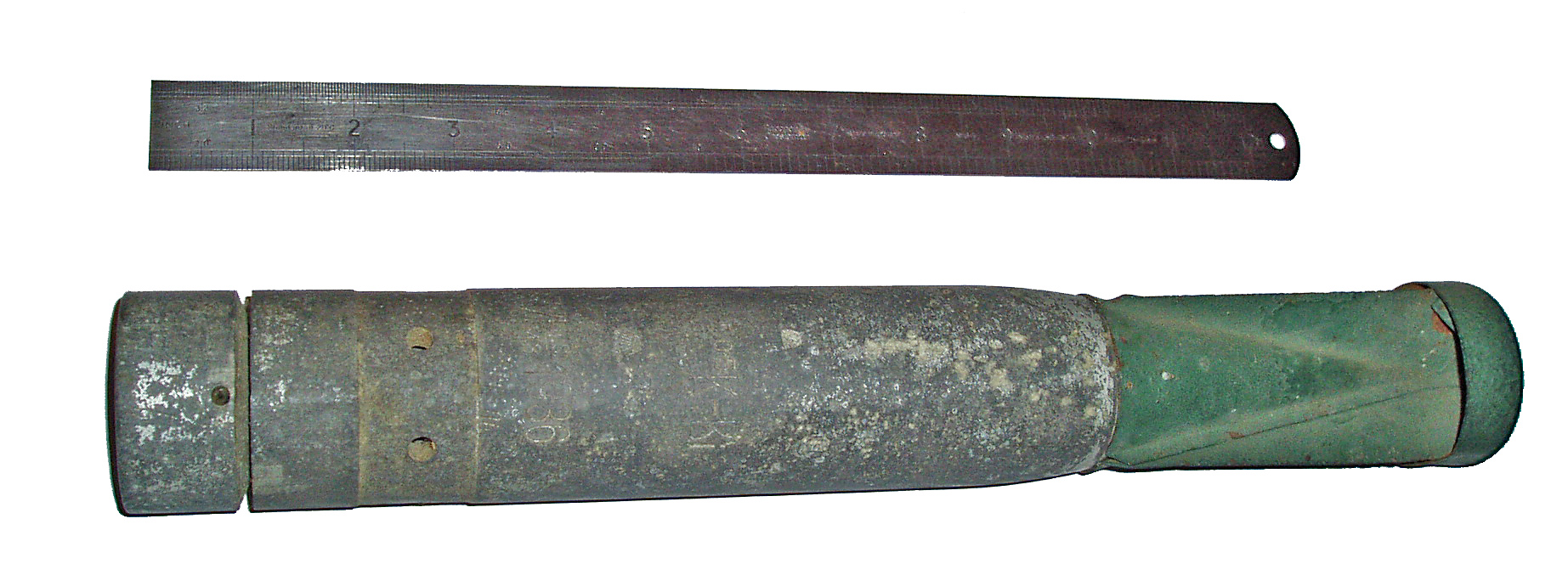
A German World War II 1 kg Elektron incendiary bomb

Incendiary bombs were used extensively in World War II as an effective bombing weapon, often in a conjunction with high-explosive bombs. Probably the most famous incendiary attacks are the bombing of Hamburg and the bombing of Tokyo on 10 March 1945. Many different configurations of incendiary bombs and a wide range of filling materials such as isobutyl methacrylate (IM) polymer, napalm, and similar jellied-petroleum formulas were used, many of them developed by the US Chemical Warfare Service. Different methods of delivery, e.g. small bombs, bomblet clusters and large bombs, were tested and implemented. For example, a large bomb casing was filled with small sticks of incendiary (bomblets); the casing was designed to open at altitude, scattering the bomblets in order to cover a wide area. An explosive charge would then ignite the incendiary material, often starting a raging fire. The fire would burn at extreme temperatures that could destroy most buildings made of wood or other combustible materials (buildings constructed of stone tend to resist incendiary destruction unless they are first blown open by high explosives).

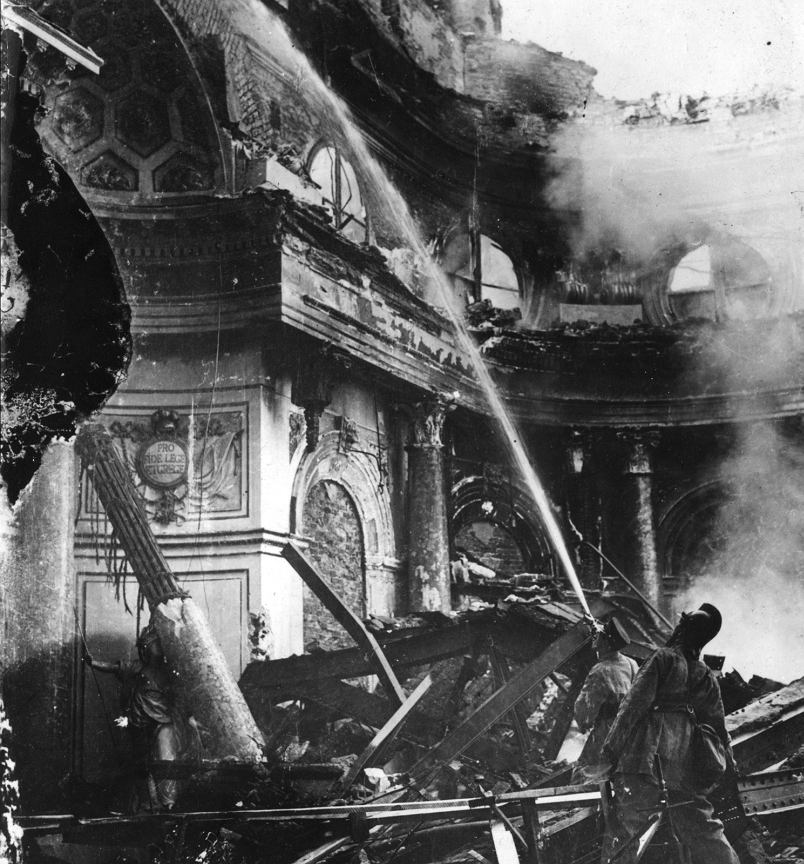
Burning ballroom at the Royal Castle, Warsaw, as a result of incendiary bombing by the German Luftwaffe

The German Luftwaffe started the war using the 1918-designed one-kilogram magnesium alloy B-1E Elektronbrandbombe; later modifications included the addition of a small explosive charge intended to penetrate the roof of any building which it landed on. Racks holding 36 of these bombs were developed, four of which could, in turn, be fitted to an electrically triggered dispenser so that a single He 111 bomber could carry 1,152 incendiary bombs, or more usually a mixed load. Less successful was the Flammenbombe, a 250 kg or 500 kg high explosive bomb case filled with an inflammable oil mixture, which often failed to detonate and was withdrawn in January 1941.

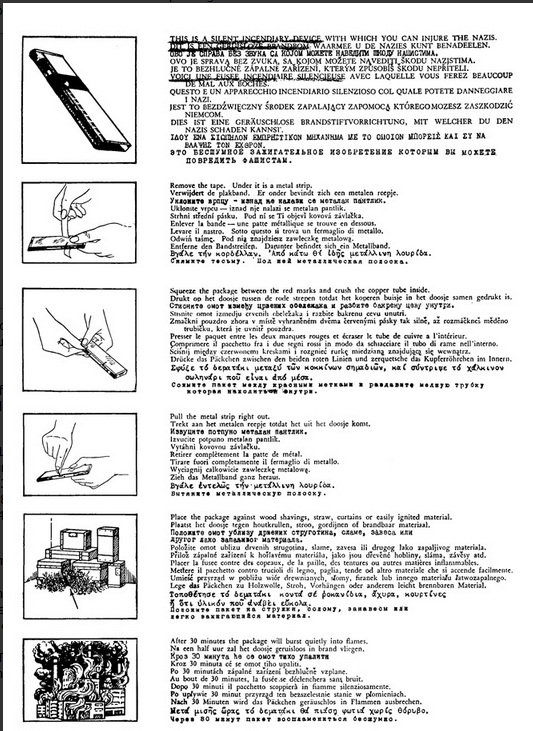
Operation Braddock time delay incendiary device manual.

In World War II, incendiaries were principally developed in order to destroy the many small, decentralised war industries located (often intentionally) throughout vast tracts of city land in an effort to escape destruction by conventionally aimed high-explosive bombs. Nevertheless, the civilian destruction caused by such weapons quickly earned them a reputation as terror weapons with the targeted populations. Nazi Germany began the campaign of incendiary bombings at the start of World War II with the bombing of Warsaw, and continued with the London Blitz and the bombing of Moscow, among other cities. Later, an extensive reprisal was enacted by the Allies in the strategic bombing campaign that led to the near-annihilation of many German cities. In the Pacific War, during the last seven months of strategic bombing by B-29 Superfortresses in the air war against Japan, a change to firebombing tactics resulted in the death of 500,000 Japanese and the homelessness of five million more. Sixty-seven Japanese cities lost significant areas to incendiary attacks. The most deadly single bombing raid in history was Operation Meetinghouse, an incendiary attack that killed some 100,000 Tokyo residents in one night.

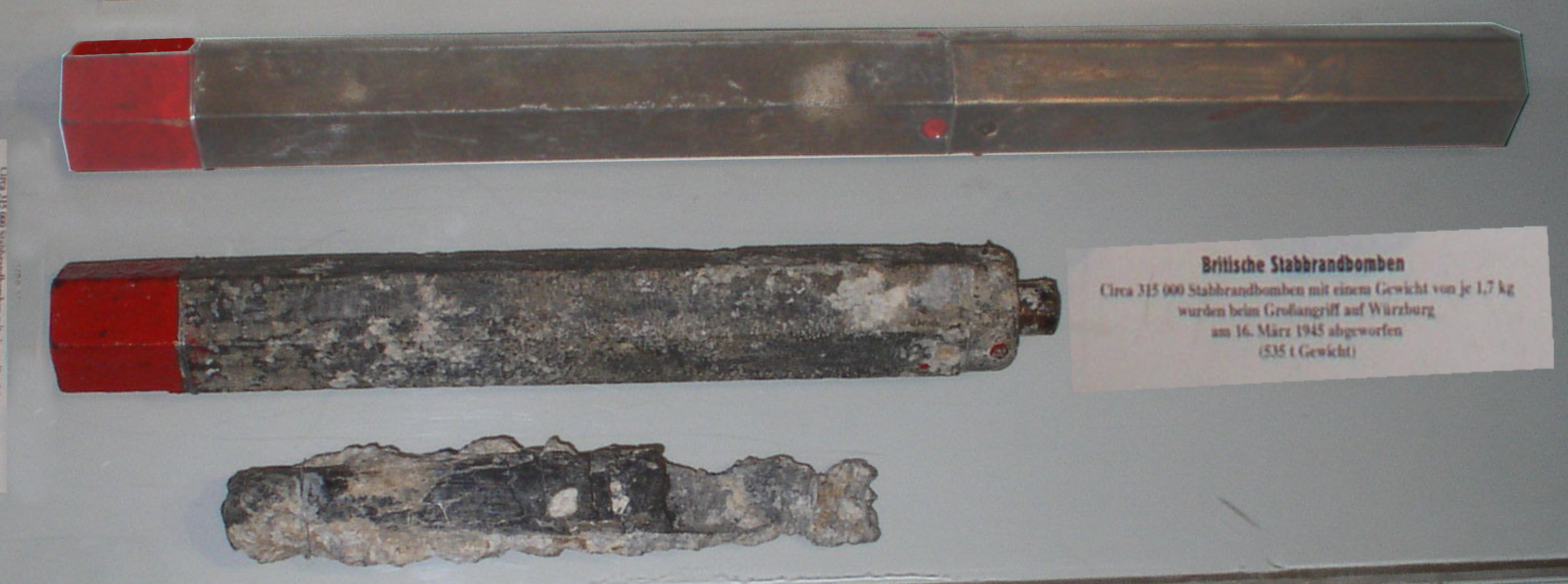
British I.B. 4-lb. Mk IV type incendiary bomb. Top: complete device, nose is red. Middle: dud found without the tin plate tail. Bottom: the remains after burning. RAF Bomber Command dropped 80 million of these 4 lb incendiary bombs during World War II. The 4 lb bomb was also used by the US as the "AN-M50".

The 4 lb (1.8 kg) incendiary bomb, developed by ICI, was the standard light incendiary bomb used by RAF Bomber Command in very large numbers, declining slightly in 1944 to 35.8 million bombs produced (the decline being due to more bombs arriving from the United States). It was the weapon of choice for the British "dehousing" plan. The bomb consisted of a hollow body made from aluminium-magnesium alloy with a cast iron/steel nose, and filled with thermite incendiary pellets. It was capable of burning for up to ten minutes. There was also a high explosive version and delayed high explosive versions (2–4 minutes) which were designed to kill rescuers and firefighters. It was normal for a proportion of high explosive bombs to be dropped during incendiary attacks in order to expose combustible material and to fill the streets with craters and rubble, hindering rescue services.

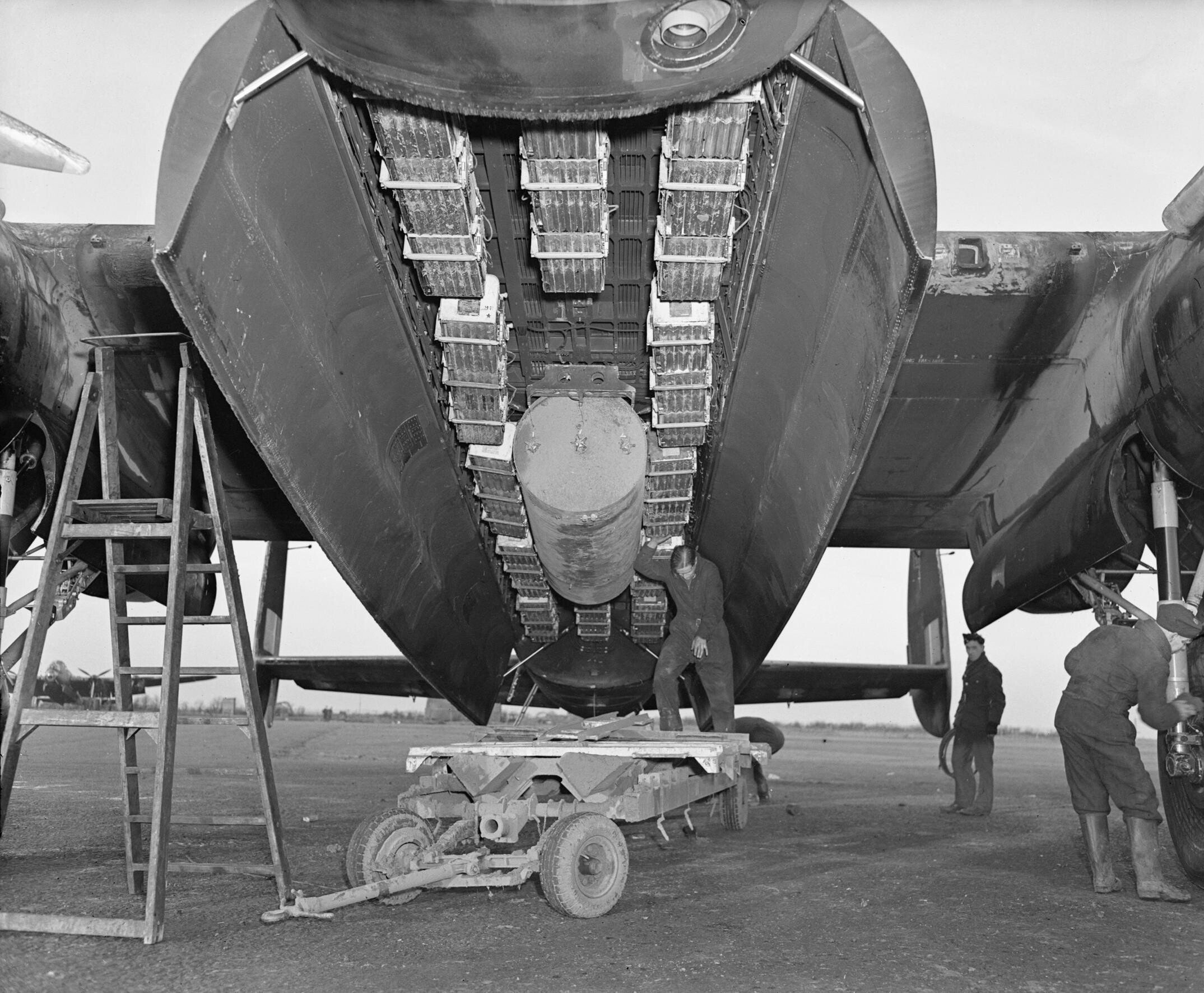
Avro Lancaster bomb bay showing later mix of 4,000-pound "Cookie" blast bomb and 12 small bomb containers each containing 236 4 lb incendiaries.

Towards the end of World War Two, the British introduced a much improved 30 lb (14 kg) incendiary bomb, whose fall was retarded by a small parachute and on impact sent out an extremely hot flame for 15 ft (4.6 m); This, the "Incendiary Bomb, 30-lb., Type J, Mk I", burned for approximately two minutes. Articles in late 1944 claimed that the flame was so hot it could crumble a brick wall. For propaganda purposes the RAF dubbed the new incendiary bomb the "Superflamer". Around fifty-five million incendiary bombs were dropped on Germany by Avro Lancasters alone.

Many incendiary weapons developed and deployed during World War II were in the form of bombs and shells whose main incendiary component is white phosphorus (WP), and can be used in an offensive anti-personnel role against enemy troop concentrations, but WP is also used for signalling, smoke screens, and target-marking purposes. The U.S. Army and Marines used WP extensively in World War II and Korea for all three purposes, frequently using WP shells in large 4.2-inch chemical mortars. WP was widely credited by many Allied soldiers for breaking up numerous German infantry attacks and creating havoc among enemy troop concentrations during the latter part of World War II. In both World War II and Korea, WP was found particularly useful in overcoming enemy human wave attacks.

== Incendiary weapons after World War II ==
Napalm was widely used by the US during the Korean War. Eighth Army chemical officer Donald Bode reported that on an "average good day" United Nations pilots used 70,000 US gallons (260,000 L) of napalm, with approximately 60,000 US gallons (230,000 L) of this thrown by US forces. British prime minister Winston Churchill privately criticized the use of napalm in Korea, writing that it was "very cruel," as US and UN forces, he wrote, were "splashing it all over the civilian population," "tortur[ing] great masses of people." He conveyed these sentiments to US Chairman of the Joint Chiefs of Staff Omar Bradley, who "never published the statement." Publicly, Churchill allowed Bradley "to issue a statement that confirmed U.K. support for U.S. napalm attacks."

During the Vietnam War, the US developed the CBU-55, a cluster bomb incendiary fueled by propane, a weapon that was used only once in warfare. Napalm however, became an intrinsic element of US military action during the Vietnam War as forces made increasing use of it for its tactical and psychological effects. Reportedly about 388,000 tons of US napalm bombs were dropped in the region between 1963 and 1973, compared to 32,357 tons used over three years in the Korean War, and 16,500 tons dropped on Japan in 1945.

Incendiary bombs used in the late 20th century sometimes contained thermite, made from aluminium and ferric oxide. It takes very high temperatures to ignite, but when alight, it can burn through solid steel. In World War II, such devices were employed in incendiary grenades to burn through heavy armour plate, or as a quick welding mechanism to destroy artillery and other complex machined weapons.

A variety of pyrophoric materials can also be used: selected organometallic compounds, most often triethylaluminium, trimethylaluminium, and some other alkyl and aryl derivatives of aluminium, magnesium, boron, zinc, sodium, and lithium, can be used. Thickened triethylaluminium, a napalm-like substance that ignites in contact with air, is known as thickened pyrophoric agent, or TPA.

Napalm proper is no longer used by the United States, although the kerosene-fuelled Mark 77 MOD 5 firebomb is currently in use. The United States has confirmed the use of Mark 77s in invasion of Iraq in 2003.

== Incendiary weapons and laws of warfare ==
Prior to 1980, when Protocol III of the UN Convention on Conventional Weapons was signed, international law did not directly address incendiary weapons. Signatory states to Protocol III are bound by which governs the use of incendiary weapons:

- prohibits the use of incendiary weapons against civilians (effectively a reaffirmation of the general prohibition on attacks against civilians in Additional Protocol I to the Geneva Conventions)
- prohibits the use of air-delivered incendiary weapons against military targets located within concentrations of civilians and loosely regulates the use of other types of incendiary weapons in such circumstances.

Protocol III states though that incendiary weapons do not include:

- Munitions which may have incidental incendiary effects, such as illuminates, tracers, smoke or signaling systems;
- Munitions designed to combine penetration, blast or fragmentation effects with an additional incendiary effect, such as armor-piercing projectiles, fragmentation shells, explosive bombs and similar combined-effects munitions in which the incendiary effect is not specifically designed to cause burn injury to persons, but to be used against military objectives, such as armoured vehicles, aircraft and installations or facilities.

Because Protocol III was created with the firebombing campaigns of WWII and Vietnam in mind, it has weaker protections for the use of ground launched incendiary weapons, such as artillery. It also did not foresee the shift to modern counterinsurgency combat, which often occurs in urban settings. Its exclusion of munitions with only incidental incendiary effects means that some weapons with incendiary effects remain legal. For example, white phosphorus munitions—which may be used for smokescreens but may also set fires and burn flesh to the bone—remain legal and in wide use.

== See also ==
- Arson
- Bat bomb
- Driptorch
- Early thermal weapons
- Fire accelerant
- Fire balloon
- Firestorm
- Fire bombing
- Flame fougasse
- Flamethrower
- Greek fire (Historic Byzantine incendiary weapon)
- High explosive incendiary (HEI)
- Incendiary ammunition
- Meng Huo You (Historic Chinese incendiary weapon)
- Molotov cocktail
- Napalm
- Pen Huo Qi (Historic Chinese flamethrower)
- Stinkpot (Historic Chinese incendiary weapon)
