= L04 =

L04 may refer to:

- Holtville Airport's FAA identifier
- ATC code L04 Immunosuppressants, a subgroup of the Anatomical Therapeutic Chemical Classification System

== See also ==
- L4 (disambiguation)
