= Oliva (surname) =

Oliva is a Spanish, Portuguese, Italian, Malagasy and Czech surname meaning "olive".

Notable people with the surname include

- Achille Bonito Oliva (born 1939), Italian art critic
- Aythami Artiles Oliva (born 1986), Spanish footballer
- Carlos Oliva Argueta (born 1979), Honduran footballer
- Carlos Oliva Sosa (born 1948), Peruvian footballer
- Christian Oliva (born 1996), Uruguayan footballer
- Criss Oliva (1963–1993), American guitarist
- Edel Oliva (born 1965), Cuban race walker
- Enrique Trinidad Oliva (1918-1967), Guatemalan colonel
- Erneido Oliva (1932–2020), Cuban-American army general
- Fernán Pérez de Oliva (c.1492–c.1530), Spanish writer
- Fernando Nicolas Oliva (born 1971), Argentine retired football player
- Giovanni Paolo Oliva (1600–1681), Italian Jesuit priest
- Ignazio Oliva (17th century), Italian painter
- Isabel Flores de Oliva (1586–1617), Spanish-Peruvian saint
- Jared Oliva (born 1995), American baseball player
- Jay Oliva (born 1976), American storyboard artist
- Jon Oliva (born 1960), American singer
- José Oliva (1971–1997), Dominican baseball player
- Juan Manuel Oliva (born 1960), Mexican politician
- L. Jay Oliva (1933–2014), American university president
- Mariana Díaz Oliva (born 1976), Argentine tennis player
- Mariana González Oliva (born 1976), Argentine retired field hockey player
- Mauricio Oliva (born 1951), Honduran politician
- Maximiliano Oliva (born 1990), Argentine footballer
- Patrizio Oliva (born 1959), Italian boxer
- Peter Oliva (born 1964), Canadian novelist
- Sergio Oliva (1941–2012), Cuban bodybuilder
- Tony Oliva (born 1938), Cuban baseball player
- Valentin Oliva (born 1998), Argentine singer-songwriter artistically known as Wos
- Vicente Pascual Oliva (died 1848), Spanish Franciscan missionary
- Viktor Oliva (1861–1928), Czech painter

Fictional characters

- Biscuit Oliva, a character from Baki the Grappler
