= 54th Infantry Regiment =

54th Infantry Regiment may refer to:

- 54th Infantry Regiment (United States)
- 54th Infantry Regiment (France)
- 54th Infantry Regiment (Imperial Japanese Army)

== See also ==
- 54th Regiment, including American Civil War infantry regiments
