= Olivia =

Olivia may refer to:

== People and fictional characters ==
- Olivia (name), including a list of people and fictional characters with the name
- Olivia (singer), American singer Olivia Longott (born 1981)
- Olívia (basketball), Brazilian basketball player Carlos Henrique Rodrigues do Nascimento (born 1974)
- Olivia Lufkin (born 1979), also known mononymously as Olivia, Japanese-American singer
- Olivia Trappeniers (born 1997), also known mononymously as Olivia, Belgian Flemish singer
- Olivia Dean (born 1999), also known mononymously as Olivia, English singer

== Places ==
- Olivia, Mauritius, a place in Mauritius
- Olivia, Minnesota, United States
- Olivia, North Carolina, United States
- Olivia, Pennsylvania, United States
- Lake Olivia, in Highlands County, Florida

== Arts and entertainment ==
=== Film and television ===
- Olivia (1951 film), a French film based on the Bussy novel
- Olivia (1983 film), an American psychological thriller film
- Olivia (TV series), a 2009 children's animated TV series
- "Olivia" (Fringe episode), 2010
- "Olivia" (Sugar episode), 2024
- Olivia, a 1978 ABC variety special with Olivia Newton-John

=== Literature ===
- Olivia (Bussy novel), by Dorothy Bussy under the pen name "Olivia", 1949
- Olivia (Rossner novel), by Judith Rossner, 1994
- Olivia (Rushton novel), by Rosie Rushton, 1997
- Olivia (magazine), a Finnish women's magazine
- Olivia (play), by W. G. Wills in the 1870s
- Olivia (book series), by Ian Falconer

=== Music ===
- Olivia (Olivia Newton-John album), 1972
- Olivia (Olivia album), 2001
- Olivia (EP), by Olivia Holt, 2016
- Olivia Records, record label
- "Olivia", a 2013 song by Rasmus Seebach
- "(Olivia) Lost and Turned Out", a 1978 song by The Whispers from the album Headlights
- "Olivia", a song by One Direction on their 2015 album Made in the A.M.
- "Olivia", a 2022 song by Wolves of Glendale

== Other uses ==
- Olivia (dog) (born 2015), a dog actress
- Olivia Travel, a lesbian-oriented travel company
- Olivia MFSK, an amateur radio digital transmission protocol
- 835 Olivia, an asteroid
- Olivia Business Centre, in Gdansk, Poland
- Hala Olivia, an arena in Gdańsk, Poland
- Tropical Storm Olivia, a list of tropical storms named Olivia

== See also ==
- Olivier (disambiguation)
- Oliva (disambiguation)
- Oliwia (disambiguation)
