= María Enma Botet Dubois =

Cuban composer

María Enma Botet Dubois (10 August 1903 – 24 August 1989) was a Cuban pianist, composer and music educator. She was born in Matanzas and studied music with Hubert de Blanck and Joaquin Nin. After completing her studies, she taught music at the Hubert de Blanck Conservatory and the Amadeo Roldan Conservatory in Havana. She died in Miami.

== Works ==
María Emma Botet composed choral and piano works and pieces for voice and piano, including sones, guarachas, habaneras, rumbas, criollas, guajiras, pregons and boleros. Selected works include:

- Suite Cubana for piano
- Pequeno Son
- Dancitas de Ayer
- Era una guajirita
- Cancion de guajiro
- De dos en dos (contradanza)
- Las goticas de lluven bailan el bolero
- Bailamos (Habanera)
- Caserita se va el dulcero
- La cajita de musica toca una criolla
- Diablito Carnavalesco
