= Oliwa (disambiguation) =

- Oliwa is one of the quarter of Gdańsk, Poland.

Oliwa may also refer to:

- Krzysztof Oliwa, ice hockey player
- Marek Oliwa (born 1974), Polish chess master
- Typhoon Oliwa, a 1997 supertyphoon
- Oliwa forests, forests in Gdańsk
- Oliwa Cathedral, Gdańsk
