= Silvi Liiva =

Estonian printmaker (1941–2023)

Silvi Liiva (22 January 1941 – 24 September 2023) was an Estonian printmaker.

Liivia was born in Värska. Between 1958 and 1963, she studied at the Tartu Art School and from 1963 until 1969, at the State Art Institute of the Estonian SSR. She worked as an artistic editor in the publishing house Eesti Raamat. In the years 1978–1987, she was a lecturer at the State Art Institute of the Estonian SSR, after that she was a freelance artist.

Liiva was a member of the Estonian Artists' Union (formerly the Artists' Union of the Estonian SSR) since 1972, and a member of the Association of Estonian Printmakers since 1991.

Liiva died on 24 September 2023, at the age of 82.

== Acknowledgment ==
- 1973 Annual Graphic Award of the Artists' Union of the Estonian SSR
- 1979 Annual Graphic Award of the Artists' Union of the Estonian SSR
- 1982 Annual Graphic Award of the Artists' Union of the Estonian SSR
- 1985 Annual Graphic Award of the Artists' Union of the Estonian SSR
- 1986 Merited Artist of Estonian SSR
- 2003 Kristjan Raud Art Award (a series of large-format graphic pages exhibited in the G-gallery art hall)
- 2007 Wiiralt Award
- 2013 Order of the White Star
