= Level 4 =

Level 4 or Level Four or Level IV may refer to:

== Technology ==
- Level 4, a level of automation in a self-driving car (see Autonomous car#Classification)
- Level 4, the transport layer in the OSI model of computer communications

== Gradation ==
- Level 4 Biosafety level
- Level 4 trauma center

== Music ==
- LVL IV album by Future Leaders of the World 2004
- Level 4 (Globe album)

== Other uses ==
- Level 0 coronavirus restrictions, see COVID-19 pandemic in Scotland#Levels System
- STANAG 4569 protection level
