= Zeppelin LZ 24 =

LZ 24 (L 3)
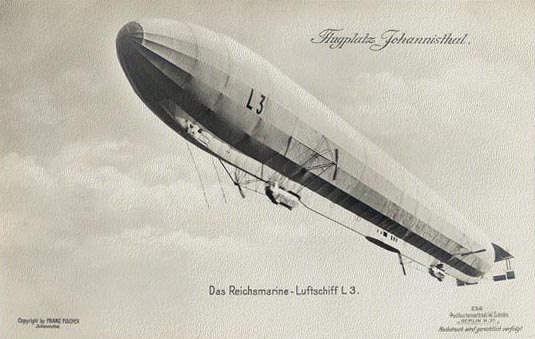
- LZ 24 (L 3)

General information
- Type: M-class reconnaissance-bomber rigid airship
- National origin: German Empire
- Manufacturer: Luftschiffbau Zeppelin
- Designer: Ludwig Dürr
- Primary user: Imperial German Navy
- Number built: 1

History
- First flight: 11 May 1914
- Retired: Destroyed by its crew on 17 February 1915

L 3 (factory number LZ 24) was a Type M-class Zeppelin (the first standardized wartime model) operated by the Imperial German Navy during World War I. It made its maiden flight on 11 May 1914 and was the 24th airship constructed by Luftschiffbau Zeppelin, as well as the third delivered to the Navy. As the first of the Type M class, it marked the beginning of a series of twelve airships produced and distributed equally between the Imperial German Army and Navy by March 1915.

== Operational history ==
Zeppelin LZ 24 undertook its first flight on 11 May 1914, completing a continuous 35-hour journey before being commissioned by the Imperial German Navy under the designation L 3. Its predecessors, L 1 and L 2, were lost in accidents during the autumn of 1913 after brief service lives of just under eleven months and six weeks, respectively. During fleet manoeuvres, L 3 was employed in maritime reconnaissance operations.

At the outbreak of the First World War in August 1914, L 3 remained the sole airship in service with the Imperial German Navy. It was stationed in a leased hangar at Hamburg-Fuhlsbüttel to support naval operations in the North and Baltic Seas. By the end of the year, the Navy's airship division—commanded by Korvettenkapitän Peter Strasser—was reinforced by the delivery of sister ships L 4 through L 8. These vessels became operational only gradually due to a shortage of trained personnel. The civilian airship LZ 11 Viktoria Luise served primarily as a training platform. In 1914, Nordholz near the mouth of the Elbe was added as a reconnaissance base for North Sea operations, followed by Hage in East Frisia, Tondern (then in North Schleswig), Ahlhorn in 1916, and Wittmundhaven in 1917.

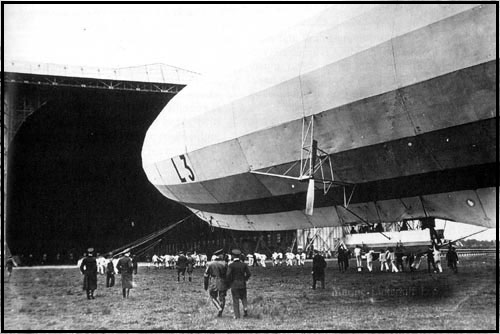
Zeppelin L 3 in front of its hangar at Fuhlsbüttel, circa 1914–1915

Having completed 24 reconnaissance missions over the North Sea during its operational service, Zeppelin L 3 and the newly commissioned naval Zeppelin L 4 conducted the first airship raid on England on the night of 19–20 January 1915. L 3 carried eight 50-kg high-explosive bombs and eleven 28-kg incendiary devices, intended for industrial targets along the Humber and in Kingston upon Hull. Due to increasing winds, neither airship reached the Humber; both were diverted to the North Norfolk coast. L 3 conducted a bombing raid on Great Yarmouth and surrounding areas, dropping its first bomb on farmland at Ormesby St Michael (Little Ormesby) before striking targets in the town. The attack damaged property and resulted in the first civilian fatalities from an air raid on British soil, killing Samuel Alfred Smith and Martha Mary Taylor and injuring two others.

== Final mission of L 3 ==
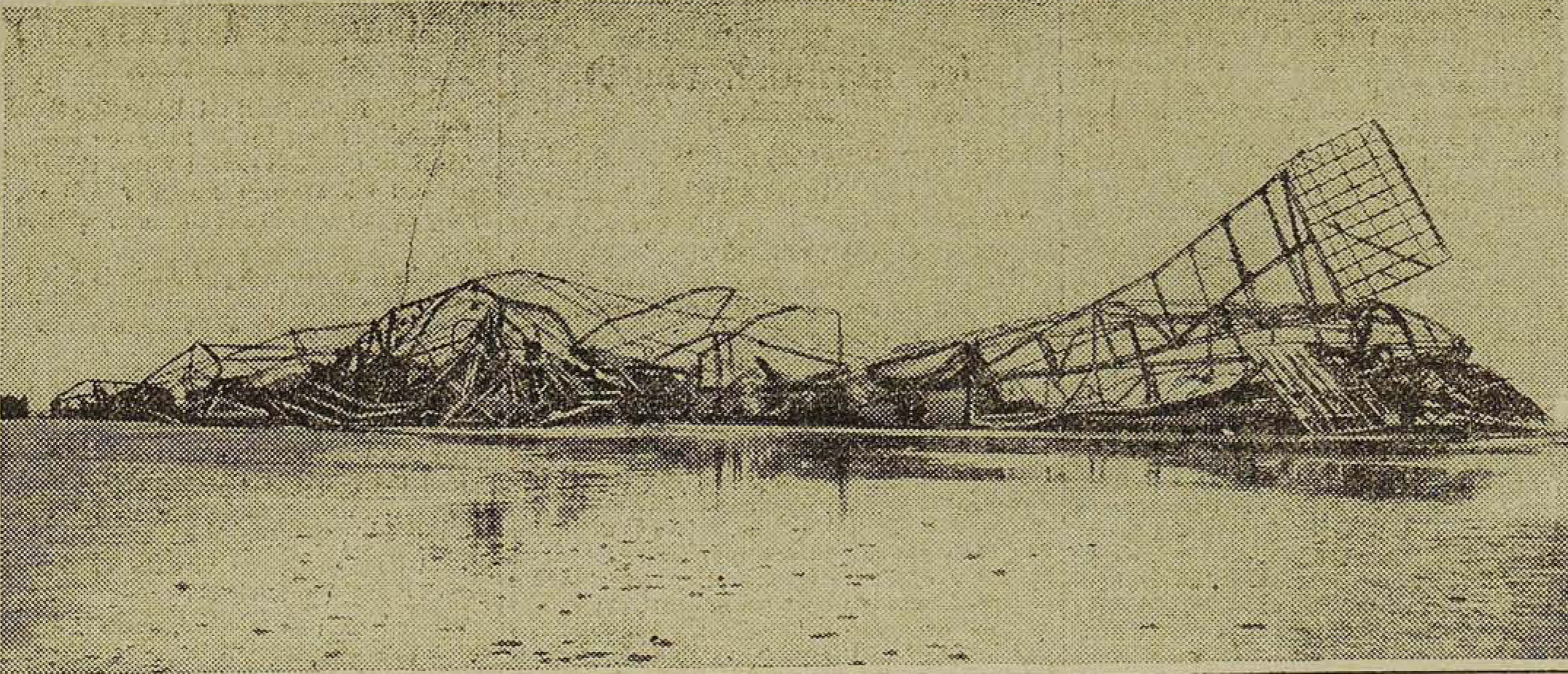
Wreckage of Zeppelin L 3 at low tide on Fanø following its deliberate destruction by the crew, as photographed before publication in The Daily Telegraph, 2 March 1915

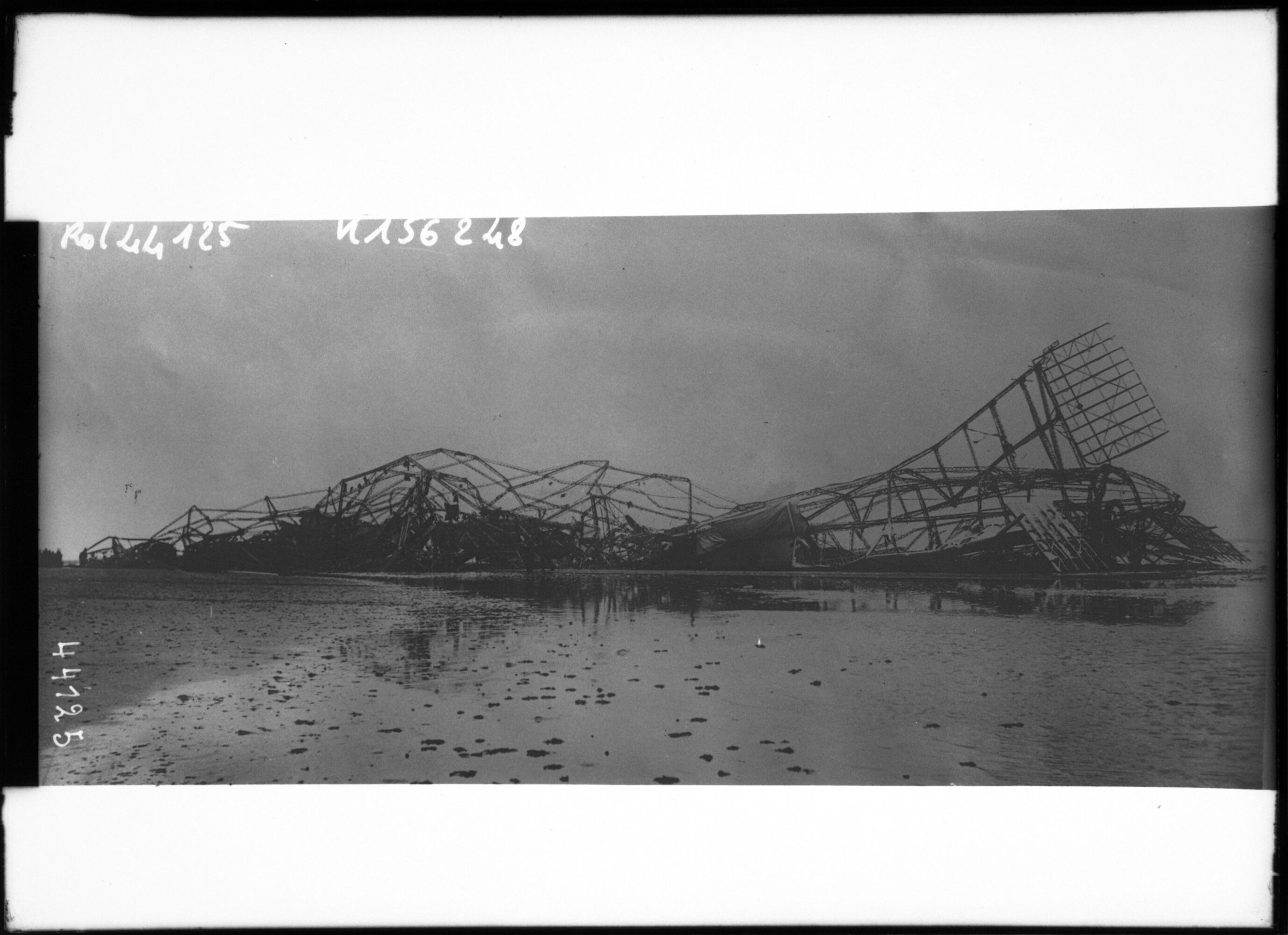
Original photograph of the wreckage

On 17 February 1915, L 3 was returning from a reconnaissance mission toward Norway when it encountered a snowstorm over the North Sea off southern Denmark, near Blåvandshuk. One engine failed around 11:00, followed by another at 13:00. Still caught in the storm off Hanstholm in northern Denmark at 13:00, the Zeppelin radioed its difficulties to the Navy and turned south, aiming to reach the airship base at Tondern. When the final engine also failed, L 3 was forced to make an emergency landing on the Danish island of Fanø to avoid drifting helplessly over the sea. The commanding officer, Kapitänleutnant Hans Fritz, destroyed the documents and set fire to the airship. The crew was interned in neutral Denmark for the remainder of the war in accordance with international regulations. In the same storm, sister ship L 4 experienced engine trouble and attempted a landing near Blåvandshuk, but ultimately crash-landed at Børsmose Beach.

== Specifications (LZ 24 / M2-class zeppelin) ==
Data from Zeppelin : rigid airships, 1893-1940, The Zeppelin Airships - Part Two: Zeppelins of the Great War 1914–1918

General characteristics

- Crew: 16
- Capacity: 9,200 kg (20,283 lb) typical disposable load
- Length: 158 m (518 ft 4 in)
- Diameter: 14.9 m (48 ft 11 in) maximum
- Fineness ratio: 10.61
- Volume: 22,470 m^{3} (794,000 cu ft) in 18 gas cells
- Empty weight: 16,900 kg (37,258 lb)
- Fuel capacity: 4,000 kg (8,818 lb) maximum
- Useful lift: 26,100 kg (57,500 lb)
- Powerplant: 3 × Maybach C-X 6-cylinder water-cooled in-line piston engines, 130 kW (180 hp) each
- Propellers: 2-bladed fixed-pitch propellers

Performance

- Maximum speed: 84 km/h (52 mph, 45 kn)
- Cruise speed: 80.5 km/h (50.0 mph, 43.5 kn)
- Range: 2,200 km (1,400 mi, 1,200 nmi)
- Service ceiling: 2,800 m (9,200 ft) static

Armament

- Guns: 4x machine-guns

== See also ==
- Zeppelin L 4 (Zeppelins L 3 and L 4 frequently operated in tandem as part of coordinated naval airship sorties over the North Sea and eastern England)
- List of Zeppelins

== Bibliography ==
=== References ===
- Lehmann, Ernst A. (1927). The Zeppelins. The Development of the Airship, with the Story of the Zeppelin Air Raids in the World War. trans. Mingos, Howard. Sears.
- Massie, Robert K. (2003). Castles of Steel: Britain, Germany, and the Winning of the Great War at Sea. Random House Publishing Group. ISBN 9781588363206. - Total pages: 880
- Robinson, Douglas Hill (1973). Giants in the Sky: A History of the Rigid Airship. University of Washington Press. ISBN 9780295952499. - Total pages: 376
