= 54th Street (disambiguation) =

54th Street may refer to:

- 54th Street (Manhattan)
- 54th Street (Miami)
- 54th Street (Washington, D.C.)
- 54th Street (West End Line)
- 54th Street Revue, American variety television program broadcast on CBS from 1949 to 1950
- 54th Street Theater, New York City
