= Enrique Trinidad Oliva =

Colonel Enrique Trinidad Oliva (1918-1967) was a Guatemalan official who served as the Chief Minister under Elfego Hernán Monzón Aguirre during the 1954 Guatemalan coup d'état. He was described as a "central figure" in the coup by The New York Times.
