= LiV DASH =

The LiV DASH is a lithium-ion battery powered vehicle made by Hybrid Technologies. Built on the Smart Fortwo platform, it was first made available through a cross promotional sale with Sam's Club on November 7, 2007. It was later made available for an online purchase through the company's 2008 vehicle lineup for $43,500.
