= 54th Infantry =

54th Infantry may refer to:

- 54th Infantry Brigade (United Kingdom)
- 54th Infantry Regiment (France)
- 54th Infantry Regiment (United States)
- 54th Massachusetts Infantry Regiment

== See also ==
- 54th Regiment of Foot (disambiguation)
