= HMS Riviera =

1911 seaplane tender

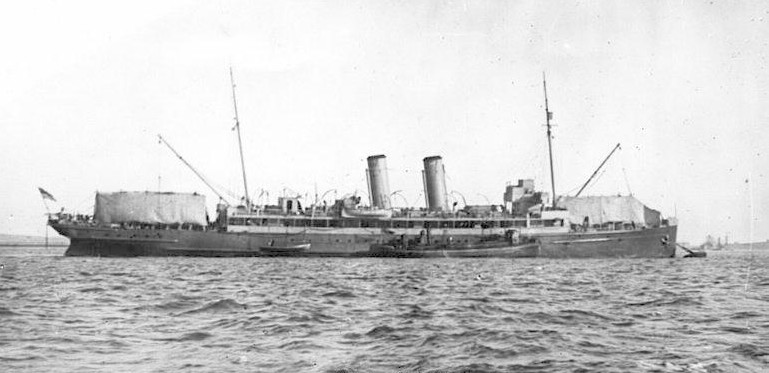
- Riviera at anchor in 1914–1915 with her early canvas hangars

History

United Kingdom
- Name: Riviera
- Owner: South East and Chatham Railway
- Port of registry: London (1911–1914)
- Builder: William Denny and Brothers, Dumbarton, Scotland
- Launched: 1 April 1911
- Completed: 1911
- Fate: Leased to Royal Navy, 11 August 1914

United Kingdom
- Acquired: 11 August 1914; February 1915 (purchased)
- Commissioned: 6 September 1914
- Fate: Sold back to owners, 31 May 1919

United Kingdom
- Owner: South East and Chatham Railway/Southern Railway
- Acquired: 31 May 1919
- Fate: Sold, 1932

United Kingdom
- Owner: Burns & Laird Lines
- Port of registry: Glasgow
- Acquired: 1932
- Renamed: Laird's Isle
- Fate: Leased by the Royal Navy, 28 August 1939

United Kingdom
- Acquired: 28 August 1939
- Reclassified: Landing Ship, Infantry (LSI (H)), 1944
- Fate: Returned to owners, 1945; Scrapped, 1957

General characteristics (as of 1918)
- Type: Seaplane carrier
- Tonnage: 1,675 gross register tons (GRT)
- Displacement: 2,550 long tons (2,590 t) (deep load)
- Length: 323 ft (98.5 m)
- Beam: 41 ft (12.5 m)
- Draught: 13 ft 8 in (4.2 m)
- Installed power: 6 water-tube boilers; 11,000 shp (8,200 kW)
- Propulsion: 3 shafts; 3 steam turbines
- Speed: 20.5 knots (38.0 km/h; 23.6 mph)
- Range: 1,250 nmi (2,320 km; 1,440 mi) at 15 knots (28 km/h; 17 mph)
- Complement: 197
- Armament: 4 × 12 pdr (3 in (76 mm)) guns; 2 × 3 pdr (47 mm (1.9 in)) AA guns
- Aircraft carried: 4 × seaplanes

HMS Riviera was a seaplane tender which served in the Royal Navy (RN) during the First and Second World Wars. Converted from the cross-Channel packet ship SS Riviera, she was initially fitted with temporary hangars for three seaplanes for aerial reconnaissance and bombing missions in the North Sea. She participated in the unsuccessful Cuxhaven Raid in late 1914 before she began a more thorough conversion in 1915 that increased her capacity to four aircraft. Riviera and her aircraft then spent several years spotting for British warships bombarding the Belgian coast and making unsuccessful attacks on targets in Germany. She was transferred to the Mediterranean in 1918 and returned to her owners the following year.

Sold in 1932 and renamed RMTS Laird's Isle for service in the Irish Sea, she was requisitioned again in 1939 by the Admiralty for service as an armed boarding vessel to enforce the British blockade of Germany. HMS Laird's Isle became a training ship in 1940 and was then converted in 1944 into a troop transport for amphibious landings. She was returned to her owners after the war and resumed her service in the Irish Sea until she was sold for scrap in 1957.

== Description ==
Riviera had an overall length of 323 feet (98.5 m), a beam of 41 feet (12.5 m), and a mean draught of 13 feet 8 inches (4.2 m). She displaced 2,550 long tons (2,590 t) at deep load and was rated at 1,675 gross register tons (GRT). Each of the ship's three sets of direct-drive steam turbines drove one propeller shaft. The ship's six Babcock & Wilcox boilers generated enough steam to produce 11,000 shaft horsepower (8,200 kW) from the turbines, enough for a designed speed of 20.5 knots (38.0 km/h; 23.6 mph). She made a speed of 23 knots (43 km/h; 26 mph) during her sea trials from 11,393 shaft horsepower (8,496 kW). Riviera carried 400 tonnes (390 long tons) of coal, enough to give her a range of 1,250 nautical miles (2,320 km; 1,440 mi) at 15 knots (28 km/h; 17 mph).

== Building and service ==
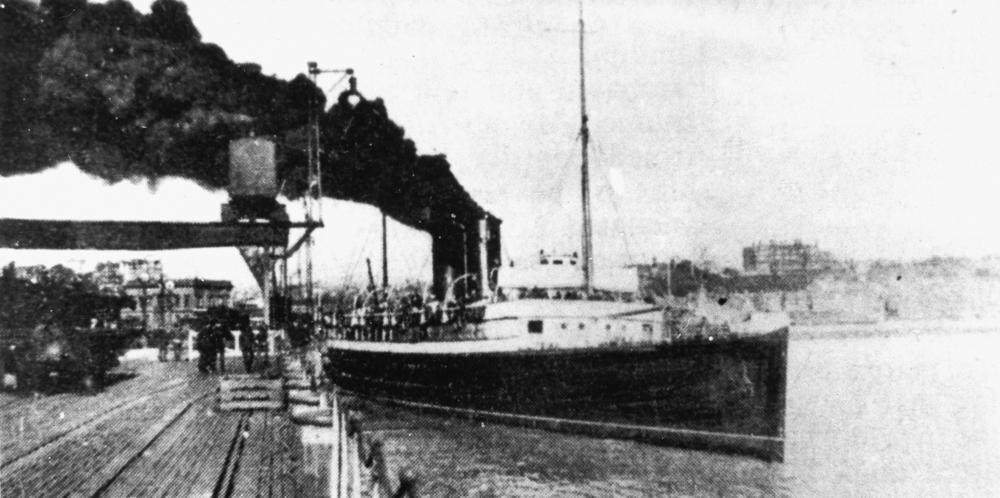
Riviera in civilian service

Riviera was laid down by William Denny and Brothers at their Dumbarton, Scotland shipyard as a fast packet for the South East and Chatham Railway's Dover and Folkestone to Boulogne runs. The ship was launched on 1 April 1911 and completed later that year. She was requisitioned for service by the Admiralty on 11 August 1914, and was commissioned on 6 September after she was modified to handle seaplanes by Chatham Dockyard. Three canvas hangars were installed, one forward and two aft, and there was no flight deck, the aircraft being lowered onto the sea for takeoff and recovered again from the sea after landing by newly installed derricks. In 1918 her crew numbered 197 officers and ratings, including 53 aviation personnel.

Upon completion of the modifications on 1 September, Riviera was assigned to the Harwich Force along with the seaplane tenders Empress and Engadine. On Christmas Day 1914, nine aircraft from all three ships took part in the Cuxhaven Raid on hangars housing Zeppelin airships. Seven of the nine seaplanes successfully took off for the attack, but they inflicted little damage. Only three of the aircraft returned to be recovered, but the crews of the other three ditched safely and were recovered by a British submarine and the Dutch trawler Marta van Hattem.

Riviera was purchased in February 1915 by the Admiralty and she was modified by Cunard at Liverpool from 14 February to 7 April 1915 with a permanent, four-aircraft, hangar in the rear superstructure. A pair of cranes were mounted at the rear of the hangar to hoist the seaplanes in and out of the water. Four quick-firing (QF) 12-pounder (3 in (76 mm)) 12 cwt guns, (Note: "Cwt" is the abbreviation for hundredweight, 12 cwt referring to the weight of the gun.) each with 130 rounds, and two Vickers QF 3-pounder (47 mm (1.9 in)) anti-aircraft guns, each with 65 rounds, were fitted for self-defence. She also carried a pigeon loft that housed carrier pigeons to be used by her aircraft if their Wireless was broken.

Upon completion of the conversion, she rejoined the Harwich Force; in early May she conducted the handling trials of the prototype Short Type 184 floatplane. On 4 July, Riviera and Engadine attempted to launch aircraft to reconnoitre the River Ems and lure out a Zeppelin so that it could be attacked. Only one of Riviera's two Short Brothers floatplanes was able to take off successfully and it dropped a few small bombs without noticeable effect. The pilot located the ships by spotting the four Zeppelins that were observing them. All three of Engadine's Sopwith Schneiders, intended to attack the airships, failed to take off.

Riviera later saw service with the Dover Patrol where her aircraft flew spotting missions for naval bombardments off the Belgian coast. She was transferred to the Mediterranean Fleet in May 1918 where she was based out of Malta, conducting anti-submarine patrols, for the remainder of the war.

On 31 May 1919 the ship was sold back to her original owners, the South Eastern and Chatham Railway, and resumed her former role as a cross-Channel ferry. Riviera passed to the Southern Railway in 1923 in the grouping of Britain's railways. She was sold to the Burns & Laird Lines and renamed RMTS Laird's Isle for service in the Irish Sea.

=== Second World War ===
She was once again requisitioned on 28 August 1939 as HMS Laird's Isle, to serve as an armed boarding vessel. To suit her new duties, she was equipped with a single four-inch (102 mm) and two 40-millimetre (1.6 in) QF two-pounder guns. Laird's Isle was converted into a torpedo training ship in 1940. In 1944 she was converted into a Landing Ship, Infantry (LSI(H)) and her two-pounders were replaced by two 20-millimetre (0.8 in) Oerlikon anti-aircraft guns. Her role was to transport troops to the coast being assaulted where they would disembark via the smaller LCAs carried by the ship. The ship was returned to her owners in 1945 and resumed operations until she was sold for scrap in 1957.
