= 54th Regiment of Foot (disambiguation) =

54th Regiment of Foot was the designation of the 43rd (Monmouthshire) Regiment of Foot prior to 1751.

54th Regiment of Foot may also refer to:

- 43rd (Monmouthshire) Regiment of Foot, a.k.a. 54th Regiment of Foot, numbered as the 54th Foot in 1747 and renumbered as the 43rd in 1751
- 52nd (Oxfordshire) Regiment of Foot, a.k.a. 54th Regiment of Foot, raised in 1755 and renumbered as the 52nd in 1756

== See also ==
- 54th Infantry (disambiguation)
