= Spokane, Portland and Seattle class L-4 =

L-4
Type and origin
- Power type: Steam
- Builder: Rogers Locomotive Works
- Build date: November 1883
Specifications
- Configuration
  - Whyte: 4-4-0
- Gauge: 4 ft 8 1/2 in (1,435 mm)
- Driver dia.: 63 in (1,600 mm)
- Adhesive weight: 53,200 lb (24,100 kg)
- Loco weight: 73,320 lb (33,260 kg)
- Fuel type: Oil
- Boiler pressure: 130 lbf/in²
- Cylinders: 2
- Cylinder size: 17 in × 24 in (430 mm × 610 mm)
Performance figures
- Tractive effort: 13,100 lbf
Career
- Operators: Spokane, Portland and Seattle Railway
- Class: L-4
- Locale: United States

The Spokane, Portland and Seattle Railway (SP&S) class L-4 steam locomotives were originally used by the Astoria and Columbia River Railroad (AC&R). They became SP&S locomotives when the SP&S acquired the A&CR.

== Background ==
The Astoria & Columbia River Railroad ran from Portland, Oregon, to Astoria, Oregon, along the south bank of the Columbia River. In 1896-97 several locomotives were obtained secondhand for the newly completed line. Among these locomotives were A&CR numbers 6 and 7. These locomotives would become the two members of Class L-4 when the SP&S bought out the A&CR in 1911.

== Numbering ==
Upon the acquisition of the A&CR by the SP&S both locomotives were renumbered and placed into Class L-4. A&CR number 6 was renumbered SP&S number 53 on February 24, 1911. A&CR number 7 was renumbered SP&S number 54 on February 24, 1911.

== Disposition ==
SP&S number 53 was sold to Warren CC on May 6, 1920. SP&S number 54 was dismantled in May 1924.
