= Liv (surname) =

Liv is a surname, and people with the surname include:

- Kwamie Liv (born 1985), a Danish-Zambian artist, singer and songwriter
- Stefan Liv (1980–2011), a Polish-born Swedish professional ice hockey goaltender
- Steven Liv, birth name of Hans Sama, French League of Legends player
- Cecilie Liv Hansen (born 2001), Danish politician
