= L 4 =

WW1 German Zeppelin

LZ 27 (L 4)

General information
- Type: M-class reconnaissance-bomber rigid airship
- National origin: German Empire
- Manufacturer: Luftschiffbau Zeppelin
- Designer: Ludwig Dürr
- Status: Lost with four crew members
- Primary user: Imperial German Navy

History
- First flight: 18 August 1914
- Retired: Last seen over the North Sea on 17 February 1915

L 4 (factory number LZ 27) was an M-class Zeppelin constructed by Luftschiffbau Zeppelin in Friedrichshafen for the Imperial German Navy. It made its maiden flight on 18 August 1914, shortly after the outbreak of World War I. Operating from its base in Fuhlsbüttel, L 4—alongside L 3 (LZ 24)—carried out the first air raid on England during the war, bombing coastal towns in Norfolk on 19 January 1915.

On 17 February 1915, during a reconnaissance mission over the North Sea, L 4 encountered a snowstorm from the south and was forced to make an emergency landing in neutral Denmark. Eleven crew members escaped at Børsmose Beach, but the airship ascended again with four mechanics still aboard and subsequently vanished over the sea. All four were presumed drowned, marking the first fatalities in the Imperial German Navy's airship division.

== Stationed at Fuhlsbüttel near Hamburg ==
On 1 September 1914, Kapitänleutnant Graf Zdenko Magnus von Platen-Hallermund assumed command of L 4, with Oberleutnant zur See Werner Petersen as first officer. The airship was stationed in Fuhlsbüttel, near Hamburg, the following day.

Later that month, Petersen was replaced by Leutnant zur See Kruse. Petersen would later go on to command L 7, L 12, L 16, and L 32.

== First air raid on England (19 January 1915) ==
Following the large-scale British seaplane raid on Zeppelin facilities and shore installations near Cuxhaven—including the naval airship base at Nordholz—on Christmas Day 1914, Kaiser Wilhelm II, who had previously forbidden airship attacks on England due to concerns over civilian casualties and diplomatic repercussions, reversed his stance and authorised retaliatory Zeppelin raids. This marked a pivotal escalation in aerial warfare, ushering in Germany's campaign of strategic bombing against British targets. Initially, these raids were restricted to coastal towns, reflecting lingering caution over civilian harm and navigational limitations.

At 11:00 a.m. on 19 January 1915, Zeppelin L 3 (commanded by Hans Fritz) and L 4 departed Fuhlsbüttel en route to the Humber Estuary, aiming for Kingston upon Hull, each carrying eight 50-kg high-explosive bombs and eleven 28-kg incendiary devices. Poor weather forced both airships to divert southward, initiating their attack on coastal towns along the North Norfolk coast. Zeppelin L 3 bombed Great Yarmouth, while Zeppelin L 4 targeted Sheringham, and later King's Lynn—resulting in the first British civilian fatalities of the war from aerial attack.

Zeppelin commander Peter Strasser oversaw the operation from aboard Zeppelin L 6, which was forced to turn back due to technical problems. A northerly wind diverted L 3 and L 4 toward Norfolk. At 19:55, L 4 crossed the coast at Bacton and turned west, while L 3 headed south to bomb Great Yarmouth.

At approximately 20:30 GMT, Zeppelin L 4 dropped its first incendiary bomb over Sheringham, followed by a second at 20:45. It then proceeded west along the coast, releasing bombs on the villages of Brancaster, Heacham, and Snettisham—near the southern reaches of The Wash. In Snettisham, one bomb landed near St Mary's Church, reportedly damaging the structure. L 4 then flew south past Sandringham House and bombed King's Lynn at approximately 22:50. The first bomb fell in a field behind Tennyson Avenue, followed by another on nearby allotments. Subsequent bombs struck Bentinck Street, Albert Street, and surrounding residential areas, resulting in the deaths of two civilians—26-year-old war widow Alice Gazely and 14-year-old Percy Goate—and injuring thirteen others. Both victims reportedly died from shock rather than direct physical trauma.

No further bombs were dropped during the return journey over Norwich, which was blacked out and shrouded in fog. Both airships returned safely to Fuhlsbüttel, as Royal Naval Air Service aircraft failed to intercept them—highlighting Britain's limited air defenses at the time.

== Crash at Børsmose Beach (17 February 1915) ==
On 17 February 1915 at 04:00, L 3 and L 4 departed Fuhlsbüttel for a reconnaissance mission off the Norwegian coast, tasked with safeguarding the route of the steamer Rubens, which was transporting supplies to German East Africa.

L 4, commanded by von Platen-Hallermund and with officer Kruse aboard, carried out the mission but encountered a snowstorm on the return leg. L 3 made an emergency landing on Fanø, while L 4 experienced engine trouble. A distress signal was sent at 17:25, and by 18:30 only the front gondola engine remained operational.

Unable to reach the airship base at Tondern (then in North Schleswig), von Platen-Hallermund attempted a landing near Blåvandshuk, ultimately crash-landing at Børsmose Beach. The front gondola was badly damaged. Eleven crew members escaped; one broke a leg while jumping. However, the gas cell valves were not opened, and the ship, now lighter, ascended with four mechanics still aboard. L 4 vanished over the sea, and the four crew members were presumed drowned—the first fatalities in the Imperial Navy’s airship division.

In the 1960s, wreckage bearing Imperial Navy markings was recovered from the seabed off Fjand, a coastal settlement in West Jutland, Denmark, and was believed to have belonged to L 4.

== Internment in Denmark ==
The survivors initially identified themselves as fishermen to avoid arrest but were soon recognized and interned in Varde, later held alongside L 3's crew on Fanø. By order of the Danish government, both crews were transferred for internment at the 6th Infantry Regiment barracks in Odense, in accordance with international law requiring them to remain in neutral Denmark until the end of the war.

Von Platen-Hallermund and a Leutnant, Pzygode, were later held in Aalborg, from where they escaped by bicycle on 19 December 1917, claiming to be searching for Pzygode's dachshund. Von Platen-Hallermund successfully reached Hamburg.

Kruse was released and served as first officer aboard L 60 from 1 April 1918 until its destruction in the Tondern raid on 19 July 1918. He also worked with the German naval attaché to the Nordic countries in Copenhagen.

== Technical data ==
Technical Specifications

- Lifting gas volume: 22,500 m³ of hydrogen
- Length: 158.0 metres
- Diameter: 14.90 metres
- Payload capacity: 9.2 metric tons
- Propulsion: Three Maybach engines, each producing 210 horsepower (154 kW)
- Speed: 22.5 metres per second
