= 54th Brigade =

54th Brigade may refer to:

== India ==
- 54th Indian Brigade of the British Indian Army in the First World War

== Soviet Union ==
- 54th Rifle Brigade

== Ukraine ==
- 54th Mechanized Brigade

== United Kingdom ==
- 54th Anti-Aircraft Brigade
- 54th Infantry Brigade (United Kingdom)

=== Artillery units ===
- 54th Brigade, Royal Field Artillery of the British Army in the First World War
- 54th (Wessex) Brigade, Royal Field Artillery of the British Army after the First World War
- 54th (City of London) Anti-Aircraft Brigade, Royal Garrison Artillery
- 54th (Thames and Medway) Anti-Aircraft Brigade
- 54th (West Highland) Field Brigade, Royal Artillery
- 54th (West Riding & Staffordshire) Medium Brigade, Royal Garrison Artillery

== United States ==
- 54th Security Force Assistance Brigade

== See also ==
- 54th Division (disambiguation)
- 54th Regiment (disambiguation)
