= Oliva (singer) =

Colombian singer (born 1992)

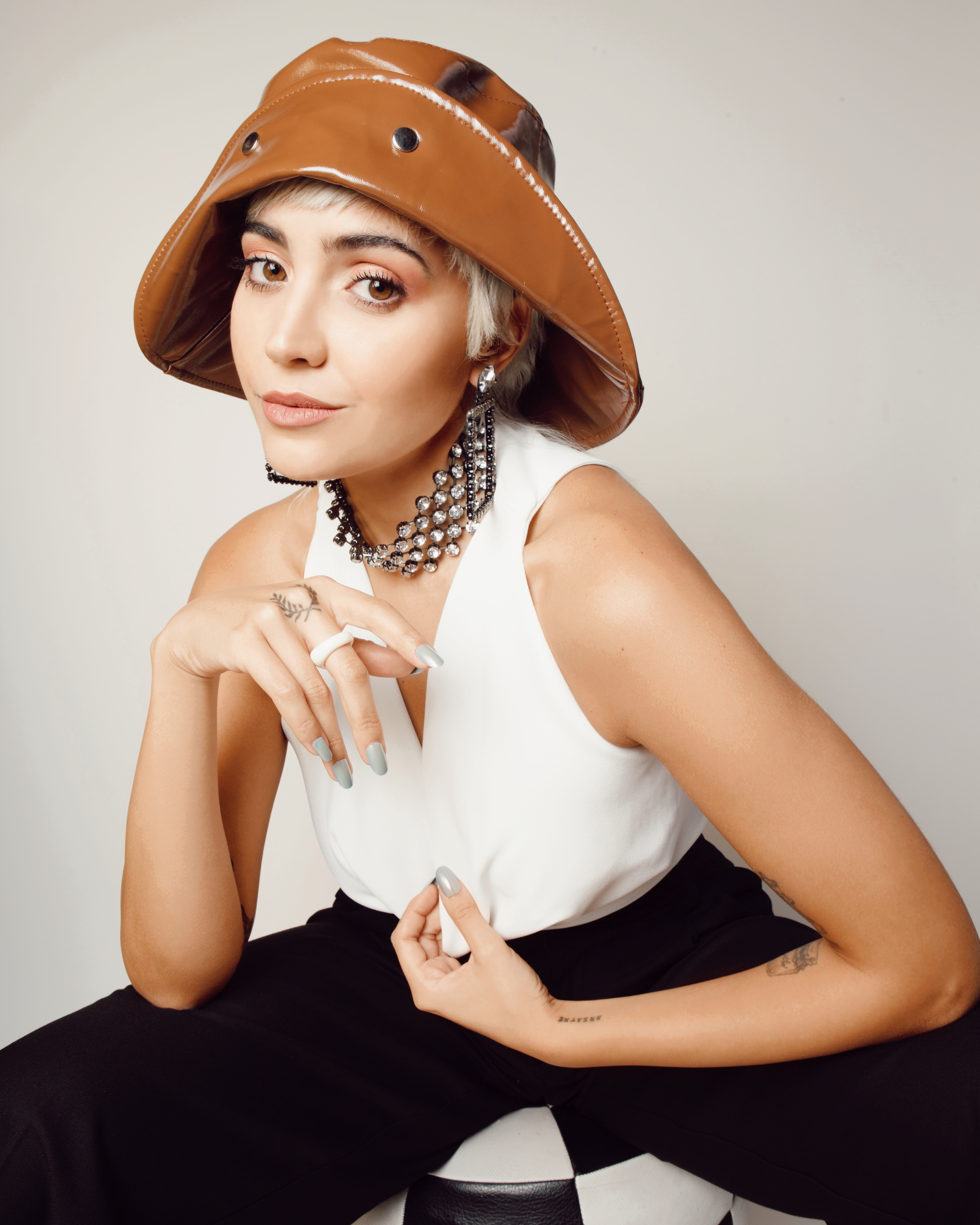
- Oliva in 2021

Background information
- Born: Alejandra Lozano Castellote; March 20, 1992 (age 34); Isla de San Andrés, Colombia
- Genres: Latin pop Dance Afrobeat
- Occupation: Singer
- Years active: 2016 – present
- Label: Sony Music Latin

Alejandra Lozano Castellote (born March 20, 1992), known as Oliva, is a Colombian singer, songwriter, and businesswoman of Latin pop, dance, and afrobeat. Of Spanish descent, she grew up on the island of Isla de San Andrés, Colombia and in Panama.

== Musical career ==
She made her debut as an artist in 2016 with the release of "Morning Light", a song that led her to start her solo career on the national electronic scene.

In 2017, she established himself as the vocalist of the duo Irie Kingz,, formed with his brother Yeyo, and released the singles "Me Want Party", "2 Yuh - Ft. Gyptian", "Bajo cero", "No Drama", "To The Top", "Química" and "Dime".

A year later, in 2018 she signed with the label Sony Music Colombia and the publisher Warner Chappell, and made her first tour of Colombia making 12 performances on the Moonlight Tour.

In 2019, after participating in the Estéreo Picnic Festival, the duo Irie Kingz concluded its activity as a musical group.

That same year, she collaborated with Rauw Alejandro on the song "Na´de Ti" marking the strongest precedent of his solo career.

In 2020 she released the singles Fashion Criminal,, "Sweet", "Destiny" and "Closer". In addition, she creates compositions in Spanish, English and Creole, which leads her to be part of the Green Moon Fest 2020 network.

In 2021, she signed for Sony Music Latin and produced her first 7-song EP "Retrofuturismo".

=== EP "Refrofuturismo" ===
Her first EP with Sony Music Latin, titled Refrofuturimo, with her songs and melodies takes the public from pleasure to grief and from sadness to joy. It includes 7 songs: Bailamos, Otra Vida, VIP, Ya Es Tarde, Que Mal, Cafeína and Quédate. The EP has influences from POP, Disco, R&B and Latin rhythms.

== Discography ==
=== EP ===
- "Retrofuturismo" (EP) (2021)

=== Songs ===
- "Morning Light", 2016
- "Fashion Criminal", 2020
- "Sweet", 2020
- "Destiny", 2020
- "Closer", 2020
- "Bailamos", 2021
- "Cafeína", 2022
- "Otra Vida", 2022

=== Fests ===
Year	Town	Fest
2018	San Andrés Island	Summer SAI Fest
2018	Medellín	La Solar Fest
2018	Medellín	BreakFest Colombia
2018	Miami	Dreezer Next Show case
2019	Bogotá	Estéreo Picnic Fest
2020	San Andrés Island	Green Moon Fest
