= 54th Division =

54th Division or 54th Infantry Division may refer to:

== Infantry divisions ==
- 54th Division (People's Republic of China)
- 54th Infantry Division (German Empire)
- 54th Reserve Division, German Empire
- 54th Infantry Division (India), India
- 54th Infantry Division "Napoli", Italy, World War II
- 54th Division (Imperial Japanese Army)
- 54th Infantry Division (Russian Empire)
- 54th Guards Rifle Division, Soviet Union, World War II
- 54th Motor Rifle Division, Soviet Union
- 54th Rifle Division, Soviet Union
- 54th Division (Spain)
- 54th Division (Syria)
- 54th (East Anglian) Infantry Division, United Kingdom, World Wars I and II

== Other divisions ==
- 54th Guards Rocket Division, Russia

== See also ==
- List of military divisions by number
- 54th Army (disambiguation)
- 54th Brigade (disambiguation)
- 54th Regiment (disambiguation)
- 54th Squadron (disambiguation)
