= 54th Regiment =

54th Regiment may refer to:

- 54th (City of London) Heavy Anti-Aircraft Regiment, Royal Artillery
- 54th (West Norfolk) Regiment of Foot
- 54th Foot, name of the 43rd (Monmouthshire) Regiment of Foot prior to 1751
- 54th Regiment of Foot, name of the 52nd (Oxfordshire) Regiment of Foot prior to 1756
- 54th Indiana Infantry Regiment
- 54th Infantry Regiment (France)
- 54th Infantry Regiment (Imperial Japanese Army)
- 54th Infantry Regiment (United States)
- 54th Massachusetts Infantry Regiment
- 54th Massachusetts Volunteer Regiment
- 54th New York Volunteer Infantry
- 54th Ohio Infantry
- 54th Pennsylvania Infantry Regiment
- 54th Regiment Kentucky Volunteer Mounted Infantry
- 54th United States Colored Infantry Regiment

== See also ==
- 54th Infantry Regiment (disambiguation)
- 54th Division (disambiguation)
