= R31-class airship =

R31 class
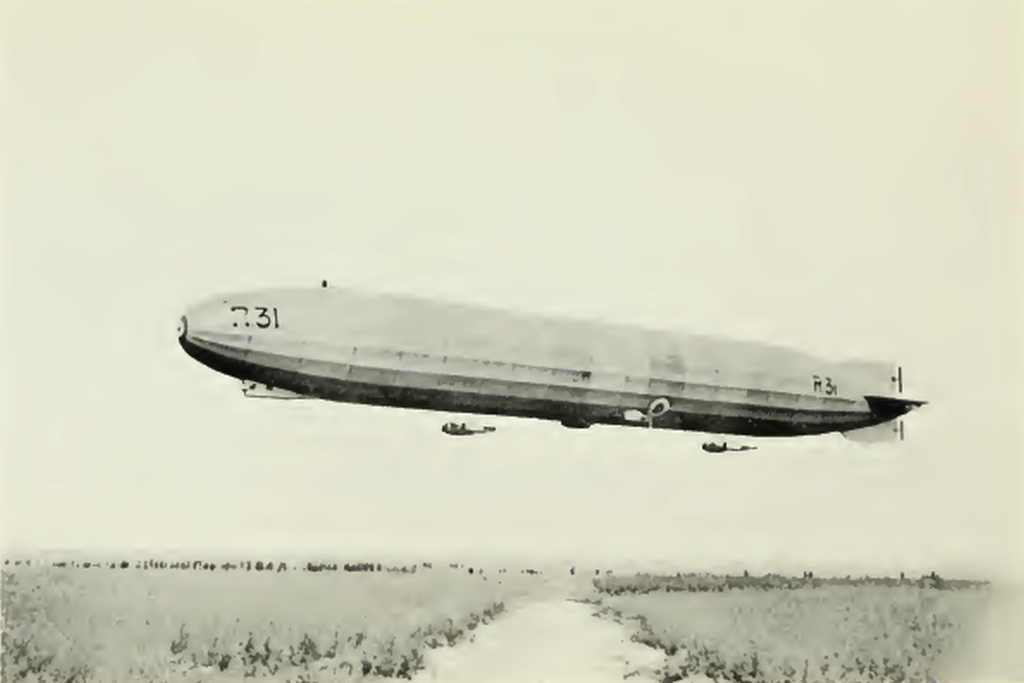

General information
- Type: Fleet defence airship
- National origin: United Kingdom
- Manufacturer: Short Brothers
- Primary user: Royal Navy
- Number built: 2

History
- First flight: July 1918

The R31 class of British rigid airships was constructed in the closing months of World War I, and comprised two aircraft, His Majesty's Airship R31 and R32. They were designed by the Royal Corps of Naval Constructors – with assistance from a Herr Müller who had defected to Britain, and previously worked for the Schütte-Lanz airship company – and built by Short Brothers at the Cardington airship sheds. The airship frame was made from spruce plywood laminated into girder sections, weatherproofed with varnish, and also fireproofed. These enclosed 21 gas bags. R31 was the largest British airship to fly before the end of the war, and the class remains one of the largest mobile wooden structures ever built. Only three German Schütte-Lanz S.L.20/21/22 (F-Klasse) airships were marginally larger.

As the airships were intended for fleet protection operations, they were to be fitted with defensive machine guns on top of the envelope, at the stern and in the gondolas. A 12-pounder gun was to be fitted in a special position centrally below the airship for use against U-boats. In the event, this armament was only fitted to R31, as R32 was only completed after the armistice with Germany. It had also been intended to fit a bomb load of two 520 lb (240 kg) bombs and four 230 lb (100 kg) bombs. With the end of hostilities, these were never installed on either airship.

== Operational history ==
=== R31 ===
R31 made its first trial flight, lasting two hours, in July 1918, under the command of Squadron Leader W.C. Hinks. A top speed of 70 mph (110 km/h) was achieved, well above the expected 50–55 mph (80–89 km/h), and faster than any other airship then in service. It was originally powered by six 275 hp (205 kW) Rolls-Royce Eagle engines, but in view of the performance and to reduce fuel consumption, one was removed, reducing the maximum speed to a still satisfactory 65 mph (105 km/h); similarly, the R32 was built with six engines, and later converted to a five-engine configuration.

The R31 airship was finally commissioned on 6 November 1918, just before the armistice with Germany, after having spent four hours in the air. It set off, again under the command of Squadron Leader Hincks, for the airship base at East Fortune in Scotland. On the journey, she encountered bad weather, and it was feared that some of the plywood girders were failing, so she diverted to the airship base at Howden in the East Riding of Yorkshire for examination and repair. The sheds had not been repaired since the R27 had caught fire three months earlier, and the roof leaked badly. This caused the glue holding the plywood together to deteriorate; as a result the airship became unairworthy, and was beyond repair. In February 1919, it was dismantled. The covering was removed and returned to Cardington, while the frames were sold for £200; these were broken up and sold for firewood, but due to the fireproofing treatment they had received, they would not burn.

=== R32 ===
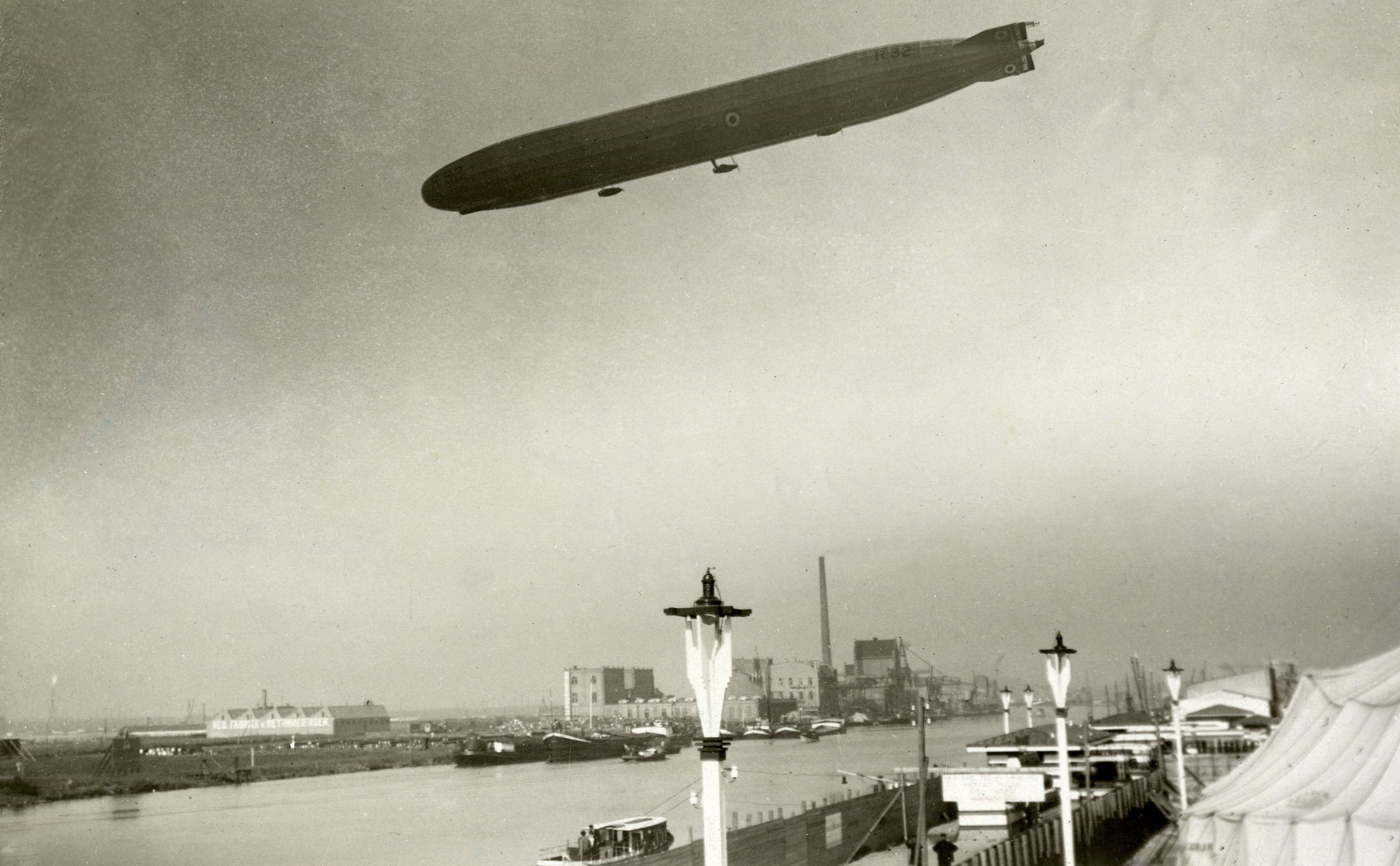
R32 above Amsterdam

After being formally accepted by the Royal Navy, R32 made its first trial flight on 3 September 1919, and then on 6 September went to RNAS Pulham, Norfolk. On 10 September, in formation with the R33, she made a flight over the Netherlands, Belgium and Northern France and back to Pulham. In October 1919, the R32 with the rest of the airship fleet was formally handed over to the Royal Air Force. The airship was used by the National Physical Laboratory for structural testing. On 20 March 1920, it was flown to Howden to be refurbished and used for crew training by the American party, who had come to accept the R38 (ZR-2). When the metal-framed R80 became available, the use of the by now obsolete wooden-framed R32 stopped, and, to save money, it was decommissioned and used to assess the effect of a gas-bag bursting. Once the covering had been removed, and the engines taken away, cell No.18 was over pressurised until the expansion caused the bracing and structure to fail. The frame was subsequently dismantled.

== Operators ==
Royal Navy

== Specifications (with five engines) ==
Data from

General characteristics

- Length: 615 ft 0 in (187.5 m)
- Diameter: 65 ft 6 in (19.97 m)
- Volume: 1,547,000 cu ft (43,976 m^{3})
- Useful lift: 36,960 lb (16,800 kg)
- Powerplant: 5 × Rolls-Royce Eagle piston engine, 275 hp (205 kW) each

Performance

- Maximum speed: 65 mph (104 km/h, 56 kn)
