= Maitland =

Maitland may refer to:

== Places ==
=== Australia ===
- Maitland, New South Wales, a city
  - City of Maitland, the city's local government area
- Maitland, South Australia, a town
- Maitland, Tasmania, a rural locality
- Lake Maitland, a dry lake in Western Australia

=== Canada ===
- Maitland, Nova Scotia, an unincorporated community
- Maitland, Ontario, a village
- Maitland, Huron County, Ontario
- Maitland Volcano, an extinct volcano in British Columbia

=== United States ===
- Maitland, Florida, a city
- Maitland, Missouri, a city
- Maitland, Pennsylvania, a census-designated place
- Maitland, South Dakota, a ghost town
- Maitland, West Virginia, an unincorporated community

=== Elsewhere ===
- Maitland, New Zealand, a rural community
- Maitland, Cape Town, a suburb of Cape Town, South Africa

== Rivers ==
- Maitland River (Western Australia)
- Maitland River, Ontario, Canada
- Maitland River (South Africa), a river in South Africa

== Other uses ==
- Maitland (1811 ship)
- Maitland (1870 ship)
- Maitland (surname), an English and Scottish surname
- Clan Maitland, a Lowland Scottish clan
- HMAS Maitland, a ship and a shore base of the Royal Australian Navy
- Maitland, a building of Somerville College, Oxford
- Disappearance of Brianna Maitland, in 2004
- Maitland Ward, American actress and model

== See also ==
- Maitland River (disambiguation)
