= Lilias =

Lilias or Lillias is a feminine given name. Notable people with the name include:

- Lilias Armstrong (1882 – 1937), British phonetician
- Lilias Craven, fictional character in the children's novel The Secret Garden (1911)
- Lilias Farley (1907–1989), Canadian artist
- Lilias Folan (20th century), television show host
- Lilias Mary Gower (1877 – 1959), Welsh croquet player
- Lillias MacDonald (1885–1961), American college dean
- Lilias Mackinnon (1889–1974) Scottish pianist
- Lillias Maitland (1862–1932), one of the first women graduates from a Scottish university, University of Edinburgh 1893
- Lilias Massey, Chatelaine of Rideau Hall
- Lilias Torrance Newton (1896 – 1980), Canadian painter
- Lilias Trotter (1853 – 1928), Christian missionary in Algeria
- Lillias Hamilton (1858 – 1925), British doctor
- Lilias Rider Haggard (1892 – 1968), English writer
- Lillias Rumsey Sanford (1850 – 1940), founder of Rumsey Hall School
- Lillias Margaret Skene (1867 – 1957), Australian feminist
- Lillias White, American actress
