= Rumsey Hall =

Rumsey Hall can refer to:

- Rumsey Hall School
- Rumsey Hall (Cornwall, Connecticut), one of the school's early buildings, now demolished
- Rumsey Hall (Shepherdstown, West Virginia)
