= J. E. M. Pritchard =

British military officer

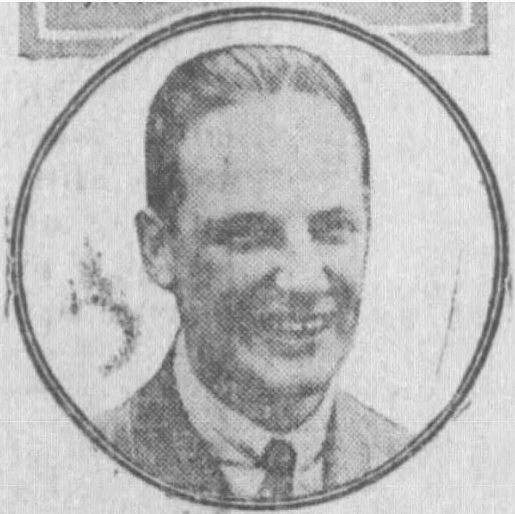
- Born: 1889; Leighton Buzzard, Bedfordshire
- Died: 24 August 1921 (aged 31–32); Hull, Yorkshire
- Military career
- Allegiance: United Kingdom
- Branch: Royal Naval Air Service; Royal Air Force
- Service years: 1915–1921
- Rank: Major
- Conflicts: World War I
- Awards: Officer of the Order of British Empire; Air Force Cross
- Memorials: R.38, Hull Western Cemetery

Major John Edward Maddock Pritchard OBE AFC (1889 – 24 August 1921), was a British military officer who served in the RNAS, commanding non-rigid airships, and later in the Royal Air Force. He was the first pilot to navigate arrival in the United States by air from Europe. Pritchard was killed when the airship R.38 broke its back and exploded in 1921.

== Early life ==
Pritchard was born in Leighton Buzzard, Bedfordshire, in 1889. His father was of Welsh origin, but was born in the United States, and fought there during the Civil War.

He was educated privately and at Trinity College, Cambridge. Following a post-graduate course at the Royal School of Mines, he was elected a Fellow of the Geological Society of London and took up a career as a mining engineer.

== World War 1 ==
When World War I broke out Pritchard joined the Royal Naval Air Service and was posted to the Kite and Balloon School at Roehampton. In 1915 he was posted to the Airship Station at Kingsnorth and then to Polegate, where he commanded an S.S. Zero class airship. Early in 1916 he was posted to Mudros in the Eastern Mediterranean to command S.S.6, in which he set a Mediterranean airship record with a flight lasting 8 hours. At the end of 1916 he was again posted to Polegate as Senior Flying and Experimental Officer. In January 1917 he was posted to East Fortune as Commanding Officer of the Coastal class airship C.24 . Two months later he was transferred to Howden as Commanding Officer of the Parseval airship P.6 and in August he was posted to Cranwell. In September 1917 he was posted to the Admiralty Airship Department, where his duties included examining the remains German airships which had been brought down, much of the data gathered being used in the design of British rigid airships. He also translated any documents that were found.

== Post-war career ==
After the Armistice Pritchard was the Admiralty Airship Representative at the Paris Peace Conference. He was promoted to Acting Major with effect from 1 May 1919. He was a member of the crew of R.34 on its transatlantic flight, and on the airship's arrival in America parachuted from it to give instructions to the ground handling party, making him the first person to arrive in the United States by air. From October 1919 he performed technical flying duties for the Airship Experimental and Research Division of the Air Ministry. He was elected an associate Fellow of the Royal Aeronautical Society in 1920 and contributed articles on airship development to Flight and also gave lectures on the subject. Pritchard was greatly interested in engine development, and was an advocate of the use of heavy oil diesel engines for airship work, believing that the greatest danger to airships was from petrol fumes and not from the hydrogen.

He was responsible for the flight-testing program of the R.38, although his wishes to subject the airship to a prolonged series of tests before delivery were over-ruled by the Air Ministry. He also maintained that turning tests should not be performed at low altitude, but should follow the German practice of performing these trials at over 7,000 ft (2,100 m). On the airship's fourth flight it broke its back during a series of sharp turns at 2,500 ft (760 m) while over the Humber Estuary, killing 44 of the 49 on board, including Pritchard. His body was never recovered.

== Awards ==
Pritchard was appointed OBE in June 1919 and awarded the Air Force Cross for "distinguished service during and after the War" in December 1919.
