= Pulham St Mary =

Village in Norfolk, England

Coordinates: 52.420°N 1.253°E

Pulham Saint Mary
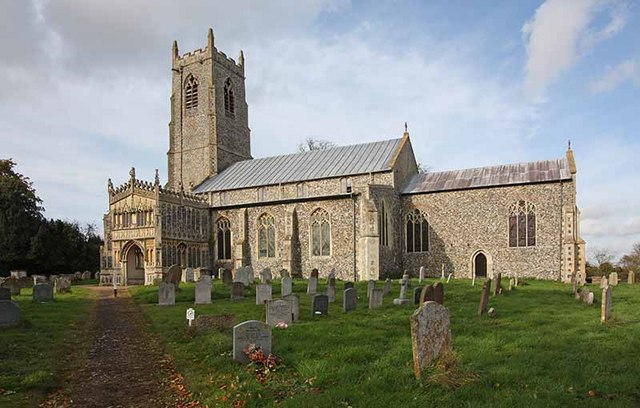
- St Mary's Church, Pulham St Mary

- Location within Norfolk
- Area: 12.26 km^{2} (4.73 sq mi)
- Population: 892
  - Density: 73/km^{2} (190/sq mi)
- OS grid reference: TM212851
- Civil parish: Pulham St Mary
- District: South Norfolk
- Shire county: Norfolk
- Region: East
- Country: England
- Sovereign state: United Kingdom
- Post town: DISS
- Postcode district: IP21
- Dialling code: 01379
- Police: Norfolk
- Fire: Norfolk
- Ambulance: East of England
- UK Parliament: South Norfolk

Pulham Saint Mary is a village and civil parish in the South Norfolk district, in Norfolk, England, that lies next to the village of Pulham Market. It is situated approximately 8 miles (13 km) northeast of Diss and 15 miles (24 km) south of Norwich, covers an area of 12.26 km^{2} (4.73 sq mi) and a population of 892 at the 2011 census.

== History ==
The parish church, dedicated to St. Mary the Virgin, which gives the village the St Mary in its name, is believed to date from around 1258. The parish church is of flint construction with parts that date back to the thirteenth century.

Older maps and documents name the parish or village "Pulham Saint Mary the Virgin" - the latter two words are in modern times dropped, and Saint is typically abbreviated. The neighbouring parish and village, now called Pulham Market, was historically known as "Pulham Saint Mary Magdalene" after the dedication of its parish church.

The earliest recorded spelling is Polleham. Pulham is referenced in the Domesday Book of 1086 as a single manor (Pulham St Mary with what is today called Pulham Market) and being part of the Earsham hundred. The name Pulham is thought to mean the farmhouse, homestead or enclosure by the pool, water meadow or stream. There is a 'beck' (Norfolk dialect for a small watercourse) that flows by both villages.

In modern times the two villages of Pulham St Mary and Pulham Market are often together described as The Pulhams, including on road signs in the surrounding areas.

The Romans may have had a settlement in Pulham St Mary as pieces of Roman tile, coin and oyster shells have been found in the area.

The village was well known in medieval times as a centre for hat-making, and the ancient Guild of St James the Lesser established the Guild Chapel, now forming part of The Pennoyer Centre.

The nearest railway station is Diss. Until its closure in 1953, Pulham St Mary railway station was a stop on the Waveney Valley Line; the station has since been demolished and the railway has been lifted.

The village was struck by an F0/T1 tornado on 23 November 1981, as part of the record-breaking nationwide tornado outbreak on that day. Another tornado had earlier struck Pulham Market.

== RNAS Pulham and the "Pulham Pigs" ==
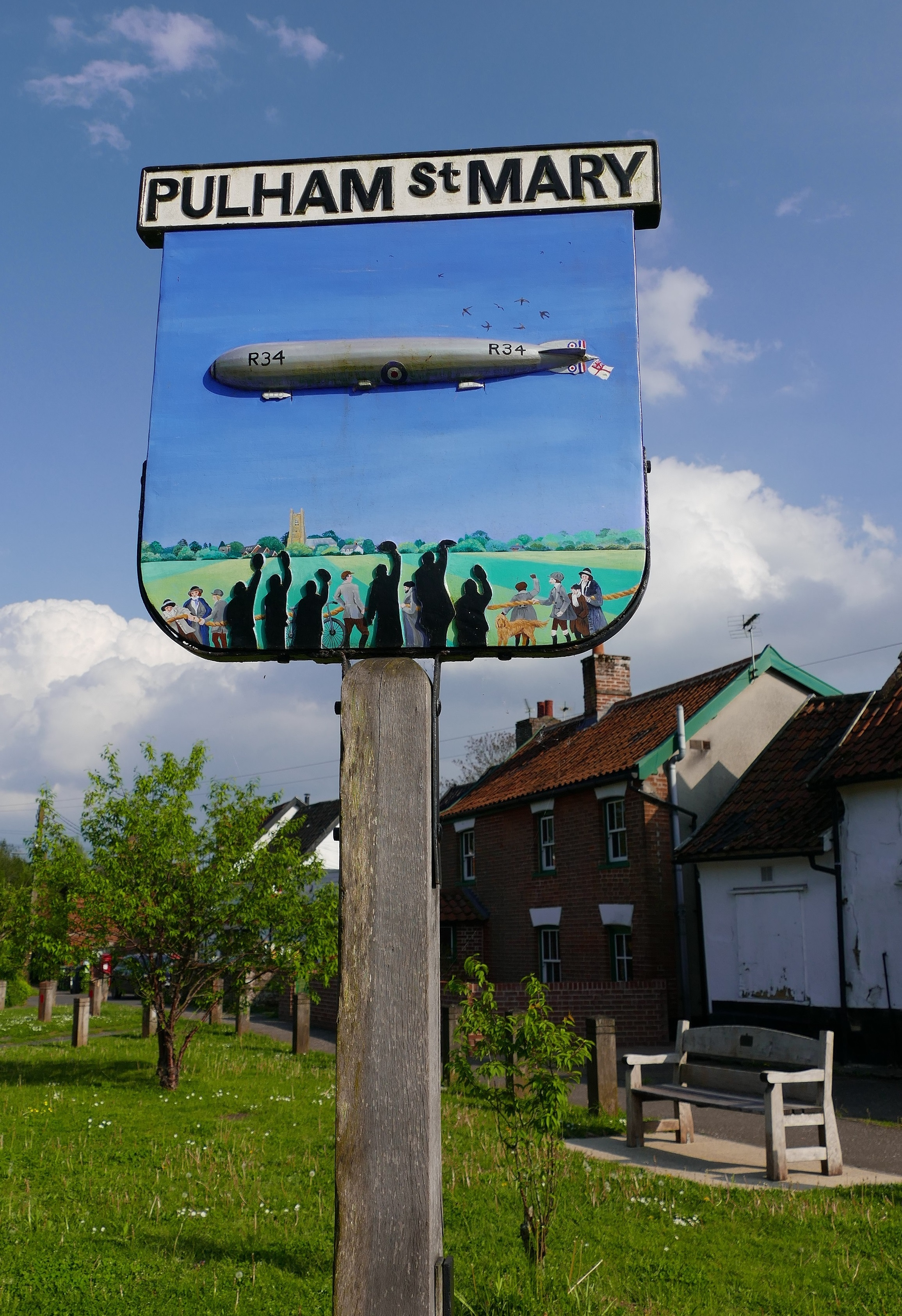
The village sign depicts the airship R34

In 1912 under conditions of secrecy a large base, RNAS Pulham, was constructed for the operation of airships. The airships were locally given the nickname of "Pulham Pigs". RNAS Pulham operated as a Royal Navy base until 1918 when it was transferred to the new Royal Air Force. In 1917 two large steel-framed sheds were erected and in 1919 a 120-foot (37 m)-high mooring mast joined them. Following its historic both-way Atlantic crossing the R34 returned to Pulham. The large rigid airships R33, R36 and R38 also visited. The base's airship hangar was dismantled in 1928 and re-erected at Cardington. In the early 1920s a radio direction finding station was located there that helped give accurate position reports for aircraft flying to Croydon airport. The base became disused in the early 1930s after the crash of the R101 when all work stopped in Britain on airships, although it continued as an RAF property until 1958.

During World War II it was a dump for crashed aircraft from all over the east of England; parts were salvaged for reuse. Munitions testing was also conducted on the site.

== Transport ==
As of May 2024, the 36A/B bus service run by FirstGroup links the town of Harleston and Norwich City Centre, passing through the village; on weekdays there is a limited 584 service to Diss, run by Simonds CountryLink.

== The Pennoyer Centre ==
In 1670 William Pennoyer, a puritan merchant, left money to pay for a schoolmaster to teach poor children in the village. (Pennoyer also left money to establish a scholarship at Harvard University in the USA, which remains in place today.)

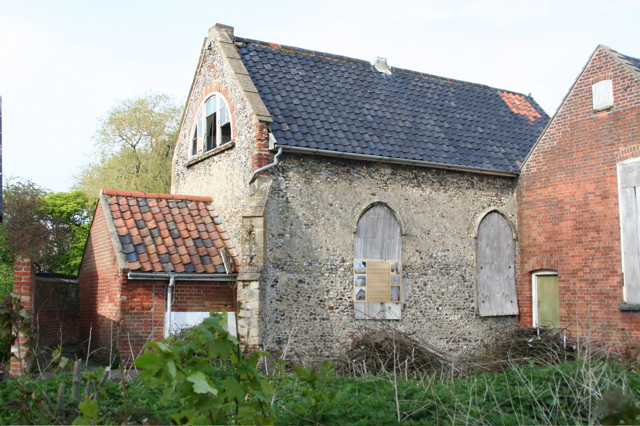
The Guild Chapel, prior to its 2010 restoration; it is now part of the village social hub

The school was significantly expanded in the Victorian period. When the school finally closed in 1988, it was the longest-running free elementary school in the country. Most primary-age children in the village now attend the school in neighbouring Pulham Market, and a cycle path built for this purpose runs adjacent to the road connecting the two villages.

The Victorian frontage of the building concealed a listed medieval Guild Chapel dating from 1401, making it an expensive proposition for renovation and alternative use. Pennoyer's thus lay unused for almost two decades. In 2006, however, the building was entered in the third series of the BBC's Restoration Village programme in an attempt to secure the necessary funds to transform the building into a new village centre.

Although Pennoyer's School did not make the final of Restoration Village, the project remained on track, receiving almost £1m in funding from the Heritage Lottery Fund and £210,000 from Norfolk's Investing in Communities programme. Construction work began in February 2009, and The Pennoyer Centre, complete with a 21st Century extension, and new facilities such a cafe and internet suite, opened in July 2010 for education, business, social and recreational use. The parish council meet there.
