= R80 (airship) =

British rigid airship

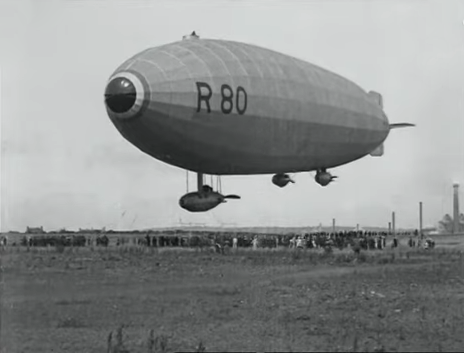
- The airship taking off.

General information
- National origin: United Kingdom
- Manufacturer: Vickers
- Designer: Barnes Wallis
- Number built: 1

History
- First flight: 19 July 1920

The R.80 was a British rigid airship, first flown on 19 July 1920, and was the first fully streamlined airship to be built in Britain. Originally a military project for the British Admiralty, it was completed for commercial passenger-carrying. R.80 proved too small for this role and after being used briefly to train the United States Navy personnel who were to crew the ZR-2 airship, R.80 was retired and eventually scrapped in 1925.

== Development ==
Construction was begun by Vickers in their airship shed at Walney Island, Barrow-in-Furness, in November 1917 to a design by Barnes Wallis and H. B. Pratt. Vickers had originally contracted to build R.37, but due to a lack of vacant sheds and a war-time steel shortage preventing construction of a new larger one, the smaller shed at Walney was used instead. This had been used to build R.27 and R.29, and the size of the R.80 was limited by the small size of the shed.

Work progressed slowly due to labour shortages, and with the end of the First World War, the future of military airships was reviewed. The Air Ministry stopped the work in the summer of 1919 as it was considered that the ship was no longer of military or commercial value. Vickers continued to fit out the ship with commercial objectives in mind but the scheme fell through. Co-designer H. B. Pratt completed a report envisaging an intercity European flight route, similar to that being run by the Zeppelin company:

"The route chosen to Rome is 1,000 land miles which is within the endurance of the ship. It is expected that the ship will fly at a maximum height of 2,000 ft. The route will carry the ship over south England, then over the English Channel to Paris on a direct route. The ship will then deliver mail and passengers, and then pass down in a continued south easterly direction towards Lyon. Passing over Lyon, the ship will turn south through the Rhone Valley and the continue to Nice. At Nice on the French Coast, the ship will turn easterly and skirt the coast and head towards Rome over the sea. The return course will be via the same route."

== Operational history ==
The outer cover was completed in April 1920 and by June the ship was finished. On 19 July, R.80 emerged from its shed for its first flight. Unfortunately it was damaged on the trial flight as it had not been properly ballasted and the lifting gas heated causing the ship to rise too fast. The result was extensive buckling of the framework. The ship was returned to its shed to be repaired, which took until January 1921. After further test flights the airship flew to the airship station at Howden, East Yorkshire in February where it was used for training the United States personnel who would crew the R.38 (ZR-2). The US Navy made four flights in the ship totalling some 8 hours 45 minutes between 26 March 1921 and 1 June 1921.

After these flights R.80 was flown to RNAS Pulham, Norfolk. There the airframe was used for stress analysis and destructive testing before being dismantled in 1925. In total, this relatively small but well-designed craft flew for only 73 hours.

Although the trials had been successful it was too small for its intended use. Many lessons were learnt, and incorporated in the design for the R100. One of the lasting innovations introduced by Barnes Wallis during construction was the first use ever of colour-coded wiring for the electrical systems of an aircraft.

== Specifications ==
Construction sheet of R80.

Data from

General characteristics

- Length: 535 ft 0 in (163 m)
- Height: 70 ft 0 in (21 m)
- Volume: 1,260,000 cu ft (35,700 m^{3})
- Gross weight: 85,680 lb (38,950 kg)
- Useful lift: 33,260 lb (15,100 kg)
- Powerplant: 4 × Wolseley-built Maybach engines (Maybach Mb.IVa) , 240 hp (180 kW) each

Performance

- Maximum speed: 70 mph (113 km/h, 61 kn)
