= R33-class airship =

Class of British rigid airships within the Royal Naval Air Service during WWI

R33-class
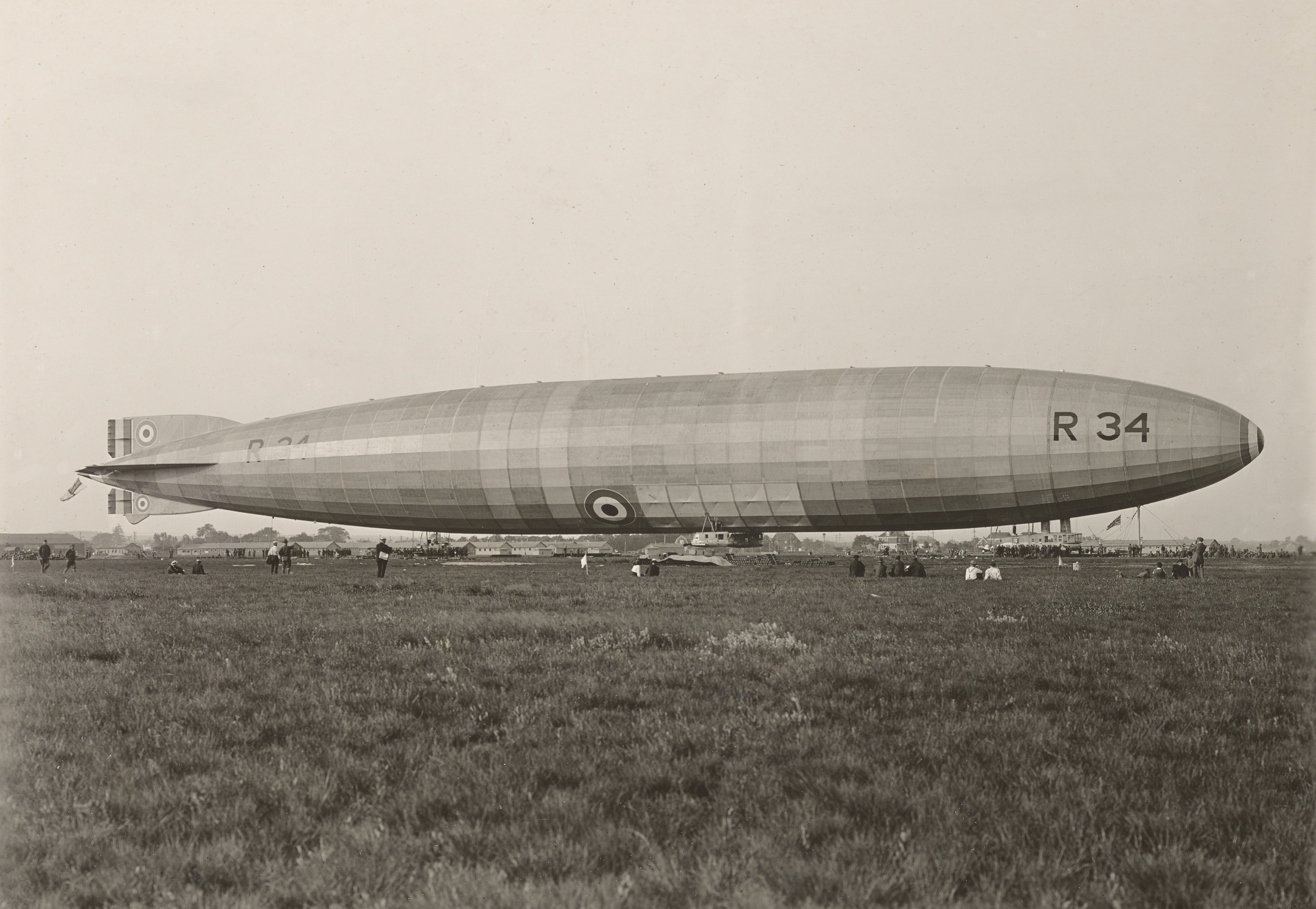
- The R33-class airship R-34 landing at Roosevelt Field in 1919

General information
- Type: Patrol airship
- National origin: United Kingdom
- Manufacturer: Armstrong Whitworth (R33); Beardmore (R34)
- Primary user: Royal Naval Air Service (to 1918); Royal Air Force (1918 onwards)
- Number built: 2

History
- First flight: 6 March 1919
- Developed from: R31 class airship
- Developed into: R36

The R.33 class of British rigid airships were built for the Royal Naval Air Service during the First World War, but were not completed until after the end of hostilities, by which time the RNAS had become part of the Royal Air Force. The lead ship, R.33, served successfully for ten years and also survived one of the most alarming incidents in airship history when she was torn from her mooring mast in a gale. She was called a "Pulham Pig" by the locals, as the blimps based there had been, and is immortalised in the village sign for Pulham St Mary. The only other airship in the class, R.34, became the first aircraft to make an east to west transatlantic flight in July 1919 and, with the return flight, made the first two-way crossing. It was decommissioned two years later, after being damaged during a storm. The crew nicknamed her "Tiny".

== Design and development ==
Substantially larger than the preceding R31 class, the R.33 class was in the design stage in 1916 when the German Zeppelin LZ 76 (L 33) was brought down on English soil. Despite the efforts of the crew to set it on fire, it was captured nearly intact, with engines in working order. For five months, the LZ 76 was carefully examined in order to discover the Germans' secrets.

The existing design was adapted to produce a new airship based on the German craft and two examples were ordered, one (R.33) to be constructed by Armstrong-Whitworth at Barlow, North Yorkshire, and the other (R.34) by William Beardmore and Company in Inchinnan, Renfrewshire, Scotland. Assembly began in 1918. The R.33 class was semi-streamlined fore and aft, the middle section being straight-sided. The control car was well forward on the ship, with the aft section containing an engine in a separate structure to stop vibrations affecting the sensitive radio direction finding and communication equipment. The small gap was faired over, so the gondola seemed to be a single structure. It was powered by five 275 hp (205 kW) Sunbeam Maori engines, with one in the aft section of the control car, two more in a pair of power cars amidships each driving a pusher propeller via a reversing gearbox for manoeuvering while mooring, and the remaining two in a centrally mounted aft car, geared together to drive a single pusher propeller.

== Operational history ==
=== R.33 ===
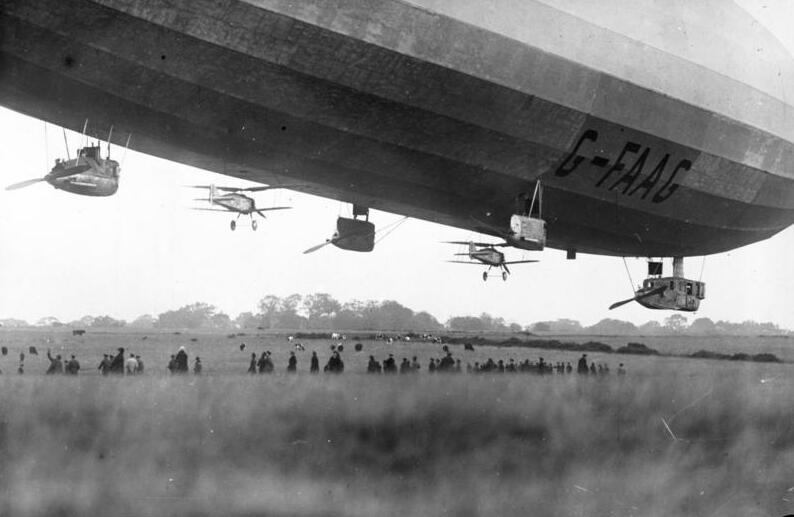
The pair of Gloster Grebes under the airship before the test, 26 October 1926

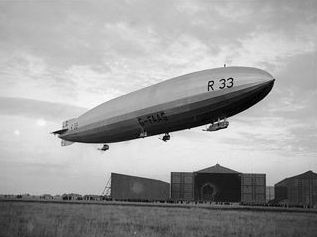
R33 near its hangar

R.33 first flew on 6 March 1919, and was sent to RAF Pulham in Norfolk. Between then and 14 October, R.33 made 23 flights totalling 337 hours flying time. One of these, a flight promoting "Victory Bonds", included a brass band playing in the top machine gun post.

In 1920, the R.33 was decommissioned and given over to commercial work with the civil registration G-FAAG displayed on her sides and a large "G" (Great Britain) painted on her tail fins. Civilian modifications to the airship included sleeping accommodations and a galley. R.33 was flown to Pulham and mainly used for trials of new mast mooring techniques. On one occasion winds of 80 mph (130 km/h) were successfully withstood while moored. In May 1920, the R.33 flew to Howden Air Station to participate in an experiment carrying a pilotless Sopwith Camel, which was successfully launched over the Yorkshire Moors. After a structural and mechanical overhaul, R.33 was based at Croydon Airport, moored to a portable mast. In June 1921, the Metropolitan Police engaged R.33 to observe traffic conditions during Epsom and Ascot race weeks, and in July she appeared in the Hendon Air Pageant.

In September 1920, the British government cancelled all future airship development for financial reasons. Military airships were scrapped, but as a civilian airship R.33 was mothballed instead; she remained in her shed at Cardington, Bedfordshire for nearly four years. The reconditioned R.33 emerged from the Cardington shed on 2 April 1925.

On the night of 16 April 1925, at 9:15 pm the R.33 was torn from the mast at Pulham during a gale and was carried away with only a partial crew of 20 men on board. Her nose partially collapsed from impace with the mooring arm and the first gas cell deflated leaving her low in the bow. The crew on board started the engines, gaining some height, and rigged a cover for the bow section from the deflated bag, but the R.33 was blown out over the North Sea. The Royal Navy sloop HMS Godetia was readied and left the nearby port of Lowestoft in case the R.33 came down in the sea. The local lifeboat was launched as well.

Some five hours after the initial break from the mast, R.33 was under control but still being blown towards the Continent. As she approached the Dutch coast, the R.33 was being pelted by heavy rain and came dangerously close to crashing into the sea; everything possible was thrown overboard, including parachutes and fire extinguishers. The rain stopped and the airship was able to check her descent. The R.33 was given the option of landing at De Kooy, where a party of 300 men was standing by. Late in the evening R.33 was able to hold her position over the Dutch coast, hovering there until weather conditions eased early on 17 April, when she began the slow journey back across the North Sea. R.33 crossed the Suffolk coast at 13:00 hrs, and the airship landed back at Pulham at 13:20 hrs, and was placed into the shed at 13:50 hrs.

For their actions the airship's first officer, who had been in command, Lieutenant Ralph Booth was awarded the Air Force Cross, the coxswain, Flight-Sergeant "Sky" Hunt, was awarded the Air Force Medal, four other crew members were awarded the British Empire Medal and the other crew members were presented with inscribed watches.

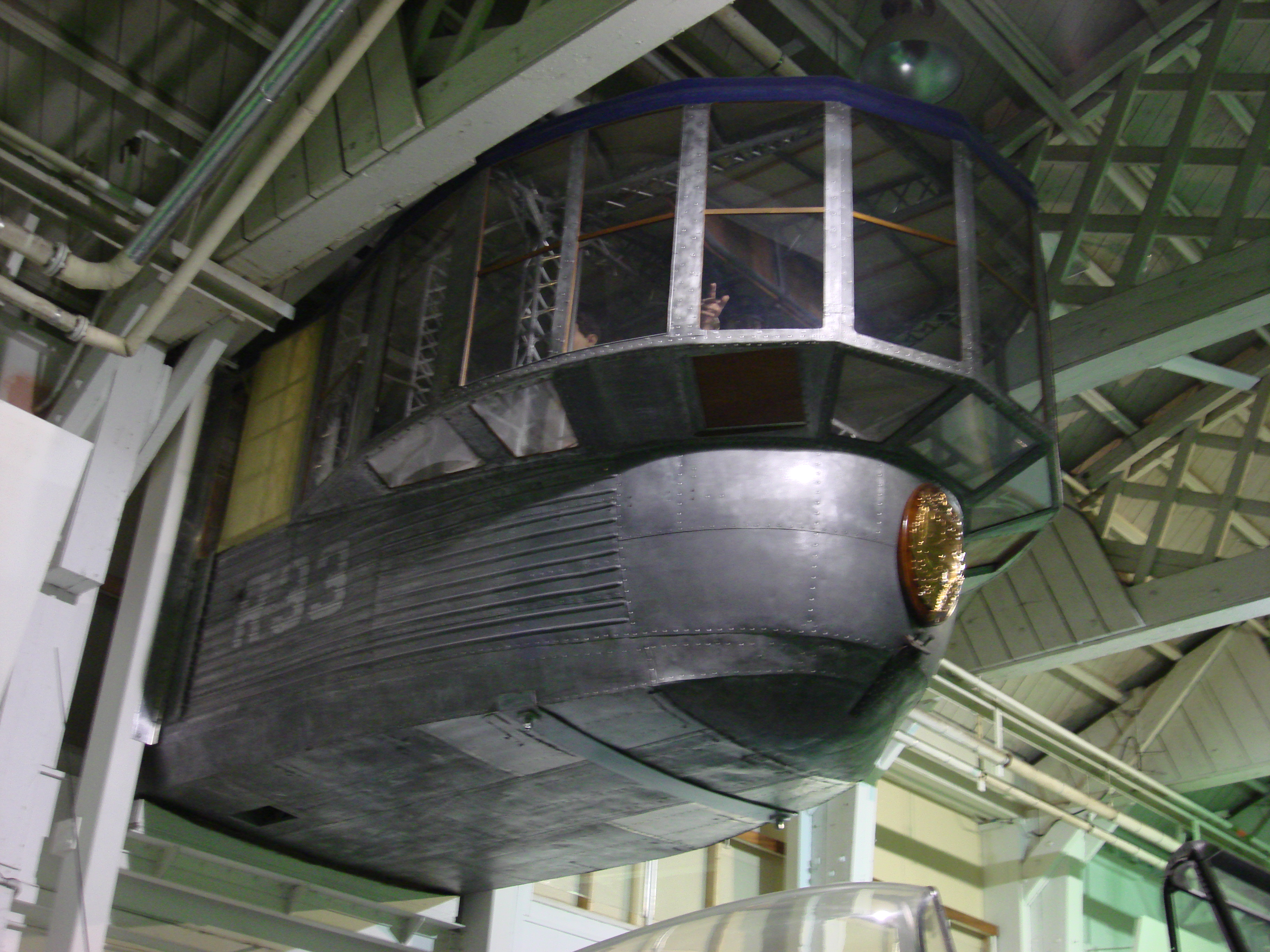
The forward section of R.33 control car at Royal Air Force Museum London (Hendon), 2008

On 5 October 1925, following repairs, R.33 emerged from her shed for the first time since April. She was used for pressure experiments to provide data for the construction of the new R101 airship. Once these were finished, she was used for trials launching a parasite fighter, using a DH 53 Hummingbird light aircraft. After two failed attempts in October, a successful launch and recapture was achieved in December of that year. This was the last flight of the R.33 for over ten months, as she returned to her shed for an overhaul. On 21 October 1926, she launched a pair of Gloster Grebes weighing about a ton apiece, the first of which was flown by Flying Officer Campbell MacKenzie-Richards. Two more Grebes were launched from R.33 on 23 November 1926. R.33 was then returned to her shed at Pulham where she remained until 1928; following an examination of her framework that revealed severe metal fatigue, she was dismantled and scrapped. The forward portion of R.33's control car is currently on display at the Royal Air Force Museum London at Hendon.

=== R.34 ===
R.34 made her first flight on 14 March 1919 and was delivered to her service base at RAF East Fortune near Edinburgh on 29 May after a 21-hour flight from Inchinnan. R.34 had set out the previous evening, but thick fog made navigation difficult, and after spending the night over the North Sea the airship was unable to moor in the morning due to fog. After cruising as far south as Yorkshire R.34 returned to East Fortune to dock at about 3 p.m. The airship made her first endurance trip of 56 hours over the Baltic from 17 to 20 June.

It was then decided to attempt the first return Atlantic crossing, under the command of Major George Scott. R.34 had not been designed as a passenger airship and extra sleeping accommodations for the crew were added by slinging hammocks along the keel walkway. Tables and wash basins were installed along with lightweight curtains to help stop the drafts in the interior of the ship. The bomb racks were removed and replaced with lockers for food and water. A metal plate was welded to an engine exhaust pipe to allow for the preparation of hot food which included beef stew, ham, eggs, beans and potatoes. 24 additional fuel tanks were placed along the keel, increasing the total fuel capacity to around 6,000 gallons (22,712 liters).

The crew included Brigadier-General Edward Maitland and Lieutenant Commander Zachary Lansdowne as the representative of the US Navy. William Ballantyne, one of the crew members scheduled to stay behind to save weight, stowed away with the crew's mascot, a small tabby kitten called "Whoopsie" (or "Wopsie"); they emerged at 2.00 p.m. on the first day, too late to be dropped off. As was the norm with stowaways, Ballantyne was put to work for his passage, serving as the airship's cook and assisting in pumping the extra gasoline by hand into the fuel tanks. Ballantyne was not allowed to make the return flight and was sent home to England by ship; he was suspended from flight duty for one year.

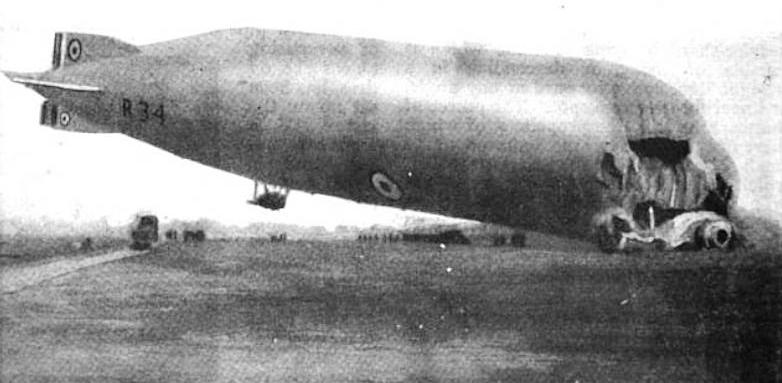
The wreck of the R.34 at RNAS Howden in East Yorkshire 29 January 1921

R.34 left East Fortune, Scotland, on 2 July 1919 and arrived at Mineola, Long Island, United States, on 6 July after a flight of 108 hours, with only a few gallons of fuel remaining. R.34 was the first aircraft of any type to carry passengers across the Atlantic. As the landing party had no experience of handling large rigid airships, Major E. M. Pritchard jumped by parachute and so became the first person to reach American soil by air from Europe. This was the first East-West aerial crossing of the Atlantic and was achieved weeks after the first transatlantic aeroplane flight by British aviators Captain John Alcock and Lieutenant Arthur Whitten Brown in a modified First World War Vickers Vimy. The return journey to RNAS Pulham took place from 10 to 13 July and took 75 hours. Returned to East Fortune for a refit, R.34 then flew to Howden, East Yorkshire, for crew training.

On 27 January 1921 R.34 set off on what should have been a routine exercise. Over the North Sea the weather worsened and a recall signal sent by radio was not received. Following a navigational error the craft flew into a hillside on the North Yorkshire Moors during the night, and the ship lost two propellers. She went back out to sea using the two remaining engines and in daylight followed the Humber Estuary back to Howden. Strong winds made it impossible to get her back into the shed, and she was tied down outside for the night. By the morning further damage had occurred and R.34 was officially decommissioned and scrapped.

== Operators ==
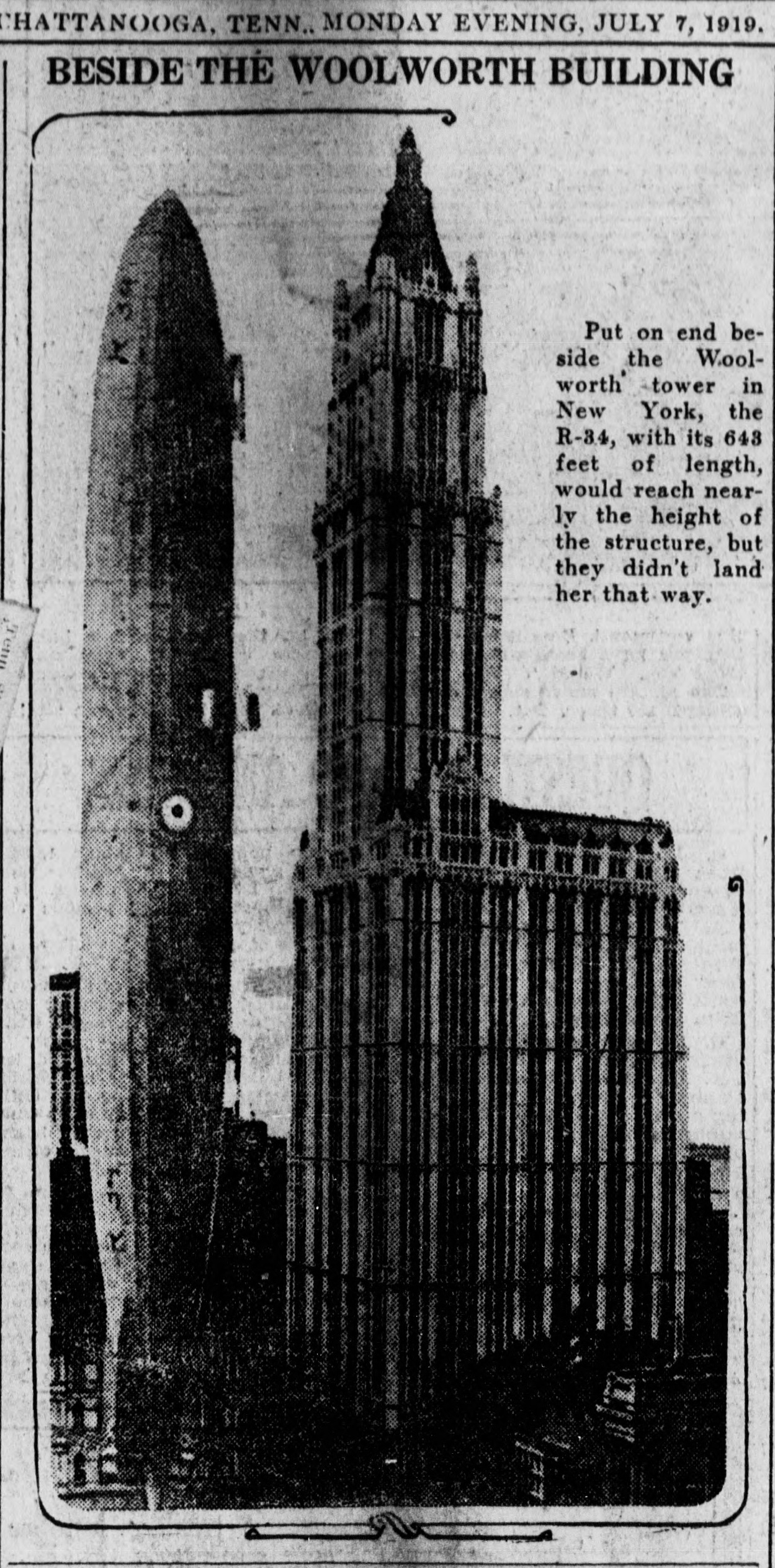
R-34 compared to the Woolworth Building, the world's tallest structure in 1919

- Royal Navy (to 1918)
- Royal Air Force (from 1918)

== Specifications ==
Data from Airship Heritage Trust

General characteristics

- Crew: 26
- Length: 643 ft 0 in (195.99 m)
- Diameter: 79 ft 0 in (24.08 m)
- Volume: 1,950,000 cu ft (55,000 m^{3})
- Useful lift: 58,240 lb (26,420 kg)
- Powerplant: 5 × Sunbeam Maori , 275 hp (205 kW) each

Performance

- Maximum speed: 62 mph (100 km/h, 54 kn)

== See also ==
Related development

- Timeline of hydrogen technologies
- Walter Wellman

== Bibliography ==
- Abbott, Patrick. Airship the Story of R.34 and the First East-West Crossing of the Atlantic By Air. Encore Editions, 1977. ISBN 978-0684152349.
- Elliott, Bryn (January–February 1999). "On the Beat: The First 60 Years of Britain's Air Police". Air Enthusiast (79): 68–75. ISSN 0143-5450.
- Griehl, Manfred and Dressel, Joachim. Zeppelin! The German Airship Story. London, Arms and Armour Press, 1990. ISBN 1-85409-045-3.
- Higham, Robin. The British Rigid Airship 1908–1931. Henley-on-Thames: Foulis, 1961.
- Maitland, E.M. The Log of HMA R34 – Journey to America and Back. Centenary Edition, Pennoyer Centre, 2019. ISBN 978-1-9161642-0-8.
- Mowthorpe, Ces. Battlebags: British Airships of the First World War. 1995. ISBN 0-905778-13-8.
- Robinson, Douglas H. Giants in the Sky: A History of the Rigid Airship. Seattle, Washington, US: University of Washington Press, 1975. ISBN 0-295-95249-0.
- Rosie, George. Flight of the Titan: The Story of the R34. Birlinn Ltd, 2010. ISBN 978-1-84158-863-6.
- Tapper, Oliver. Armstrong Whitworth Aircraft since 1913. London: Putnam, 1988. ISBN 0-85177-826-7
- Venty, Arthur Frederick and Eugene M. Kolesnik. Airship Saga: The History of Airships Seen Through the Eyes of the Men Who Designed, Built, and Flew Them. Poole, Dorset, UK: Blandford Press, 1982. ISBN 978-0-7137-1001-4.
- Venty, Arthur Frederick and Eugene M. Kolesnik. Jane's Pocket Book of Airships. New York: Collier Books, 1976. ISBN 0-356-04656-7.
