= R36 (airship) =

British 1920s passenger airship

General information
- Type: Passenger airship
- National origin: United Kingdom
- Manufacturer: Beardmore
- Primary user: Air Ministry
- Number built: 1

History
- Manufactured: 1921 delivered
- First flight: 1 April 1921
- Retired: June 1926
- Developed from: Type U Zeppelin L49

R.36 was a British airship designed during World War I, but not completed until after the war. When she first flew in 1921, it was not in her originally intended role as a patrol aircraft for the Royal Navy, but as an airliner, the first airship to carry a civil registration (G-FAAF).

== Design ==
The design was produced by the new Airship Design Department, work commencing in November 1917. She was a lengthened version of the German Type U Zeppelin L49 (LZ 96) captured intact at Bourbonne-les-Bains in October 1917. The R.36, along with a second ship the R.37 were to be a stretched version of the L49, getting more lift by adding another 33 feet (10 m) gas bag. Two of her five engines were German Maybach engines, recovered from the downed LZ 113.

Construction began before the end of the war, but the design was altered to include accommodation for 50 passengers. This was more than twice the number carried by the two German airships LZ 120 Bodensee and LZ 121 Nordstern built for passenger carrying.

Unlike the L49 Type U, the control car was not suspended below the hull but directly attached to it, and formed the forward section of the elongated passenger compartment. The engines were housed in five engine cars, one pair (containing the Maybach engines) on either side of the hull forward of the control car, a second pair either side of the passenger compartment and the fifth on the centreline in front of the tail surfaces. Unlike previous British airship designs, the fins and horizontal stabilisers were cantilevered structures, with no external bracing.

== Operational history ==
R.36 was launched for her maiden flight on 1 April 1921 from the Beardmore works at Inchinnan near Glasgow. Late the following day she flew on to RNAS Pulham in Norfolk.

On 5 April it left Pulham at 07:25am bound for London. After making its appearance over the city it proceeded to Salisbury Plain, where it climbed to 6,000 ft (1800 m) and began manoeuvring trials. Starting a fast turn of 130 degrees it encountered windshear, which overstressed the rudder, collapsing the top rudder and starboard elevator. This made the ship adopt a nose down attitude and rapidly lose height, but it was brought under control at around 3,000 feet . Emergency repairs were made to the damaged control surfaces and the ship limped home on her one remaining rudder and elevator, using differential engine control to help with directional control, reaching Pulham at 9.15pm.

After repairs and strengthening work she re-emerged in June for a successful series of test flights, including an endurance trial starting on 10 June which lasted nearly 30 hours, covering 734 miles (1,174 km) over land and sea. She was also used by the Metropolitan Police for observing traffic congestion caused by the Ascot Races. Journalists and senior police representatives were entertained in great comfort on the day, and the journalists stories were dropped by parachute over Croydon airfield.

On 21 June, returning from another trial flight, she suffered damage during landing. The release of emergency ballast caused a sharp pitching up, straining the ship against the mooring line. The nearest unoccupied sheds were at Howden in Yorkshire since the Pulham sheds were holding German Zeppelins handed over as war reparations. The wind increased and it was decided that the LZ 109 (L 64) would have to be sacrificed to save the R.36. Within 4 hours L 64 had been cut into pieces and cleared to give enough room for R36. Even then she was damaged by a gust of wind during the manoeuvre into the shed.

Repairs were delayed while policy on airships was reviewed because of the R38 disaster and economic conditions. In 1925 she was refurbished for an experimental flight to Egypt as part of the Imperial Airship Scheme, but calculations cast doubt on her ability to make the trip as R.36 would require 13.65 tons of fuel for the trip, leaving only 2.35 tons for ballast, crew, passengers, cargo, and mail which was ridiculous. In the light of her age and condition she was scrapped in 1926. The total flying time achieved by R.36 was less than 100 hours when she was broken up in June 1936. The passenger accommodations of R.36 grotesquely exceeded the carrying capacity of the airship, something which was also true of the only other British passenger airships R.100 and R.101 which historian Robin Higham described as "a very real example of the predicament into which optimists landed themselves."

== Operators ==
United Kingdom

- Air Ministry
- Metropolitan Police

== Specifications ==
Data from The Airship Heritage Trust

General characteristics

- Crew: 28
- Capacity: 50 passengers
- Length: 675 ft 0 in (206 m)
- Diameter: 78 ft 6 in (23.9 m)
- Height: 91 ft 7 in (27.91 m)
- Volume: 2,101,000 cu ft (59,500 m^{3})
- Powerplant: 3 × Sunbeam Cossack , 350 hp (260 kW) each
- Powerplant: 2 × Maybach , 260 hp (190 kW) each

Performance

- Maximum speed: 65 mph (105 km/h, 56 kn)
- Range: 734 mi (1,181 km, 638 nmi) longest flight
- Endurance: 29 hours 54 minutes
- Service ceiling: 6,000 ft (1,829 m) highest attained
