= Maitland River (disambiguation) =

Maitland River is in Ontario, Canada.

Maitland River may also refer to:

- Maitland River (Western Australia), in the Pilbara region

== See also ==
- Maitland (disambiguation)
