= Maitland (surname) =

Origin
- Origin: Old French
- Region of origin: England, Scotland

Maitland is an English and Scottish surname. It arrived in Britain after the Norman Conquest of 1066. There are two theories about its source. It is either a nickname reference to "bad temper/disposition" (Old French, Maltalent; Anglo Norman French, mautalent/Mautalen; Latin malum talentum), or it may be a locational reference to Mautalant, a place in Pontorson, France. The Brittany connection is less likely than that with Les Moitiers-d'Allonne, near Carteret in the Cotentin. Mautalents continue to live in and near Les Moitiers-d'Allonne, and the early medieval charters link the Maltalents of England and Scotland with the Morville family – originating from Morville, near Valonges, and Roger de Mowbray, whose family came from Aubigny, also nearby. The name gradually mutated to Mautalent and then Maitland, with the latter spelling appearing around 1250 and becoming settled in the late 14th century.

The earliest public record of the surname in Britain, after the Battle Abbey Roll of 1066, dates to 1138 in Northumberland when Robert Maltalent witnessed a charter of Roger de Mowbray in Yorkshire.

The Clan Maitland is a lowland Scottish clan, the chief of which holds the title Earl of Lauderdale. The Earl's coat of arms features a lion rampant with all its joints cut off, forming a pun on the old version of the name (Mautalent sounding like the word 'mutilate').

== People with this surname ==
- Sir Adam Maitland (1885–1949), British Conservative Party politician
- Agnes Catherine Maitland (1850–1906), principal of Somerville College, Oxford
- Antony Maitland (1935–2025), British children's author and illustrator
- Brianna Maitland (born 1986), American teenager who disappeared in 2004
- Charles Maitland, 3rd Earl of Lauderdale (c. 1620–1691), Scottish judge
- Clover Maitland (b. 1972), Australian women's field hockey player
- Dalrymple Maitland (1848–1919), Liverpool-born businessman who became Speaker of the House of Keys
- Edward Maitland (writer) (1824–1897), English humanitarian writer
- Edward Maitland (RAF officer) (1880–1921), British military aviator
- Emma Maitland (1844–1923), British suffragist
- Frederic William Maitland (1850–1906), English jurist and historian
- Frederick Lewis Maitland (Royal Navy officer, born 1730) (1730–1786), captain in the Royal Navy
- Frederick Lewis Maitland (1777–1839), son of the above, Rear admiral in the Royal Navy
- Frederick Maitland (1763–1848), English General, Napoleonic era
- Henry Maitland Wilson (1881–1964), British Army general
- James Maitland, 8th Earl of Lauderdale (1759–1839), economist and representative peer for Scotland in the House of Lords
- Sir James Heriot-Maitland (1837–1902), British Army general
- James Maitland Stewart (1908–1997), American actor, widely known as James Stewart or Jimmy Stewart
- John Maitland, 1st Lord Maitland of Thirlestane (1537–1595), Lord Chancellor of Scotland
- John Maitland, 1st Duke of Lauderdale (1616–1682), Scottish politician, and leader within the Cabal Ministry
- John Maitland (British Army officer) (1732–1779), British military officer
- John Maitland (Royal Navy officer) (1771–1836), Royal Navy admiral
- John Maitland (Conservative politician) (1903–1977), British politician in the Conservative party (Tory)
- John Alexander Fuller Maitland (1856–1936), British music critic and scholar
- Kier Maitland (born 1988), Canadian freestyle swimmer
- Lady Olga Maitland (born 1944), British politician
- Lillias Maitland (1862–1932), one of the first women graduates from a Scottish University, University of Edinburgh 1893
- Mary Maitland (1550-1596), Scottish writer
- Mary Ann Maitland (1839-1919), Canadian writer
- Peregrine Maitland (1777–1854), British soldier and colonial administrator
- Richard Maitland (1496–1586), Scottish poet, Senator of the College of Justice, Ordinary Lord of Session
- Royal Maitland (1898–1946), Canadian politician in British Columbia
- Samuel Roffey Maitland (1792–1866), English priest and religious historian
- Sara Maitland (born 1950), British writer
- Sean Maitland (born 1988), New Zealand born Scottish rugby union player
- Thomas Maitland (British Army officer) (1759–1824), British colonial governor and general
- Thomas Maitland, Lord Dundrennan (1792–1851), Scottish judge
- Thomas Maitland, 11th Earl of Lauderdale (1803–1878), British naval officer
- William Maitland of Lethington (1525–1573), 'Secretary Lethington' to Mary, Queen of Scots
- William Maitland (c.1693–1757), historian and topographer, History of London from Its Foundation to the Present Time

== In popular culture ==
- Barbara and Adam Maitland, of the 1988 film Beetlejuice
- Victor Maitland, fictional villain of the 1984 film Beverly Hills Cop
