= Edward Maitland (RAF officer) =

Edward Maitland Maitland
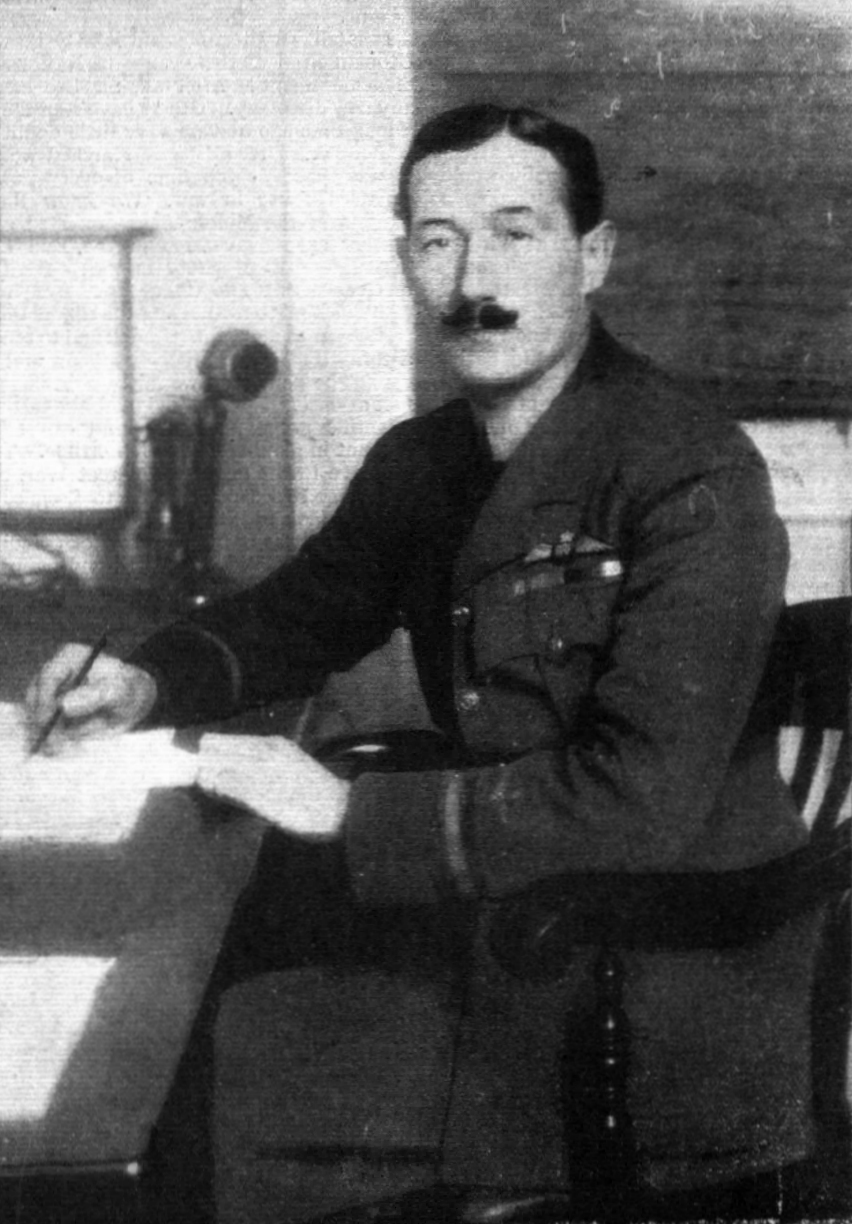
- Brigadier General Edward Maitland c.1918
- Born: 21 February 1880; London, England
- Died: 24 August 1921 (aged 41); Humber River, England
- Military career
- Allegiance: United Kingdom
- Branch: British Army (1900–1918); Royal Air Force (1918–1921)
- Service years: 1900–1921
- Rank: Air Commodore
- Commands: RAF Airship Base, Howden (1920–1921); RNAS Pulham (1916–1917); No. 1 Squadron RFC (1911–1914)
- Conflicts: Second Boer War; First World War
- Awards: Companion of the Order of St Michael and St George; Distinguished Service Order; Air Force Cross; Navy Distinguished Service Medal (United States)

Air Commodore Edward Maitland Maitland, CMG, DSO, AFC, FRGS (born Edward Maitland Gee; 21 February 1880 – 24 August 1921) was an early military aviator who served in the Air Battalion of the Royal Engineers, the Royal Flying Corps, the Royal Naval Air Service and the Royal Air Force. He was a noted pioneer of lighter-than-air aviation.

== Early life ==
Maitland was the eldest son of Arthur Gee, a barrister from Cambridgeshire. The family name was changed to 'Maitland' in 1903. He was educated at Haileybury and Trinity College, Cambridge, leaving Trinity without taking his degree to enlist in the Army. He later took his degree in 1906, gaining a third.

== Military career ==
Maitland was commissioned a second-lieutenant in the Essex Regiment on 23 May 1900, and served with the 2nd battalion of his regiment in the Orange River Colony during the Second Boer War in South Africa. He was promoted to lieutenant on 26 January 1902, and returned home with his battalion in October that year, after the end of the war three months earlier.

On 19 August 1911 Maitland was attached to the Royal Engineers' Air Battalion and later that year he was appointed Officer Commanding No. 1 Company, Air Battalion. (No. 1 Company, Air Battalion was subsequently renamed No. 1 Squadron RFC and then No. 1 Squadron RAF). In 1914, when the Army airships were transferred to the Navy, Maitland transferred to the Royal Naval Air Service and in the early months of World War I served with the Dunkirk Squadron, operating captive balloons. Impressed by the kite-balloons being used by the French, he returned to Britain to promote their use to the War Office, and was appointed head of the kite balloon school which was established at Roehampton. Early in 1916 he became the head of the Air Operational Department at the Admiralty, but this post did not suit him and he was appointed the head of the naval airship station at Pulham. On 1 April 1918, with the merger of the Royal Naval Air Service and the Royal Flying Corps, Maitland transferred to the Royal Air Force. He was subsequently promoted to air commodore.

== Accomplishments in ballooning ==
Maitland took up ballooning in 1908. On 18 November 1908, he flew with Mr C C Turner and Prof A E Gaudron in a balloon named the Mammoth from Crystal Palace in England to Meeki Derevi, near Novo Aleksandrovsk in Russia (now Zarasai in Lithuania). The distance of 1,117 miles (1,798 km) was covered in thirty-six and a half hours. From 1909 Maitland was attached to the Balloon School at Farnborough Airfield. In addition to ballooning, he also experimented with powered aircraft, but following a crash in which he broke both legs he restricted his activities to airships and balloons. He was awarded Royal Aero Club Airship Pilot certificate No.8 in September 1911 and in 1913 he carried out a parachute descent from the airship Delta. In 1919 Maitland was on board the Airship R34 when it completed the first transatlantic crossing.

On 24 August 1921 Maitland was killed when the R38 airship on which he was a passenger suffered structural failure and broke up in mid air over the Humber. He was buried at Western Cemetery in Hull.

== See also ==
- List of accidents and incidents involving military aircraft (pre-1925)

Military offices
Unknown	Officer Commanding No 1 Company Air Battalion; 1911–1912	Air Battalion reorganised as Royal Flying Corps
Royal Flying Corps established from Air Battalion	Officer Commanding No. 1 Squadron RFC; 1912–1914	Succeeded by Charles Longcroft
