= Rumsey Hall (Cornwall, Connecticut) =

- U.S. National Register of Historic Places
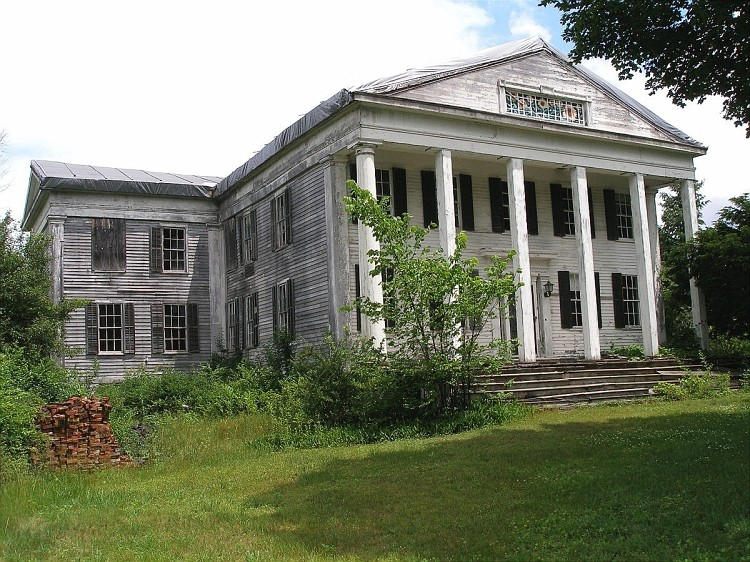
- Photo, 2006

- Location within Connecticut Location within the United States
- Location: 12 Bolton Hill Road, Cornwall, Connecticut
- Coordinates: 41°50′40″N 73°19′55″W
- Area: 2.2 acres (0.89 ha)
- Built: 1848
- Architect: Judson, Silas P.; Perry, Elizur G.
- Architectural style: Greek Revival
- NRHP reference No.: 90000762
- Added to NRHP: May 10, 1990

Rumsey Hall was an historic academic building at 12 Bolton Hill Road in Cornwall, Connecticut. Built in 1848, it was a distinguished example of Greek Revival architecture that served as home to a number of academic institutions, including the first campus of the Rumsey Hall School. It was listed on the National Register of Historic Places in 1990, and was demolished in 2010.

== Description and history ==
The Rumsey Hall building stood on the west side of the village of Cornwall, on the north side of Bolton Hill Road just west of the Congregational church. It was a 2-1/2 story wood frame structure, with a cruciform plan, covered by a gabled roof and finished in wooden clapboards. Its front facade consisted of a six-column Greek Revival temple front, the columns rising to an entablature that encircled the building, with a fully pedimented gable above. The gable had a rectangular multipane window at its center. The building corners were pilastered.

The building was erected in 1848 to house a boarding school called the Alger Institute, which was one of a number of such schools established in the region after the Housatonic Railroad began service in 1842. The school only survived until 1851, and was converted for use as a boarding house for summer visitors in 1884. It was converted back to academic use in 1886, but none of its occupants were long-lived. In 1907 the Rumsey Hall School moved into the premises from Seneca Falls, New York, and operated here until 1949. It was purchased by a neighboring landowner in 1855, and bequested to the town in 1986, which made plans to adapt the building for use as its town hall. The building was demolished in 2010.

== See also ==
- National Register of Historic Places listings in Litchfield County, Connecticut
