= Lillias Rumsey Sanford =

American school founder

Lillias Rumsey Sanford (1850-1940) was the founder of Rumsey Hall School, the second private nondenominational pre-preparatory school in the United States, originally located in Seneca Falls, New York.
