= HMAS Maitland =

Two units of the Royal Australian Navy (RAN) have been named HMAS Maitland, after the city of Maitland, New South Wales.

- HMAS Maitland (naval base), a naval base in Newcastle, New South Wales which was active from 1940 until 1946
- HMAS Maitland (ACPB 88), an Armidale-class patrol boat commissioned in 2006 and decommissioned in 2022
