= RAF East Fortune =

Former Royal Air Force flying base in East Lothian, Scotland

RAF East Fortune
- East Fortune, East Lothian in Scotland
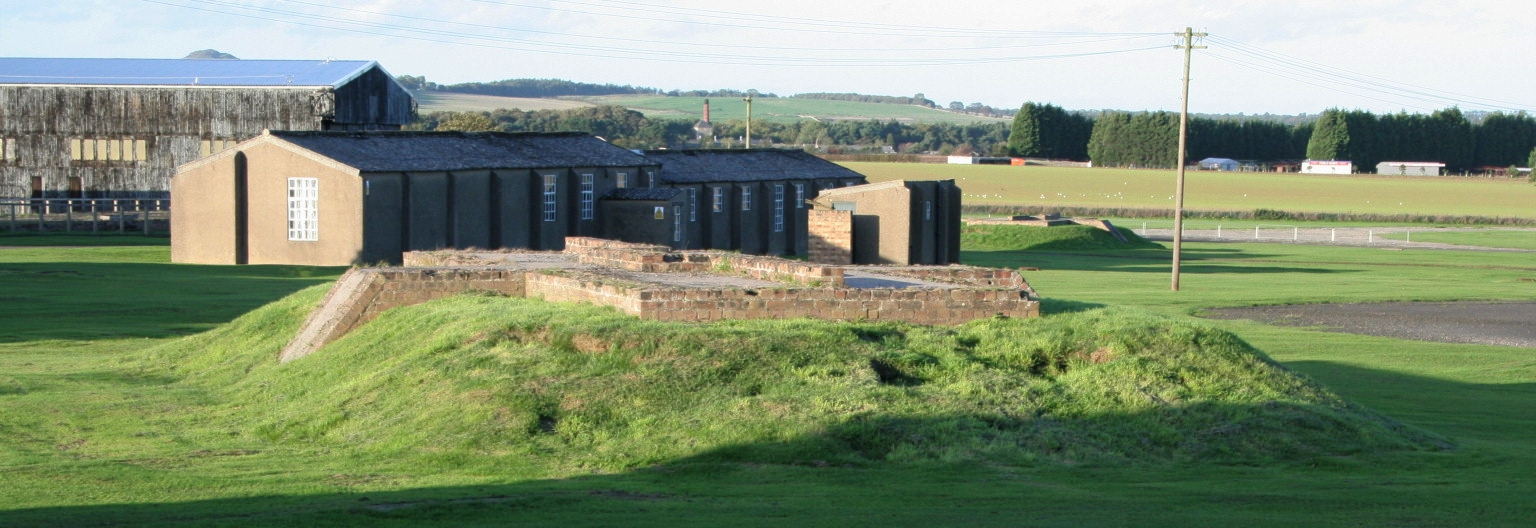
- RAF-era buildings still stand on the airfield, now the National Museum of Flight

Site information
- Type: Royal Air Force satellite station
- Code: EF
- Owner: Air Ministry
- Operator: Royal Naval Air Service; Royal Air Force
- Controlled by: RAF Fighter Command 1940–42 * No. 81 (OTU) Group RAF; RAF Coastal Command 1942– * No. 17 Group RAF

Location
- Shown within East Lothian RAF East Fortune (the United Kingdom)
- Coordinates: 55°59′56″N 002°43′01″W

Site history
- Built: 1915 & 1940
- In use: 1915–1920; 1940–1961
- Battles/wars: European theatre of World War II

Airfield information
- Elevation: 29 metres (95 ft) AMSL
Runways
| Direction | Length and surface |
|---|---|
| 00/00 | Tarmac |
| 00/00 | Tarmac |
| 00/00 | Tarmac |

Royal Air Force East Fortune, or more simply RAF East Fortune, is a former Royal Air Force station located just south of the village of East Fortune. It is a short distance east of Edinburgh, in Scotland. RAF East Fortune was used as a fighter station during the First World War and later used by a night fighter operational training unit during the Second World War. The motto of the station is "Fortune Favours the Bold".

Following the Second World War, the runways were taken over for local private aviation use. The former RAF buildings have been used for the National Museum of Flight since 1976. The airfield is a Scheduled Monument.

== History ==
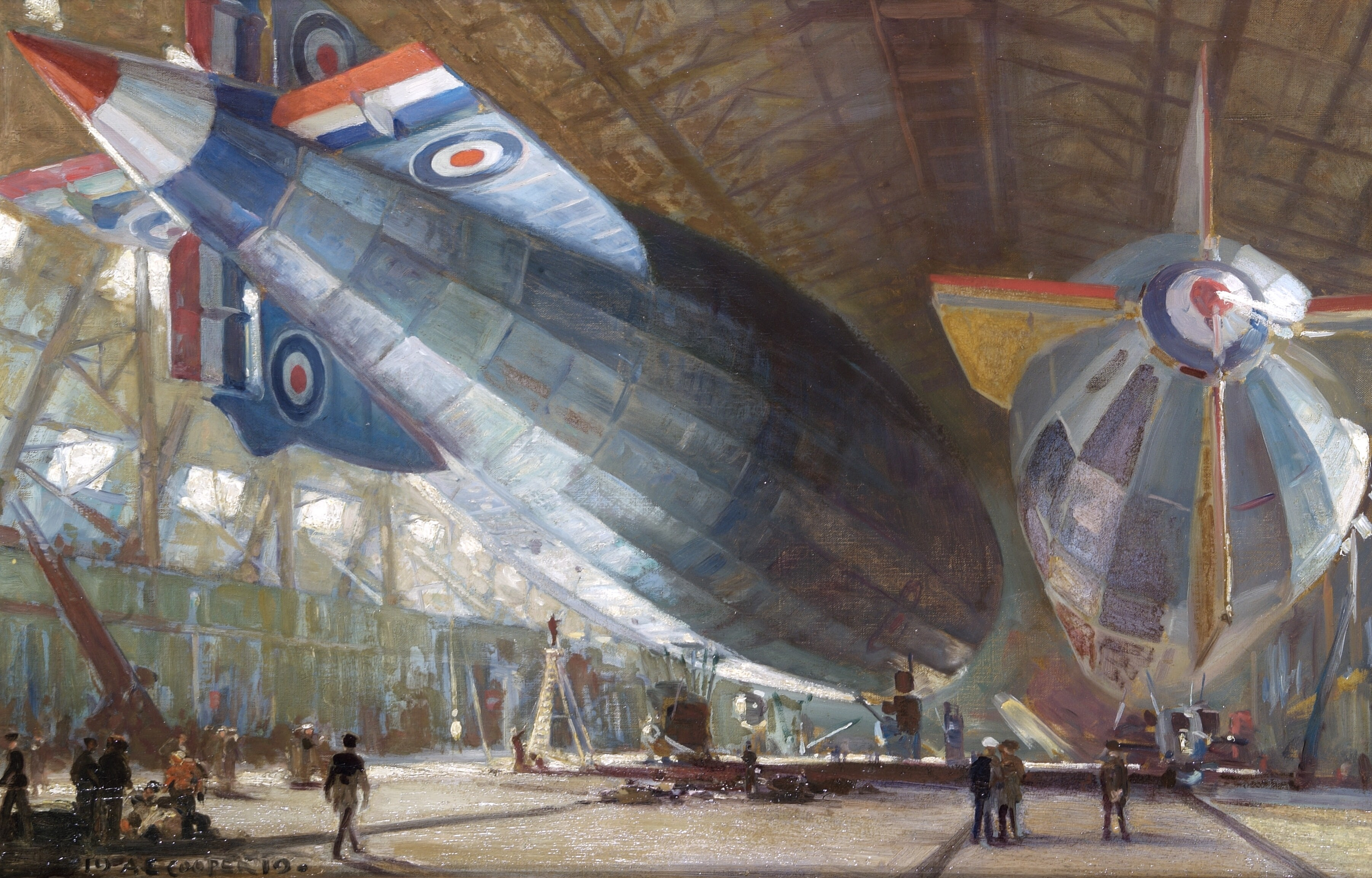
Airships 'R34' and 'R29' in a shed at East Fortune (IWMART4086)

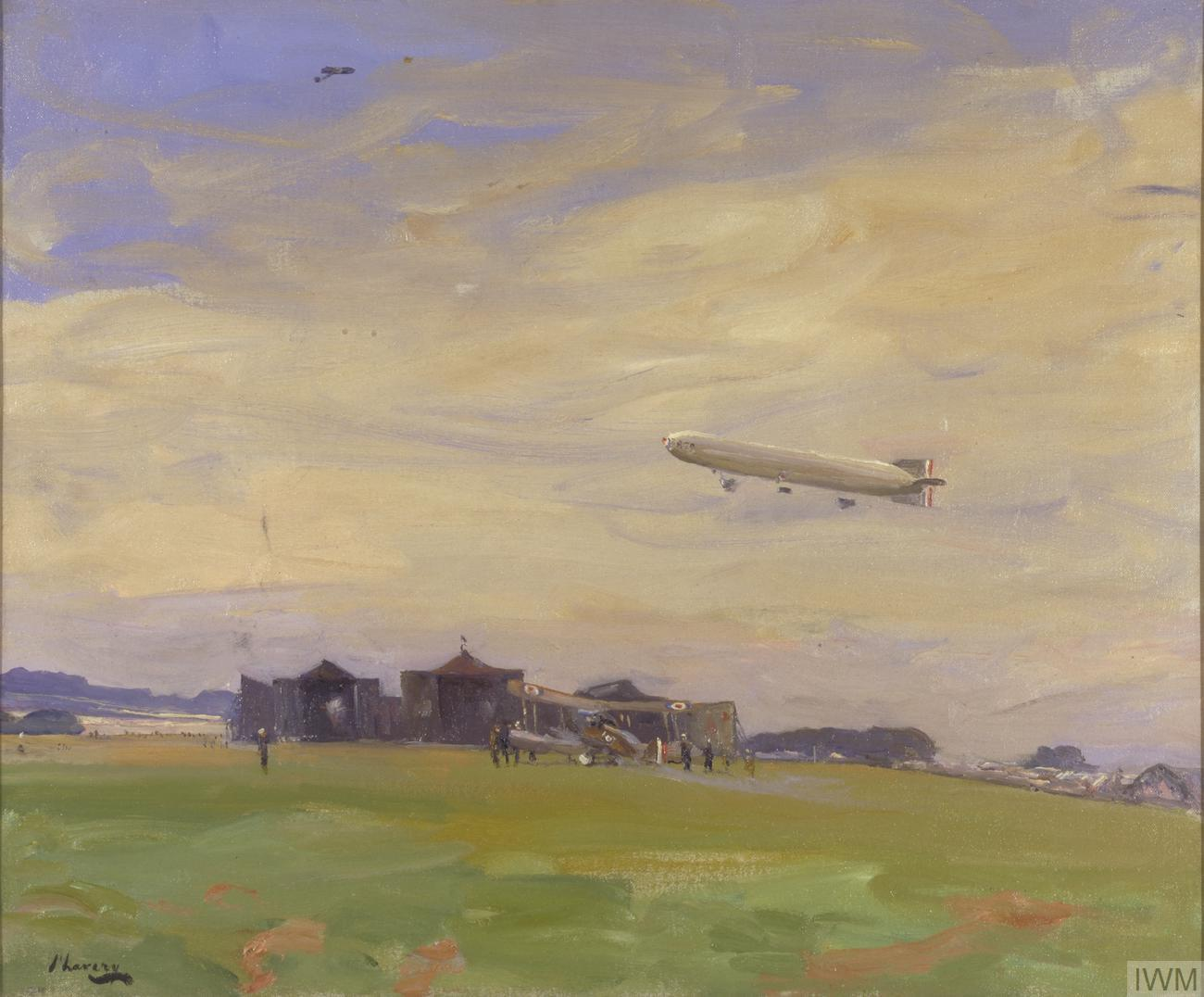
The Aerodrome, East Fortune, 1918 by John Lavery

The establishment of East Fortune as a flying station pre-dates the formation of the Royal Air Force. RAF East Fortune was first designated as a fighter and airship airfield in 1915 and became a Royal Naval Air Service station in August 1916. By early 1918, East Fortune was one of 66 Training Depot Stations (TDS). The purpose of the TDS was to train pilots for operational squadrons, and were often grouped together in threes. East Fortune was TDS station No. 208.

In July 1918, after the Royal Air Force was inaugurated, No. 22 (Training) Group RAF was activated at East Fortune and later moved to Stirling. No. 22 (Training) Group RAF is one of the few active Groups still operating within the RAF.

In 1918, a prototype Sopwith Snipe was trialled at East Fortune. After acceptance, this aircraft was introduced to the Torpedo Aeroplane School at the base, which was opened in August 1918.

The British airship R34 made the first-ever return flight across the Atlantic and the first east–west crossing by air, flying from East Fortune to Mineola, New York in 1919. The flight took 108 hours and 12 minutes.

In February 1920, the airfield and associated buildings were closed and listed for disposal. During the inter-war period, the hangars and airfield buildings were demolished, while the domestic site was sold to the South Eastern Counties of Scotland Joint Sanatorium Board for use as a tuberculosis sanatorium.

The airfield was reactivated during the Second World War, the land being requisitioned in June 1940 for use as a satellite airfield for nearby RAF Drem. However, it was subsequently decided to develop RAF East Fortune as a night fighter operational training unit (OTU), so on 4 June 1941, No. 60 OTU arrived from RAF Leconfield. This was an RAF Fighter Command unit that gave newly qualified pilots and other aircrew (wireless operator/air gunners or navigators) fresh from RAF Flying Training Command specific training and experience in night-fighting before assignment to operational squadrons as two-man (pilot and navigator/radar operator) crews. The OTU employed a mixture of trainer and operational aircraft types for this purpose; initially, crews were trained on the single-engined Boulton Paul Defiant night fighter, with Miles Master dual-control trainers being used for some pilot training exercises. As the Defiant became obsolete as a night fighter, the OTU switched to the twin-engined Bristol Blenheim and Bristol Beaufighter. By 1942 the Blenheim was also increasingly obsolescent as a night fighter, but as they had dual controls and were less challenging to fly than the newer Beaufighter they remained useful as trainers. Crews under training would therefore do most of their flying in Blenheims before converting to Beaufighters towards the end of the OTU course.

As the war progressed, the majority of the Luftwaffe's bombers were assigned to the Russian Front and Mediterranean Theatre. As a result, the threat of night attacks on Britain diminished and the need for additional night fighter crews was reduced, so starting in June 1942 part of No. 60 OTU was reassigned to RAF Coastal Command daylight strike training using Beaufighters. On 24 November 1942, 60 OTU was disbanded and some of its assets and personnel transferred to Coastal Command as the nucleus of the newly formed No. 132 OTU, a dedicated coastal strike training unit. Initially this unit continued to employ Blenheim and Beaufighter aircraft, but use of the ageing Blenheims subsequently declined and they were eventually replaced by Bristol Beauforts as the unit's dual-control trainers. In late 1944 the OTU began to receive some de Havilland Mosquito aircraft, and by the end of the war this was the main type used.

In addition to its primary training role RAF East Fortune was designated as an emergency diversion airfield for RAF Bomber Command, and it was available to heavy bombers returning from raids on Germany if adverse weather over England prevented them from landing at their home airfields.

In addition to No. 60 OTU and No. 132 OTU, the following units have operated here:

- No. 1 Torpedo Training Squadron RAF (July – August 1918) became No. 201 TDS (August 1918 – April 1919) became Torpedo Training School, East Fortune (April 1919 – 1920)
- No. 2 Gliding School RAF (October 1942)
- No. 185 Squadron RAF
- Detachment of No. 1489 (Fighter) Gunnery Flight RAF (September 1942 – ?)
- Coastal Command Ground Instructors School RAF (1944 – October 1945)
- Fleet Aerial Gunnery School RAF (July – November 1918)

== Post-war use ==
No. 132 OTU disbanded on 15 May 1946, and the domestic site was returned to the Sanatorium Board. Thereafter the airfield saw little or no use by the RAF, although it was allocated to the United States Air Force in 1950 as a dispersal base for strategic bombers during the Cold War. To accommodate such aircraft the main runway was extended to cross the B1347 road, but in the event, East Fortune was never used by the USAF and the site was eventually sold by the Air Ministry in 1960. East Fortune enjoyed a brief revival as an airfield during the summer of 1961, when Turnhouse Airport was closed for construction work. As a result, all civilian and military air traffic was diverted through East Fortune, with the airport accommodating the movement of nearly 100,000 passengers. The extended runway at East Fortune was used for this purpose throughout the summer of 1961.

After refurbishment, East Fortune Hospital reopened as a tuberculosis sanatorium in 1949. As the number of TB patients was declining, starting in the mid-1950s, spare capacity at the hospital was used for the long-term care of patients with learning disabilities and as a recuperation facility for general medical patients. Subsequently, the hospital primarily provided long-term geriatric care, which became the sole use in 1985 when the last mental health patients left. The hospital gradually declined during the 1990s and finally closed in 1997.

== Accidents and incidents ==
During both world wars, flying accidents during training were common and many airmen were killed or injured on non-operational flights. One of the earliest fatal accidents involving East Fortune occurred on 17 March 1916 when a Farman HF.20 from East Fortune plunged into the Firth of Forth with the loss of its crew.

Unsurprisingly, relatively inexperienced aircrew flying in high-performance, war-weary aircraft, suffered high accident rates. There were particular risks associated with the types of training undertaken at East Fortune during the Second World War, namely night fighter training involving extensive flying during the blackout and coastal-strike training involving extensive low-level flying, which carried the attendant risk of CFIT accidents with insufficient altitude to bail out in the event of mechanical failure. Neither the Beaufighter nor the Mosquito were particularly easy to make emergency escapes from, and the Beaufighter was a notoriously difficult aircraft to fly if one of the engines failed. Accordingly, there were many serious accidents involving aircraft operating from East Fortune. Accidents during the Second World War include:

- 1941, 15 August, Defiant Mk I N1692 of 60 OTU crashed into a farm building during an attempted forced-landing at West Mains Farm, 5 km southeast of Haddington, killing the pilot.
- 1941, 29 August, Defiant Mk I T4042 of 60 OTU crashed on Hunt Law in the Lammermuir Hills whilst on a training flight from East Fortune, killing the pilot.
- 1941, 30 August, Master T8627 of 60 OTU crashed near Scremerston, Northumberland, killing both crew.
- 1941, 5 September, Defiant Mk I R1679 of 60 OTU crashed near Edlington Hall, Northumberland, killing both crew.
- 1941, 26 September, Defiant Mk I V1138 of 60 OTU crashed on approach 2 miles northeast of RAF East Fortune, killing the observer.
- 1941, 16 November, Master Mk III W8528 of 60 OTU crashed at North Berwick, killing the pilot.
- 1941, 8 December, Defiant Mk I N1570 of 60 OTU crashed into the Firth of Forth. Both crew missing, presumed dead.
- 1941, 30 December, Defiant Mk I N1680 of 60 OTU crashed on the railway near Drem station, killing the pilot.
- 1942, 1 January, Defiant Mk I N3432 crashed at Troutbeck, Westmorland on a delivery flight to 60 OTU East Fortune, killing the ferry pilot (who was serving with 96 Squadron). The aircraft flew into high ground in bad weather.
- 1942, 4 January, Defiant Mk I N3495 of 60 OTU crashed 1/4 mile northeast of East Linton whilst on approach to RAF East Fortune, killing both aircrew. A severe rainstorm had developed suddenly and all pupils airborne had been ordered to land, but the inexperienced pilot was believed to have been overwhelmed by the conditions and flew into the ground.
- 1942, 15 January, Defiant Mk I N3422 of 60 OTU crashed at Berwick Law, North Berwick after a high speed stall during air combat practice. Both aircrew were killed.
- 1942, 15 January, Defiant Mk I V1182 of 60 OTU failed to return from an exercise, and was presumed to have ditched or crashed into the Firth of Forth. Both crew missing, presumed dead.
- 1942, 8 February, Defiant Mk I N1705 of 60 OTU crashed at Kingston Farm, North Berwick killing both aircrew. Immediately before the crash the pilot radioed that he had collided with something in cloud and was attempting to return to East Fortune. Subsequently, marks were found on high ground on Berwick Law suggesting that a glancing collision with terrain had occurred.
- 1942, 24 February, Miles Master Mk III W8623 of 60 OTU crashed at East Fortune killing the pilot.
- 1942, 18 March, Defiant Mk I N1629 of 60 OTU dived into the ground near Athelstaneford, killing the pilot.
- 1942, 23 March, the undercarriage of a 60 OTU Blenheim collapsed at RAF East Fortune, killing an airman working beneath it.
- 1942, 8 April, Blenheim Mk IV Z5871 of 60 OTU crashed 1/2 mile south of Long Yester, East Lothian killing both crew.
- 1942, 29 September, Blenheim Mk V BA142 of 60 OTU crashed at Howmuir Farm, East Linton, killing the pilot.
- 1942, 28 October, Blenheim Mk I L6752 of 60 OTU crashed near Ormiston in bad visibility, killing the pilot.
- 1942, 8 December, Blenheim Mk IV Z7443 of 132 OTU crashed near Lauder, killing the pilot.
- 1943, 3 January, Blenheim Mk V BA235 of 132 OTU crashed at Woodhall Farm, Innerwick, killing the pilot.
- 1943, 14 March, Blenheim Mk V BA107 of 132 OTU crashed in a night forced landing southwest of Athelstaneford, killing the pilot.
- 1943, 28 March, Blenheim Mk V BA201 of 132 OTU flew into high ground near Haddington at night, killing the pilot.
- 1943, 29 March, Blenheim Mk I L6691 of 132 OTU crashed near Athelstaneford after taking off from East Fortune at night, killing the pilot.
- 1943, 2 April, Blenheim Mk I L1119 of 132 OTU crashed 2 miles north west of the airfield after takeoff, killing the pilot.
- 1943, 12 May, Beaufighter Mk IIF R2340 of 132 OTU crashed at Crauchie Farm on approach to RAF East Fortune, killing the pilot.
- 1943, 28 May, Beaufighter Mk IIF R2283 of 132 OTU crashed after an engine cut out on overshoot at RAF Drem, killing the pilot.
- 1943, 14 June, Beaufighter Mk IIF R2278 of 132 OTU crashed near Gilmerton House just south of the airfield after colliding with treetops on overshoot, killing the pilot.
- 1943, 17 June, Blenheim Mk IV V5492 of 132 OTU crashed during a forced landing, killing the pilot.
- 1943, 19 September, Beaufighter Mk VIC JL852 of 132 OTU ditched in the North Sea off Northumberland following an engine failure. The pilot was rescued by a passing ship but the observer was never found.
- 1943, 2 December, Beaufighter Mk VIC EL433 of 132 OTU crashed at RAF East Fortune after the pilot attempted to abort a single-engined landing at the last minute. The aircraft crashed into the airfield's motor transport shed and exploded, killing both aircrew.
- 1943, 21 December, Beaufighter Mk VIC JL873 of 132 OTU crashed 3 mile north west of Crail whilst attempting a night forced landing. The pilot survived but the navigator was killed.
- 1944, 5 January, Beaufighter Mk VIC JL425 of 132 OTU crashed into the Firth of Forth 2m east of the Isle of May. Neither of the crew were found.
- 1944, 27 February, Beaufighter Mk VIC JL449 of 132 OTU crashed at RAF East Fortune during an attempted landing during a snowstorm. Both aircrew were killed.
- 1944, 19 March, Beaufighter Mk VIC JL652 of 132 OTU failed to return from a training flight and was presumed to have crashed or ditched in the sea. Both crew were missing, presumed killed.
- 1944, 5 May, Beaufighter Mk VIC JL581 of 132 OTU crashed near Gifford after an engine failed shortly after takeoff from East Fortune, Both crew were killed.
- 1944, 15 May, Beaufighter Mk VIC EL457 of 132 OTU crashed at Hedgehopehill, 7 miles south of Wooller, Northumberland, killing both crew.
- 1944, 29 May, Beaufighter Mk VIC EL240 of 132 OTU crashed near Haddington due to an engine failure shortly after takeoff from East Fortune, killing both crew.
- 1944, 15 June, Beaufighter Mk VIC JL855 of 132 OTU crashed into the sea off North Berwick during a gunnery exercise. Neither of the crew were found.
- 1944, 27 July, Beaufighter Mk VIC JL776 of 132 OTU crashed into sand dunes at Dirleton gunnery range during a practice attack, killing both crew.
- 1944, 8 August, Beaufighter Mk VIC JL824 of 132 OTU ditched in the North Sea 10 miles off Carnoustie following engine failure. The pilot was rescued but the observer was never found.
- 1944, 12 August, Beaufighter Mk VIC T5216 of 132 OTU crashed at Belhaven Sands following engine failure, killing the pilot.
- 1944, 12 August, Beaufighter Mk VIC X8096 of 132 OTU crashed into the Firth of Forth 3 miles west of the Bass Rock during a night exercise, killing both crew.
- 1944, 14 August, Beaufighter Mk VIC JL813 of 132 OTU crashed into the North Sea 9 miles off Peterhead. Both of the crew were missing, believed killed.
- 1944, 20 August, Beaufighter Mk VIC T5219 of 132 OTU crashed near RAF Milfield (Northumberland) following an engine failure. The pilot survived but the navigator was killed.
- 1944, 23 September, Beaufighter Mk VIC JL423 of 132 OTU failed to return from a night training flight and was presumed lost at sea with both crew.
- 1944, 8 October, Beaufighter Mk VIC EL338 of 132 OTU crashed at RAF East Fortune after hitting a wall during an attempted take off, killing the pilot and injuring the navigator.
- 1944, 22 October, Mosquito T. Mk III LR559 of 132 OTU crashed into Beech Hill House, a country house near Haddington, after a fuel tank exploded shortly after takeoff. The accident killed both aircrew and four people in the house, amongst them a niece and nephew of Field Marshal Haig.
- 1944, 27 October, Beaufighter Mk VIC JL427 of 132 OTU crashed into the North Sea near Barns Ness lighthouse, killing the pilot.
- 1944, 11 November, Beaufighter TF Mk X LX944 of 132 OTU crashed into the North Sea 5 miles northeast of St Abb's Head in bad weather. Neither of the airmen were ever found.
- 1945, 22 March, Beaufort T Mk IIA ML564 of 132 OTU crashed during an attempted overshoot at East Fortune, killing the pilot.
- 1945, 15 April, Beaufighter TF Mk X JM220 of 132 OTU crashed into the Firth of Forth near Fidra during exercises at Dirleton gunnery range. Both crew were killed.
- 1945, 3 May, Beaufighter TF Mk X NE813 of 132 OTU crashed onto high ground at Wester Dod, Stottencleugh Farm, Oldhamstocks, killing both crew.
- 1945, 21 June, Mosquito FB Mk VI NT201 of 132 OTU overshot on landing at East Fortune after a radiator fairing detached. The aircraft collided with a hut and both crew were killed.
- 1945, 20 August, Beaufighter TF Mk X RD714 of 132 OTU crashed at RAF East Fortune, killing the pilot. An airman was awarded the British Empire Medal for saving the navigator from the burning aircraft.

Many of the airmen who died flying from RAF East Fortune are buried at St Martin's New Burial Ground in Haddington.

During East Fortune's brief stint as Edinburgh's temporary airport during 1961, two notable accidents occurred. On a very wet Sunday in April 1961 a BEA Viscount airliner landing on a flight from Heathrow overshot the runway and ended up in the grass at the end of the runway after a 180-degree turn. Although the flight was fully laden there were no injuries. A few weeks later, on 26 May 1961, an RAF Percival Pembroke communications aircraft (serial number WV737) called at East Fortune to drop off two Air Vice-Marshals returning from a NATO meeting in Paris. Having done so, the crew took off for the short flight to RAF Leuchars, but almost immediately the aircraft suffered an engine fire and had to be crash-landed near North Berwick, East Lothian. Both members of the crew escaped from the crash alive, although the aircraft was destroyed by fire. An investigation determined that hydraulic lock had occurred in the port engine, due to the pilot omitting to undertake the required pre-takeoff procedures.

== Current use ==
In 1976 the Scottish National Museum of Flight was opened on the site of the former RAF station's technical site. Each summer the museum hosts an airshow. It is one of the few airfield-based airshows in the UK where fixed wing aeroplanes cannot land at the airfield.

The airfield is predominantly used for agriculture but the runways and taxiways are largely intact. A portion of the runways is used for a car boot sale each Sunday. The eastern end of the airfield is now used as a motorcycle racing circuit and is home to the Melville Motor Club. The concrete extension of the main runway west of the B1347 road is now used as a runway for microlight aircraft and as a scrapyard. This is the only part of the East Fortune airfield that can now handle aircraft, and no larger than a microlight.

The former domestic site, the East Fortune Hospital, remains largely vacant. In May 2016, it was revealed that there are plans for part of the site to be redeveloped as a village.

== See also ==
- List of former Royal Air Force stations
