= Lilias Maitland =

Scoottish university graduate (1862–1932)

- Born: 1862; St. Andrews
- Died: 1932 (aged 69–70)
- Education: University of Edinburgh
- Known for: Being one of the first women to graduate from a Scottish University

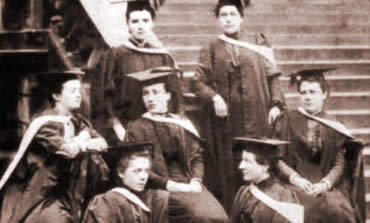
The first Scottish women graduates at The University of Edinburgh

Lilias Maitland (1862 – 1932) was one of the first women graduates from a Scottish University at the University of Edinburgh who graduated in 1893.

== Home life ==
Although Lilias Maitland was born in the parish of St Andrews and St Leonards, by the age of 17 lived at 21 Brighton Place, Portobello, where she matriculated from and remained during her studies and for the census in 1881, 1891 and 1901. She died in 1932 in the parish of her birth.

== Early beneficiary of equal education of women ==
Lilias Maitland was a member of the Edinburgh Association for the University Education of Women (EAUEW) which sought equality of education. Her final degree was M.A. in the Faculty of Arts with a First Class in Philosophical Honours.

According to the register to the Edinburgh Association for the University Education of Women, held in the University of Edinburgh Library archive, Maitland was registered for studying at the university over a five-year period as follows:

- Literature in 1887,
- Latin 1886,
- Greek 1888,
- Logic 1887,
- Moral Philosophy 1888,
- Mathematics 1889,
- Natural Philosophy 1889

Teaching and certifying women's higher education was an innovation supported by a few professors, who were said to wear academic dress whilst lecturing women. According to the records of EAUEW, Maitland completed the diploma 1889; Ordinary degree 1887; and Master of Arts First Class 1891 (although she did not graduate until the first women were permitted to do so in 1893).

Lilias Maitland was associated with Chrystal MacMillan and others in her classes who were active in the suffragette movement (although her own role regarding suffrage is not known ), listed on the University of Edinburgh #Vote100 timeline.

== See also ==
- Women's education
