= Rumsey Hall School =

Private boarding school in Washington, Connecticut, United States

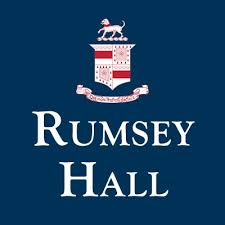

Location
- 201 Romford Road; Washington, Litchfield County, Connecticut 06794; United States

Information
- Type: Private, Boarding
- Motto: Qui Non Proficit Deficit "He who is not advancing falls behind."
- Established: 1900
- Head of School: Brooke Giese
- Grades: Pre-K-9
- Enrollment: 335 (as of 2025–26)
- Campus: 300 acres (1,200,000 m^{2})
- Athletics: 42 Athletic Offerings
- Team name: Blue Dogs
- Annual tuition: $82,500 (boarding) $21,050–$37,400 (day)
- Website: www.rumseyhall.org

Rumsey Hall School is an independent, coed junior boarding (6 - 9) and day (Pre K - 9) school in Washington, Connecticut. Rumsey Hall enrolls 358 students, and the campus consists of 32 buildings located on 300+ acres along the scenic Bantam River in the Litchfield Hills region.

== History ==
Founded in 1900 by Lillias Rumsey Sanford (1850–1940) as an all-boys school in Seneca Falls, New York, Rumsey Hall School moved to Rumsey Hall at Cornwall, Connecticut in 1906. In 1941, the school passed into the hands of John F. Schereschewsky Sr. Rumsey Hall moved to its current location in 1949, at which point it became coeducational. in 1943 John F. Schereschewsky Sr. left Rumsey Hall to join the Navy for two years. During this time, David Griffin Barr, a devoted faculty member since 1914, was appointed interim Director of Rumsey Hall. He led Rumsey Hall until Mr. Sherry returned. Mr. Barr remained as Headmaster until 1956 and John F. Schereschewsky Sr. acted as Director until his death in 1969. John F. Schereschewsky, Jr. served as Headmaster from 1965 to 1969 and as Director from 1969 to 1977. Louis Magnoli, a faculty member since 1957, became Headmaster in 1969 and served until 1985. Thomas Farmen, a faculty member since 1974, began as Headmaster in 1985 until 2016. Alumnus Matthew S. Hoeniger '81 was appointed eighth Headmaster in 2016. On July 1, 2021 Rumsey Hall School welcomed its tenth Head of School, Ian Craig, into office. In 2025, Brooke Giese was appointed Head of School, having previously served as Interim Head during the COVID-19 pandemic and as a longtime member of Rumsey Hall’s leadership team.

== Facilities ==
The physical plant includes 32 buildings on 147-acres along the Bantam River. The campus includes Upper and Lower School Academic Buildings, Fine Arts Building, Performing Arts Center, nine dormitories, seven athletic fields, two gymnasiums, hockey rink, as well as three indoor and three outdoor tennis courts and a newly constructed Dining Hall/Campus Center and Health Center.
