= Maitland River (Western Australia) =

River in Western Australia

Coordinates: 20°46′37″S 116°30′38″E

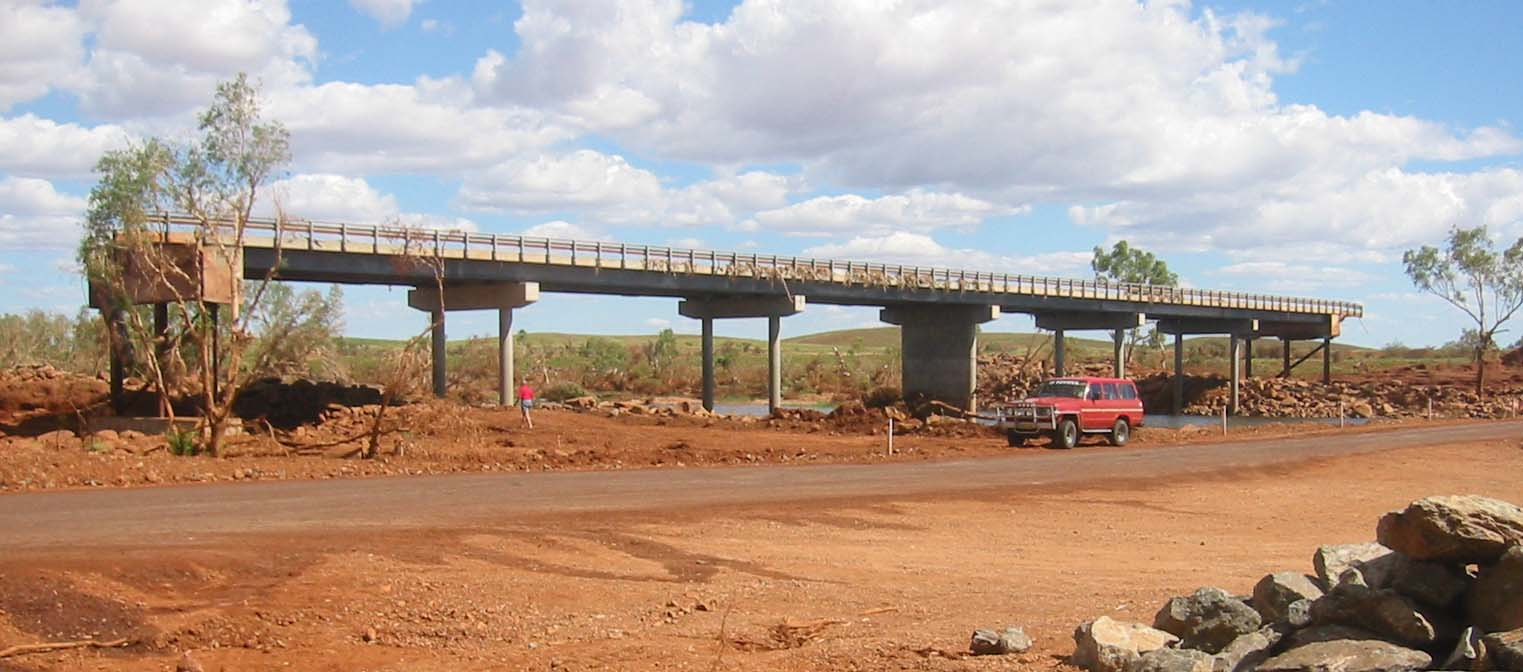

Location
- Country: Australia

Physical characteristics
- Source
  - elevation: 214 metres (702 ft)
- Mouth
  - location: Indian Ocean
  - elevation: sea level
- Length: 92 km (57 mi)
- Basin size: 2,123 km^{2} (820 sq mi)

The Maitland River is a river in the Pilbara region of Western Australia.

The headwaters of the river rise in the Chichester Range near Zebra Hill and it flows in a north-westerly direction. The river crosses the North West Coastal Highway south of Karratha then discharges into the Indian Ocean. The river flows through a number of permanent and semi-permanent pools on the way to the coast including Miaree Pool, Toorare Pool and Charrowie Pool.

The river has four tributaries: Four Mile Creek, Cockatoo Creek, Munni Munni Creek and Corringer Creek.

During an 1861 expedition, the surveyor and explorer Francis Thomas Gregory named the river after another member of the expedition party, volunteer Maitland Brown.

The traditional owners of the area that the river flows through are the Ngaluma people.

Flood damage caused by Cyclone Monty in 2004 washed away over 200 m of North West Coastal Highway approaches to the Maitland River Bridge and damaged 300 m of shoulders and embankment. Repairs cost an estimated $1.5 million.
