= R38-class airship =

British rigid airship class destroyed in 1921

R38 class (A class) airship
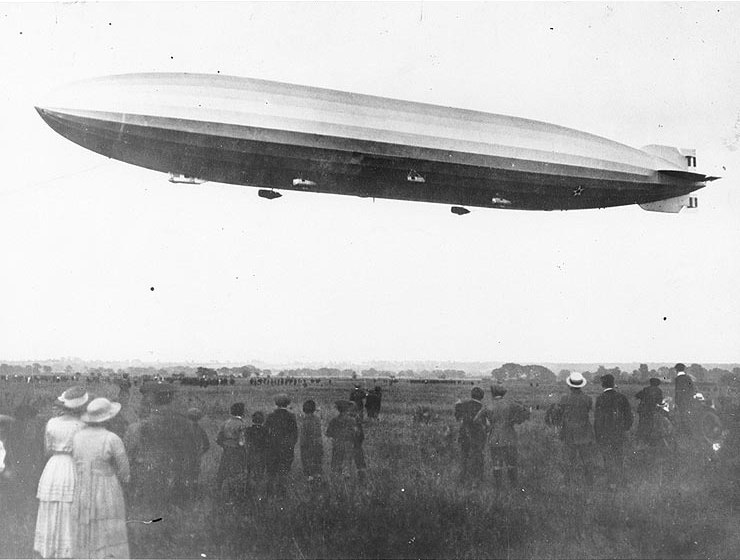
- The R.38/ZR-2 making its first flight trial on 23 June 1921

General information
- Type: Patrol airship
- National origin: United Kingdom
- Manufacturer: Short Brothers
- Status: Destroyed 24 August 1921
- Primary user: United States Navy
- Number built: 1 (orders for 3 others cancelled)

History
- Manufactured: 1
- First flight: 23 June 1921

The R.38 class (also known as the A class) of rigid airships was designed for Britain's Royal Navy during the final months of the First World War. Airships of this class were intended for long-range patrol duties over the North Sea. Four similar airships were originally ordered by the Admiralty, but orders for three of these (R.39, R.40 and R.41) were cancelled after the armistice with Germany and R.38, the lead ship of the class, was sold to the United States Navy in October 1919 before completion.

On 24 August 1921, R.38 (designated ZR-2 by the USN) suffered a structural failure whilst in flight over the city of Hull. It crashed into the Humber Estuary, killing 44 out of the 49 crew aboard and one black cat named Snowball. At the time of its first flight it was the world's largest airship. Its destruction was the first of the great airship disasters, followed by the Italian-built US semi-rigid airship Roma in 1922 (34 dead), the French Dixmude in 1923 (52 dead), the USS Shenandoah in 1925 (14 dead), the British R101 in 1930 (48 dead), the USS Akron in 1933 (73 dead), the USS Macon in 1935 (2 dead), and the German Hindenburg in 1937 (36 dead).

== Design and development ==
The R.38 class was designed to meet an Admiralty requirement of June 1918 for an airship capable of patrolling for six days at ranges of up to 300 miles from home base and altitudes of up to 22,000 ft (6,700 m). A heavy load of armaments was specified, to allow the airship to be used to escort surface vessels. Design work was carried out by an Admiralty team led by Constructor-Commander C. I. R. Campbell, of the Royal Corps of Navy Constructors. The construction contract was awarded to Short Brothers in September 1918 but cancelled on 31 January 1919 before work had been started. It was then re-ordered on 17 February: on the same day, Oswald Short was informed that the Cardington, Bedfordshire works, recently built as a specialised airship production facility, was to be nationalised. Construction of R.38 started at Cardington in February 1919. It was intended to follow R.38 with orders for three airships of the same class: R.39, identical to R.38, to be built by Armstrong-Whitworth, and two others, R.40 and R.41, of a design variant with the length reduced to 690 ft (210.31 m) due to the limited size of existing manufacturing sheds. The Armistice coupled with the assignment of airships from the admiralty to the Royal Air Force and a decision to nationalize the Shorts airship plant into the Royal Airship Works confused the matter of whom was responsible for what. Constructor-Commander Campbell became both Manager and Chief Designer of the Royal Airship Works.

Later in 1919, several airship orders were cancelled as a peacetime economy measure, including the three planned R.38 class ships. In a further round of cutbacks, the cancellation of the unfinished R.38 also appeared imminent, but, before this actually happened, the project was offered to the United States. The United States Navy demanded significant changes in the airship including modification to the bow in order to allow mooring to a mast, access to the mast from the keel and the addition of weight to the stern to ensure balance.

The hull contained 14 hydrogen-filled gasbags. The 13-sided mainframes were 49 ft (15 m) apart, and were made up of diamond-shaped trusses connected by 13 main and 12 secondary longitudinal girders and a trapezoidal keel. There were two secondary ring frames between each pair of mainframes. The forward-mounted control car was directly attached to the hull. The cruciform tail surfaces were unbraced cantilevers and carried aerodynamically balanced elevators and rudders. The six Sunbeam Cossack engines, each driving a two-bladed pusher propeller, were housed in individual cars arranged as three pairs: one pair aft of the control car, one pair amidships, and the third pair aft.

== Sale to United States ==
The United States Navy had decided that it wanted to add rigid airships to its fleet and originally hoped to get two Zeppelins as part of war reparations, but these had been deliberately destroyed by their crews in 1919 in actions connected with the scuttling of the German fleet at Scapa Flow. An order was placed with the Zeppelin company for a new craft, to be paid for by the Germans (which became USS Los Angeles), and, to go with it, they also planned to build one in the United States (which became USS Shenandoah). With the news of the impending termination of R.38's construction, the possibility of taking over the project was investigated. An agreement was reached in October 1919 for its purchase for £300,000, and work on the airship was resumed. As work progressed the US Navy began checking the documentation given them by the British. Following significant girder failures during testing Commander Jerome Hunsacker and Charles Burgess raised questions over the strength of R.38. Burgess concluded that "This investigation indicates that the transverses of the R.38 are only just strong enough, and have no factor of safety".

== Operational history ==
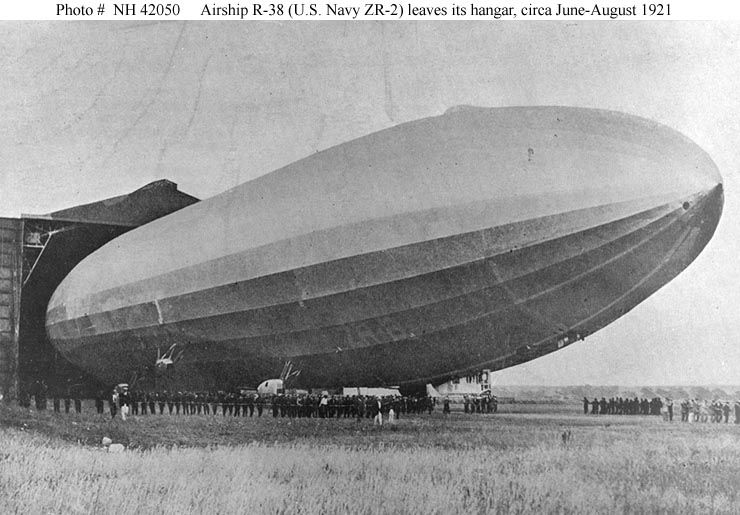
The R38/ZR-2 leaving its hangar for trials, showing the top gun platform.

The airship was to be given a curtailed series of tests before being handed over to the U.S. Navy, who were to fly it across the Atlantic. J. E. M. Pritchard, the officer in charge of flight testing, proposed to carry out 100 hours of flight testing, including flights in rough weather, followed by 50 more flown by an American crew before crossing the Atlantic. The commander of the Howden Detachment Commander Maxfield disagreed and urged that the test of R.38 be completed in one day. Air Commodore Edward Maitland as the man most responsible for testing the R.38 was appalled and disagreed. He protested the abbreviated test schedule. He was told to not provide advice unless asked. The Air Ministry ruled that 50 hours would be sufficient. The decision had been made in ignorance by officials unfamiliar with airships as well as the knowledgeable officers who were reluctant to release an airship of unproven strength, egged on by an eagerness to return to America by Commander Maxfield.

The R.38 made its first flight on 23–24 June 1921, when it flew registered as R.38 but bearing the US designation ZR-2; the seven-hour flight revealed problems with over-balance of the control surfaces. With the balance area of the top rudder reduced, a second test flight was carried out on 17–18 July. The control balance problem remained, and, on return to Cardington, all the control surfaces were reduced in area. On 17–18 July, a third flight was made, during which the airship was flown from Cardington to Howden and then out over the North Sea, where the speed was increased to 58 mph (93 km/h), causing the ship to begin hunting over a range of around 500 ft (150 m). The highly experienced Pritchard took over the controls from the American coxswain and reduced the oscillation, but several girders in the vicinity of the midship engine cars had already failed. The control surfaces were still over balanced. More importantly girders of intermediate frame 7b as well as longitudinal Girder F had failed in one place, while frame 7a and longitudinal F' each had failed in two locations. R.38 returned to Howden at reduced speed.

Work on reinforcing the buckled girders was carried out and completed by 30 July at Howden. There were increasing doubts being expressed about the design, including some made by Air Commodore E. M. Maitland, the very experienced commander of the Howden base. Maitland urged that all future speed trials be conducted at higher altitude as was the practice of the Germans while testing the fragile Zeppelins upon which the R.38 design was based. There was considerable concern expressed by Admiral Griffen, the chief of the Bureau of Steam Engineering. Burgess at the Bureau of Construction and Repair was also concerned. Starr Truscott of the Bureau of Construction and Repairs believed that the negative endorsements of Admirals Griffin and Taylor would suffice to extend trials for the ZR-2 (R.38) but he was soon proven wrong. Admiral Taylor endorsed Commander Maxfield's optimistic report of July 20. Truscott later came to accept that decision writing "We must accept ship as per British practice, i.e., if acceptable to Air Ministry it must be to us. Question of starting flight is up to people in England."

=== Fatal crash ===
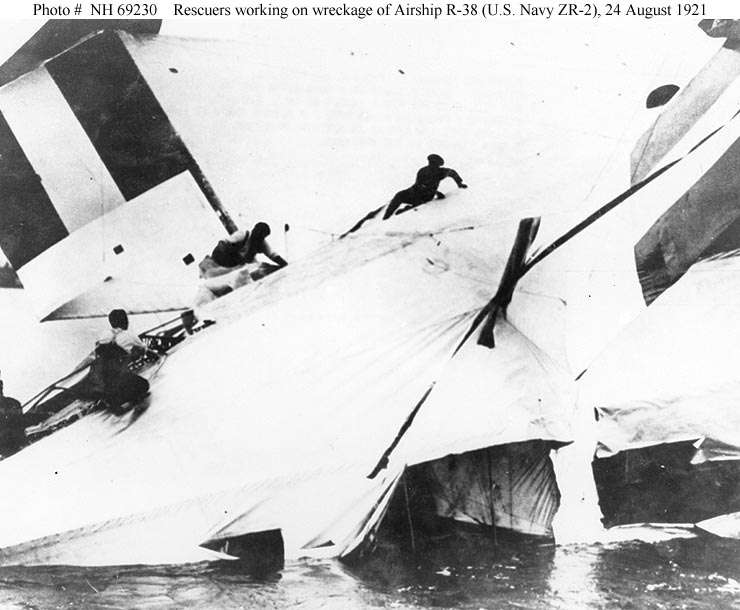
Rescuers scramble across the wreckage of British R.38/USN ZR-2, 24 August 1921.

Following a spell of bad weather, the airship was walked out on 23 August and, in the early morning, took off for its fourth flight, which had an intended destination of RNAS Pulham in Norfolk, where it could be moored to a mast (a facility unavailable at Howden). The mooring, however, proved impossible because of low cloud, so the airship returned to sea for the night. U.S. Navy Lieutenant Richard E. Byrd was unable to join the crew as he had mistakenly missed his train and the British thought he had skipped out. Byrd later rose to Rear Admiral and explored the North and South poles. The next day, after a brief speed trial (during which a speed of 71.9 mph (115.7 km/h) was reached), a series of turning trials was started at a speed of 62.7 mph (100.9 km/h) and an altitude of 2,500 ft (760 m). Passing over Hull, a series of control reversals were started which the Germans would never have attempted at such a low altitude. Wann, who was in the control gondola, stated that the controls were never put beyond 15 degrees, while Bateman, from the National Physical Laboratory who was recording pressures upon the vertical fins, stated clearly that the rudders were being driven rapidly from hard over to hard over which would have been 25 degrees from one side to 25 degrees to the other. At 17:37, while close offshore near Hull and watched by thousands of spectators, the structure failed amidships. Eyewitnesses reported seeing creases diagonally along the hull towards the stern. Both ends drooped. The R.38 then cracked open with men and objects dropping from the rupture. The two sections separated with the forward section catching fire followed by two colossal explosions. The two explosions broke windows over a large area with the flaming fore section falling rapidly followed by the aft section descending slowly. The remains fell into the shallow waters of the Humber Estuary. 16 of the 17 Americans, and 28 of the 32 Britons, in the crew were killed, including both Maitland and Pritchard. The only American to survive was Rigger Norman Otto Walker. Four of those who survived were in the tail section, Flight Lieutenant Archibald Herbert Wann, R.38's British Commanding Officer, was in the control gondola and survived.

A memorial was erected at Hull, and in 2021, a centenary memorial service was held at Hull Minster.

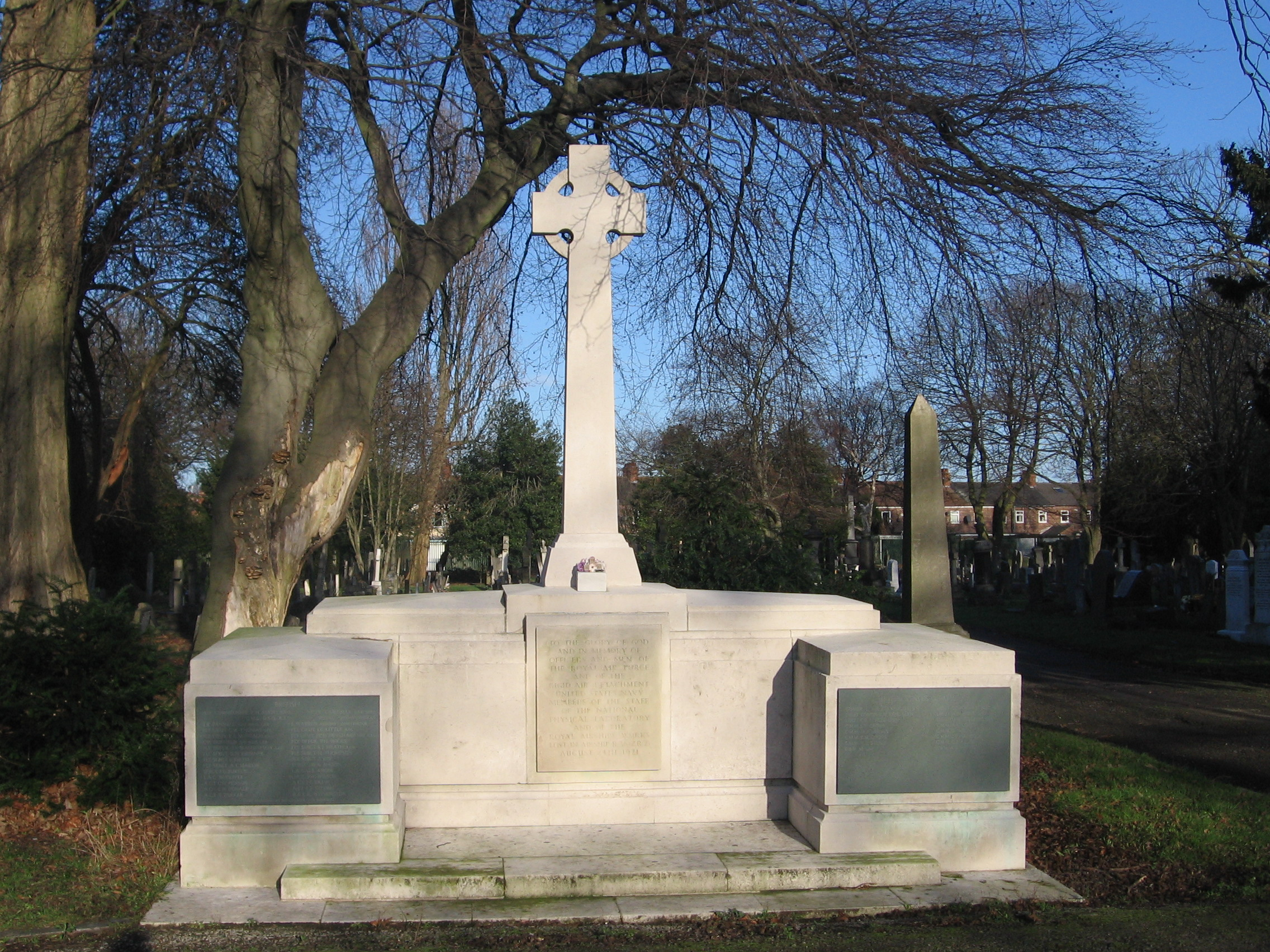
R38 memorial, Western Cemetery, Hull

The grave of John Pannell in Surbiton Cemetery, one of those killed in the accident

=== Aftermath ===
The loss of the R.38, which represented the hope of airship men in Britain, resulted in three official enquiries into the disaster. The first, chaired by Air Vice-Marshal Sir John Salmond and composed mainly of RAF personnel, was convened on 27 August. Its remit was to consider the general circumstances of the accident, and, although it came to the conclusion that the structure had failed while extreme control forces were being exerted, it was considered necessary to carry out a more detailed technical inquiry into the airship's design. The report also criticized the system by which a single authority was responsible both for the airship's construction and for inspection of the work, and, given the great differences between R.38 and previous British designs, held that the design should have been subjected to a more thorough scrutiny.

The Admiralty held a second inquiry into the history of the design of the airship, and into its construction up to the point where it was taken over from the Admiralty by the Air Ministry. In contrast to the previous inquiry, this one concluded that the design did not incorporate any new features which affected the airship's strength, and further maintained that "there was at the time no body in existence which could have been called in to advise on the structural strength of R.38."

The technical Committee of Enquiry, chaired by Mervyn O'Gorman, concluded that no allowance had been made for aerodynamic stresses in the design, and that while no loads had been placed on the structure during testing that would not have been met in normal use, the effects of the manoeuvres made had weakened the hull. No blame was attached to anyone, as this was not part of the committee's remit.

The R.38 disaster led to a rigorous investigation of the structure of airships preceding the design of the next two airships built in Britain, the R.100 and the more radical R.101. What is curious is that the practice of having responsibility for design and ultimately judging the airworthiness of that design remained in the same hands. Nevil Shute Norway (who was the novelist Nevil Shute) worked on the design of the R.100 airship for Vickers Ltd. from 1924. When he researched previous airship calculations and read the reports of the 1921 R.38 crash he was "unable to believe the words he was reading" that "the civil servants concerned had made no attempt to calculate the aerodynamic forces ... " and he asked one of his chiefs "if this could possibly be true. Not only did he confirm it but he pointed out that no one had been sacked over it or even suffered any censure." For the men who built the R.38 its sale to the US Navy represented a last chance to salvage something from the Royal Navy's rigid airship program and its takeover and abandonment by the RAF. The demands of the Exchequer and the US Navy's commander Maxwell converged to cause risks to be taken which were questioned at the time and ignored with fatal consequences.

== Specifications (R.38/ZR-2) ==
Data from Flight 6 June 1921 :ZR.2 ("R.38")

General characteristics

- Crew: 28–30
- Length: 695 ft (212 m)
- Diameter: 85 ft 4 in (26.01 m)
- Volume: 2,700,000 cu ft (76,000 m^{3})
- Fuel capacity: 30 long tons (67,200 lb; 30,481 kg)
- Useful lift: 185,900 lb (84,300 kg)
- Powerplant: 6 × Sunbeam Cossack III V-12 water-cooled piston engines, 350 hp (260 kW) each
- Propellers: 4-bladed fixed-pitch propellers

Performance

- Maximum speed: 70 mph (110 km/h, 61 kn)
- Cruise speed: 60 mph (97 km/h, 52 kn)
- Range: 6,500 mi (10,500 km, 5,600 nmi) at cruising speed

5,000 mi (4,300 nmi; 8,000 km) at maximum continuous power

- Service ceiling: 22,000 ft (6,700 m)

Armament

- Guns: * 1 × one-pounder gun top (intended)
- 14 × Lewis guns in (intended)
- Bombs: * 4 × 520 lb (236 kg) bombs (intended)
- 6 × 230 lb (105 kg) bombs (intended)

== R.38 Memorial Prize ==
In December 1922, the Council of the Royal Aeronautical Society decided to offer an annual prize for technical papers on airships, open to international competition. This would be known as the R.38 Memorial Prize. The first R.38 Memorial Prize was awarded to C.P. Burgess, Jerome Hunsacker, and Starr Truscott who presented their paper "The Strength of Rigid Airships."

== See also ==
- List of airship accidents
- List of airships of the United States Navy
- List of disasters in Great Britain and Ireland by death toll
