= RNAS Pulham =

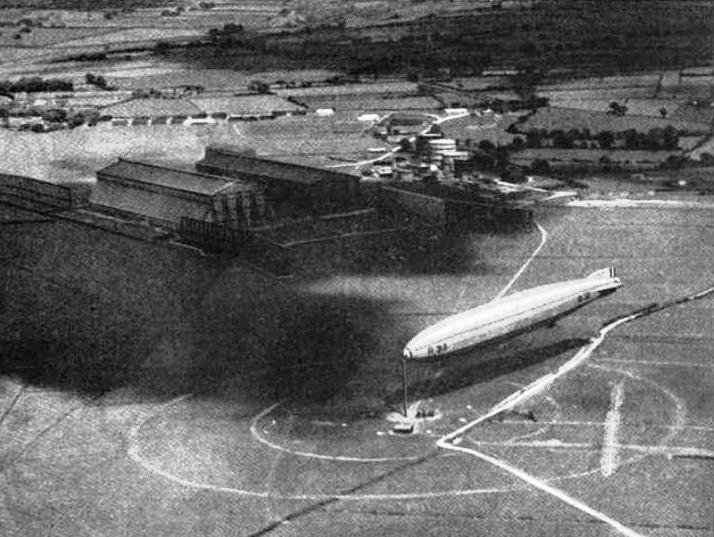
- Looking north-east at the R-33 at its mooring mast at RNAS Pulham circa 1921. Shed 2 is on the left and shed 1 is on the right. The hydrogen storage tanks can be seen behind.
- IATA: none; ICAO: none

Summary
- Airport type: Military: Airship station
- Operator: Royal Navy, RAF
- Location: Pulham St Mary
- In use: 1915–1948
- Elevation AMSL: 138 ft / 42 m
- Coordinates: 52°24′26″N 1°13′45″E

Map
- Location in Norfolk

RNAS Pulham (later RAF Pulham) was a Royal Naval Air Service (RNAS) airship station, near Pulham St Mary, 18 mi (29 km) south of Norwich, England. Though land was purchased by the Admiralty in 1912 the site was not operational until 1915. From 1918 to 1958, the unit was a Royal Air Force establishment. The land today is in private ownership, and little remains above ground.

== History ==
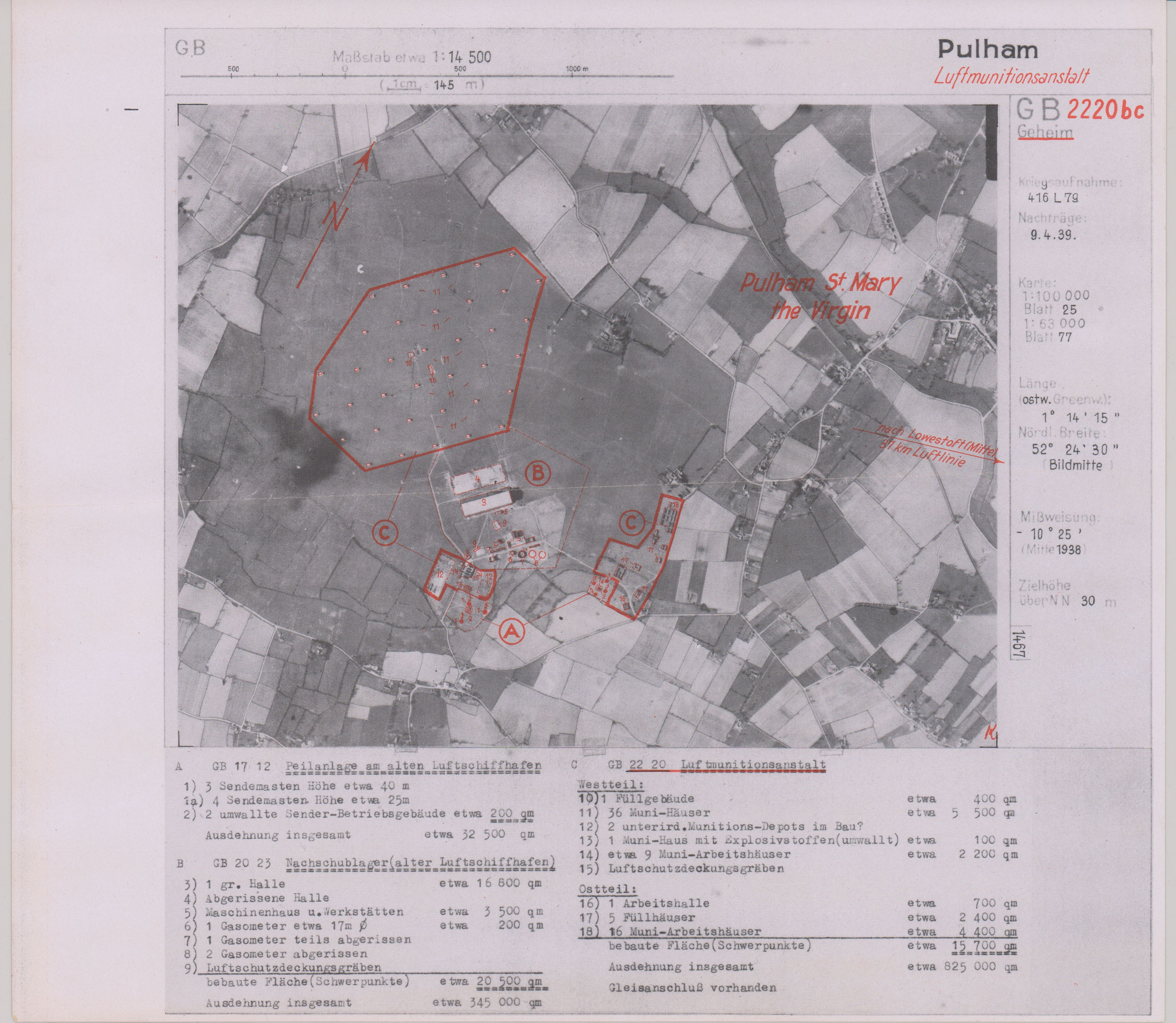
RNAS Pulham on a target dossier of the German Luftwaffe, 1939

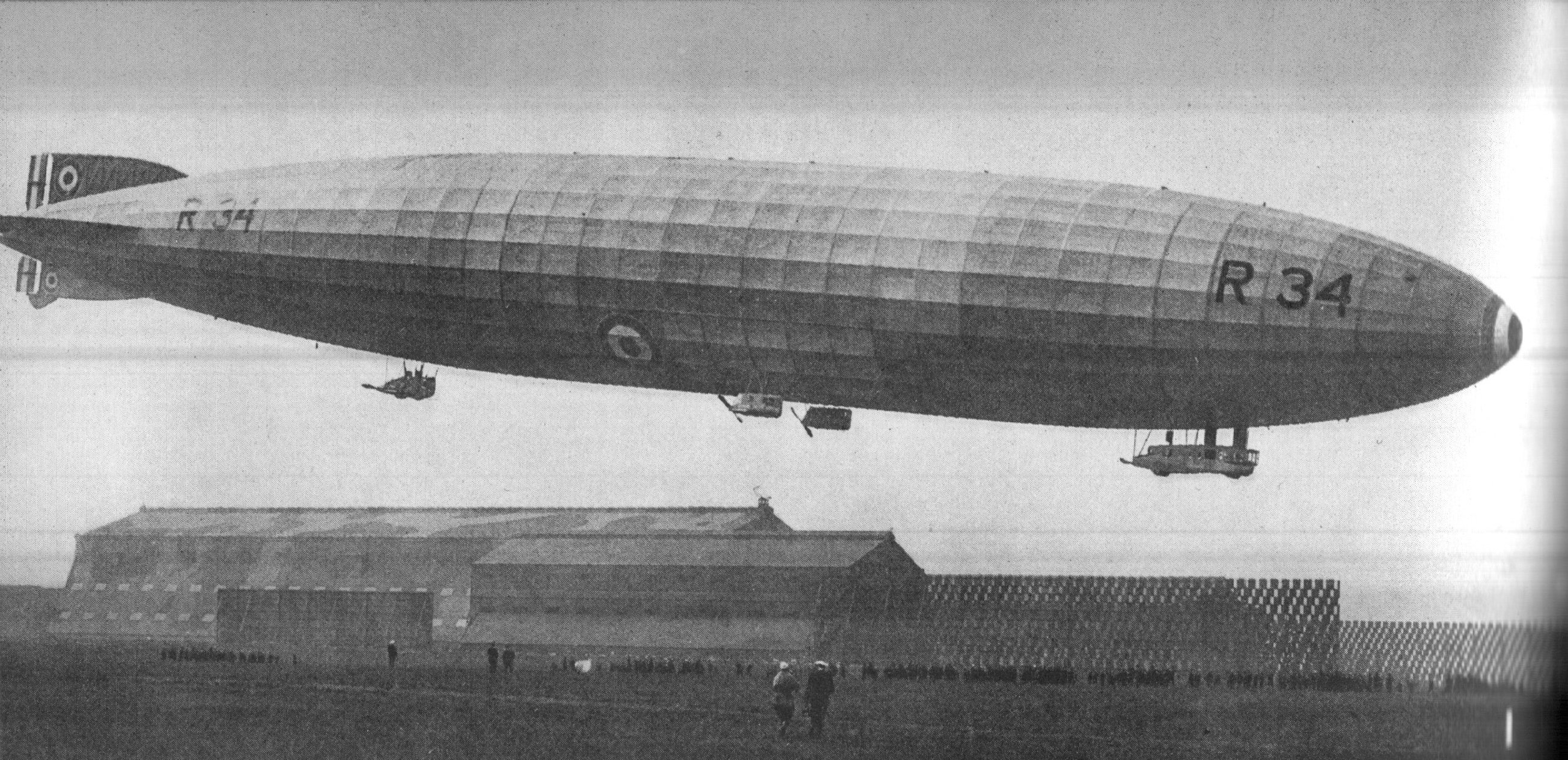
The R34 over RNAS Pulham

Pulham was one of the main British airship stations, with more than 3,000 men on the base at the end of the First World War. Initially it was used for airships that operated patrols over the North Sea (such as the Coastal and SS types) until their areas were taken over by seaplanes.

The R34 landed at RNAS Pulham to complete the first two-way flown crossing of the Atlantic in July 1919.

After the loss of the R101 in 1930 and the end of British airships, the station was moved on to a care and maintenance basis.

In its heyday Pulham had its own hydrogen plant, one small and two large airship sheds (one was later moved to RAF Cardington in 1930, the other was scrapped in 1948) and a permanent mooring mast.

During World War II, Pulham Air Station was used as an aircraft salvage yard. The RAF used the site for storage and Maintenance Unit work until closure in 1958.

== Archives ==
The Pennoyer Centre in Pulham St Mary holds an extensive archive of photographs and memorabilia relating to the Air Station.

== See also ==
- RNAS Howden
