= RNAS Howden =

Military base in Yorkshire, England

RNAS Howden

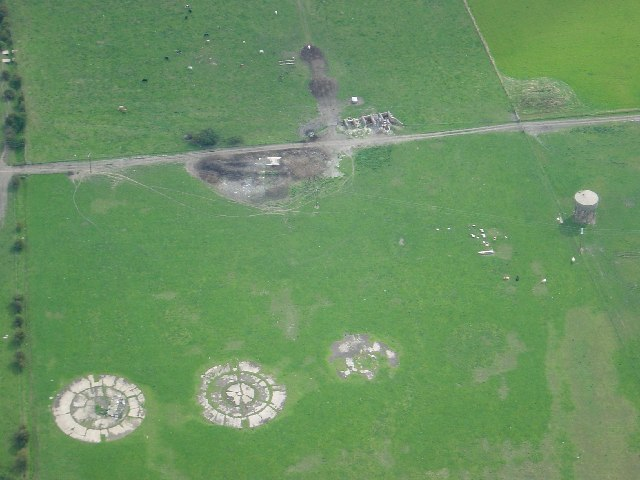
- Aerial view of the remains of the airship station (2005)
- IATA: none; ICAO: none

Summary
- Airport type: Military
- Operator: Royal Navy, Royal Air Force
- Location: Howden
- In use: 1916–1930
- Elevation AMSL: 23 ft / 7 m
- Coordinates: 53°47′17″N 00°51′57″W

Map
- Location in the East Riding of Yorkshire

RNAS Howden (later RAF Howden) was an airship station near the town of Howden 15 miles (24 km) south-east of York, England.

== History ==
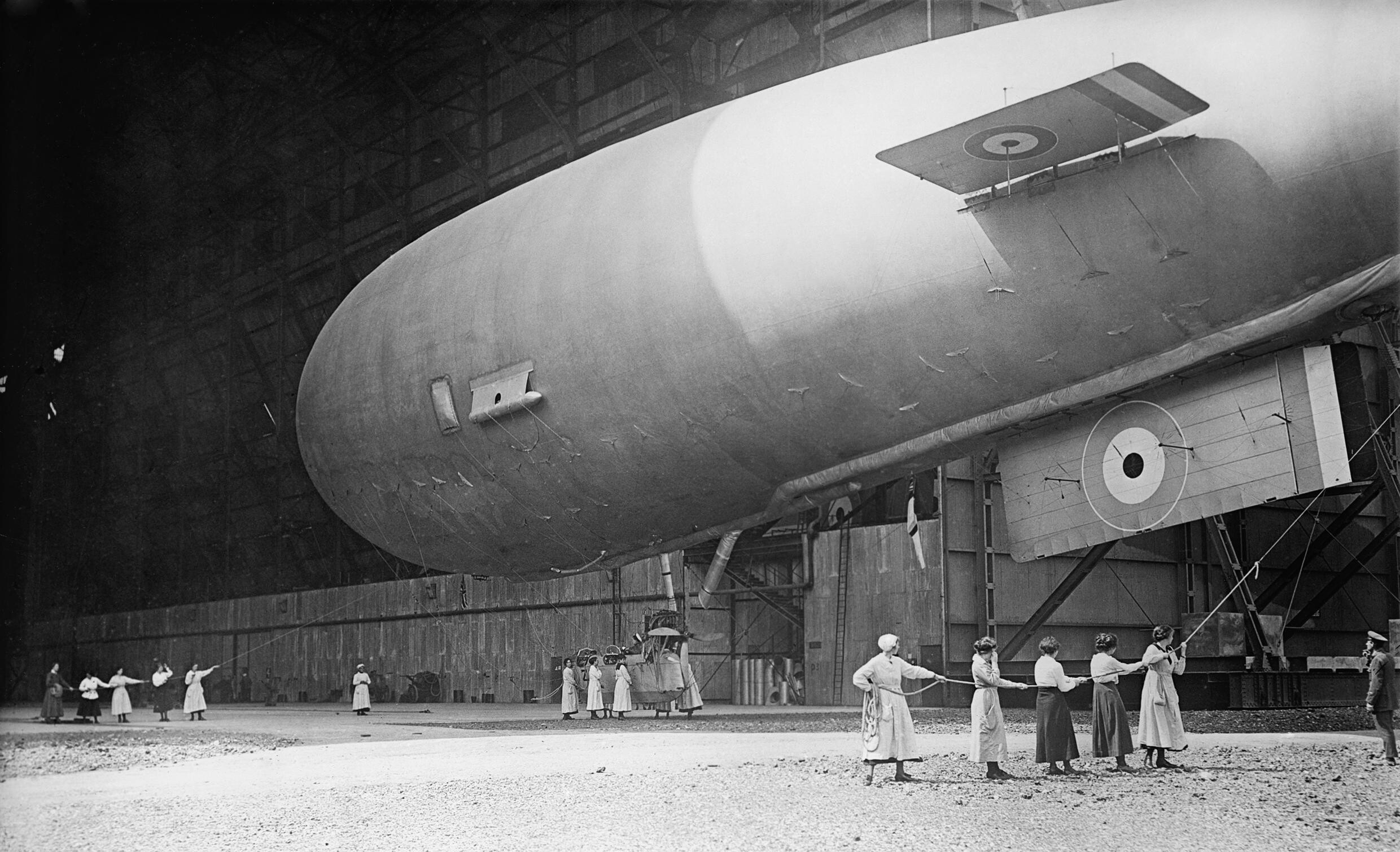
Non-rigid airship being handled at Howden during World War I

It was opened in March 1916 to cover the East Coast ports shipping from attacks by German U-boats during the First World War, with its first airship, the Coastal-class non-rigid airship arriving on 26 June 1916. From 1916 to 1918 Howden was a Royal Naval Air Service establishment, with the base transferring to the Royal Air Force when it was established on 1 April 1918. While airships flew on patrols from Howden until the end of the war, Howden-based airships never engaged in direct combat with German submarines.

The station remained operational after the end of the war, with operations continuing to support minesweeping operations over the North Sea. A new hangar, at the time the largest in the world, was completed in 1919. The No.2 Double Rigid Shed measured 750 ft (230 m) in length and 130 ft (40 m) clearance height.

In 1921, the rigid airship R38 was sold by Britain to the United States Navy. On completion, it was sent to Howden for trials and to train up its crew before the airship (to be renamed ZR2 by the Americans) crossed the Atlantic. On 23 August, R38 took off from Howden on its fourth flight, but broke up in flight over the Humber estuary at 5:37 pm on 24 August, killing 45 of the 49 on board. The station closed in September 1921, with the RAF having little interest in airship operations.

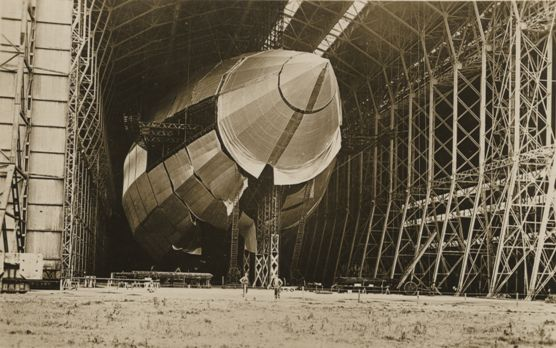
R100 in the hangar at Howden

The site was purchased in 1924 for £61,000 by the Airship Guarantee Co, a subsidiary of Vickers Ltd to design and build the R100 airship. During this period the author Nevil Shute worked at Howden alongside Barnes Wallis. R100 made its maiden flight from Howden on 16 December 1929, but the loss of the rival government designed airship, the R101 in October 1930 brought British plans for commercial use of airships to an end, and Vickers closed Howden in December 1930.

== See also ==
- RNAS Pulham
