= Farquhar–Hill rifle =

Rifle. .303 inch, Pattern 1918
- Type: Semi-automatic rifle
- Place of origin: United Kingdom

Service history
- Used by: Royal Flying Corps, British Army
- Wars: World War I

Production history
- Designer: Moubray G. Farquhar; Arthur H. Hill
- Designed: Tested 1908

Specifications
- Mass: 6.6 kg
- Length: 124.5 cm
- Cartridge: .303 British
- Action: Recoil (prototype); Gas
- Feed system: 5 round internal magazine (sporter version) 19 round drum magazine (military version)
- Sights: Ladder iron sights

The Farquhar–Hill rifle was a British design by Moubray G. Farquhar and Arthur H. Hill, and was one of the first semi-automatic rifles designed in the early 20th century.

== Description ==
The Farquhar-Hill was a long recoil operated semi-automatic rifle with rotary bolt locking. It was chambered for .303 British and fed from a 19-round drum magazine. Magazine variations included a 10-round truncated cone and a 65-round drum. It has a muzzle velocity of 732 m/s (2,400 ft/s) and is sighted to 1,500 yd (1,370 m). Some models of the rifle have a bayonet lug for an experimental shortened version of the bayonet pattern 1907 of the Lee-Enfield Mark III rifle.

The Farquhar-Hill was first patented in the UK in 1908 and in the United States in 1909. The key feature was an intermediate 'action' spring which stored recoil energy. Upon discharge, the barrel recoiled while still locked with the bolt, compressing the intermediate spring on recoil. Upon return of the barrel to the forward position, the energy stored in the intermediate spring cycled the bolt back and forth, extracting and ejecting the spent case and feeding a fresh round into the now stationary barrel. The main goal was to achieve smooth and reliable cycling, but the design was very complicated and thus badly suited for a military firearm. By 1911, Farquhar and Hill revised their rifle, changing its source of energy from barrel recoil to more convenient gas operated action. The new weapon also used an intermediate spring as a source of energy for cycling of the bolt with a stationary barrel, simplifying design and making it potentially more accurate and reliable. The design was refined and then tested by British Army on several occasions. This rifle was initially chambered for the new ".303 rimless" round, designed by necking up the 7.65x53mm Belgian Mauser case and loading it with British-issue Mk.VII bullet of .303 caliber. Later on this experimental loading was discarded in favor of the standard issue .303 British ammunition.

After several trials, including troop trials at the Front, and some use by observers in aircraft, in 1918 the Farquhar–Hill rifle was found to be suitable for military use and an official request was issued for procurement of as many as 100,000 Farquhar–Hill rifles. Official nomenclature assigned to the military Farquhar–Hill rifle in August 1918 was "Rifle. .303 inch, Pattern 1918". However, the war ended before production facilities were allocated, and manufacture of Farquhar–Hill rifles was cancelled in 1919.

== Further development ==
The Beardmore-Farquhar, a lightweight machine-gun operating on the same principle was developed during the same period and was first tested in 1916. The guns were manufactured by William Beardmore and Company. On several occasions the British Army tested this machine gun with the last being in 1931. They ultimately rejected it for a variety of reasons.

In 1926 3 were fitted to the Beardmore 26 fighter plane prototype.

== See also ==
- Fedorov Avtomat
- Cei-Rigotti
- Winchester Model 1907
- Mondragón rifle
- Remington Model 8
- RSC M1917
