= Indian locomotive class XC =

Indian XC
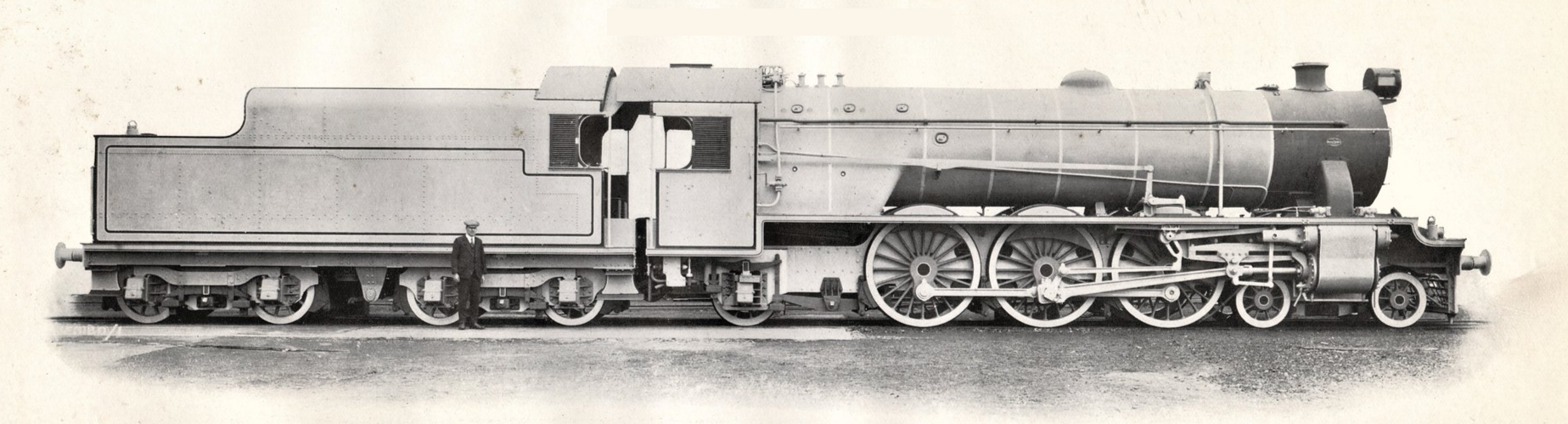
- Vulcan Foundry works photograph of an XC
Type and origin
- Power type: Steam
- Builder: William Beardmore & Co; Vulcan Foundry
- Build date: 1928–1931
- Total produced: 72
Specifications
- Configuration
  - Whyte: 4-6-2
  - UIC: 2′C1′h2
- Gauge: 5 ft 6 in (1,676 mm)
- Driver dia.: 6 ft 2 in (1.880 m)
- Axle load: 19.5 long tons (19.8 t; 21.8 short tons)
- Fuel type: Coal
- Cylinders: Two, outside
- Cylinder size: 23 in × 28 in (584 mm × 711 mm)
- Valve gear: Walschaerts
Career
- Operators: Indian Railways; North Western Railway of Pakistan
- Number in class: IR: 50; NWR (Pak): 22

The Indian locomotive class XC was a class of heavy axle load 4-6-2 "Pacific" type steam locomotives used on 5 ft 6 in (1,676 mm) broad-gauge lines in British India, and then in post-partition India and Pakistan.

The 72 members of the class were built in the United Kingdom between 1928 and 1931, some of them by William Beardmore & Co in Glasgow, Scotland, and the rest by Vulcan Foundry in Newton-le-Willows, Lancashire, England.

Upon partition of India in 1947, a total of 22 members of the class went to Pakistan. The other 50 remained in India.

The last example, XC 22224, survived in service as the last British-built express 4-6-2 locomotive in regular work until 1981, when it was stored Burdwan, India. It was last sighted in December 1981 and was scrapped sometime afterward.

== See also ==
- Rail transport in India § History
- History of rail transport in Pakistan
- Indian Railways
- Locomotives of India
- Pakistan Railways
