= ROF Dalmuir =

ROF Dalmuir was an Engineering Royal Ordnance Factory owned by the UK government during World War II. The factory manufactured medium-calibre guns, particularly anti-aircraft guns. After the war, the factory manufactured armoured fighting vehicles.

== Formation ==
Part of the site of the former William Beardmore and Company's Naval Construction Works at Dalmuir, Clydebank, Dunbartonshire, Scotland was bought by the Ministry of Supply, in January 1939, and it was converted into an Engineering ROF.

The Naval Construction Works had closed down in January 1931 (during the economic crash of 1929), with much of the equipment and plant sold off by auction. Some of the works' buildings were used by the new ROF, as they had already been converted by Beardmores for reuse as a locomotive works, tank manufacture and artillery manufacture. Other buildings were demolished and new buildings erected for the ROF.

== World War II production ==
ROF Dalmuir started production as a Royal Ordnance Factory under the control of the Ministry of Supply, it opened on 16 January 1941. In August 1941 it was handed over to William Beardmore and Company to run as an Agency Factory; and it returned to ROF Management control in September 1944.

It produced QF 3.75 inch AA and 4.5 inch (114 mm) anti-aircraft guns.

The main offices were hit in the Clydebank Blitz of 13 and 14 March 1941 and burned for three days; but the factory reopened in three weeks.

== Post-war production ==
In 1951 ROF Dalmuir was converted to manufacture armoured fighting vehicles and this continued until 1957 when the site was leased to Babcock & Wilcox of Renfrew on a 15-year lease.

== Closure and the site reuse ==
Babcock & Wilcox stopped using the ROF site in 1969 and the Ministry of Defence sold the site in 1970. Many of the buildings were demolished between 1971 and 1973 and Clydebank Industrial Estate was created. Part of the site is now occupied by the Golden Jubilee Hospital and the Beardmore Hotel.
