= Clydebank Blitz =

WWII aerial bombardment of city in Scotland

Coordinates: 55.8997°N 4.4006°W

- Part of the Strategic bombing campaign of World War II
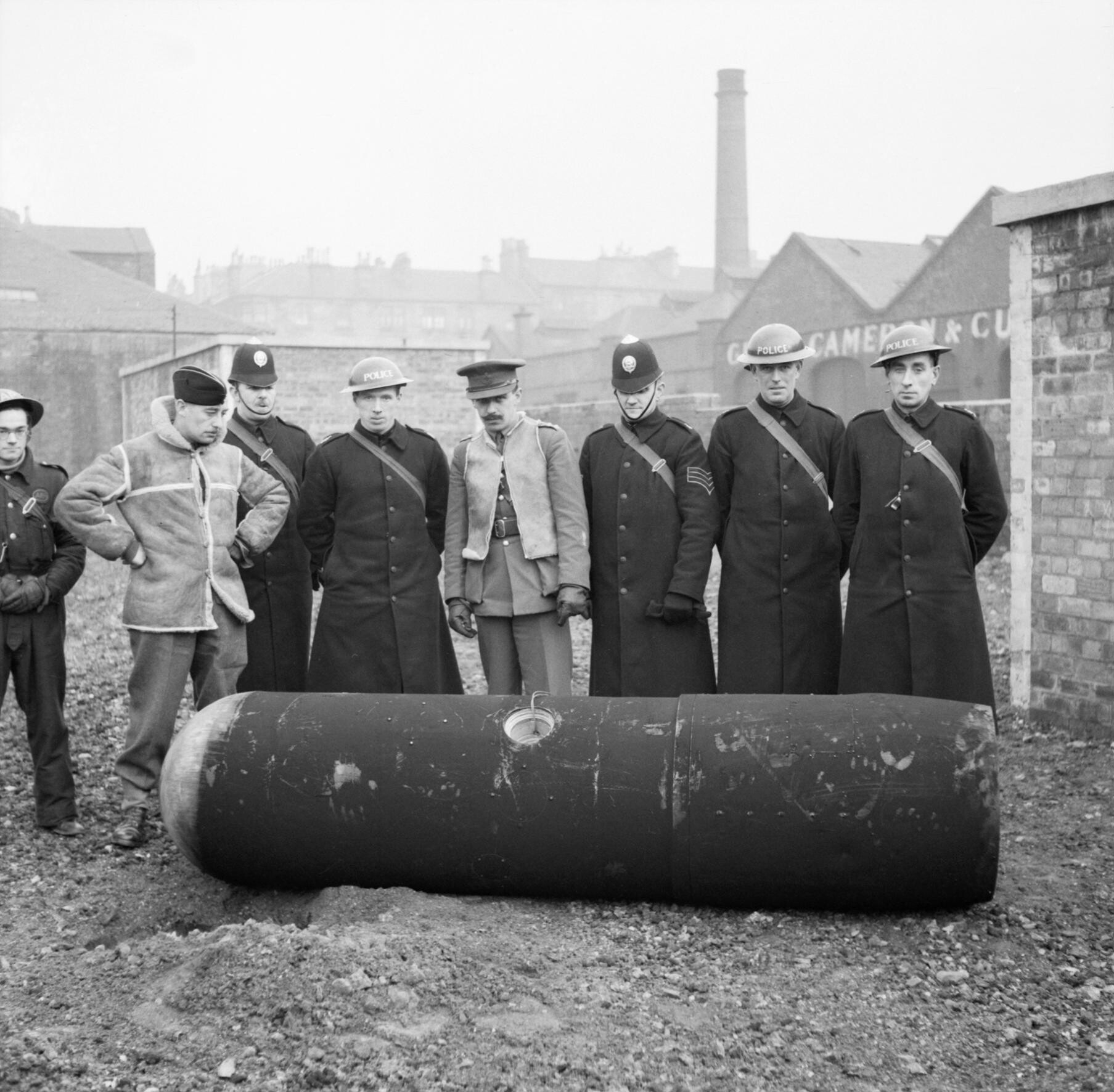
- A defused 1,000 kg Luftmine (German parachute mine) in Glasgow, 18 March 1941
Date	March 1941
Location	Clydebank, Scotland
Result	Clydebank largely destroyed by German air raids

Belligerents
Nazi Germany	United Kingdom; ∟ Scotland

Commanders and leaders
(Nazi Germany) Adolf Hitler; (Nazi Germany) Hermann Göring; (Nazi Germany) Hugo Sperrle; (Nazi Germany) Albert Kesselring; (Nazi Germany) Hans Jeschonnek	(United Kingdom) Winston Churchill; (United Kingdom) Hugh Dowding; (United Kingdom) Frederick Pile; (United Kingdom) Owen Tudor Boyd; (United Kingdom) Leslie Gossage

Casualties and losses
2 bombers shot down	1,200 killed, 1,000 wounded, 8,500 homes destroyed or damaged

The Clydebank Blitz was a pair of air raids conducted by the Luftwaffe on the shipbuilding and munition-making town of Clydebank in Scotland. The bombings took place in March 1941.

The air raids were part of a bombing program known today as The Blitz.

== The air raids ==
As a result of the raids on the nights of 13 and 14 March 1941, the town was largely destroyed and it suffered the worst destruction and civilian loss of life in all of Scotland. 1,200 people died, 1,000 people were seriously injured, and hundreds more were injured by blast debris. Over the course of the two nights, a total of 439 Luftwaffe bombers dropped in excess of 1,650 incendiary containers and 272 tonnes of bombs. Out of approximately 12,000 houses, only eight remained undamaged — with 4,000 completely destroyed and 4,500 severely damaged. Over 35,000 people were made homeless. In addition, some bombs destroyed Old Kilpatrick's catchment school, Gavinburn Primary School. It was rebuilt shortly after.

Clydebank's production of ships and munitions for the Allies made it a target (similar to the Barrow Blitz). Major targets included the John Brown & Company shipyard, ROF Dalmuir and the Singer Corporation factory. RAF fighters managed to shoot down two aircraft during the raid, but none were brought down by anti-aircraft fire.

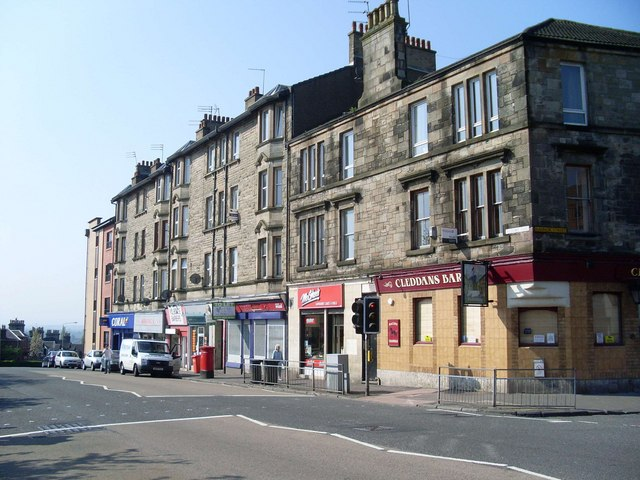
The building on the right was one of the few which survived the Blitz.

In his book Luftwaffe over Scotland: A History of German Air Attacks on Scotland, 1939-45, amateur historian Les Taylor characterised the Clydebank Blitz as "the most cataclysmic event" in wartime Scotland. He claims that while the raid on 13 March was not intended as a terror attack, it caused extensive damage because there was a lot of housing near the specific targets but the bombings the following night were indeed a terror attack as it "was intended to crack morale and force the people to call for an end to the war. However, it had quite the opposite effect, strengthening resolve for the war in Scotland."

== Effectiveness of the raids ==
To the immediate west of the town was situated Clydeside's main Admiralty Oil Storage facility, covering 130 acres (53 ha). Luftwaffe target maps categorised this area as the primary target. Post-raid surveys counted 96 bomb craters. 11 tanks were destroyed and 7 were severely damaged. The resulting inferno blazed for over four weeks. Clydebank, to the immediate east, suffered badly as a result of being in close proximity. Clydebank in 1941 was a small industrial town, approximately: 2 miles (3 km) long with an occupied townscape space of just over 1 1/2 square miles (4 km^{2}). Target discrimination was made difficult by the close mix of industry and housing resulting in a catastrophic housing loss.

Many industrial targets were severely damaged. Singer's wood yard was destroyed and Singer's main building was badly damaged. Rothesay Dock and John Browns Shipyards suffered severe incendiary damage. William Beardmore & Co lost furnaces and related industrial infrastructure. Schools, churches and built-up town areas became victims of incendiaries.

== War memorials ==
The main Blitz memorial is located in Dalnottar Cemetery above Clydebank. It is composed of a substantial granite memorial with bronze cast plates at its base designed by the artist Tom McKendrick. The castings name the 528 casualties. The memorial sits over the remains of Clydebank's unclaimed dead.

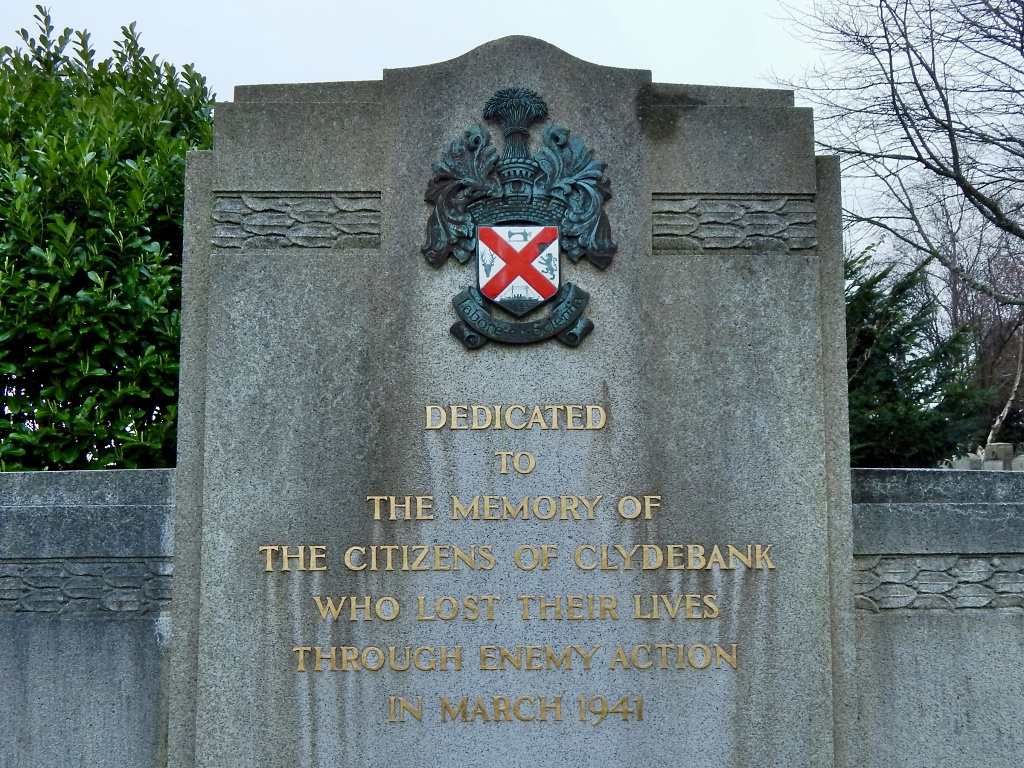
Clydebank Blitz Memorial (geograph.org.uk)

An additional memorial is dedicated to the crew of a Polish destroyer, ORP Piorun, which helped defend the town from the docks of the John Brown & Company shipyard. It is located directly opposite from the Town Hall, which has itself a shrine dedicated to those in Clydebank who died during World War I and World War II. There is another war memorial on Graham Avenue. A recording made in May 1941 by bombed-out civilian Tom Wright features on The Blitz, an archive audiobook CD issued in 2007.

There is a yearly memorial service held at Kilbowie Saint Andrew's Parish Church on the anniversary of the Clydebank Blitz and a memorial garden is located there. It is the only Church of Scotland building to survive the Blitz bombings. In 1997, as part of their 100-year anniversary celebration, a memorial side chapel dedicated to the victims of the Clydebank Blitz called "The Blitz Chapel" was added to the church. The church displays a triptych painting portraying images of the Blitz created by artist Tom McKendrick.

== Bibliography ==
- Macleod, John: "River of Fire: The Clydebank Blitz", Birlinn Ltd, 2010, 256 pages. ISBN 1-84341-049-4.
- Macphail, I.M.M.: "The Clydebank Blitz", West Dunbartonshire Libraries & Museums, 2007, 118 pages. ISBN 0-9537736-2-0
- McCloskey, Keith. From the Blitz to University Flying: Essays on Glasgow's Aviation History. Published on Amazon., 2019. ISBN 978 1706079569.
- Taylor, Les: "Luftwaffe over Scotland: a history of German air attacks on Scotland, 1939-45", Whittles Publishing, 2010, 160 pages. ISBN 1-84995-000-8
