= Golden Jubilee University National Hospital =

- National Waiting Times Centre Board

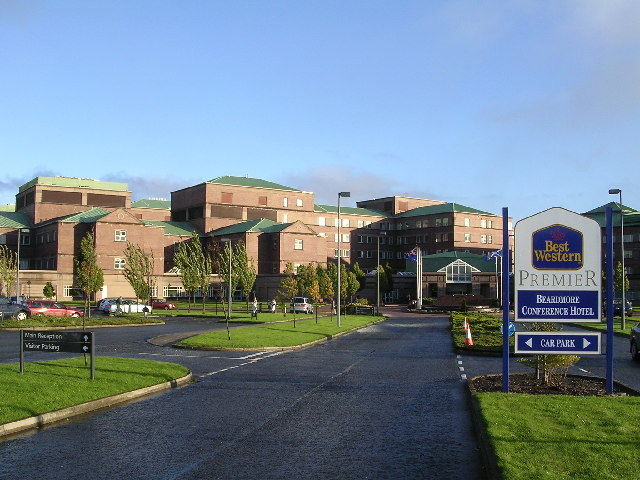
- Golden Jubilee University National Hospital and Conference Hotel

- Shown in West Dunbartonshire

Geography
- Location: Clydebank, West Dunbartonshire, Scotland, United Kingdom
- Coordinates: 55°54′25″N 4°25′33″W

Organisation
- Care system: NHS Scotland
- Type: Specialist
- Affiliated university: University of Glasgow Medical School; University of Strathclyde Medical School

Services
- Beds: 163
- Speciality: NHS Golden Jubilee; West of Scotland Heart and Lung Centre, Orthopaedics, Ophthalmology and Diagnostic Imaging.

History
- Founded: 1994

Links
- Website: hospital.nhsgoldenjubilee.co.uk

The Golden Jubilee University National Hospital is a hospital in Clydebank, near Glasgow, Scotland. It was opened in 1994 and is managed by a Special Health Board appointed by NHS Scotland.

== History ==
=== Site ===
The site was once part of the William Beardmore and Company Naval Construction Works. Built between 1901 and 1906, the yard covered nearly 100 acres (40 hectares), making it was one of the largest shipyards in the UK. It produced a large range of products, including ships of all descriptions, aircraft, airships, tanks, guns, shells and mines. After the First World War, it constructed locomotives and steel houses. The yard became uneconomic in the 1920s and closed its gates for the last time in 1930. Later used as ROF Dalmuir, many of the buildings survived into the 1980s, with some shipbreaking on the site.

=== Hospital ===
The building was designed by The Architects Collaborative Boston (TAC) USA with Keppie Henderson Architects Glasgow and planning permission was granted in October 1988. The hospital was built as a private hospital by the American company Health Care International at a cost of was £180 million and opened in March 1994.

Six months after opening, receivers were involved and several months after that, it was being run by the Middle Eastern-based Abu Dhabi Investment Company. The controversial venture proved unsuccessful in private hands and the hospital was purchased in 2002 by the Scottish Executive for the National Health Service, at a cost of £37.5 million. Initially known as the National Waiting Times Centre, it was soon renamed the Golden Jubilee National Hospital.

A new two-theatre Orthopaedic suite was added in 2003, amongst the most advanced in Europe. The hospital used to house the headquarters and western call-centre for NHS 24, the telephone helpline until the lease was terminated and NHS 24 moved to Aurora House in Clydebank.

On 13 April 2022, after the hospital was awarded university status by the University of Strathclyde, the hospital was renamed the Golden Jubilee University National Hospital.

== Services ==
The Golden Jubilee University National Hospital occupies the north bank of the River Clyde at Dalmuir, but receives referrals from across the country. The Clydebank hospital is Scotland's flagship hospital for reducing patient waiting times. The NHS National Waiting Times Centre is an NHS Special Board made up of two distinct parts – the Golden Jubilee University National Hospital and the Golden Jubilee Conference Hotel.

The hospital is home to the West of Scotland Heart and Lung Centre, which opened in 2007. It carries out the most thoracic surgeries in the United Kingdom and Ireland. It provides regional and national services; including the West of Scotland Optimal Reperfusion Service, providing primary angioplasty. The centre has five cath labs including a dedicated electrophysiology lab.

The hospital is one of the leading hospitals for orthopaedics in UK. The Orthopaedics department pioneered a CALEDONIAN technique for postoperative pain relief, quick mobilisation and early discharge of patients. It is a centre where computer assisted joint replacements are performed and has done extensive research in this field.

=== Hotel ===
The on-site Golden Jubilee Conference Hotel is a 168-room four-star hotel and conference centre. Formerly known as the Beardmore Hotel, it was built to accommodate the relatives of the wealthy private patients. Now also owned by the National Health Service, it hosts medical conferences.
