= Mondragón rifle =

Mondragón rifles
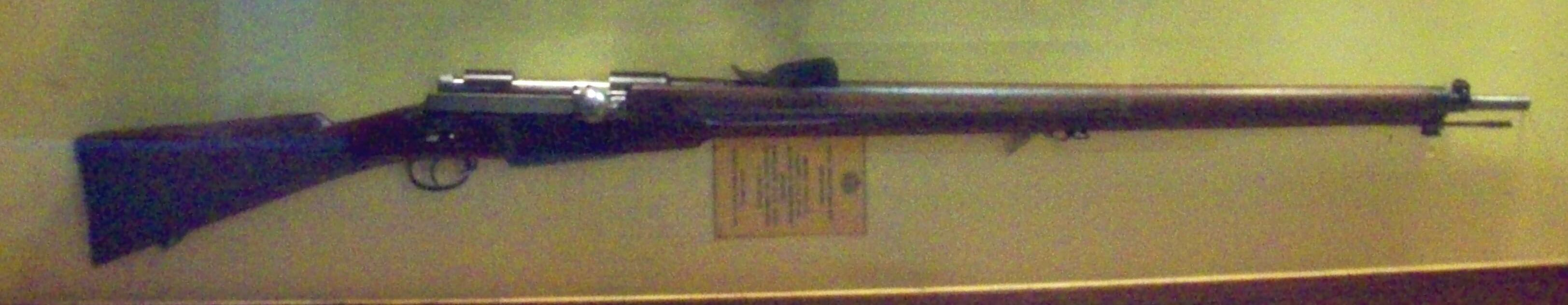
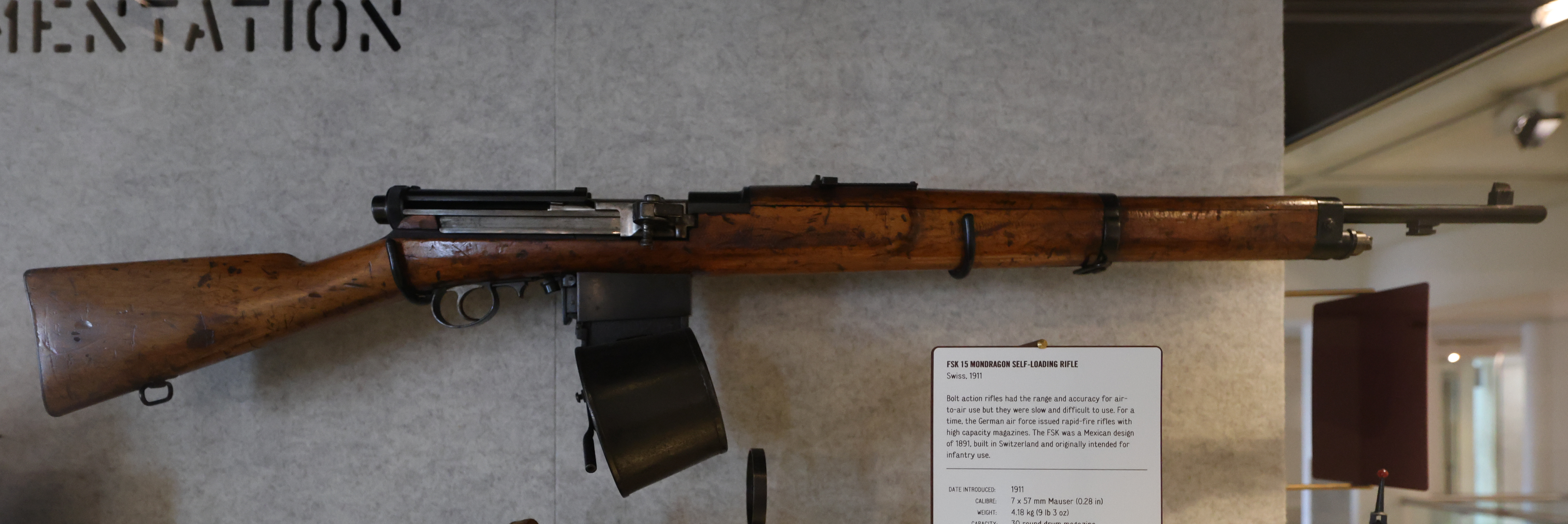
- Mondragón M1894 straight-pull rifle (top) and FSK 15 Mondragon self-loading rifle (bottom)
- Type: Bolt-action rifle Semi-automatic rifle
- Place of origin: Mexico

Service history
- In service: 1911 (Mexico); 1914–1918 (Germany); 1917–? Switzerland
- Used by: German Empire; Mexico; Switzerland
- Wars: Mexican Revolution; World War I

Production history
- Designer: Manuel Mondragón
- Designed: 1884 (straight-pull bolt-action rifle), patent of 1904 (semi-automatic rifle)
- Manufacturer: Schweizerische Industrie Gesellschaft
- Produced: 1887 (straight-pull bolt-action rifle)
- No. built: ~4000

Specifications
- Mass: 4.18 kilograms (9.2 lb)
- Length: 1,105 millimetres (43.5 in)
- Barrel length: 577 millimetres (22.7 in)
- Cartridge: 7×57mm Mauser; 7.92x57mm Mauser; 7.5x55mm Swiss
- Action: Straight-pull (M1893/94); Gas operation, rotating bolt (M1908)
- Muzzle velocity: 760 metres per second (2,500 ft/s)
- Effective firing range: 800 metres (870 yd)
- Maximum firing range: 2,000 metres (2,200 yd)
- Feed system: The 1908 model utilized 5 round stripper clips into 10 round magazine. The 30-round drum was only used by the German flying corps.
- Sights: rear: ladder, graduated 400–2000 m

The Mondragón rifle refers to one of two rifle designs developed by Mexican artillery officer General Manuel Mondragón. These designs include the straight-pull bolt-action M1893 and M1894 rifles, and Mexico's first self-loading rifle, the M1908 - the first of the designs to see combat use.

== Straight-pull bolt-action rifles ==
Mondragón began working on his initial rifle design in 1891. During his stay in Belgium, he filed a patent application for which he had received a grant on March 23, 1892 (No. 98,947). Mondragón was granted a further Patent on April 20, 1892, from the French Patent Office (No. 221,035). He also filed for a Patent for his design with the United States Patent Office on February 8, 1893, which was granted on March 24, 1896 (No. 557,079).

The rifle, referred to as model M1893, was of a straight-pull, bolt-action design, chambered in the 6.5×48mm cartridge (also developed by Mondragón) or the 5.2x68mm cartridge (developed by Colonel Rubin), with a fixed magazine which held an 8-round en-bloc clip. The bolt was locked by two pairs of six small radially-arranged lugs (reminiscent of, e. g., AR-15) locking in helical grooves in the receiver. The rifle operated with three settings: "A" (safe), "L" (normal operation), and "R" (rapid). The "automatic" fire setting allowed the rifle to fire a cartridge each time the bolt was manually cycled to closed position, in similar fashion to Winchester M1897 pump-action shotgun. The rifle could be equipped with a knife bayonet, measuring 41 centimetres (16 in) and 575 grams (1.268 lb), or a blade-type bayonet of 28 centimetres (11 in) length.

At the time of the rifle's design, Mexico did not have any manufacturers capable of producing them to the required tolerances. Mondragón, with the backing of Diaz, subsequently entrusted the Swiss Industrial Company (Schweizerische Industrie Gesellschaft) of Neuhausen, Switzerland with the production of the rifles. SIG received the first order for 50 rifles in 1893, and a second order for 200 rifles followed in 1894. The rifles from the second order were chambered in the 5.2 × 68mm round developed by Swiss colonel Eduard Rubin, and were referred to as the model M1894 (to differentiate them from the versions chambered in the 6.5mm cartridge).

== Self-loading rifle ==
Mondragón continued his work, and on August 8, 1904, he filed a patent application (No. 219,989) for his new design for a self-loading rifle. The Patent (No. 853,715) was granted on May 14, 1907.

The design was adopted by the Mexican Army in 1908 as the Fusil Porfirio Díaz Sistema Mondragón Modelo 1908. The same year, the Mexican government contracted with SIG for the production of 4,000 M1908 rifles, chambered in the 7×57mm Mauser Mexican service cartridge. A few number of samples arrived to Mexico in a number no greater than forty units. The rifle's inability to cope with the poor quality of ammunition available at the time, along with the high unit cost of SFr160 per rifle, led to the cancellation of the order by the Mexican government.

The Mondragón Modelo 1908 was a gas-operated rifle with a rotating bolt using a cylinder and piston arrangement, a design considered unusual at the time. The bolt and the locking lugs was very similar to the bolt-action rifle. A switch, located on the charging handle, would disengage the bolt from the gas system, allowing the firearm to effectively operate as a straight-pull bolt-action rifle. The Mondragón Modelo 1908 rifles were fitted with a bipod. In addition to the knife bayonet introduced with the previous rifles, Mondragón designed a spade bayonet for use with the Modelo 1908, for which he filed a patent application (No. 631,283) on June 6, 1911.

== Use during the Mexican Revolution ==
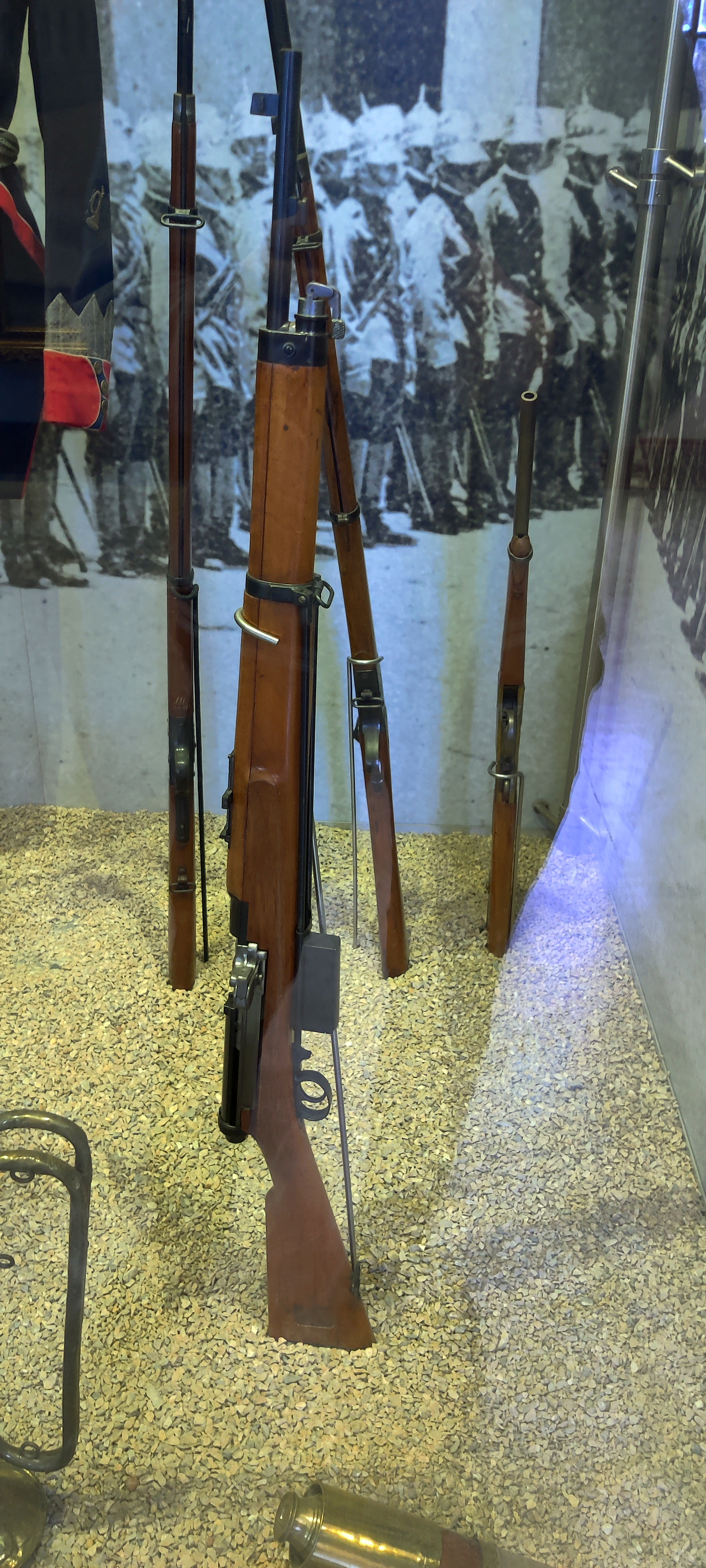
A Mondragón M1908 in the National Museum of History of Mexico

A few of the Mondragón rifles may have been used by Mexican soldiers during an ambush on Pancho Villa. Although some sources claim that the Mexican Army had used the rifle since 1911, two pictures from Crónica Ilustrada Revolución Mexicana, Volume 1 on pages 100 and 159 and an article from Guns magazine suggest that the rifle was in service as early as 1910.

== World War I German service ==
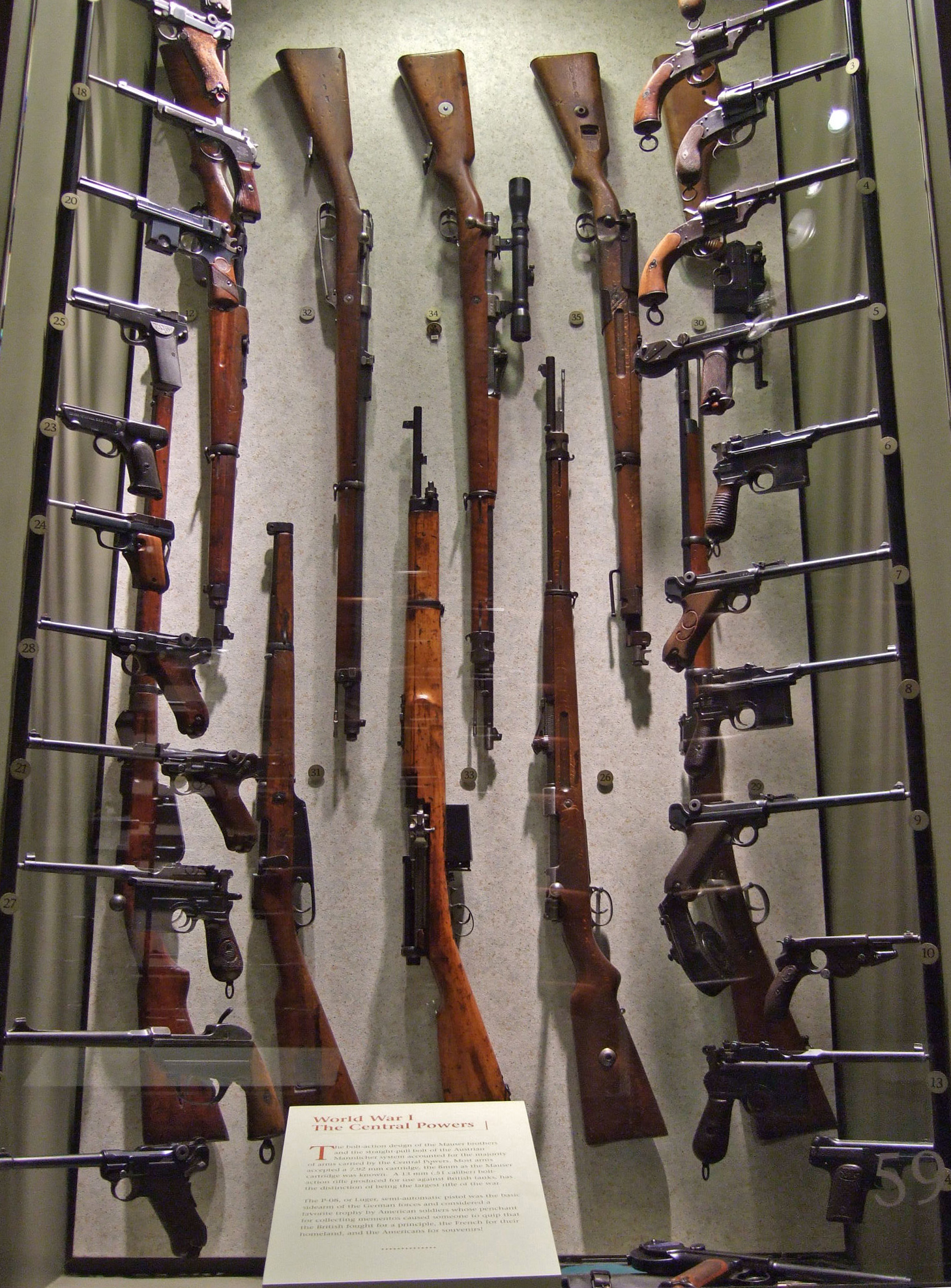
Variety of WWI German rifles and pistols. The Mondragón is the center most rifle

In 1915, the German Empire bought the remainder of the M1908 model rifles produced by SIG (as many as 4000 units, depending on the total SIG production for their Mexican contract). The Germans tried to modify the rifles to chamber the 7.92×57mm S-Patrone, the service cartridge of Germany until the end of World War I, but their attempts were unsuccessful. The rifles were tested by the German Army, but they proved highly susceptible to fouling caused by mud and dirt in the trenches, a common problem even with less complex designs such as the Canadian Ross Mk III straight-pull bolt-action rifle.

The Imperial German Flying Corps (Luftstreitkräfte) decided to adopt the rifle, where operating conditions lessened the chances of the action being fouled by mud, and issued two rifles to each aircraft's crew. The M1903 proved to be a significant improvement over the bolt-action Gewehr 98 rifles and Parabellum-Pistole pistols usually issued to crews. The M1908 rifle was re-designated as the Fl.-S.-K. 15 (Flieger-Selbstladekarabiner, Modell 1915 - Aviator's Selfloading Carbine, Model 1915) and was issued with 30-round drum magazines. The drum magazine issued with the Fl.-S.-K. 15 was that designed and patented by Friedrich Blum, with a later 32-round version of the drum magazine (Trommelmagazin 08) that had been designed for the 1913 Parabellum-Pistole (LP 08). The corps used the Mondragón rifle until a sufficient number of machine guns equipped with a synchronization gear became available, after which the M1908 was phased out of service and given to the navy. Very few of the Mondragón rifles survived the war, although almost all of the rifles were still in use by the Imperial German Navy when the First World War ended. The usage of the Mondragón in the German Imperial Navy would involve destroyer crews and Seabattlions Pioneers being entirely issued Mondragón and pistol carbines In Switzerland, the Mondragón self-loading rifle was modified to use the 7.5×55mm Swiss cartridge, came equipped with a 12-round magazine and a Hülsenfangkorb (a device to collect the ejected cartridges).

The Mondragón rifle was also briefly installed in the World War I era two-seater aircraft, the Häfeli DH and the Blériot, however it was soon replaced by fully automatic weapons.

== Mondragón M1908 scheme and operating procedure ==
Mondragón United States patent from 1907 for the design of a semi-automatic rifle:

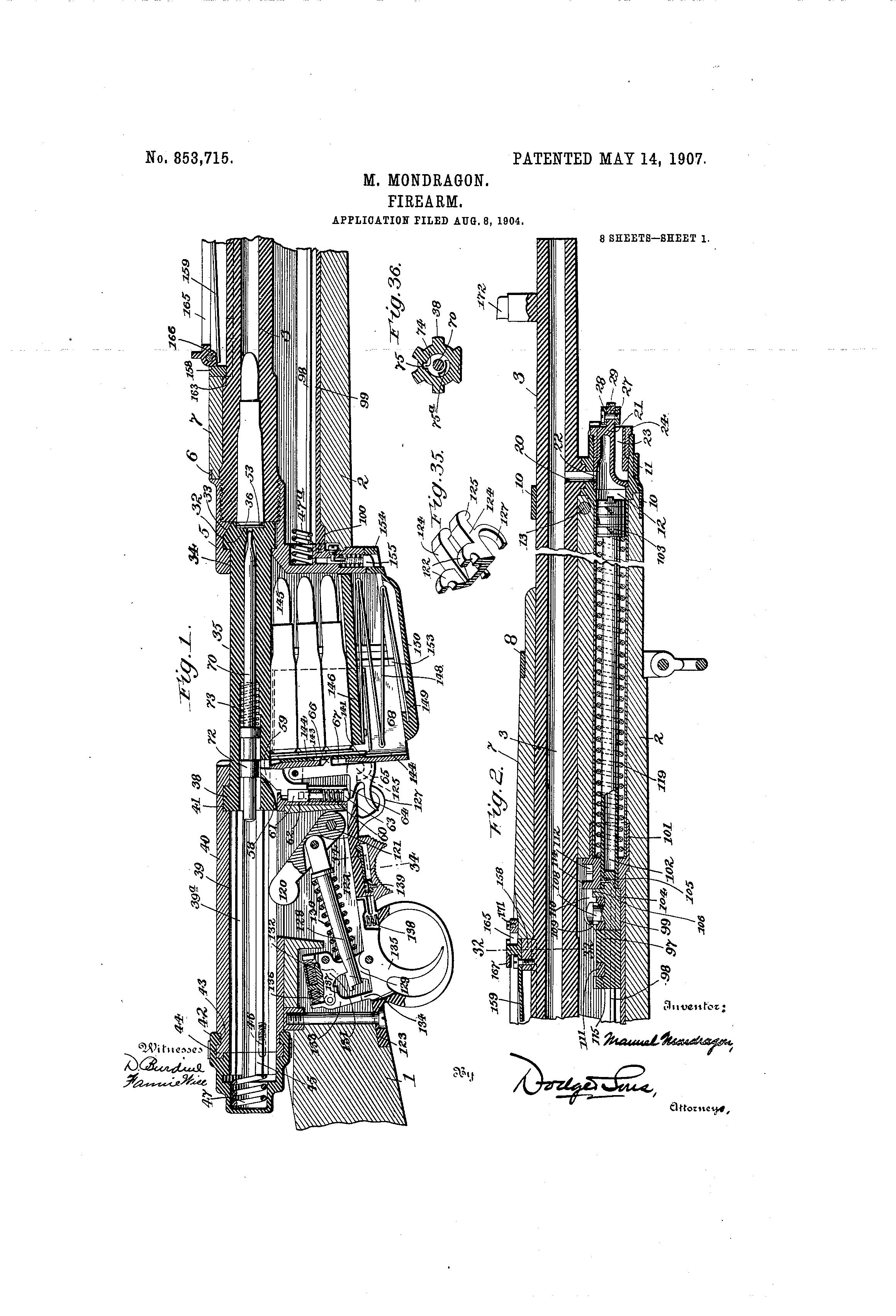

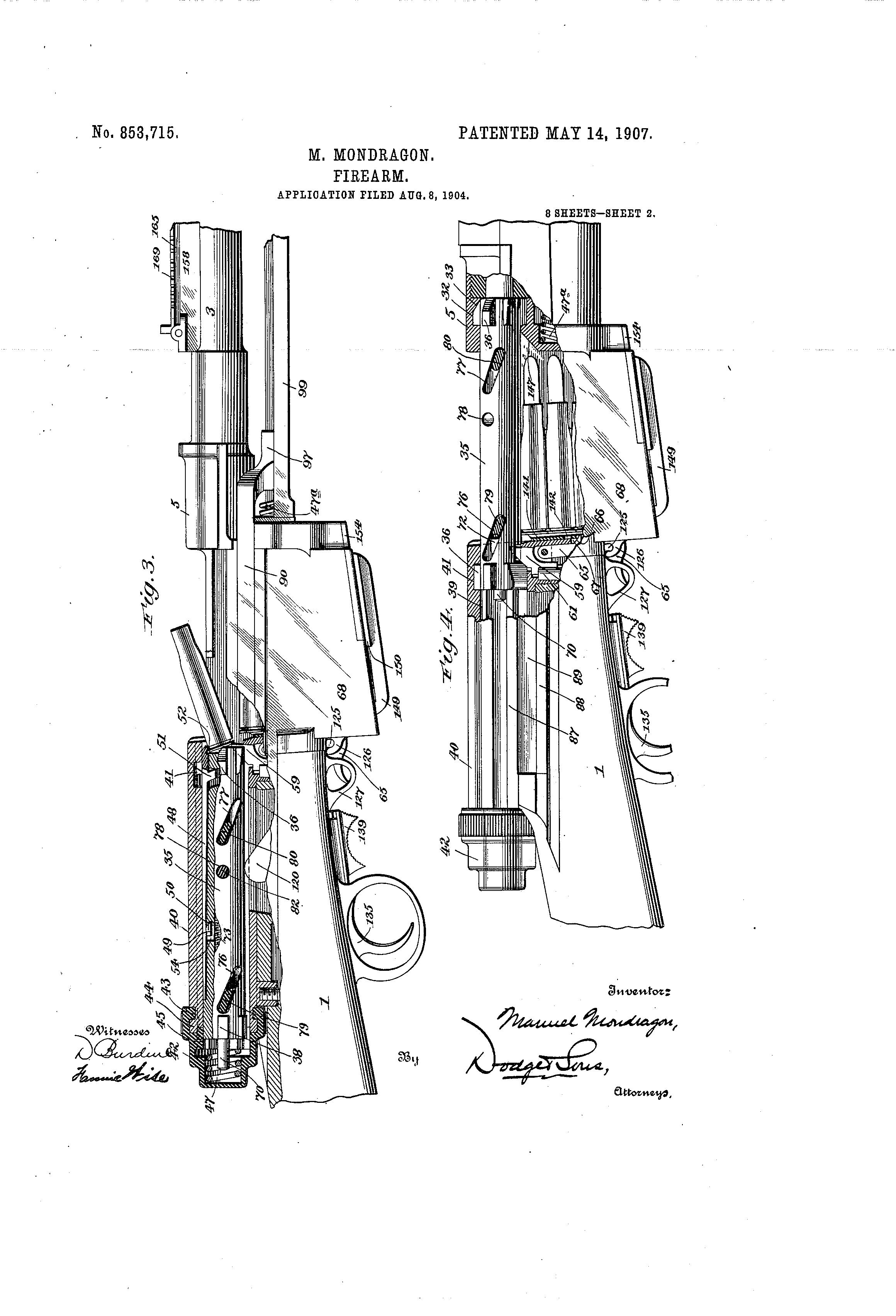

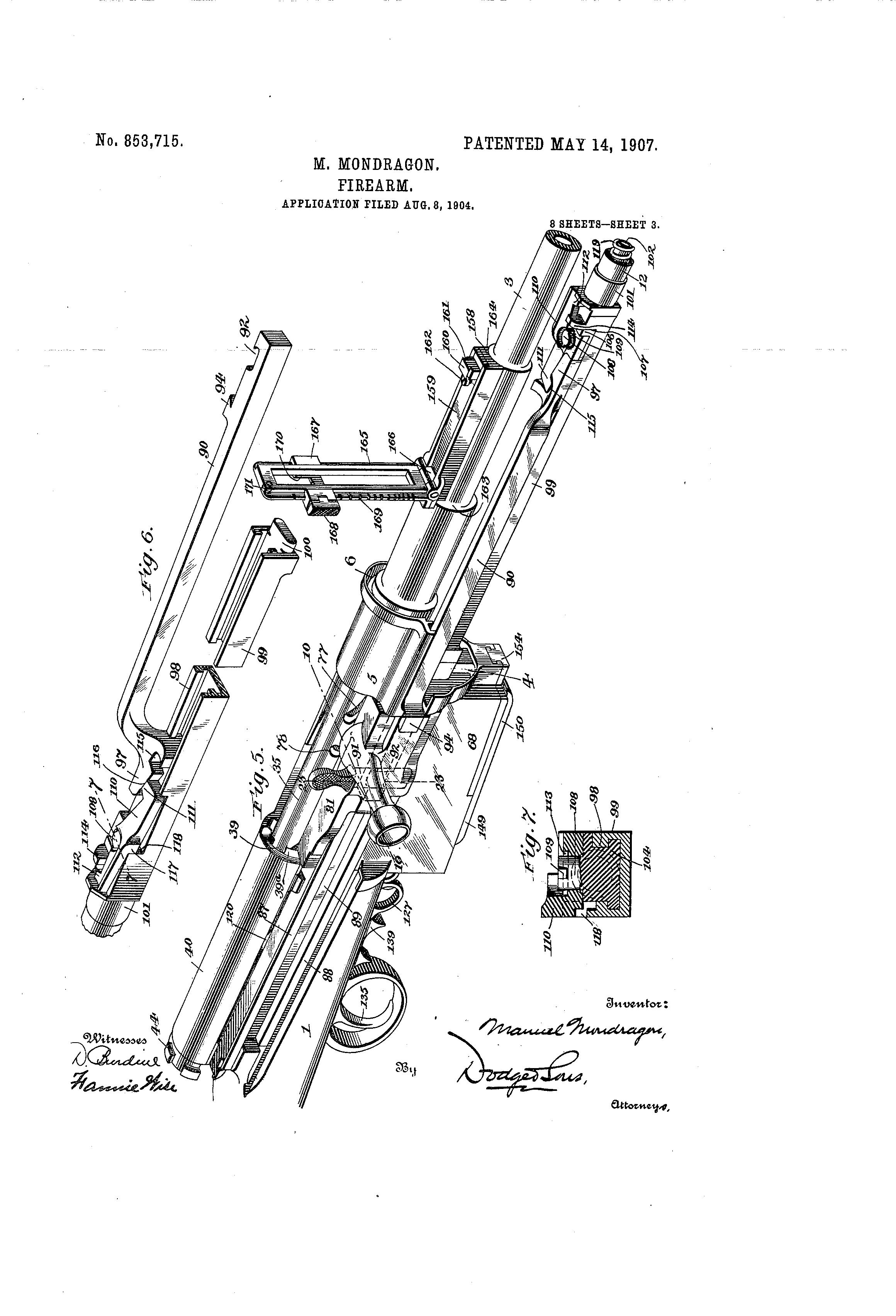

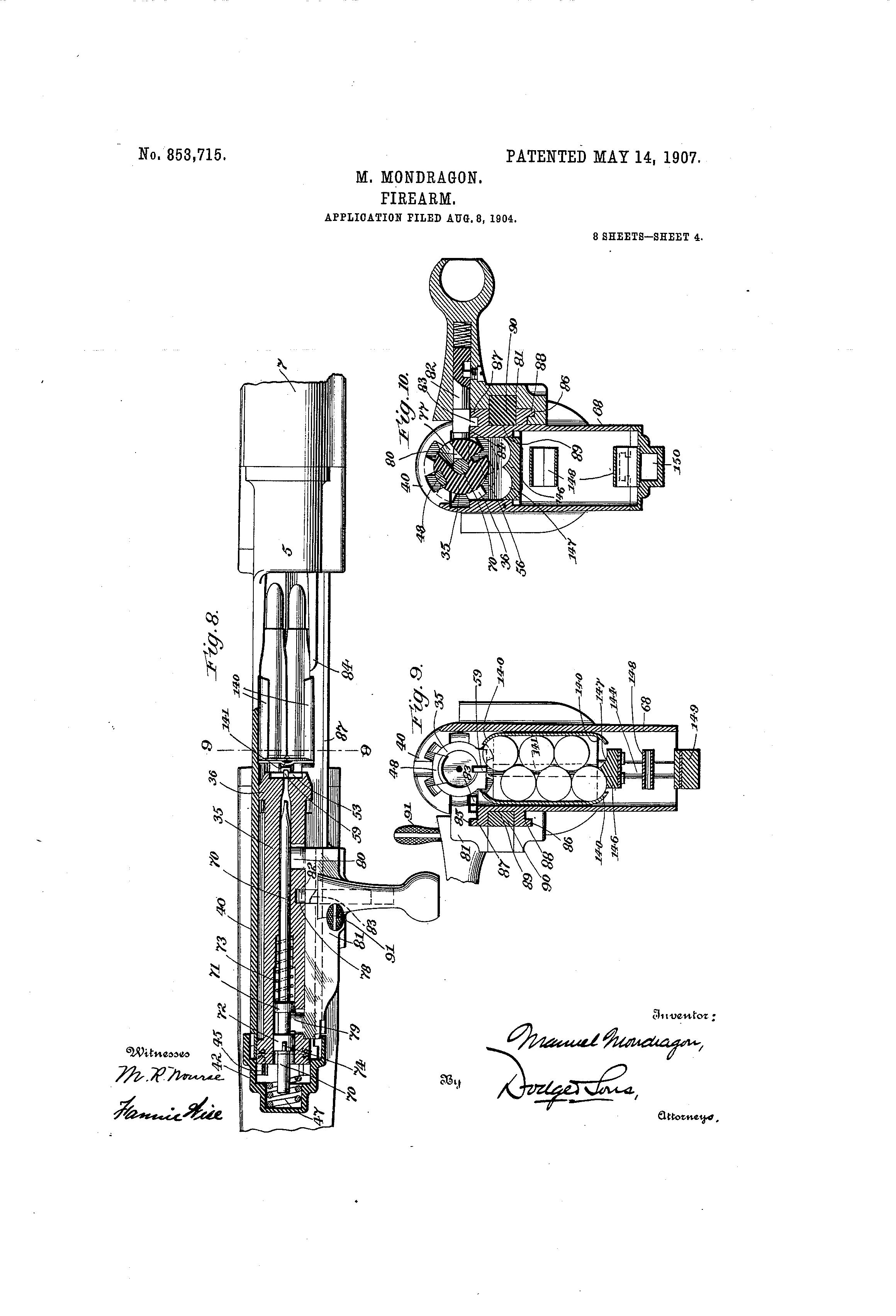

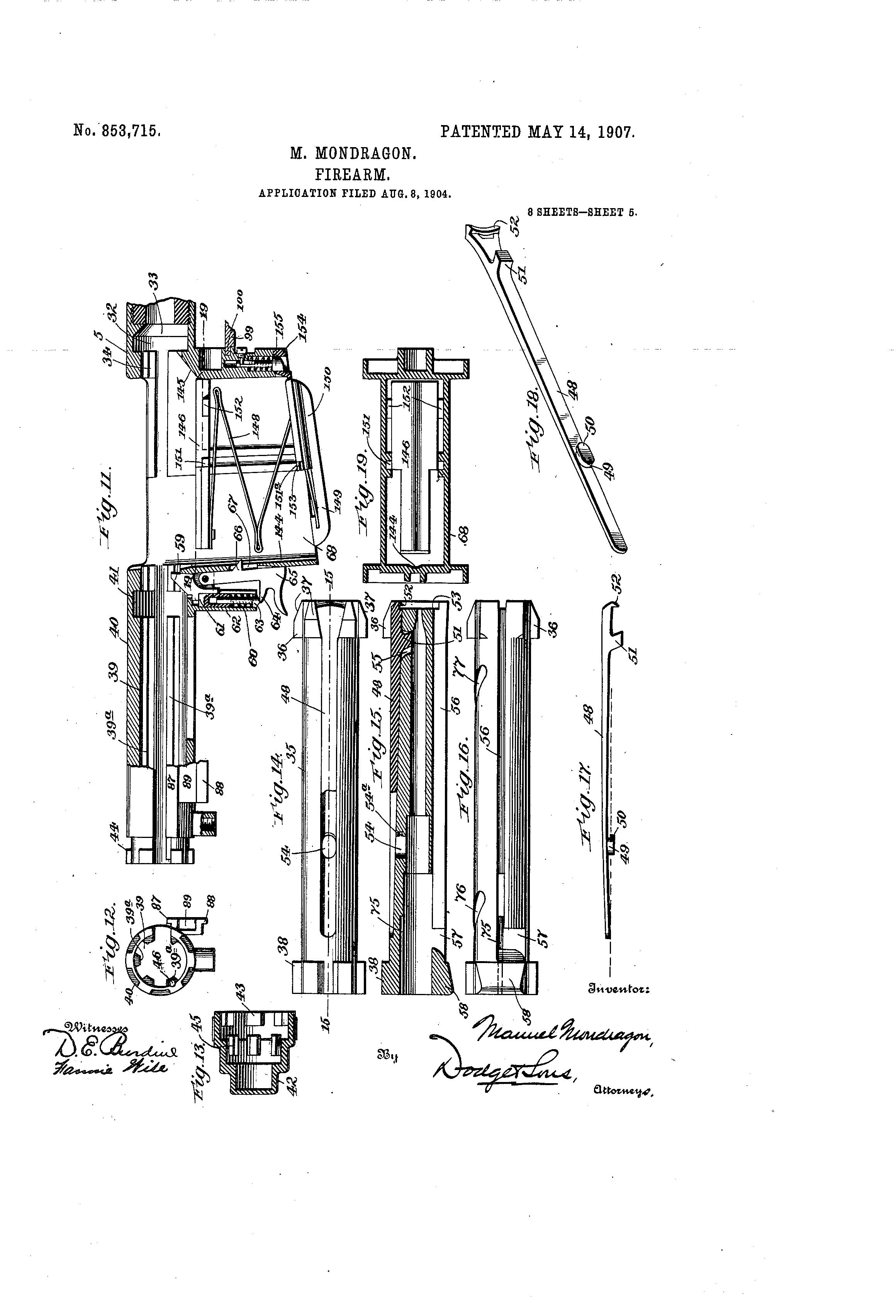

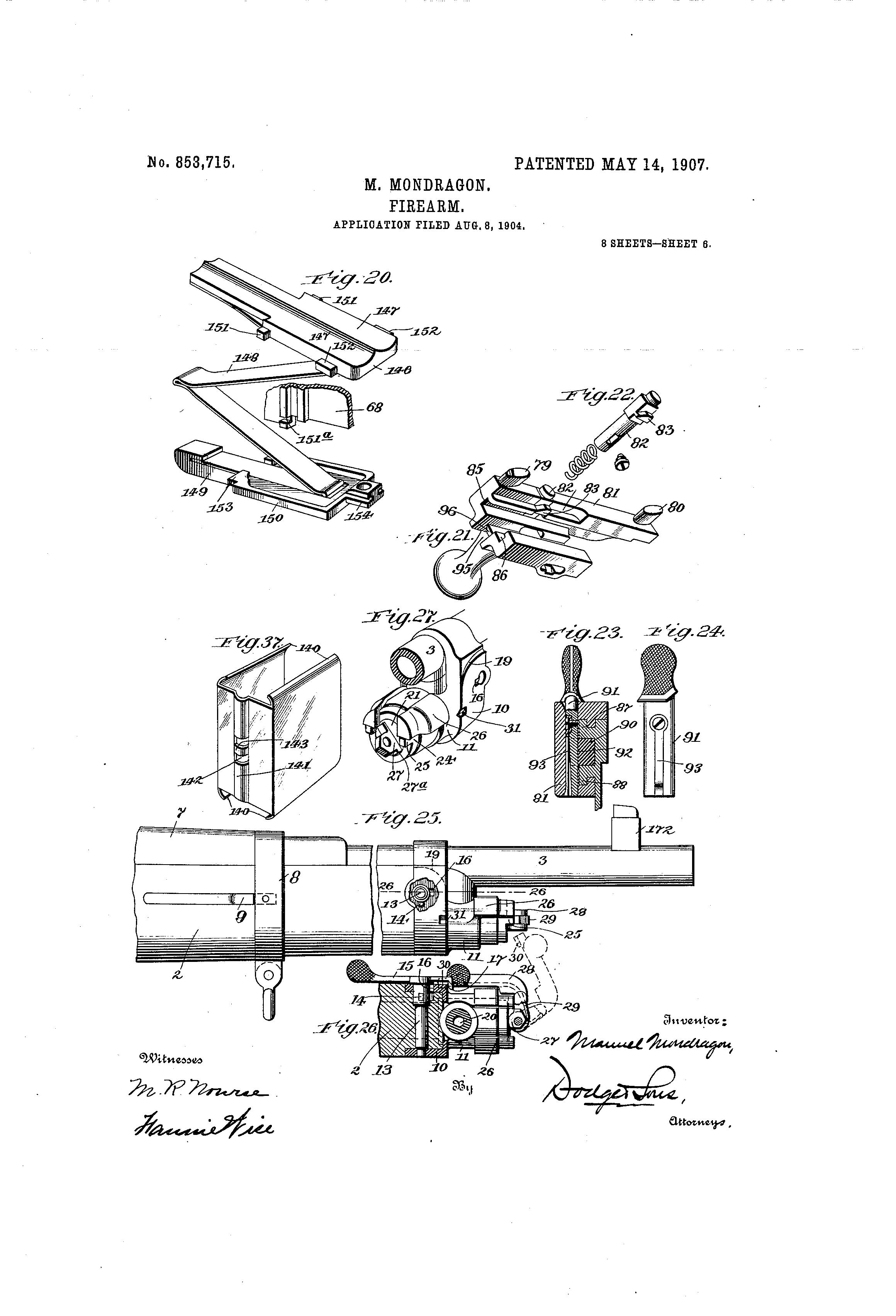

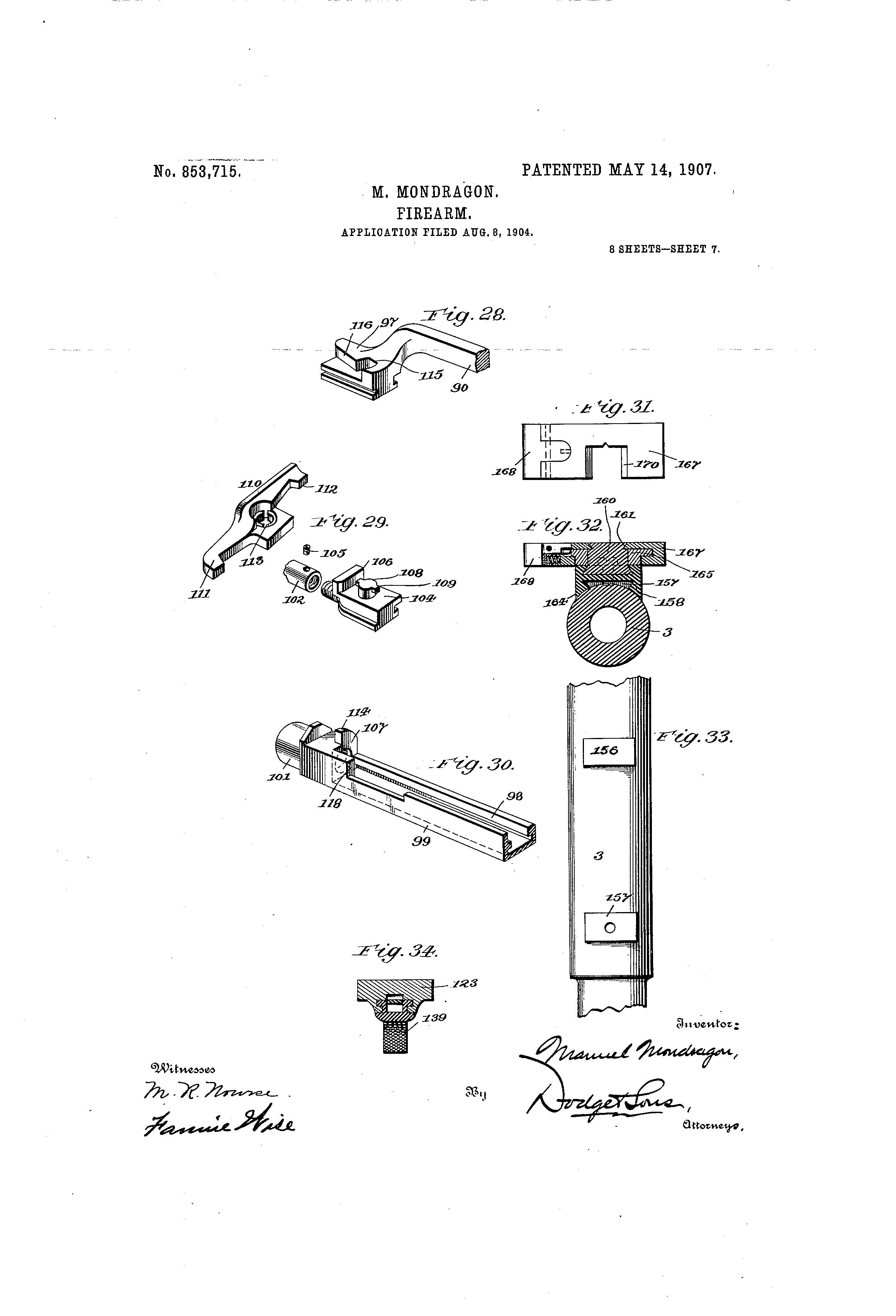

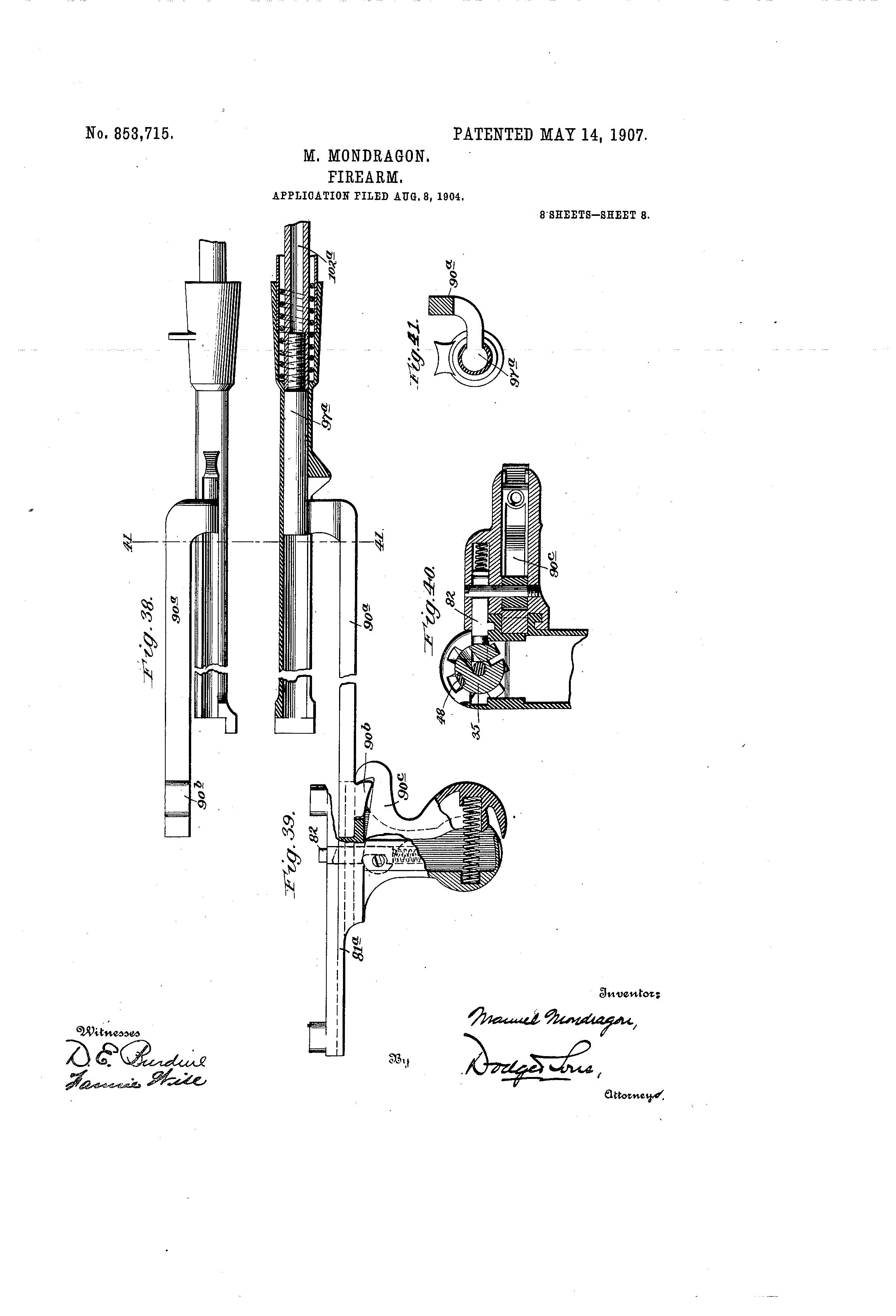

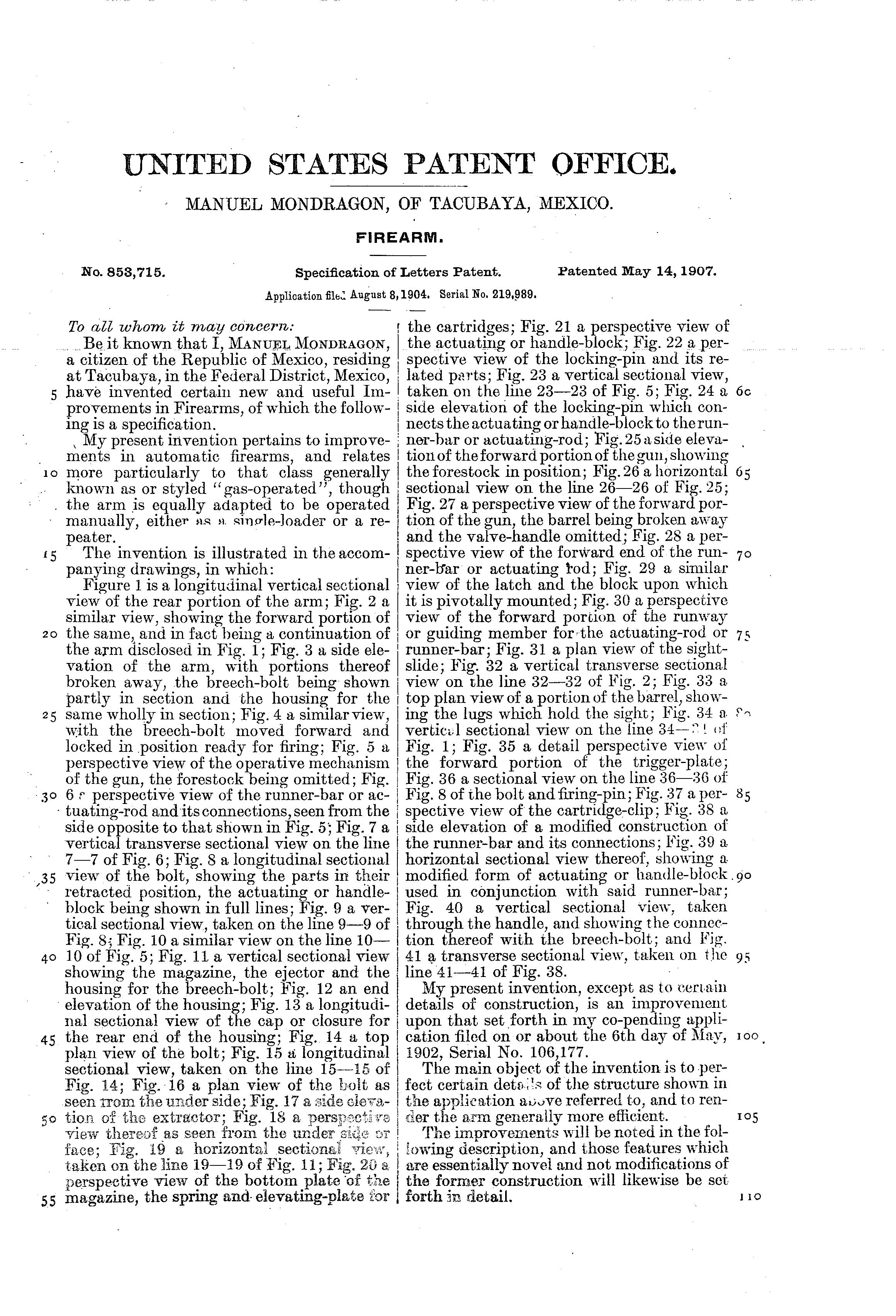

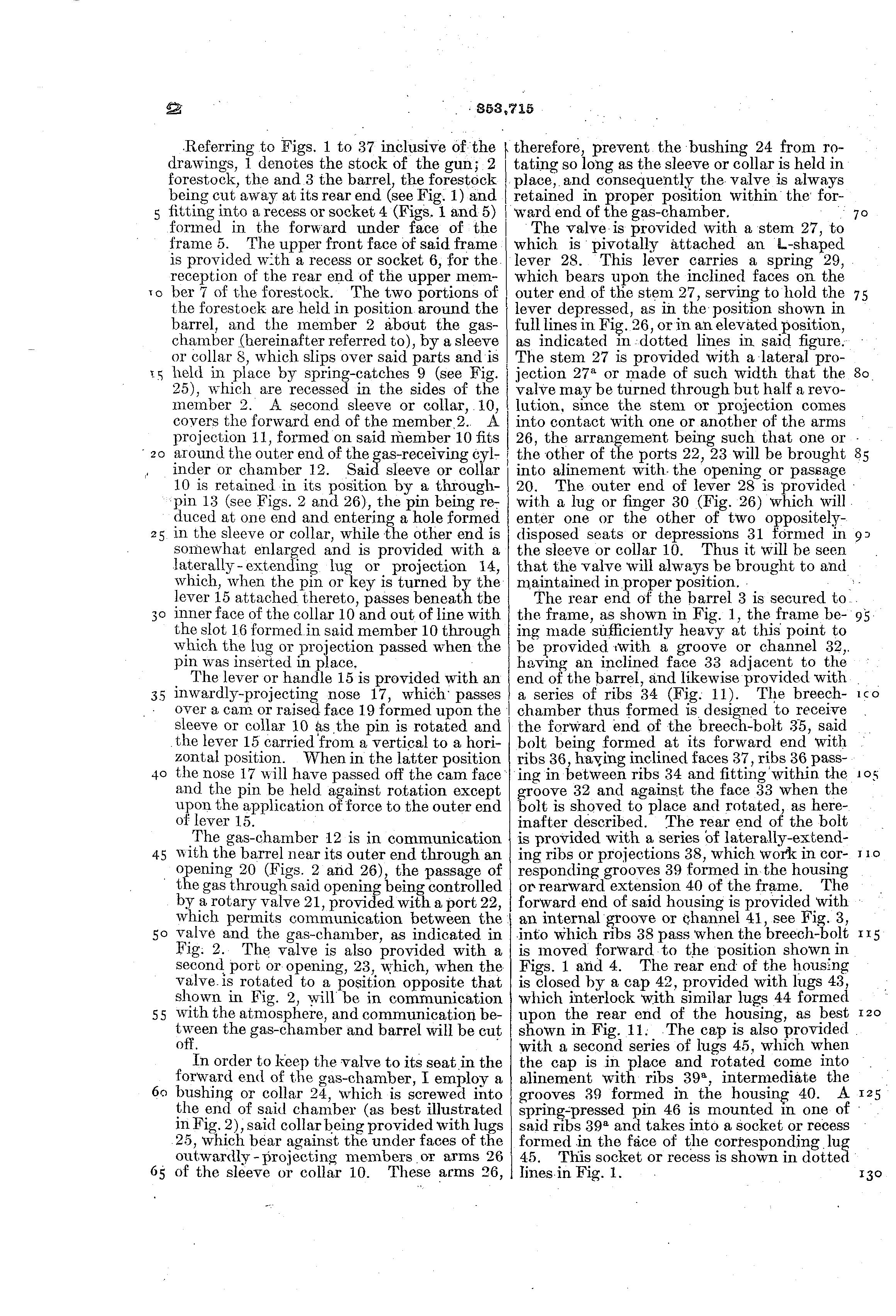

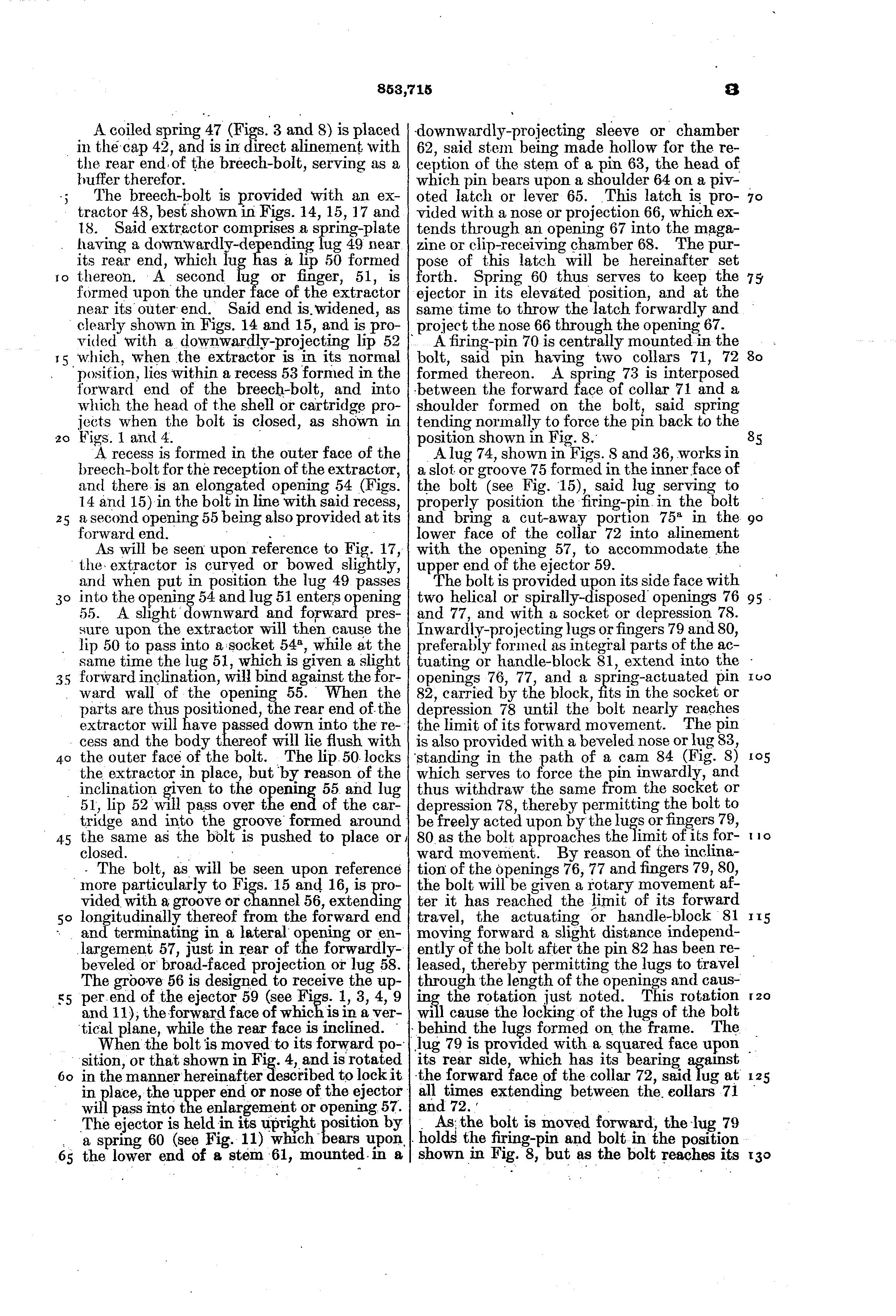

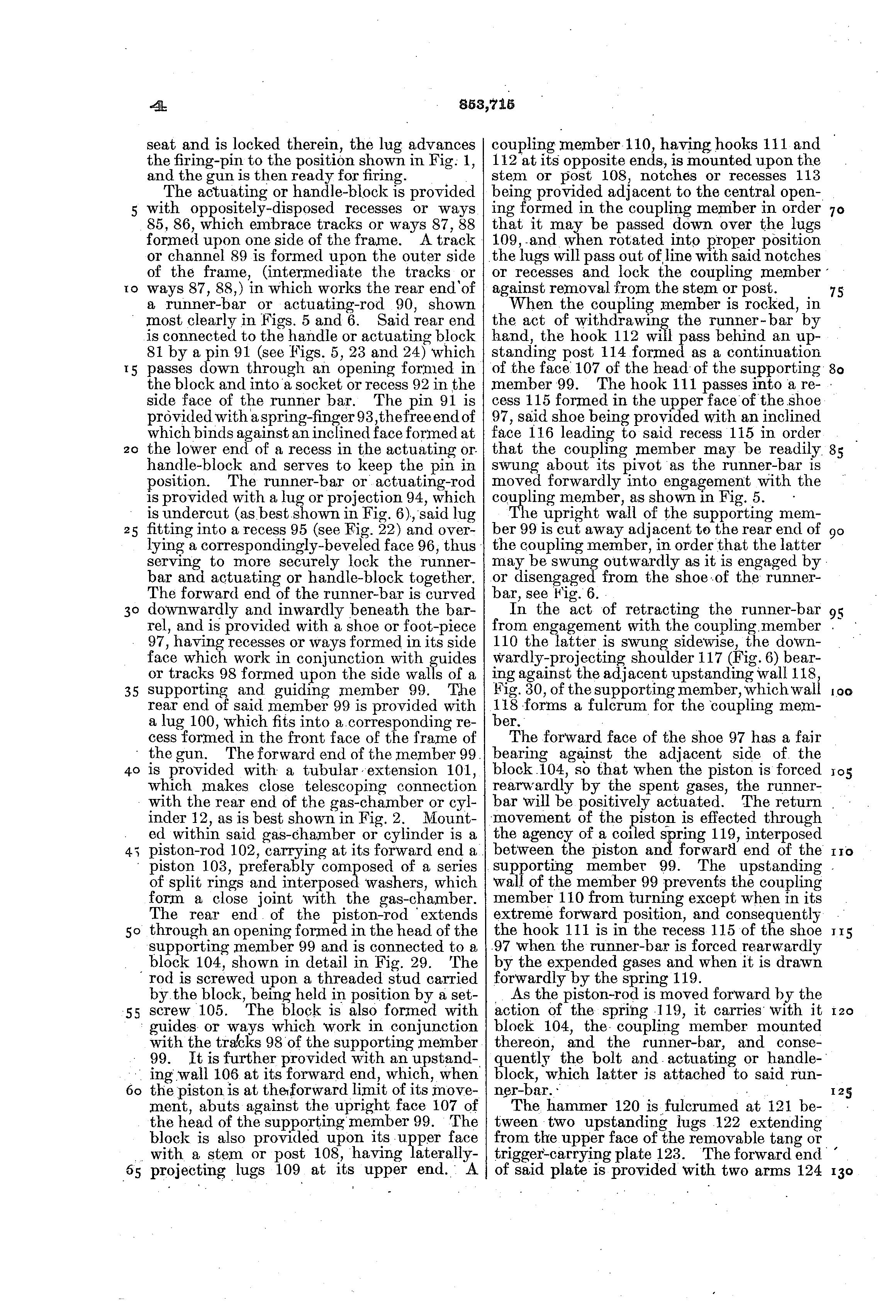

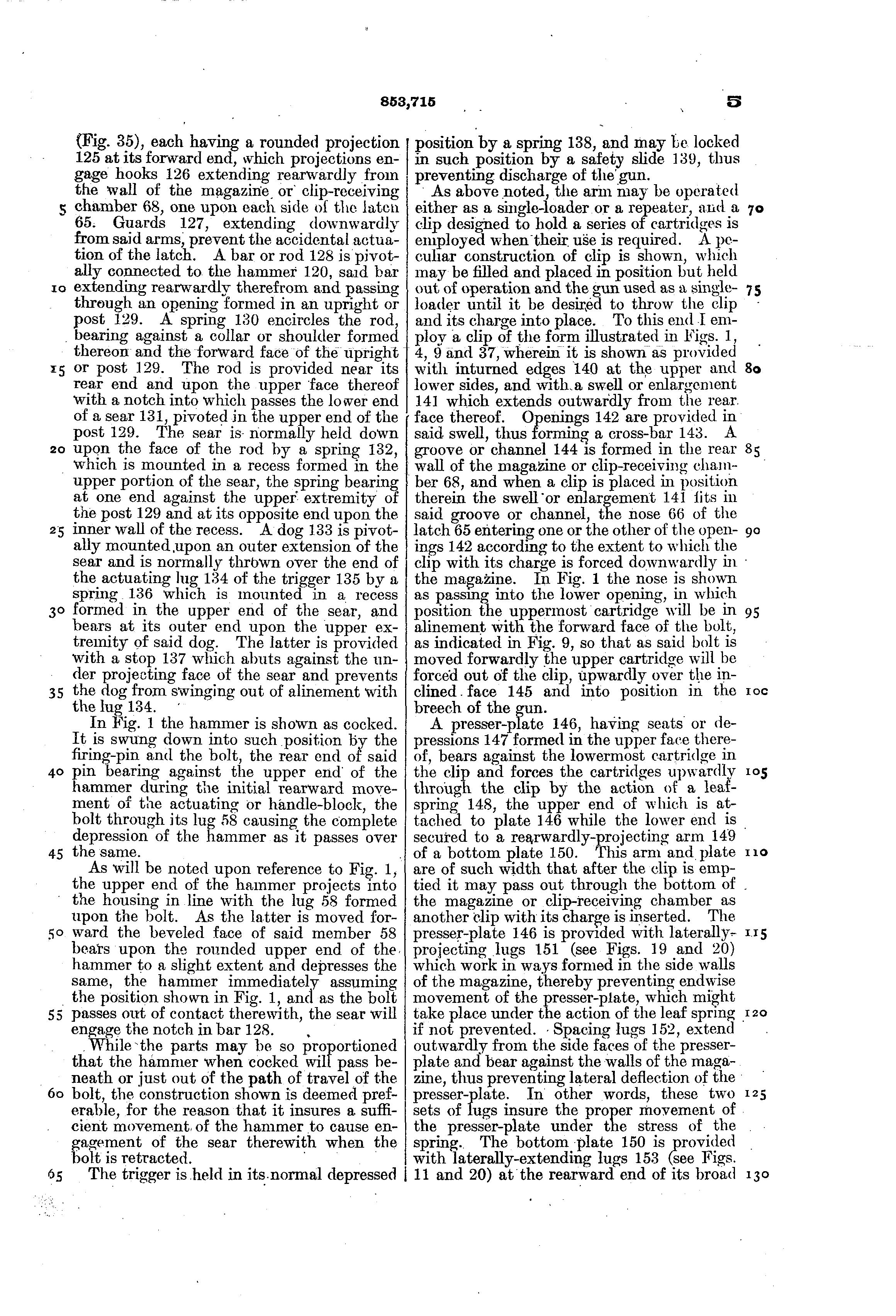

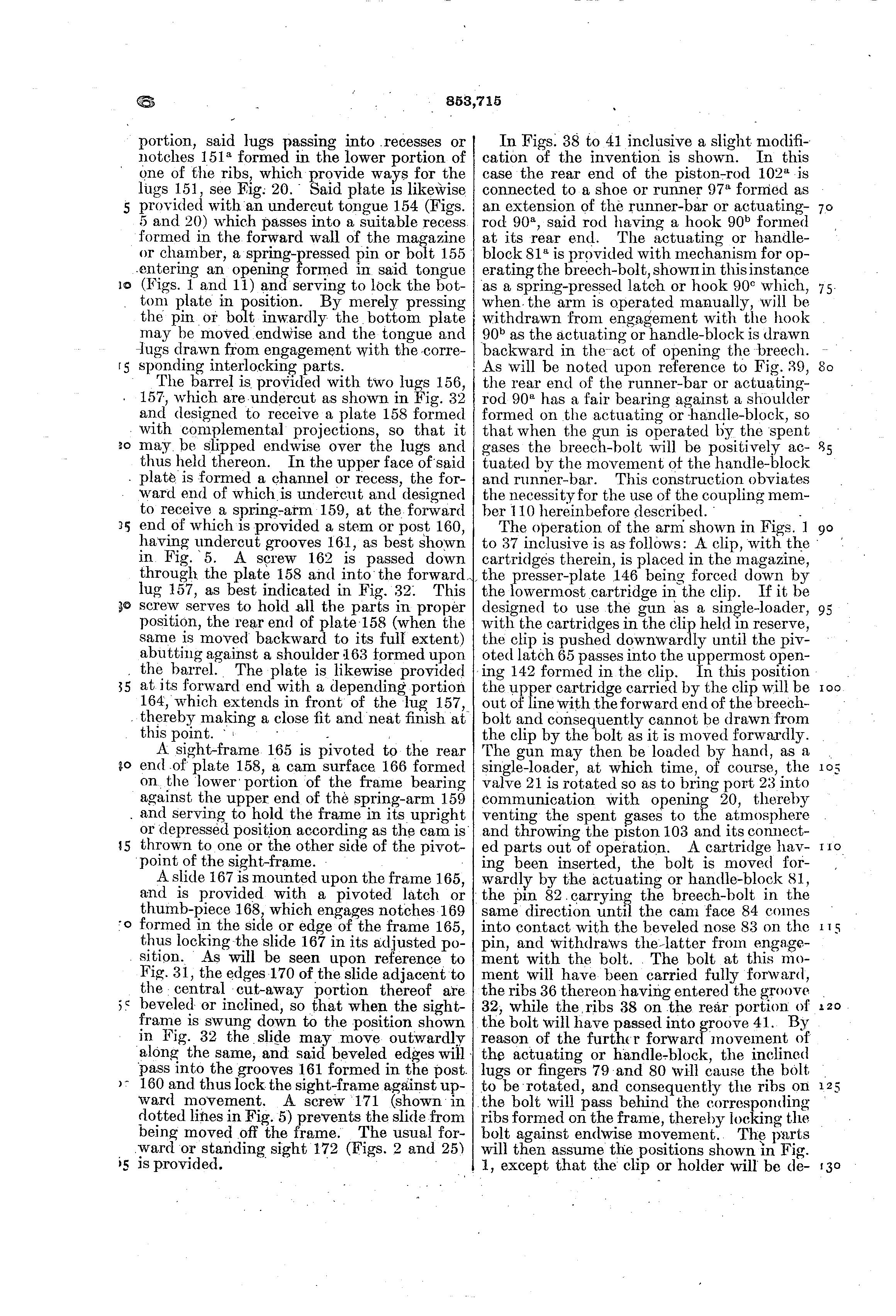

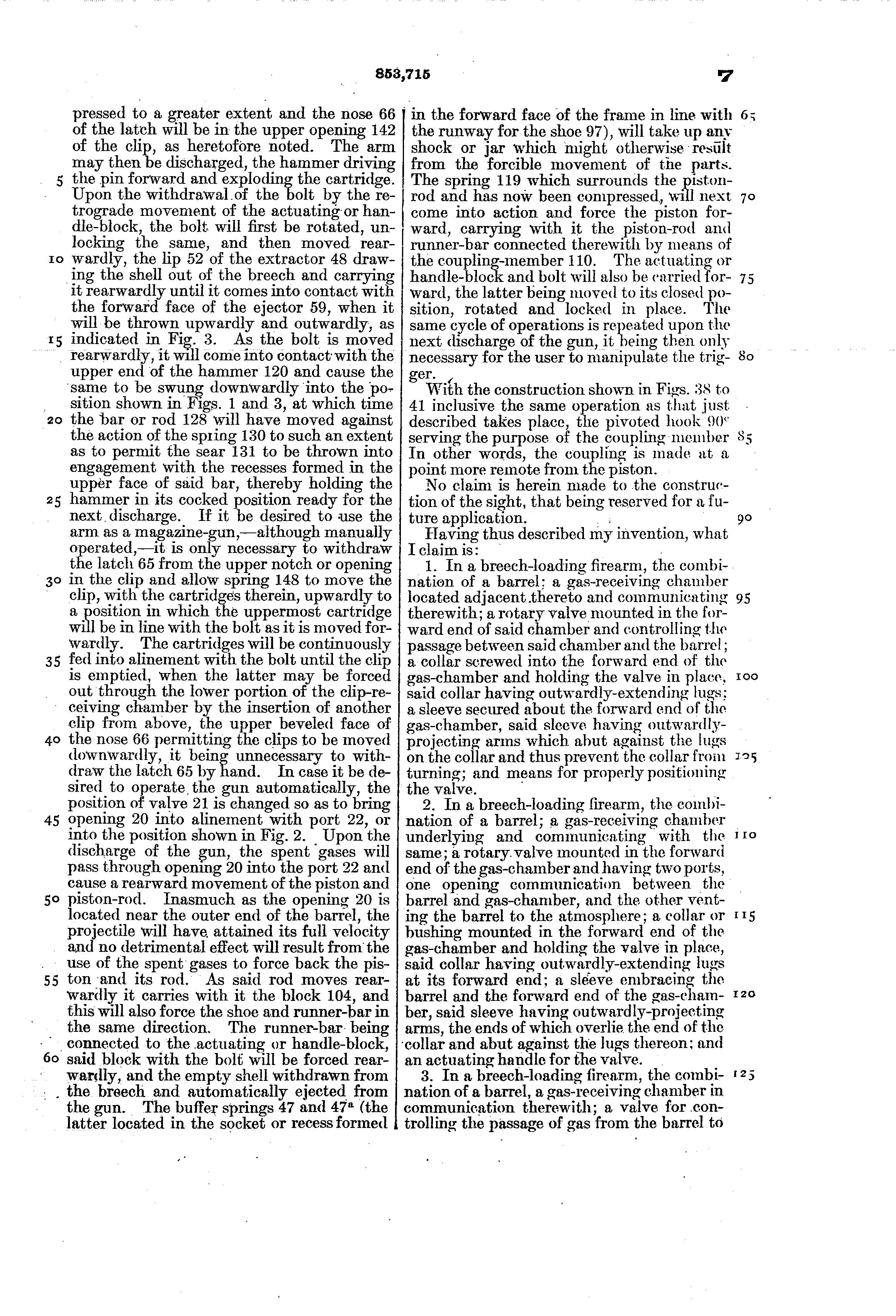

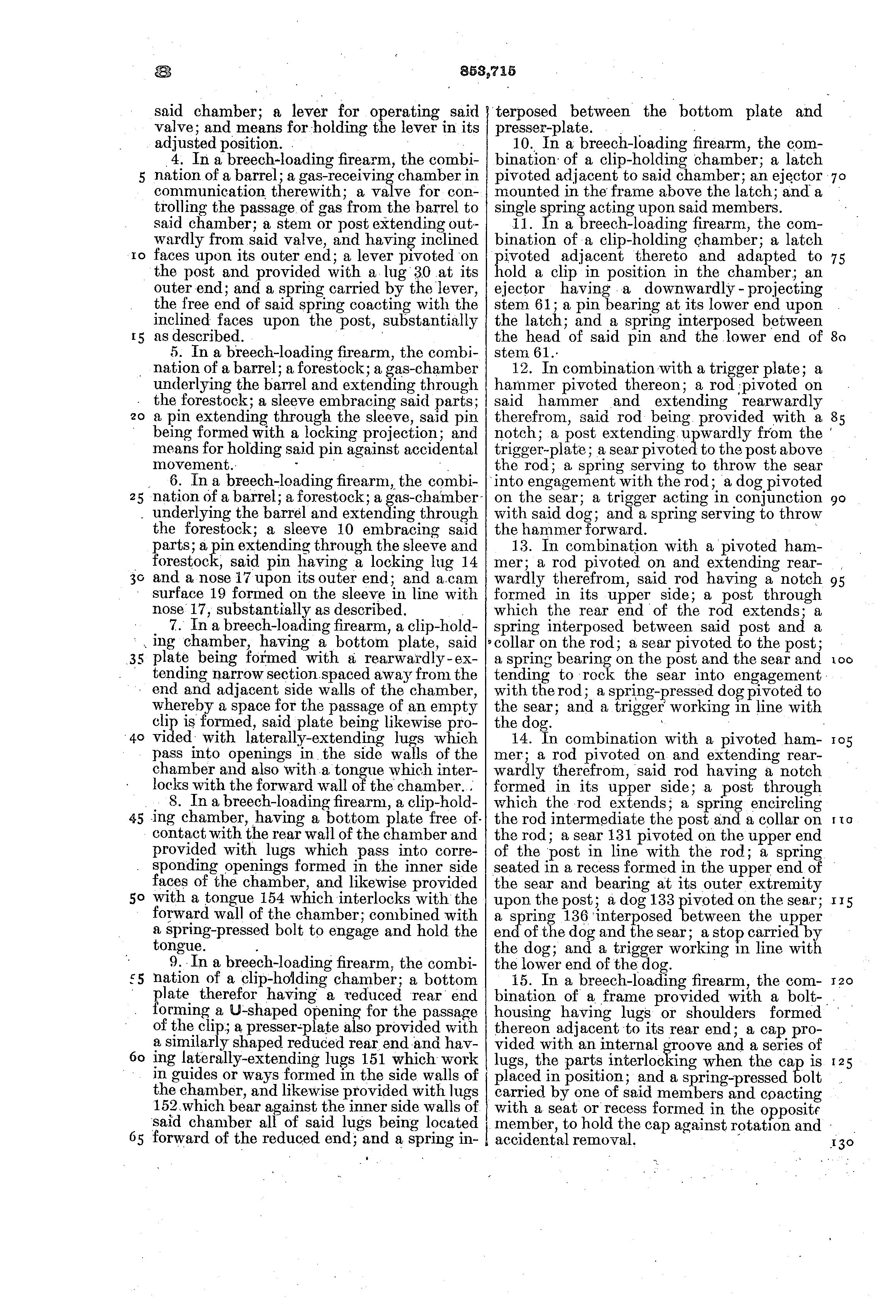

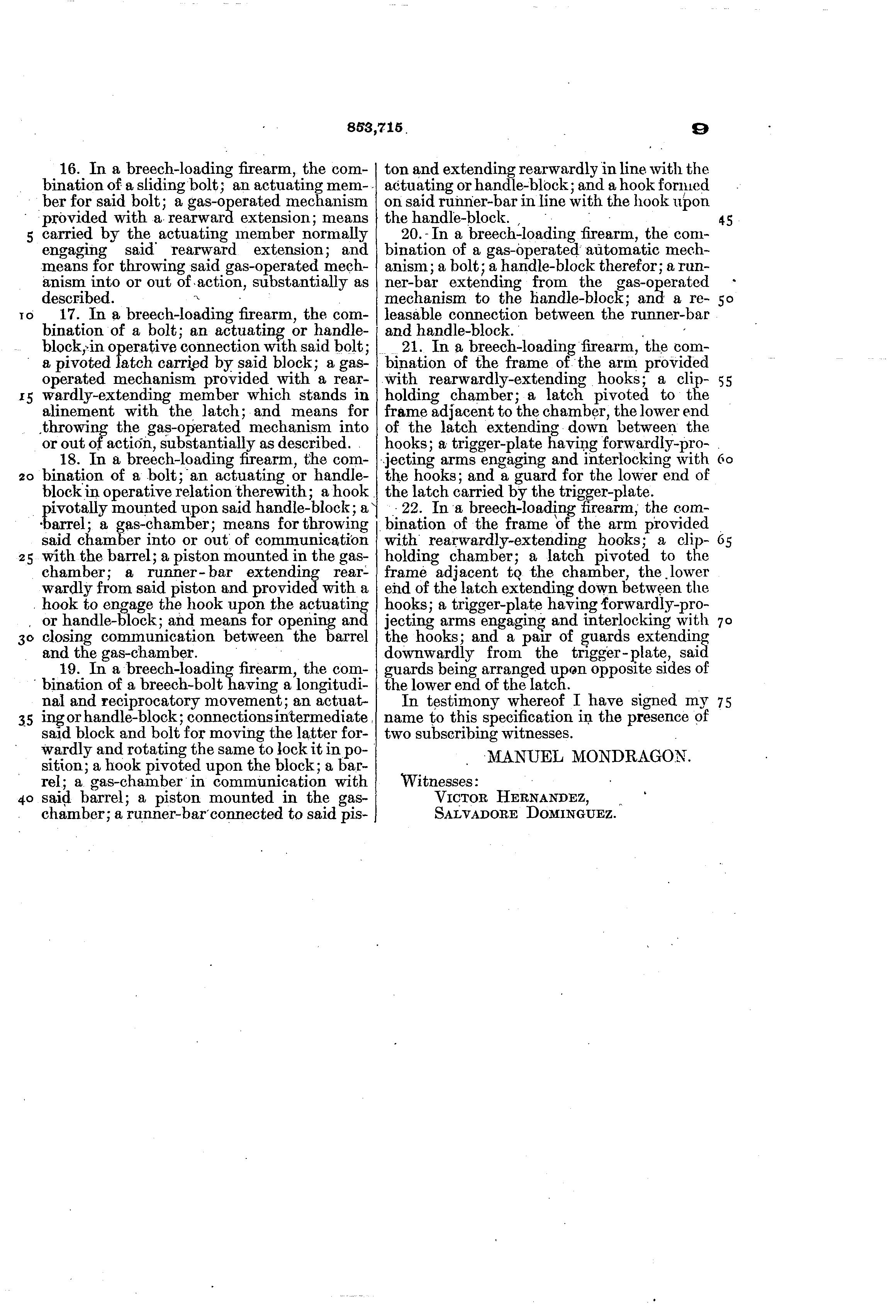

== See also ==
- Farquhar-Hill rifle
- Mauser self-loading carbine
- Fusil Automatique Modèle 1917
