= William Beardmore and Company =

British engineering and shipbuilding company

William Beardmore and Company, Ltd.
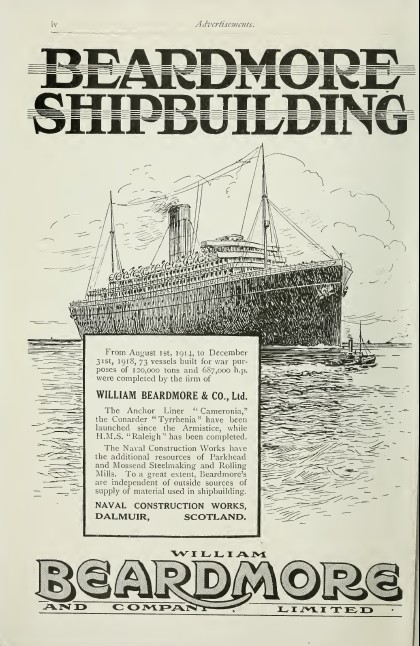
- Company type: Limited company
- Industry: Steelmaking, heavy engineering, shipbuilding, locomotive building, ordnance manufacture, automotive, aviation
- Founded: 1887
- Defunct: 1983 (Closure of Parkhead Forge)
- Fate: dissolved
- Headquarters: Parkhead, Glasgow; Dalmuir, Clydebank
- Key people: William Beardmore
- Products: Castings, Forgings, Oil Tankers, Naval ships, Steam locomotives, Fixed-wing aircraft, Airships, Automobiles, Motorcycles

William Beardmore and Company was a British engineering and shipbuilding conglomerate based in Glasgow and the surrounding Clydeside area. It was active from 1886 to the mid-1930s and at its peak employed about 40,000 people. It was founded and owned by William Beardmore, later Lord Invernairn, after whom the Beardmore Glacier was named.

== History ==
=== Forged steel castings, armour plate and naval guns ===
The Parkhead Forge, in the east end of Glasgow, became the core of the company. It was established by Reoch Brothers & Co in 1837 and was later acquired by Robert Napier in 1841 to make forgings and iron plates for his new shipyard in Govan. Napier was given the contract to build HMS Black Prince, sister ship to the Royal Navy's first true ironclad warship, HMS Warrior. Parkhead was contracted to make the armour for her, but failed, so the manager, William Rigby called in William Beardmore Snr, who at the time was superintendent of the General Steam Navigation Company in Deptford, to help. Beardmore became a partner in the business and, moving to Glasgow was joined by his brother Isaac and son, William Jr. On the premature death of William Snr, Isaac retired and William Jnr became sole partner. He founded William Beardmore and Company in 1886. By 1896, the works covered an area of 25 acres (10 ha) and was the largest steelworks in Scotland, specialising in the manufacture of steel forgings for the shipbuilding industry of the River Clyde. By this time, they had begun the manufacture of steel armour plate and later diversified into the manufacture of heavy naval guns, such as the BL 9.2 inch gun Mk IX–X and BL 15 inch Mk I naval gun.

=== Shipbuilding ===
British Enterprise, built by Beardmore in 1921

In 1900, Beardmore took over the shipyard of Robert Napier and Sons in Govan, a logical diversification from the company's core steel forgings business. In 1900, Beardmore also began construction of what would become The Naval Construction Yard, at Dalmuir in west Clydebank; the largest and most advanced shipyard in the United Kingdom at the time.

However, this acquisition and construction overstretched company's limited financial resources and after being refused additional borrowings it had to raise new funds otherwise. In 1902, the structure of the company was reorganized, and with the encouragement of the Admiralty half of the shares were bought by Vickers. Armstrong Whitworth also considered investing but decided against it due to high debt load of the company.

HMS Agamemnon was the new Dalmuir yard's first order to complete, in 1906. This work was facilitated by the construction of the Arrol Gantry, a large steel framework supporting nine high-speed electric cranes. (Note: A development of this gantry was built shortly afterwards for Harland and Wolff in Belfast, the Arrol Gantry spanning two building berths, and used in the construction of RMS Titanic and her sisters.) Beardmore eventually sold the company's Govan shipyard to Harland and Wolff in 1912. Other notable warships produced by Beardmores at Dalmuir include the dreadnoughts HMS Conqueror (1911), HMS Benbow (1913) and HMS Ramillies (1917). In 1917, Beardmore completed the aircraft carrier HMS Argus, the first carrier to have a full-length flight deck. Beardmore expanded the activities at Dalmuir to include the manufacture of all sorts or arms and armaments, the site employing 13,000 people at its peak.

The post war recession hit the firm hard, and the shipyard was forced to close in 1930. Part of the site and some of the existing buildings later became incorporated into ROF Dalmuir, part was used by the General Post Office for their cable-laying ships.

==== Merchant ships ====
Beardmore also built oil tankers, including:

- British Commerce, British Tanker Company, (1922)
- British Enterprise, British Tanker Company, (1921)
- British Merchant, British Tanker Company, (1922)
- British Trader, British Tanker Company, (1921)

=== Land weapons ===
During World War I, Beardmore produced and repaired field artillery such as BL 6-inch 26 cwt howitzer or QF 18-pounder gun. After the war it also developed a 40 mm anti-tank gun, a set of various field artillery systems and the so-called Beardmore-Farquhar light machine gun from the Farquhar–Hill rifle but none of the weapons was adopted due to the glut on the market caused by military surplus from WWI.

=== Railway locomotives ===
An attempt was made during the 1920s to diversify into the manufacture of railway locomotives at Dalmuir. Twenty 4-6-0 tender locomotives were built for the Great Eastern Railway as part of their class S69. Ninety London and North Western Railway Prince of Wales class locomotives were built between 1921 and 1922, along with an extra exhibition locomotive for the LNWR's successor, the London, Midland and Scottish Railway in 1924. They also built 90 'Jinty' tank engine for the LMS between 1928 and 1929. Beardmore's locomotive production was small compared with the established competition.

Serial numbers	Year	Quantity	Customer	Class	Wheel arrangement	Fleet numbers	Notes
100–134	1920	35	East Indian Railway	HGS	2-8-0	1520–1554	5' 6" gauge. Later all-India 26729–26763.
135–154	1920–21	20	Great Eastern Railway	S69	4-6-0	1541–1560 not in order	To LNER 8541–8560 in 1923; renumbered 1541–1560 .
155–173	1920	19	Nigerian Railways		4-8-0	282–300	3' 6" gauge
174–263	1921–22	90	London and North Western Railway	Prince of Wales	4-6-0	various	to LMS 5755–5844 (not in order) in 1923
264–268	1923	5	Burma Railways	Ns	0-6-6-0	16–20	Metre gauge Mallet locomotives.
269–293	1923	25	Bombay, Baroda and Central India Railway	H (BESA HP)	4-6-0	540–564	5' 6" gauge. Later all-India 24289–24331.
294–295	1923	2	Madras and Southern Mahratta Railway	W (BESA HP)	4-6-0	784–785	5' 6" gauge. Later all-India 24368–24639.
296–298	1923	3	Eastern Bengal Railway	LS (BESA HP)	4-6-0	31–33	5' 6" gauge.
299–303	1924	5	North Western Railway	HPS	4-6-0	2875–2879	5' 6" gauge. Two to Pakistan, three to Eastern Punjab Railway 2815–2817, later all-India 24400–24402.
304	1924	1	Exhibition locomotive	Prince of Wales	4-6-0		Shown at British Empire Exhibition, Wembley 1924–5, then sold to LMS 5845.
305–324	1927	20	London and North Eastern Railway	N7/3	0-6-2T	2642–2661	Renumbered 9683–9702 in 1946 scheme
325–414	1928–29	90	London, Midland and Scottish Railway	3F	0-6-0T	16600–16624, 16685–16749	Renumbered 7517–7541, 7602–7666.
415–416	1928	2	Bombay, Baroda and Central India Railway	BE	Bo-Bo	901–902	5' 6" gauge Battery-electric, later all-India 20198–9.
417–460	1930	44	East Indian Railway	XE	2-8-2	2016–2031, 1981–2003, 2032–2036	5' 6" gauge. Later all-India 22536–22551, 22501–22523, 22552–22556.
461–486	1930	26	North Western Railway	XC	4-6-2	1842–1867	5' 6" gauge. 1842–51/55/56/58–64/66 to Pakistan at Partition; remainder to Eastern Punjab Railway, later all-India 22245–22250.
487–490	1930	4	Bombay, Baroda and Central India Railway	XC	4-6-2	613–616	5' 6" gauge. Later all-India 22241–22244.
491–492	1930	2	East India Railway	XC	4-6-2	1948–1949	5' 6" gauge. Later all-India 22201–22202.
493–494	1930	2	North Western Railway	DL	B-B (de)	30–31	5' 6" gauge. 350 hp (261 kW). Renumbered 330–331.

In concert with US and Canadian Westinghouse, diesel engines were developed and installed for railway self-propelled car use. Canadian National Railways had two articulated cars powered with Beardmore 320 hp engines, eight cars with 185 hp engines, and seven cars with 300 hp engines. Canadian National also purchased two locomotives, 9000–9001, built by Westinghouse and fitted with 1,330 hp engines. Several American railroads had self-propelled cars fitted with Westinghouse engines derived from Beardmore designs.

=== Aviation ===
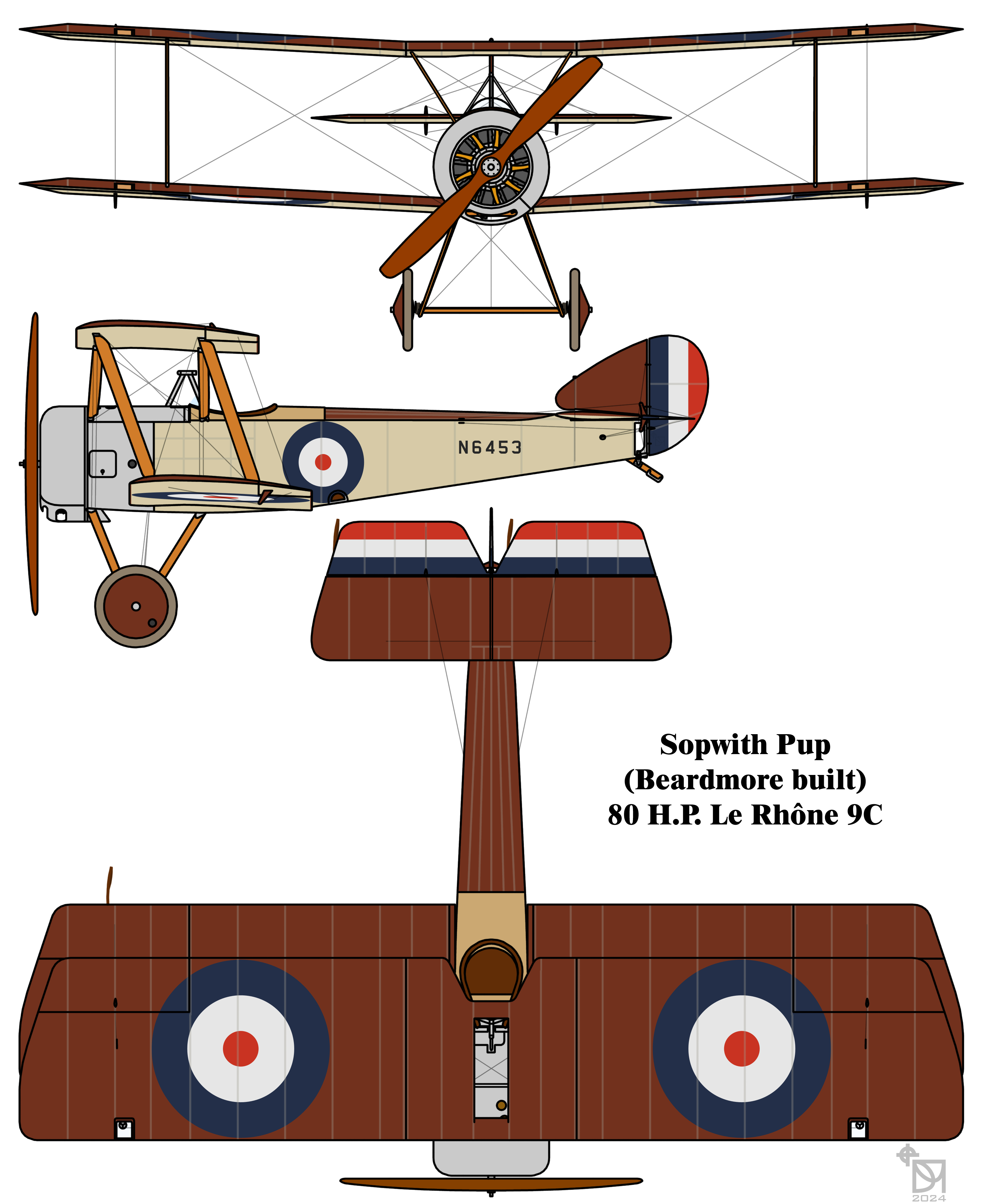
Beardmore-built Sopwith Pup the first aircraft to land on an aircraft carrier, in 1917.

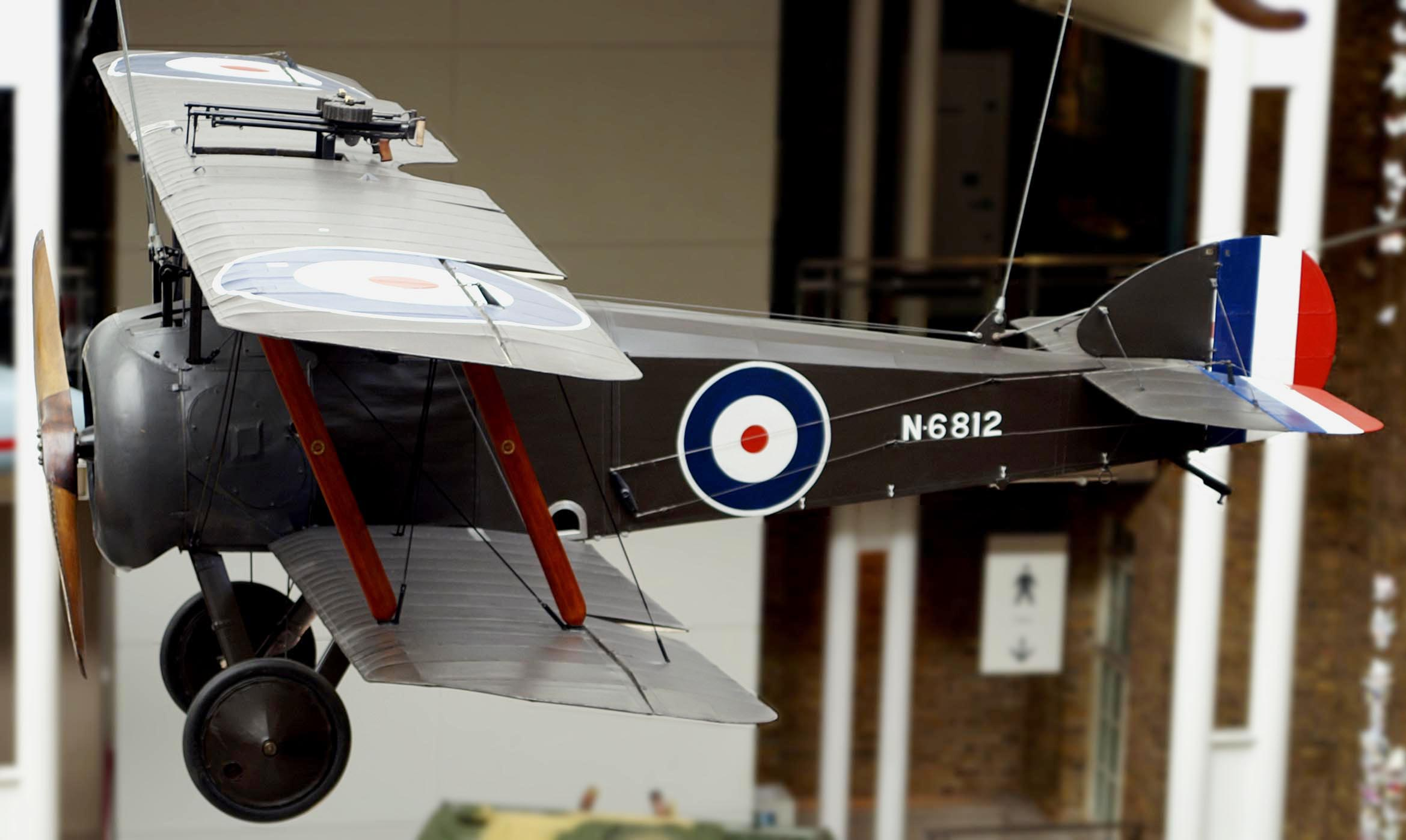
N6812, a preserved, Sopwith Camel, built under licence by Beardmore

The company first became involved in aviation in 1913, when it acquired British manufacturing rights for Austro-Daimler aero-engines and later those for D.F.W. aircraft.

It later built Sopwith Pup aircraft at Dalmuir under licence. Later, a shipborne version of the Pup, the Beardmore W.B.III, was designed by the company. A hundred of these aircraft were produced and delivered to the Royal Naval Air Service (RNAS). Beardmore also built 50 of the Nieuport 12 under licence, incorporating many of their own refinements however production was delayed sufficiently that by the time they entered service the aircraft were obsolete and were primarily relegated to training duties or placed into storage and never used.

The company built and ran the Inchinnan Airship Constructional Station at Inchinnan in Renfrewshire. It produced the airships R27, R32, R34 and R36.

In 1924, the company acquired a licence for stressed skin construction using the Rohrbach principles. An order for two flying boats using this construction idea was placed with Beardmore. It had the first aircraft built for it by the Rohrbach Metal Aeroplane Company in Copenhagen, building the second itself and they were delivered to the RAF as the Beardmore Inverness. In addition, a large, experimental, all-metal trimotor transport aircraft was designed and built at Dalmuir and delivered to the Royal Air Force as the Beardmore Inflexible. Beardmore produced a line of aircraft engines, including the Cyclone, Meteor, Simoon, Tornado (used in the R101 airship), Typhoon and Whirlwind.

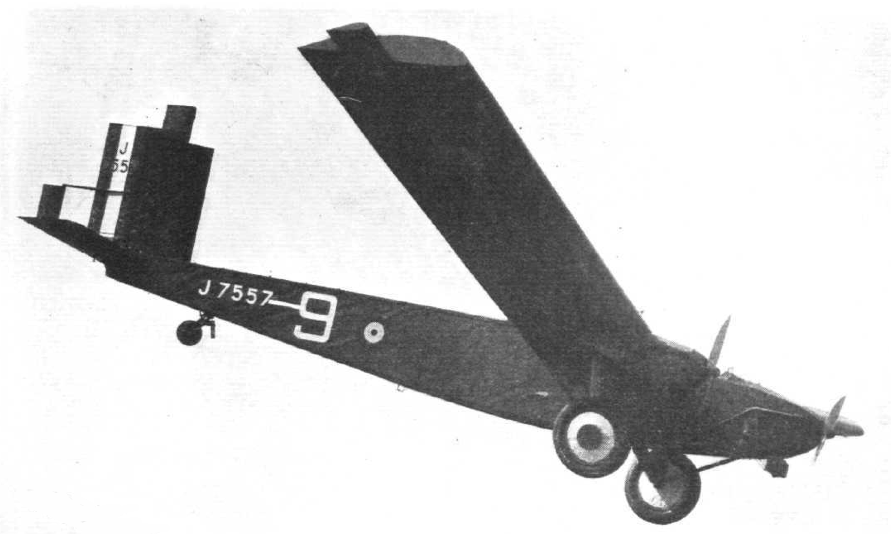
The Beardmore Inflexible at the Norwich Air Display, RAF Mousehold Heath, May 1929

==== Aircraft ====
===== Own designs =====
- Beardmore W.B.1
- Beardmore W.B.1a
- Beardmore W.B.II
- Beardmore W.B.III (most successful design)
- Beardmore W.B.IV
- Beardmore W.B.V
- Beardmore W.B.VI
- Beardmore W.B.XXIV Wee Bee
- Beardmore W.B.XXVI

===== Licensed designs =====
- Beardmore Inflexible (Rohrbach)
- Beardmore Inverness (Rohrbach Ro IV)
- Handley Page V/1500
- Nieuport 12
- Royal Aircraft Factory B.E.2C
- Sopwith Camel
- Sopwith Pup
- Wight Seaplane

===== Aircraft engines =====
- Beardmore 120 hp
- Beardmore 160 hp
- Beardmore Adriatic
- Beardmore Atlantic
- Beardmore Cyclone
- Beardmore Tornado

==== Airships ====
- R24r
- R27
- R32 (airship)
- R34 (airship)
- R36 (airship)

=== Road vehicles ===
In 1917, Beardmore bought Sentinel Waggon Works, a manufacturer of steam-powered railway locomotives, railcars and road vehicles. In 1919, a range of cars was announced, to be made by a subsidiary company, Beardmore Motors Ltd, based in factories in Glasgow and the surrounding area; Anniesland, Coatbridge and Paisley.

==== Cars and taxis ====
After the Great War, Beardmore manufactured cars and London-type taxis under their own name. The first car was the 1486cc, four-cylinder 11.4, which had a 4-cylinder overhead camshaft (OHC) engine. It was manufactured at Anniesland, Glasgow and introduced at Olympia in 1919. The shaft drive to the camshaft proved to be unreliable and it was replaced by a chain. The engine was increased in capacity to 1854 cc and the car, renamed as the 12/30 was introduced in June 1923. This new engine was used, in 1923 in the new Super Sports. It was priced at £750 and each car came with a certificate that guaranteed that it had been driven around Brooklands track at 70 mph (110 km/h). A highly modified version of the Super Sports, with a 2-litre engine broke the course record at the Shelsley Walsh hill climb in 1924.

Beardmore Mk7 Paramount Taxicab
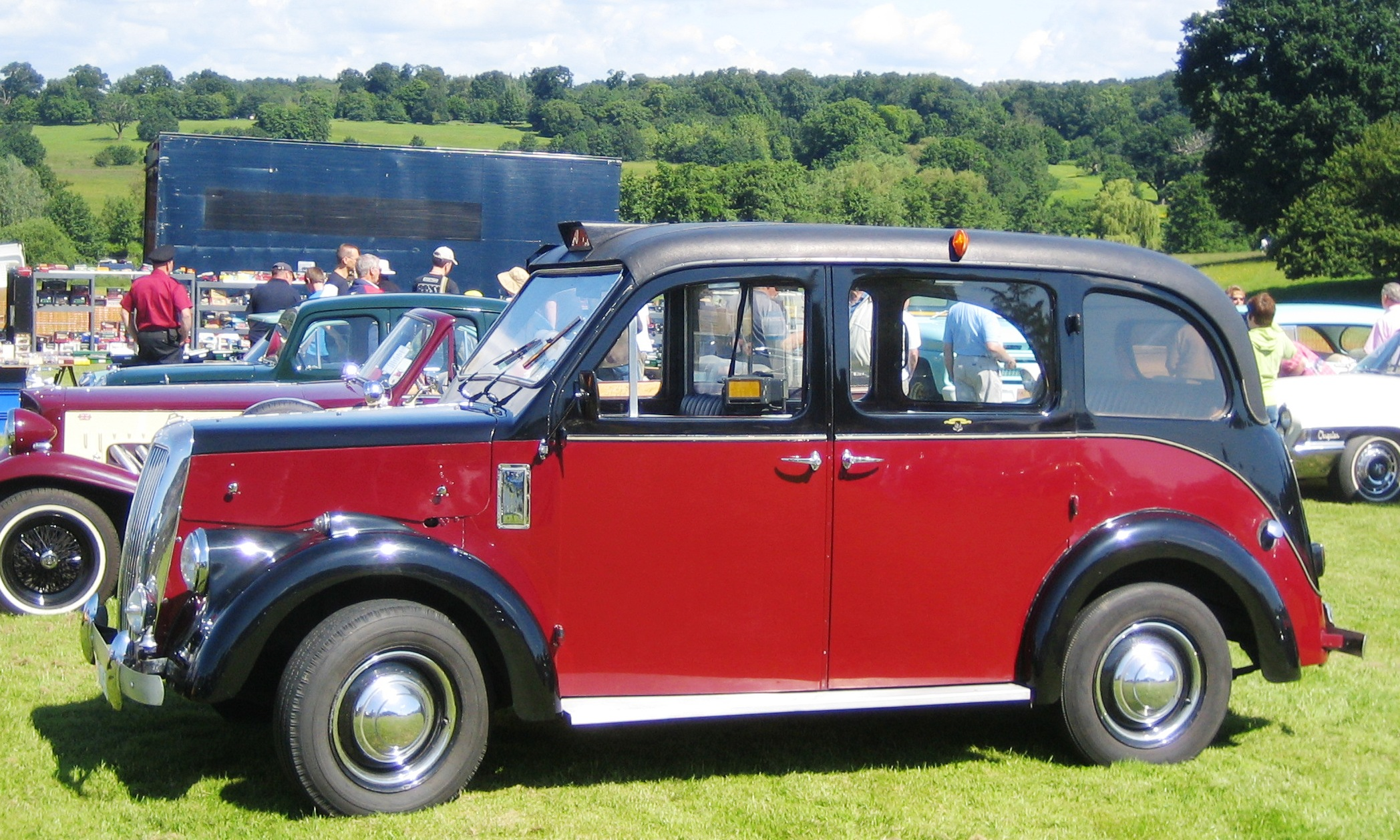
- Beardmore Mk7 Paramount taxi, 4-door model

Overview
- Manufacturer: Beardmore Motors
- Model years: 1954–66
- Assembly: Windovers Ltd. Hendon, North London; Weymann, Addlestone, Surrey; MCW, Washwood Heath, Birmingham, later Adderley Park, Birmingham

Body and chassis
- Body style: London taxi, fixed head
- Layout: Limousine

Powertrain
- Engine: Ford Consul (1508 cc or 1703 cc) or Zephyr 4 (1703 cc) 4-cylinder OHV petrol or Perkins 4-cylinder OHV diesel (99 cu in or 108 cu in)
- Transmission: Ford 3-speed or 4-speed manual

Dimensions
- Wheelbase: 8 ft 8 in (2.64 m)
- Length: 13 ft 10.5 in (4.229 m)
- Width: 5 ft 6 in (1.68 m)

Chronology
- Predecessor: Beardmore Mk6 taxi

Beardmore 12/30 Tourer, 1925
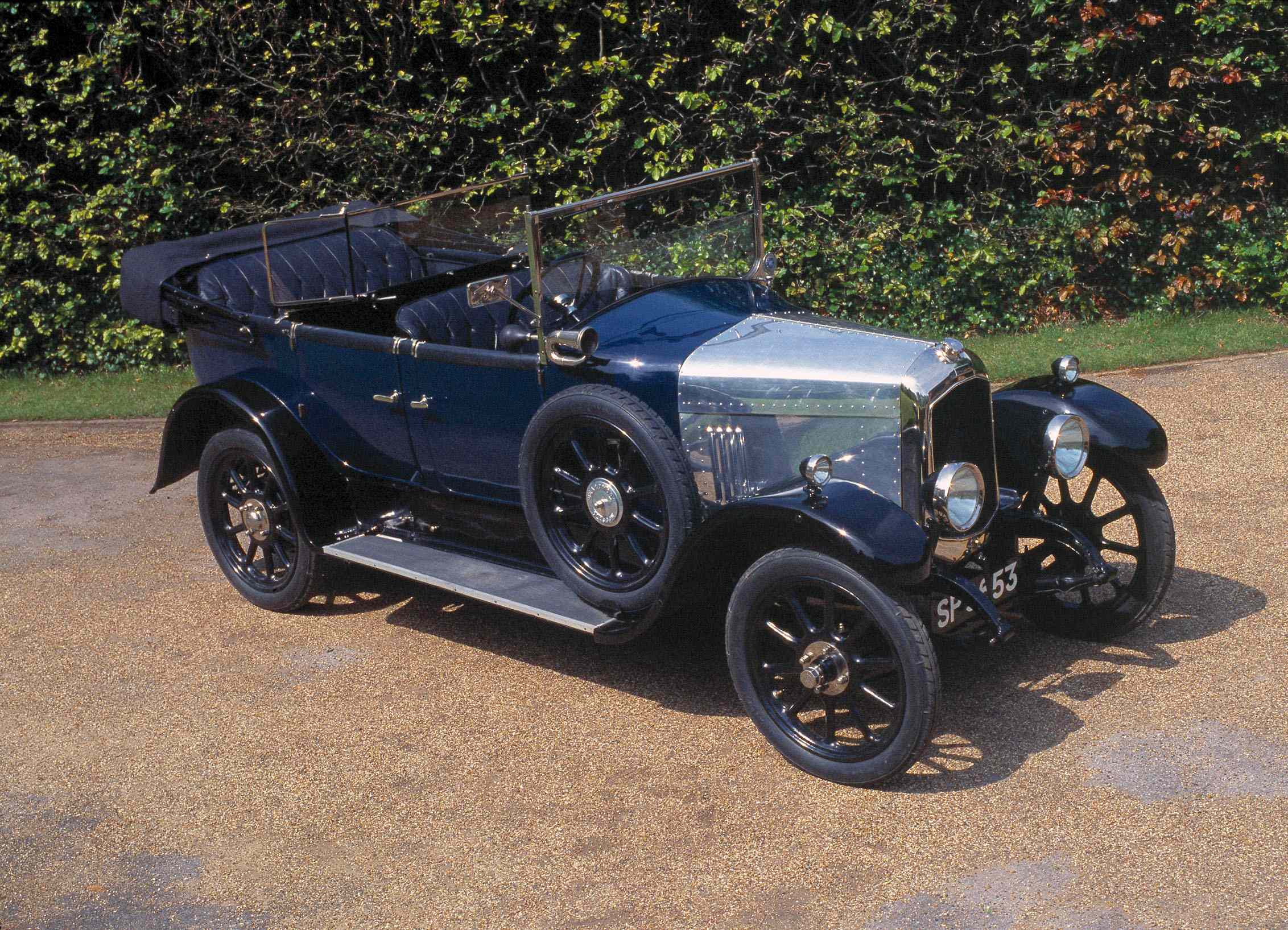
- Beardmore 12/30 Tourer, 1925

Overview
- Manufacturer: Beardmore Motors
- Model years: 1924–25
- Assembly: Anniesland, Glasgow

Powertrain
- Engine: Beardmore sohc 4-cylinder petrol, 1589 cc, 12HP
- Transmission: 4-speed manual

Chronology
- Predecessor: Beardmore 11 hp

The Anniesland factory was closed by 1925 and car production was moved to the taxi factory at Paisley, where a new model, the 14.40, with a sidevalve engine of 2297 cc with an aluminium cylinder head was introduced. The engine was increased to 2391 cc in 1925 and the car redesignated the 16.40. Two standard bodies were offered, the Stewart saloon and the Lomond limousine. A large car, the four cylinder 4072 cc Thirty was made at Coatbridge in 1920 but it was unsuccessful and was discontinued.

Production of the Beardmore Taxi began at Paisley in 1919 with what became known retrospectively as the Mk1. This was designed to meet the Metropolitan Police Conditions of Fitness for London Taxis. It was a very tough and reliable vehicle and it earned itself the name of 'The Rolls-Royce of taxicabs'. A car version, the Country and Colonial model was also made, as was a light van. It was replaced in 1923 by the Mk2, which had an all-new chassis, which it shared with a new range of light trucks and buses. Following a change in the Conditions of Fitness, Beardmore introduced a new model, the Mk3 'Hyper'. This had a smaller, 2-litre sidevalve engine and was lighter and more economical to run.

Following the removal of William Beardmore from the board of his company in 1929, Beardmore Motors was bought out by its directors, and taxi production was moved from Scotland to Hendon, North London. Here in 1932 a new model, the Mk4 Paramount was introduced, which was essentially an updated Mk3 with a 2-litre Commer engine and gearbox. In 1935, the Mk5 Paramount Ace, with a new, longer wheelbase chassis was introduced, with the same engine. It was followed in 1938 by the Mk6 Ace, which had detail refinements. The 1930s Beardmore became known as the 'greengrocer's barrow', because 'all the best things were in front'!

After the Second World War, Beardmore Motors sold and serviced the new Nuffield Oxford cab, until the newly formed British Motor Corporation axed it in favour of their own Austin FX3. Beardmore Motors then returned to making their own cabs. The model they introduced, in 1954 was the Mk7 Paramount, which had a traditional style coachbuilt body, of aluminium panels over an ash frame, built by Windover. The engine was from a Mk1 Ford Consul, (later, a Mk2 Consul and finally a Ford Zephyr 4) but a Perkins 4.99 diesel was offered from 1956. In the same year, body production was taken over by Weymann at Addlestone. Production of the entire cab was soon moved there. In 1966, when Metropolitan-Cammell bought Weymann, taxi production was moved to MCW's factory at Washwood Heath, Birmingham, where it ended in late 1966. Final production of the Mk7 amounted to just over 650 cabs.

==== Motorcycles ====
Between 1921 and 1924, Beardmore took over building the Precision range of motorcycles that had been developed by Frank Baker, selling them as "Beardmore Precision". Engine sizes ranged from 250 cc to 600 cc. They also supplied the engines to several cyclecar manufacturers. After Beardmore stopped manufacture, Baker set up his own company again and restarted production.

==== Diesel engines ====
Although heavy oil engines had been built from the early years of the century for power-generation purposes, a range of automotive diesels was under development at the time of the financial crisis; the Bank of England commissioned consulting engineer Harry Ricardo to assess these and he gave a mostly favourable report, the largest customer for the Dalmuir-built Beardmore Engine was Glasgow Corporation who took 30 6-cylinder 90 bhp engines in Albion Venturer M81 chassis during 1934, but reliability was so poor that by five years later all had been replaced by Leyland 8.6 litre units.

== Decline and demise ==
Beardmore's various companies became unprofitable in the post-WW1 slump, resulting in the company facing bankruptcy. Financial aid again came from Vickers Limited, which took a 60 per cent stake in Beardmores, before pulling out in the late 1920s. Beardmore himself was removed from executive control of his company by the Bank of England. Most of Beardmore's various businesses were wound down over the next few years until Beardmore's retirement and death in 1936, although some persisted.

=== Dalmuir Shipyard ===
The crisis in the British shipbuilding industry after the First World War resulted in the formation of a company with the purpose of taking control of and eliminating loss-making shipyards to reduce capacity and competition; National Shipbuilders Securities Ltd, under Sir James Lithgow of shipbuilding giant Lithgows, Limited. The former bought Beardmore's Dalmuir yard in 1930 and the yard was closed and its facilities dismantled, although various maritime engineering works persisted on the site until 1936. The Dalmuir site was re-established as ROF Dalmuir in 1939; however, and was later sold to Babcock & Wilcox in 1957 to supplement their main factory in Renfrew during a peak in power station building in the 1960s, who continued to operate there until returning all manufacturing to their Renfrew Works in 1969. During the 1970s, the site was converted into the Clydebank Industrial Estate and in recent years has also formed the location of the Golden Jubilee Hospital and the Beardmore Hotel.

=== Parkhead Forge ===
Sir James Lithgow purchased Beardmore debentures from the Bank of England on favourable terms in 1934, taking control of Beardmore's iron and steel assets including – the former centrepiece of the Beardmore empire – the Parkhead Forge. It was at Parkhead Forge that James spotted young engineering manager Ian MacGregor who scabbed during a strike by driving a crane himself for two weeks. James accelerated his career and MacGregor went on himself to be a major industrial figure.

After Parkhead Forge was nationalised by the Iron and Steel Corporation of Great Britain between 1951 and 1954, it was acquired by Sheffield-based Firth Brown Steels in 1957, before the Forge was finally closed in 1983, with Firth Brown consolidating its operations in Sheffield. The land later became The Forge Shopping Centre, which opened in 1988.

== Archives ==
The archives of William Beardmore and Company are maintained by the Archives of the University of Glasgow (GUAS).

== See also ==
- Beardmore Precision Motorcycles
- Arthur MacManus and David Kirkwood, notable Scottish socialists and trade unionists active in the Beardmore workforce.
- Timeline of hydrogen technologies

== Bibliography ==
- Boddy, M. G.; Brown, W. A.; Fry, E. V.; Hennigan, W.; Hoole, Ken; Manners, F.; Neve, E.; Platt, E. N. T.; Proud, P.; Yeadon, W. B. (March 1975). Fry, E. V. (ed.). Locomotives of the L.N.E.R., Part 2B: Tender Engines—Classes B1 to B19. Lincoln: RCTS. ISBN 0-901115-73-8.
- Georgano, Nick (1972). A History of the London Taxi. David and Charles. ISBN 0-7153-5687-9.
- Hughes, Hugh (1979). Steam locomotives in India: Part 3 – Broad Gauge. The Continental Railway Circle. ISBN 0-9503469-4-2.
- Hughes, Hugh (1990). Indian Locomotives: Part 1 – Broad Gauge 1853–1940. The Continental Railway Circle. ISBN 0-9503469-8-5.
- Hughes, Hugh (1992). Indian Locomotives: Part 2 – Metre Gauge 1872–1940. The Continental Railway Circle. ISBN 0-9503469-9-3.
- Hughes, Hugh (1996). Indian Locomotives: Part 4 – 1941–1990. The Continental Railway Circle. ISBN 0-9521655-1-1.
- Hume, John R; Moss, Michael S (1979). Beardmore: the History of a Scottish Industrial Giant. Heinemann. ISBN 0-435-32589-2.
- Hurst, K. A. (2003). William Beardmore: Transport is the Thing. NMSE Publishing. ISBN 1-901663-53-1.
- Johnston, Ian (1993). Beardmore Built: The Rise and Fall of a Clydeside Shipyard. Clydebank District Libraries & Museums Department. ISBN 0-906938-05-8.
- MacKay, Charles (2012). Beardmore Aviation 1913–1930. A.MacKay. ISBN 978-0-9573443-0-3.
- May, C.A.N. Shelsey Walsh G T Foulis.
- Munro, Bill (2011). London Taxis: a Full History. Earlswood Press. ISBN 978-0-9562308-2-9.
- Rowledge, JWP (1975). Engines of the LMS built 1923–51. Oxford Publishing Company. ISBN 0-902888-59-5.
- Thomas, R.D; Patterson, B (1998). Dreadnoughts in Camera 1905–1920. Sutton Publishing.
