= Beardmore Cyclone =

1920s British aircraft piston engine

Cyclone
- Type: Inline piston engine
- National origin: United Kingdom
- Manufacturer: William Beardmore and Company
- First run: 1922

The Beardmore Cyclone was an aero engine produced by William Beardmore & Co with the aim of producing an engine generating a high power output at low revolutions by designing an engine of large displacement. The design did not enter volume production.

== Design and development ==
The Cyclone was an upright inline six-cylinder water-cooled engine with a bore of 8.625 in (219.1 mm) and stroke of 12 in (300 mm) stroke, giving a displacement of 4,207 cu in (68,940 cm^{3}). It had a combined crankcase and cylinder block made of aluminium with steel cylinder liners and aluminium pistons. Each cylinder had its own detachable head, with two spark plugs and four valves operated by push-rods driven by a single camshaft. The compression ratio was 5.25 to 1.

The Cyclone was first run in 1922, producing 700 hp (522 kW) at 1,220 rpm. Further development increased output to 850 hp (634 kW) at 1,350 rpm but could produce 950 hp (708 kW) at the same rpm with a larger carburettor.

== Variants ==
The Beardmore Typhoon was an inverted version of the Cyclone, with almost all parts being interchangeable between the two engines. It was test flown in Avro Aldershot J6852 in January 1927.

A compression ignition version of the Typhoon was projected and was the original choice of power-plant for the R101 airship, but this version proved impractical.

== Specifications ==
Data from Flight, 4 November 1926. p. 717.

=== General characteristics ===
- Type: 6-cylinder liquid-cooled inline upright layout engine
- Bore: 8.625 in (219.1 mm)
- Stroke: 12 in (300 mm)
- Displacement: 4,207 cu in (68,940 cm^{3})
- Length: 80.3 in (2,040 mm)
- Width: 35 in (890 mm)
- Height: 61.125 in (1,552.6 mm)
- Dry weight: 2,150 lb (980 kg)

=== Components ===
- Valvetrain: four pushrod-actuated valves per cylinder
- Cooling system: Water cooling

=== Performance ===
- Power output: 950 hp (710 kW) at 1,350 rpm
- Compression ratio: 5.25:1
- Specific fuel consumption: 0.48 lb/(hp⋅h) (0.29 kg/kWh)
- Oil consumption: 0.1 lb/(hp⋅h) (0.061 kg/kWh)

== See also ==
Related lists

- List of aircraft engines
