= Beardmore W.B.XXVI =

W.B.XXVI
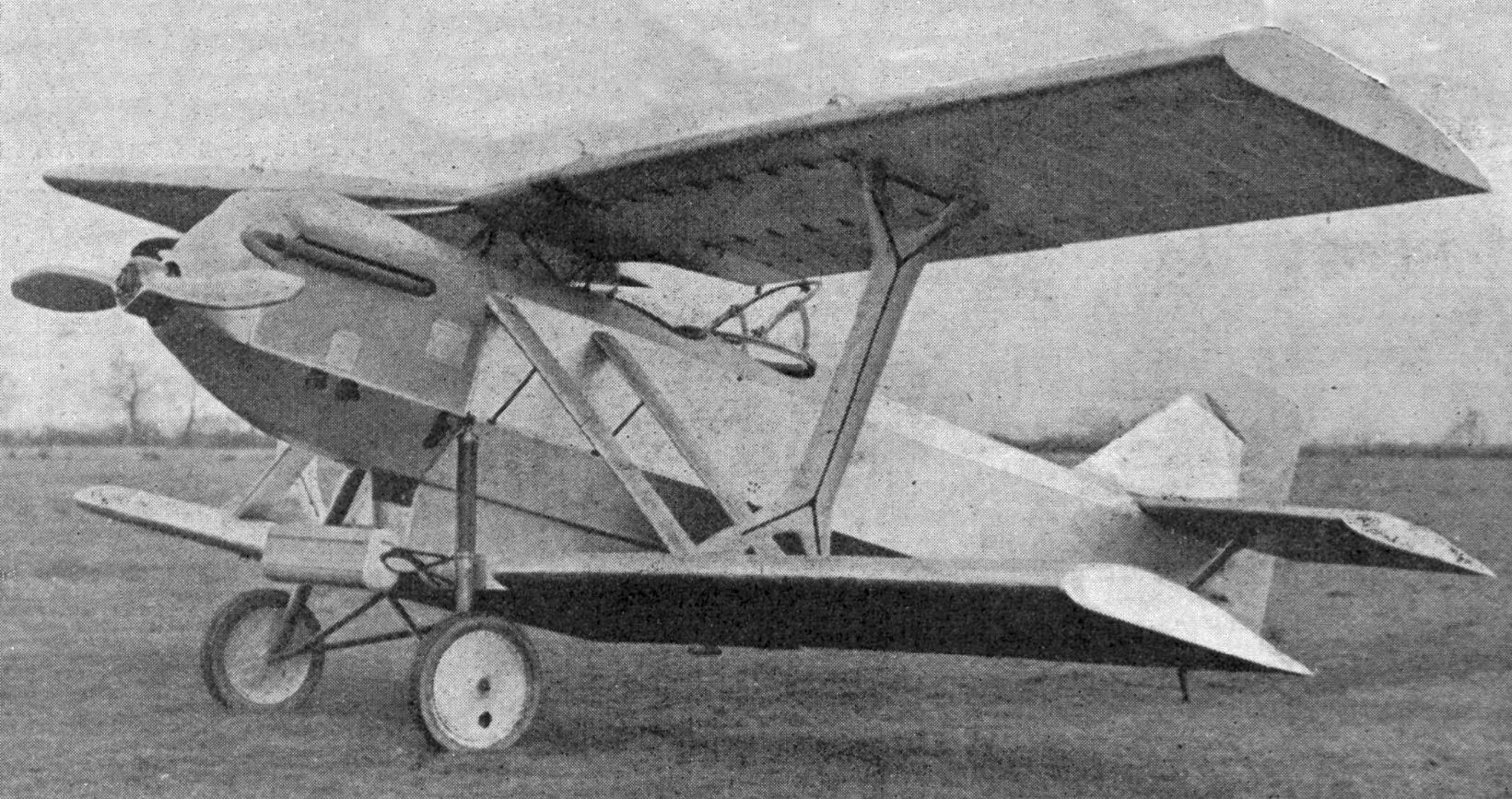

General information
- Type: Fighter aircraft
- National origin: United Kingdom
- Manufacturer: William Beardmore and Company
- Designer: W.S. Shackleton
- Status: Prototype
- Number built: 1

History
- First flight: 1925

The Beardmore W.B.XXVI (W.B.26) was a prototype British two-seat fighter of the 1920s. A single engined biplane, one example was built and evaluated by Latvia, but was not accepted for service.

== Development and design ==
In 1924, the Scottish shipbuilding company of William Beardmore and Company designed a two-seat fighter for Latvia, the W.B.XXVI. Beardmore's chief designer, W.S. Shackleton produced a wooden single-bay biplane, powered by a Rolls-Royce Eagle engine. The slab-sided fuselage was of hexagonal section, with the crew of two seated in separate cockpits. To reduce drag, the wings had no bracing wires, bracing being solely by means of struts, with a large inter-wing gap. A Lamblin radiator was installed in the leading edge of the lower wing. Instead of the normal Vickers and Lewis machine guns, the aircraft was armed by Beardmore's own gas-operated Beardmore-Farquhar machine guns.

The prototype first flew some time in 1925. While it proved to be manoeuvrable, it was underpowered, and performance was poor, with the Latvians unwilling to pay for replacement of the Eagle with a more powerful Napier Lion engine. It was sent to Latvia for evaluation in 1926, but was only flown three times in Latvia before it was rejected, and was eventually sent back to Beardmore and scrapped. No more W.B.XXVIs were built.

== Specifications ==
Data from Limited Editions Part 4: Beardmore W.B.XXVI

General characteristics

- Crew: 2
- Length: 27 ft 10 1/2 in (8.50 m)
- Wingspan: 37 ft 0 in (11.28 m)
- Wing area: 356 sq ft (33.1 m^{2})
- Empty weight: 2,555 lb (1,159 kg)
- Gross weight: 3,980 lb (1,805 kg)
- Powerplant: 1 × Rolls-Royce Eagle IX V-12 water-cooled piston engine, 360 hp (270 kW)
- Propellers: 2-bladed fixed-pitch propeller

Performance

- Maximum speed: 145 mph (233 km/h, 126 kn)
- Endurance: 4 hours
- Service ceiling: 20,000 ft (6,100 m)
- Time to altitude: 15,000 ft (4,572 m) in 20 minutes
- Wing loading: 11.2 lb/sq ft (55 kg/m^{2})
- Power/mass: 0.09 hp/lb (0.15 kW/kg)

Armament

- Guns:

- 2× fixed forward firing Beardmore-Farquhar machine guns
- 1 or 2 flexibly-mounted Beardmore-Farquhar machine guns on a Scarff ring
