= Martin Ebon =

Martin Ebon (May 27, 1917 – February 11, 2006) was the pen-name of Hans Martin Schwarz, an American journalist and author of non-fiction books and articles from the paranormal to politics, particularly as an anti-communist.

== Background ==
Hans Martin Schwarz was born on May 27, 1917, in Hamburg, Germany.

== Career ==
During the 1930s, Schwarz published in Israelitisches Familienblatt among other German-Jewish periodicals.

In 1938, Schwarz emigrated to the US, lived in New York City from 1938 onwards, and changed his name from Hans Martin Schwartz to Martin Ebon.

During World War II, he served in the U.S. Office of War Information (formed June 1942), the U.S. Department of State (as an information officer), and by 1948 had joined the staff of Partisan Review magazine.

In January 1948, Ebon published his first book in English, World Communism Today. The book reviewed a century of Marxism, following the publication of the Communist Manifesto by Karl Marx and Friedrich Engels in 1848. Arthur M. Schlesinger Jr. praised the book as an "outstanding work on communist penetration and strategy." The book was cited as an expert source, e.g., 60,000 members in the Korean Communist Party as of 1949. In March 1948, he appeared on WMAL AM radio in Washington, DC, to discuss "Which Way America – Fascism, Communism, Socialism, or Democracy?" with Raymond Moley (Conservative), Norman Thomas (Socialist), and Leon Milton Birkhead (Unitarian). His July 1948 article "Communist Tactics in Palestine" in the Middle East Journal received a favorably review as "carefully documented" and "objective and non-partisan." In 1953, his book Malenkov: Stalin's Successor received mixed reviews as "short," quickly published (weeks after Stalin's death), and carefully appraising thanks to the author's previous book on world communism. It drew favorable comparison to Eugene Lyons' Our Secret Allies.

Ebon held various positions in book and magazine retailing, including:

- Managing Editor of foreign language division, Overseas News Agency; U.S. Information Agency, New York City
- Information Officer on Far Eastern desks, 1950–52; Hill & Knowlton, Inc. (public relations), New York City
- Account Executive, 1952–53; Parapsychology Foundation, Inc., New York City, administrative secretary and editor, 1953–65, working closely with its founder, Eileen J. Garrett
- Lombard Associates, Inc. (public relations and publications consultants), New York City, president, 1962–82
- Consulting Editor, New American Library (publishers), 1966–83
- Executive Editor of hardcover book division, Playboy Press, 1971–72
- Lecturer in Division of Social Sciences, The New School, 1949–50, 1955–56, 1967
- Consultant, Foundation for Research on the Nature of Man, 1966–67
- Free-lance writer from 1967 on

== Personal life and death ==
Ebon married Chariklia Baltazzi; they had one son.

Martin Ebon died age 82 on February 11, 2006, in Las Vegas, Nevada.

== Legacy ==
The Center for Jewish History houses articles written by Ebon between 1934 and 1938 for German-Jewish newspapers, plus reviews of his German-language books.

== Works ==
Ebon published dozens of books on world affairs and parapsychology.

Books in German

- Einer wie Du und Ich (1937)
- Heiteres, Besinnliches, Nachdenkliches (1937)

Books in English

- World Communism Today (1948)
- Malenkov: Stalin's Successor, McGraw-Hill, 1953
- Svetlana: The Story of Stalin's Daughter, New American Library, 1967
- Prophecy in Our Time, New American Library, 1968.
- The Making of a Legend, Universe Books, 1969.
- Lin Pao: The Life and Writings of China's New Ruler, Stein & Day.
- Witchcraft Today, New American Library, 1971.
- Every Woman's Guide to Abortion, Universe Books, 1971.
- They Knew the Unknown, World Publishing, 1971.
- The Truth about Vitamin E, Bantam, 1972.
- The Devil's Bride: Exorcism, Past and Present, Harper, 1974.
- The Essential Vitamin Counter, Bantam, 1974.
- Which Vitamins Do You Need?, Bantam, 1974.
- Saint Nicholas.- Life and Legend, Harper, 1975.
- The Satan Trap: Dangers of the Occult, Doubleday, 1976.
- What's New in ESP?, Pyramid, 1976.
- The Relaxation Controversy, New American Library, 1976.
- The Evidence for Life after Death, New American Library, 1977.
- Miracles, Signet, 1981.
- Psychic Warfare: Threat or Illusion, McGraw-Hill, 1983.
- The Andropov File, McGraw-Hill, 1983.
- Nikita Khrushchev, Chelsea House, 1986.
- The Soviet Propaganda Machine, McGraw-Hill, 1987.
- KGB: Death and Rebirth, Greenwood/Praeger, 1994

Books as "Eric Ward"

- The President's Daughter with Ursala Russell, Bantam, 1973

Articles

- "World Communism Has Passed Its Peak," American Mercury (January 1948)
- "Communist Tactics in Palestine," Middle East Journal (July 1948)
- "Psychic Studies: The Soviet Dilemma," Skeptical Inquirer (1985)

Miscellaneous

- Letter to Joshua Lederberg (15 November 1985)
