= George Herbert Scott =

British airship pilot and engineer

Herbert Scott
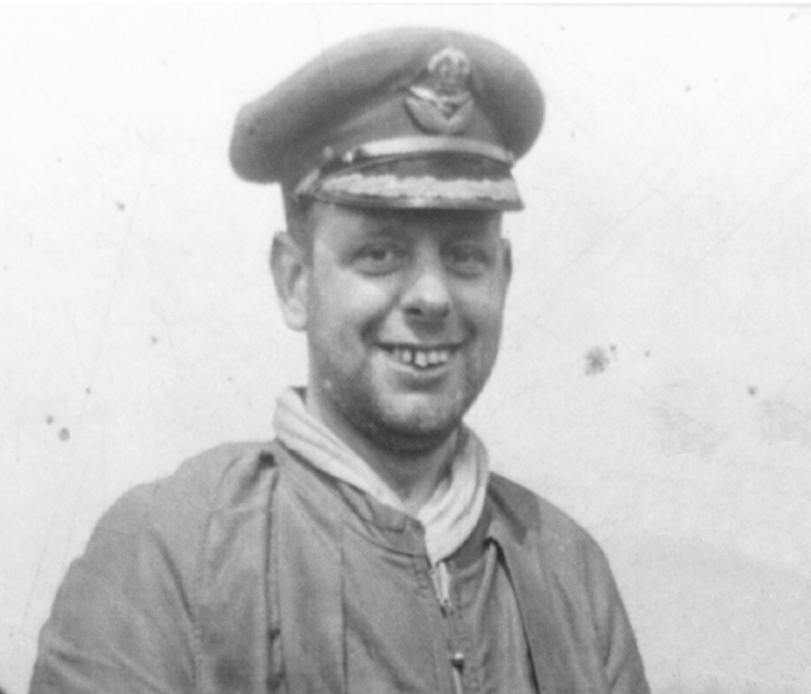
- Scott in 1919
- Born: George Herbert Scott; 25 May 1888; Lewisham, London
- Died: 5 October 1930 (aged 42); Beauvais, France
- Cause of death: crash of R101
- Resting place: St Mary's church, Cardington, United Kingdom
- Other names: "Lucky, "Lucky Breeze", "Daredevil Lucky"
- Known for: First transatlantic airship flight; first east-west transatlantic flight; development of high mooring mast
- Spouse: Jessie Campbell
- Awards: AFC, CBE
- Aviation career
- Air force: RNAS, RAF
- Battles: First World War

Major George Herbert "Lucky Breeze" Scott, CBE, AFC, (25 May 1888 – 5 October 1930) was a British airship pilot and engineer. After serving in the Royal Naval Air Service and Royal Air Force during World War I, Scott went on to command the airship R34 on its return Atlantic crossing in 1919, which marked the first transatlantic flight by an airship and the first east–west transatlantic flight by an aircraft of any kind. Subsequently, he worked at the Royal Airship Works in connection with the Imperial Airship Scheme and took part in a second return Atlantic crossing, this time by the R100, in 1930. He was killed later in the year (along with 47 other people) aboard the R100's near-sister, the R101, when it crashed in northern France during a flight to India.

In addition to his achievements as an aviator, Scott made significant contributions to airship engineering, notably in the evolution of the mooring mast.

== Background and early life ==
Scott was born in Lewisham, London, on 25 May 1888, the eldest son of civil engineer George Hall Scott and his wife, Margaret Wilkinson. He attended Alton School in Plymouth; Richmond School, Yorkshire; and the Royal Naval Engineering College, then located at Keyham, Plymouth. From 1908 onwards, Scott was "engaged in general engineering"; immediately before World War I, he worked on the construction of naval vessels at the Sociedad Española de Construcción Naval in Ferrol, Spain.

== Military service ==
Scott joined the Royal Naval Air Service (RNAS) in 1914 as a Flight Sub-Lieutenant and trained at Farnborough in Hampshire and RNAS Kingsnorth in Kent. Between May 1915 and October 1916, he was based at Barrow-in-Furness. His first command was No. 4, a non-rigid airship built in 1913 to the designs of August von Parseval and based in Barrow by 1915. In the first of a number of landing accidents involving Scott, he was in command of No. 4 when (with Barnes Wallis aboard) it struck its shed at Barrow in foggy conditions in November 1915. (In fairness to Scott, one source attributes the collision to his efforts to avoid an "enormous bonfire" that had been lit in a misguided attempt to "assist [the crew] in finding their bearings".)

Subsequently, Scott took command of the Anglesey station, before returning to Barrow in March 1917. In April 1917, he was posted to RNAS Howden, Yorkshire, as captain of HM Airship No. 9r, the first British rigid airship to fly. He went on to command the same ship at Cranwell, Lincolnshire, and Pulham, Norfolk. On the formation of the RAF in April 1918, he was gazetted to the rank of Major.

== R34's transatlantic flight ==
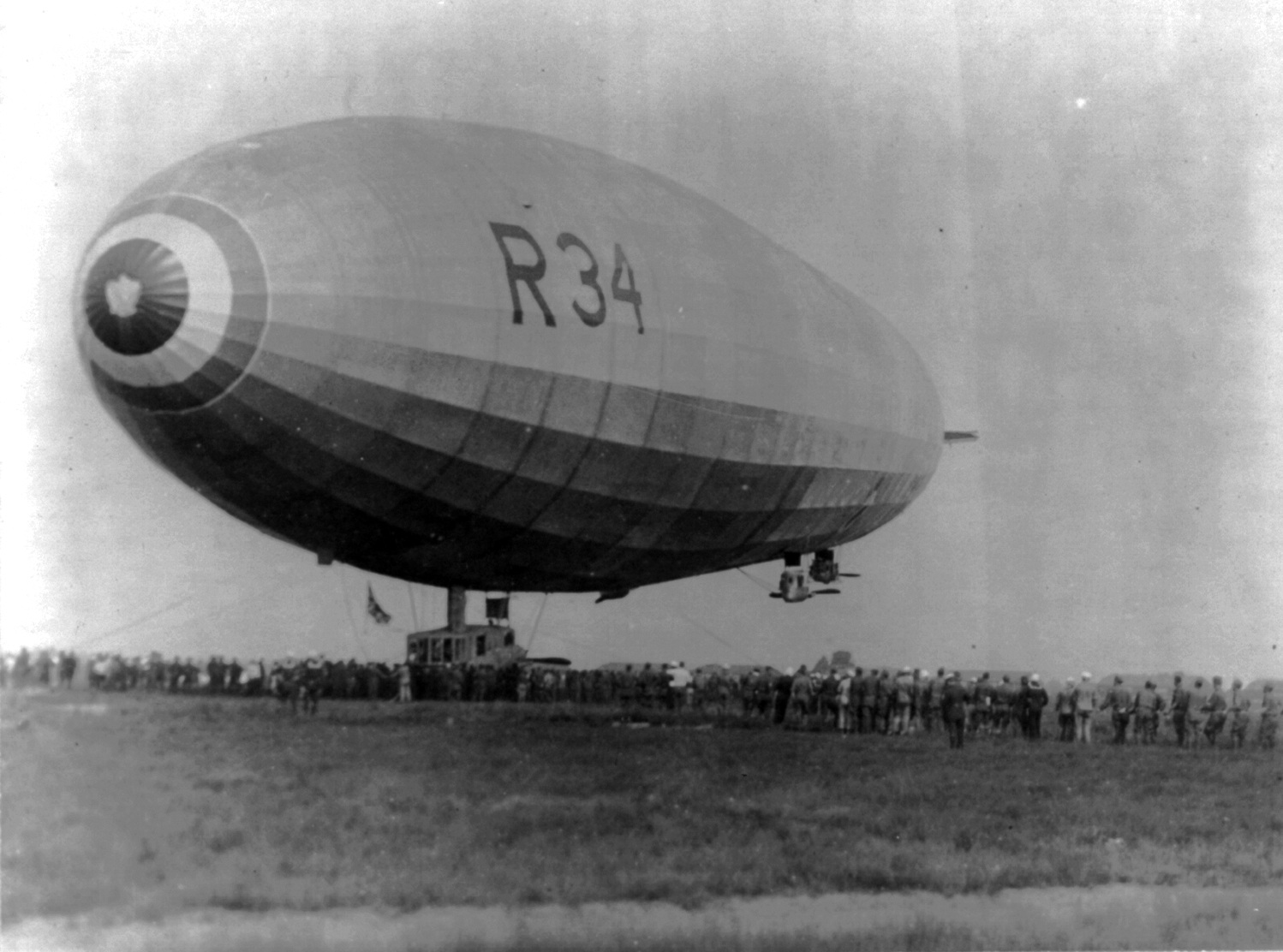
R34 lands at Mineola, 6 July 1919

Scott took charge of the new rigid R34, built by William Beardmore and Company at Inchinnan, Renfrewshire, Scotland, on its completion in 1919 and was ordered to "prepare for a voyage to the United States of America". Damage to the airship during a trial flight forced a delay in departure, meaning that Alcock and Brown beat the R34 to the distinction of making the first non-stop transatlantic flight.

The R34 eventually set out from its base at East Fortune, Scotland, in the early hours of 2 July 1919. Despite "dodging storms and fogs" and running low on both fuel and hydrogen, it landed at Mineola, New York, on 6 July, after 108 hours and 12 minutes of flying time. The return trip began late on 10 July and ended at Pulham on 13 July, having taken 75 hours and 3 minutes. Scott received the CBE in honour of his role in the flight.

== Royal Airship Works ==
Scott retired from the RAF in October 1919, subsequently joining the technical staff of the Royal Airship Works at Cardington, Bedfordshire, in 1920. Although British airship development "initially began to languish" in peacetime, Scott was a member of the "nucleus staff" retained until development was resumed under the auspices of the Imperial Airship Scheme from 1924.

During this period, Scott took part in the trials of the new passenger airship R36. On a 5 April 1921 demonstration flight, the R36 suffered a failure of the top rudder and starboard elevator during a turning test, which "caused the ship to fall rapidly for about 3,000 feet (910 m) [and attain] a severe nose down angle". However, thanks to Scott's decision to conduct the tests at altitude, he was able to "trim [the R36] and...bring her safely to earth" by moving crew members about within the hull.

Scott was also involved in the R36's high-profile 14 June 1921 flight over the Ascot Races, with journalists and Metropolitan Police representatives aboard, to assess the airship's potential role in road-traffic control. However, just a week after the Ascot flight, the R36's career was ended by severe damage to its bows resulting from a landing accident at Pulham. After taking over command from the ship's captain, Flight Lieutenant Herbert Irwin (later captain of the R101), Scott conducted an excessively rapid approach to the mast.

During the same period, Scott also served as a member of the Air Ministry committee that investigated the loss in 1921 of the R38.

=== The Imperial Airship Scheme ===
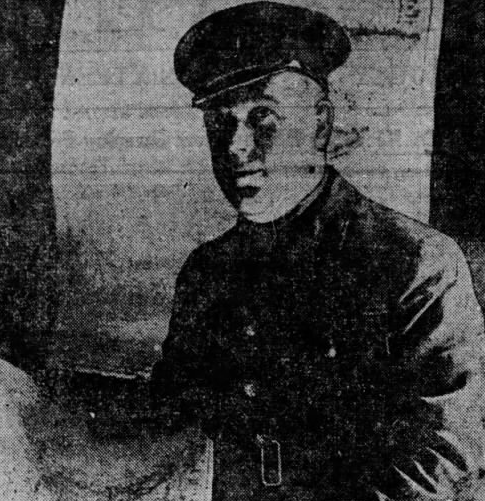
George Herbert Scott commanding R34

Proposals for an airship network connecting Britain with its colonies and dominions worldwide emerged in the years following the R34's transatlantic flight, although political and economic difficulties slowed their progress. The Imperial Airship Scheme, providing for the construction of two competing prototype passenger airships (R100, built by the Vickers-controlled Airship Guarantee Company at Howden, and R101, built by the state-owned Royal Airship Works at Cardington), was instigated in 1924. In the same year, Scott assumed the position of Officer in Charge of Flying and Training in the Air Ministry's Airship Directorate. (His title became Assistant Director of Airship Development (Flying) in January 1930.)

The R34's sister ship, R33, was employed on test flights to provide data for the design of the new ships; it was commanded by Flight Lieutenant Irwin, former captain of the R36 and later to command the R101. On the night of 16–17 April 1925, the R33 broke from the Pulham mast during a gale and was blown stern-first to the Netherlands before those aboard—led by the first officer, Flight Lieutenant Ralph Booth, who would later command the R100—could regain control. Following the incident, Booth praised the "valuable guidance" that Scott had provided via radio. Scott was involved more directly in a second incident with the R33, this time on its final flight in November 1925, when the ship hit the shed doors at Pulham while under his control.

==== Scott's position aboard the R100 and R101 ====
The R100 and R101 were finally launched in late 1929. Scott did not himself command either airship (the R100 being commanded by Ralph Booth, who had by now been promoted to Wing Commander, and the R101 by Flight Lieutenant Irwin) but took an active part in both ships' test flights.

At a meeting of an Air Ministry committee held on 27 July 1930, shortly before the R100 left for Canada, the issues of Scott's "lack of recent experience of airship handling" and the difficulties potentially arising if there was "any division of responsibility" between Scott and the ship's captain were discussed. The Air Member for Supply and Research, Sir John Higgins, ruled that captains should have "full responsibility" and that Scott would give no orders to any crew member apart from the captain; moreover, the captain was not bound to take Scott's advice. Higgins described Scott's position as that of "a non-executive Admiral."

Shortly before his death aboard the R101 in 1930, Scott told Flight magazine that, on the R100 and R101's intercontinental flights, he was "officer in command of the flight" and decided "all such points as when the ship would sail, her course, her speed, her altitude." The airships' own captains were "in charge of the crew and discipline." In his book on the R101, The Millionth Chance, James Leasor echoed Higgins's description, likening Scott's position to that of "an Admiral in his flagship", with Irwin being "the flagship captain and responsible for [crew] discipline."

==== Second Atlantic crossing ====
In his capacity as "admiral", Scott flew from Cardington to Montreal and back aboard the R100 in mid-1930. The ship left Cardington in the early hours of 29 July and, despite some encounters with stormy conditions that caused damage to its tail fins (and would later cause some commentators to question Scott's judgement), arrived in Montreal early on 1 August, after 78 hours and 49 minutes of flying time. During its stay in Canada, the R100 made a flight of 25 hours and 57 minutes duration over Quebec and southern Ontario. The return flight set out on the evening of 13 August and arrived in Cardington on the morning of 16 August after 57 hours and 56 minutes of flying time; the trip was generally uneventful.

== Technical contributions ==
In the immediate post–World War I years, Scott occupied the post of Chief Experimental Officer at Pulham. He conducted research on airship mooring, and the first high mast in Europe, 120 feet (37 m) high, was constructed at the site. The mast, which was erected in July 1919, was initially tested using the obsolescent rigid airship R24, which remained moored for periods of three to six weeks at a time. The R33 and R36 later used the Pulham mast, and the R100 and R101 used high masts (at Cardington and, in the R100's case, Saint-Hubert, Quebec, near Montreal) throughout their short lives. (The system was also adopted by the US Navy for the Shenandoah and Los Angeles but eventually abandoned in favour of shorter "stub" masts.) Scott was granted a number of patents relating to the mooring system.

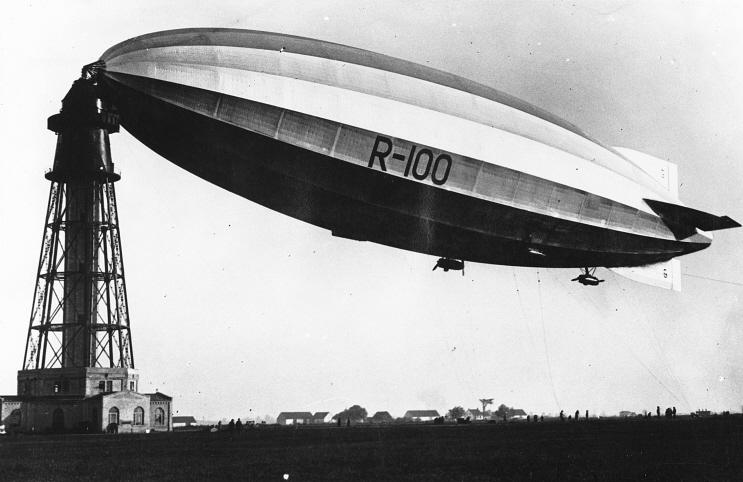
R100 moored to a high mast at Saint-Hubert, Quebec, 1930.

Scott also contributed to the design of airships themselves; with R101 designer Colonel Vincent Richmond, he was responsible for that ship's novel unbraced transverse frames. In collaboration with Richmond or with the designer's assistant, Michael Rope, Scott was awarded patents for the frame design and for other features of the ship, including the wires that restrained its gasbags, its gas valves and its internally located passenger accommodation.

== Personal life ==
In 1919, Scott married Jessie Campbell, eldest daughter of Archibald Jack Campbell, general manager of Beardmore's Dalmuir shipyards. The couple had one son and three daughters. During Scott's time at the Royal Airship Works, the family resided at Cotton End, near the airfield at Cardington. (Many years after Scott's death, in April 1972, the Goodyear Blimp Europa broke away from its mooring mast at Cardington and came to rest, deflated, in a tree in the grounds of the former Scott residence.)

== Death ==
After the R100's successful trip to Canada, attention turned to plans for a similar flight to India by the R101, in which Lord Thomson (then Secretary of State for Air) and other dignitaries would take part. However, extensive modifications, culminating in the lengthening of the airship, were needed to ensure sufficient disposable lift for the trip. The newly lengthened R101 emerged from its shed on 1 October 1930.

Only one test flight was conducted before departure for India; this flight began on the evening of 1 October and was intended to last for 24 hours but was cut to 16 hours 51 minutes. Provision had been made for the flight to be curtailed "if the ship behaved well and if Major Scott was satisfied." According to Sir Peter Masefield in his 1982 history of the R101 project, To Ride the Storm, when the final decision to depart for India was taken on 2 October, Irwin, Richmond and Director of Airship Design R.B.B. Colmore, along with Scott, were "all satisfied that the airship was sound and airworthy and that the flight...could now be mounted with confidence".

The R101 left Cardington, with Scott and 53 other people aboard, at 18:36 GMT on 4 October 1930, bound for Karachi with an intermediate stop at Ismaïlia in Egypt. (Scott had sought to expedite the departure in the hope of avoiding an approaching low-pressure area.) Opinions differ on Scott's mood at the time of departure; Masefield quoted F. A. de V. Robertson of Flight to the effect that Scott's final words before departure were "The ship is really good now. I'm sure we'll have a splendid flight—and we'll see you back here just two weeks from now". However, another historian of the programme, Geoffrey Chamberlain, presented a different view in his 1984 book Airships—Cardington, citing comments allegedly made by Scott to Ted Stupple, an R100 crewman who was a "frequent visitor" to Scott's household, before departure. According to Chamberlain, Scott asked Stupple to "keep an eye" on his (Scott's) pregnant wife, describing the R101 as "an old ragbag" that was "never going to make it".

While flying over northern France in stormy conditions around 02:07 on 5 October, the R101 entered an uncommanded dive before recovering momentarily, then diving a second time, striking the ground at Allonne, Oise, (near Beauvais) and catching fire. Scott and 45 others were killed in the blaze, and two more individuals died of their injuries shortly afterwards; there were only six survivors. A subsequent inquiry blamed a "substantial loss of gas" for the accident.

Scott's body was never identified. The victims were returned to London via special trains and warships to lie in state in Westminster Hall prior to a memorial service at St. Paul's Cathedral on 11 October; they were then taken by rail to Cardington and buried in a common grave in the cemetery of St. Mary the Virgin.

== Reputation ==
=== Praise ===
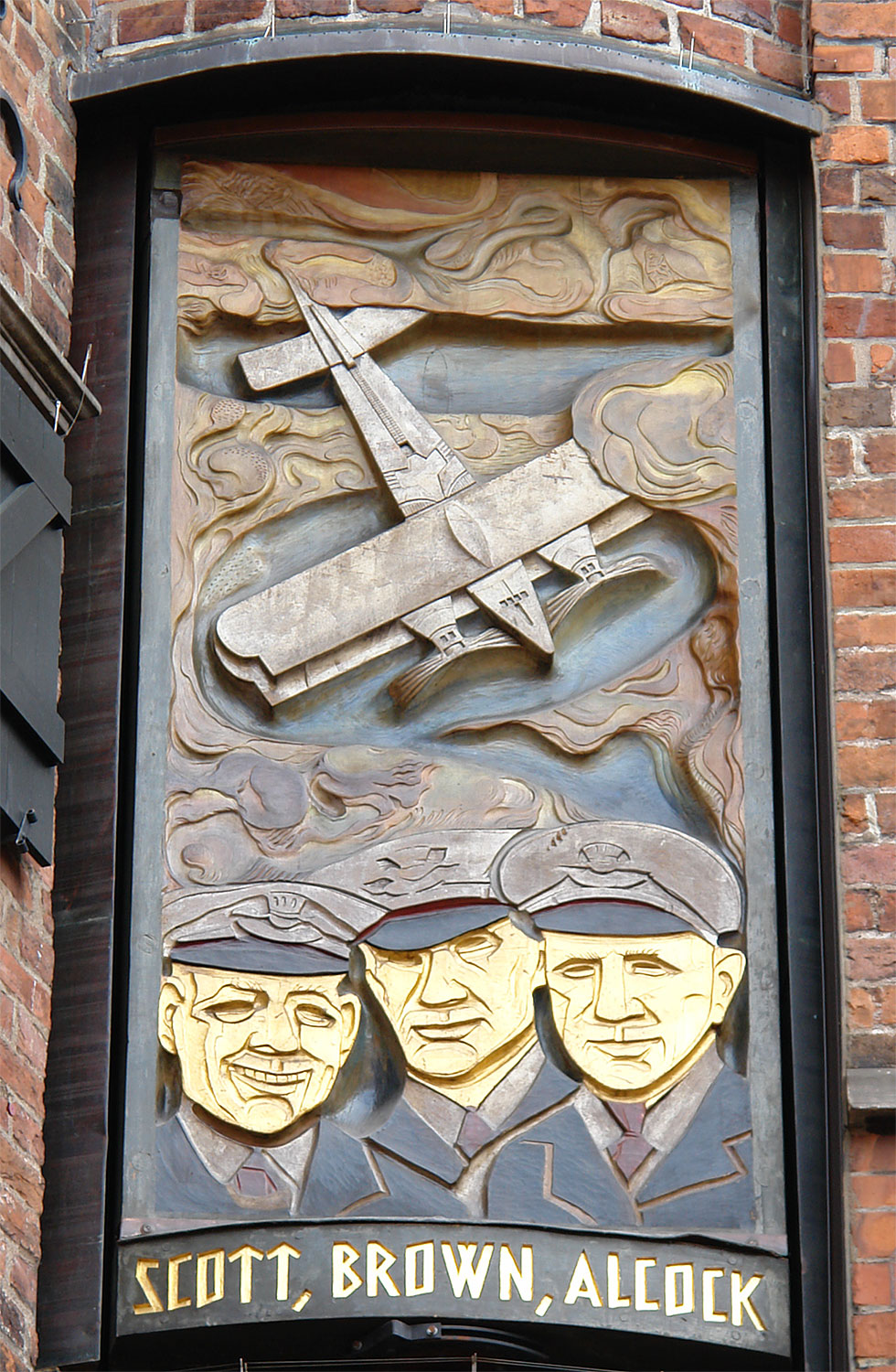
Panel from Hoetger on the Glockenspiel House in Bremen

Both before and after his death, Scott was hailed for his achievements as an aviator, most notably the R34's Atlantic crossing, which, according to the Times's obituary, "immediately placed Great Britain at the head of airship construction and achievement". The Dictionary of National Biography described him as "without doubt the foremost British airship commander of his time" and praised his "cool, alert and expert handling" of the R34 during storms on the outward leg of its transatlantic flight.

Alongside his achievements with the R34 and R100, Flight highlighted his decision to climb before conducting high-speed trials on the R36, thus (as described above) saving the ship from disaster when it experienced elevator and rudder failures. According to Flight, "there would probably have been one less tragedy on record" had similar precautions been taken in the testing of the US Army's Roma (which struck power lines and burned, with the loss of 34 lives, after experiencing a rudder failure on a test flight in 1922). The same journal predicted that "[i]f airships become...a regular craft either of commerce or of naval patrol, Scott will be ranked with Eckener as the two greatest among the early airship captains" and likened Scott to "his namesake, Captain Scott of South Pole fame" as "a gallant gentleman who gave his life in the attempt to solve great problems". According to the Times, "[n]one who ever had the good fortune to watch [Scott] handle a big airship in good weather or in bad [would] ever forget his consummate capability."

In Bremen are 10 Panels depicting seafarers from the sculptor Bernhard Hoetger on the Glockenspiel House in the Böttcherstraße. One Panel shows Scott alongside Arthur Whitten Brown and John Alcock, who piloted the first non-stop transatlantic flight.

=== Criticism ===
However, some commentators have questioned aspects of Scott's judgement as an aviator. According to Sir Peter Masefield in To Ride the Storm, Scott "had a reputation...for determination and also for 'ham-handedness' [Masefield's quotes]". Masefield cited a series of landing accidents involving Scott, including the previously discussed incidents with the Parseval No. 4 at Barrow in 1915, the R36 at Pulham in 1921 and the R33 at Pulham in 1925. There were also a number of incidents in the R101's early days in which Scott took over control from Irwin during mooring or hangaring operations and made mistakes that resulted in serious delays or, in one case, in damage to the Cardington mooring mast. In another episode, Scott released water ballast without Irwin's knowledge while the latter was conducting a landing. Both Irwin and his first officer, Noël Atherstone, expressed concern over these incidents.

Moreover, according to Masefield, by the time the Imperial Airship Scheme came to fruition, Scott was "not the man he had been" at the time of the R34's Atlantic crossing; his judgement "had frequently been a cause for concern" and he "resented advice". Scott had taken to "unwise lunchtime drink", probably as a result of ill-health, and was "having difficulty in holding the position he had deservedly won". Masefield characterised Scott as "dogmatic, aloof and ill, reluctant to delegate to the Captains of the ships".

Nevil Shute Norway, better known as the novelist Nevil Shute, was chief calculator (and later deputy chief engineer) under Barnes Wallis on the design of the R100 and a passenger on that ship's transatlantic flight. In his 1954 autobiography, Slide Rule, Shute criticised Scott for his decision to pass through, rather than avoid, a thunderstorm on the outbound leg of that flight; according to Shute, "even with the lesser knowledge of those days, Scott should have known better". Shute characterised Scott's decision on this occasion as "a reckless one". To Masefield, the episode was "another example of Scott's predilection to 'press-on regardless' [Masefield's quotes]", something that had been successful on the R34's Atlantic flight but caused "many problems" in later years.

In respect of the R101's ill-fated India flight, Masefield argued that the departure was made at a time when "prudence would have dictated an operational postponement for better weather" and blamed the "known and obvious deterioration in [Scott's] judgement and competence" and the unwillingness of senior officials at the Air Ministry and Cardington to address the issue, as well as Scott's own unwillingness to acknowledge that airships were not "all-weather craft". According to Masefield, it would have been "in character" for Irwin and Atherstone to consider "a temporary and precautionary return to base to await better weather" around 19:00 on 4 October 1930, 24 minutes after departure from Cardington, but equally in character for Scott to be "all for pressing on". Masefield believed that Scott was the "final arbiter" of the decision not to turn back and that this decision was made around 19:19.

Shute also criticised Scott's judgement in relation to the R101's final flight. According to Shute, given that the R101 had "never flown in bad weather" and had undergone "virtually no trials at all" since its lengthening for the India flight, "it now [1954] appears reckless that Scott should have pressed on" when the weather outlook worsened two hours after departure from Cardington. In mitigation, however, Shute noted that in 1930 "a pilot was expected to be brave and resolute, a daredevil who was not afraid to take risks" and that "to turn back would destroy the whole of [Lord Thomson's] political programme." (Shute viewed Lord Thomson as "primarily responsible for the organisation that produced the disaster.")
