= Herbert Carmichael Irwin =

Irish aviator and Olympic athlete

Herbert Irwin
- Born: Herbert Carmichael Irwin; 26 June 1894
- Died: 5 October 1930 (aged 36); Beauvais, France
- Cause of death: R101 crash
- Resting place: St Mary's Church, Cardington, Bedfordshire
- Known for: Airship commander; Olympic athlete
- Spouse: Olivia Teacher
- Awards: AFC
- Aviation career
- Air force: RNAS, RAF
- Battles: First World War
- Rank: Flight Lieutenant

Flight Lieutenant Herbert Carmichael "Bird" Irwin, AFC (26 June 1894 – 5 October 1930) was an Irish aviator and Olympic athlete.

During World War I, Irwin served in the Royal Naval Air Service (RNAS), where he commanded non-rigid airships. After the Great War, the "tall sensitive Irishman" commanded larger rigid airships, initially for the Royal Air Force (RAF) and later on secondment to the (civilian) Royal Airship Works as part of the Imperial Airship Scheme.

Both before and after WWI, Irwin also had a successful career as a middle- and long-distance and cross-country runner, and he represented Great Britain at the 1920 Summer Olympics in Antwerp, Belgium.

Irwin's aviation career culminated in his command of the airship R101, the largest airship in the world at the time; he was killed along with another 47 people when it crashed in northern France on a flight from Britain to India.

== Early life ==
Herbert Carmichael Irwin was born in Dundrum, County Dublin, on 26 June 1894, the second of four sons born to Thomas Frederick Irwin, a solicitor, and his wife Elinor Emily Lindsay Carroll, a daughter of the rector of Dundrum. He was baptised in Taney Parish on 1 August. Irwin's father and two uncles, Herbert Irwin and Major General Sir James Murray Irwin, were noted members of the Dublin University Rowing Club, and one of his grandmothers was a sister of Major-General Sir Herbert Benjamin Edwardes. His godfather was Sir Thomas Myles, a well-known Dublin surgeon, Home Rule campaigner and, later, gunrunner for the Irish Volunteers.

Irwin attended St. Andrew's College, Dublin, from August 1909 to June 1913.

== Athletic career ==
Irwin was a member of the Dublin athletic club Clonliffe Harriers, which commemorates him with a trophy, the Irwin Memorial Challenge Cup. Aged 18, in 1914, he was the Irish four-mile champion, as well as the winner of the Irish senior and junior cross-country championships. After the war, he went on to represent Great Britain at the 1920 Summer Olympics in Antwerp.

At the Games, Irwin finished second in Semifinal 1 of the men's 5000 metres on 16 August, achieving a career best. However, he was unable to repeat his performance in the final on the following day, finishing twelfth. After the event, Irwin went on to be the Irish mile and four-mile champion in 1921. He was also the RAF mile champion in 1920 and RAF three-mile champion in 1919, 1920 and 1922.

Irwin's personal bests were 4:33.8 in the mile (set in 1920), 15:15.6 in the three miles (set in 1919) and 15:17.8 in the 5000 metres (set at the 1920 Olympics).

== Military career ==
Irwin joined the Royal Naval Air Service (RNAS) in 1915 and was entered as a Probationary Flight Sub-Lieutenant on 13 August of that year. He went on to command non-rigid airships of the SS Zero, Coastal and NS types "in Home Waters and the East Mediterranean" during 1916 and 1917 and was promoted to Flight Lieutenant with seniority 1 April 1917. At RNAS East Fortune, Scotland, he "enjoyed the reputation of having the smartest ship". Under the Royal Air Force, which subsumed the RNAS in 1918, he was granted a short-service commission as Flight Lieutenant on 24 October 1919.

Irwin subsequently commanded the rigid R29, with Noël Atherstone, who would again be his second-in-command on R101, as his first officer. He became captain of the R36, by now regarded as a civil aircraft, in 1921. On the R36's 14 June 1921 trial flight, with journalists and Metropolitan Police representatives aboard, to assess the airship's value for road-traffic control during the Ascot Races, he served as an officer under Major George Herbert Scott (who had commanded the R34 on its Atlantic crossing in 1919 and was to become another victim of the R101 disaster).

On 21 June, Irwin and Scott were involved in an incident with the same ship when, approaching RNAS Pulham, Scott "took over from Lt Irwin and decided to direct the landing himself." An excessively rapid approach to the mooring mast led to a violent deceleration and accidental ballast release, causing a sudden pitch-up that badly damaged the ship's bow. Irwin "broke down" on seeing the scale of the damage. The accident was attributed to equipment failure, and the R36 never flew again (despite various proposals to recommission it), remaining in its hangar until broken up in June 1926. The episode was not the first landing accident in which Scott had been involved and foreshadowed several incidents involving the R101. Subsequently, Irwin became captain of the R80.

Irwin held ground positions at RAF Headquarters (Coastal Area), at RAF Leuchars and with the Air Ministry's Director of Operations and Intelligence before his first transfer to the Royal Airship Works at Cardington, Bedfordshire in 1924. After being transferred back to the RAF (see below), he commanded the RAF School of Balloon Training at Larkhill, Salisbury Plain, between 1926 and 1928. He was granted a permanent commission as Flight Lieutenant on 1 January 1926.

Although on secondment to the RAW, Irwin was studying in his spare time for his RAF promotional examination at the time of his death. (However, he was the intended commander of the R101's proposed successor, R102; Atherstone would then have taken command of the R101.)

== The Imperial Airship Scheme ==
Proposals for an airship network linking Britain to its colonies and dominions emerged in the early 1920s but, due to economic and political factors, only bore fruit with the 1929 launch of two large prototype passenger airships from competing manufacturers: the R101 from the state-owned Royal Airship Works, and the R100 from the private-sector Airship Guarantee Company, a subsidiary of Vickers-Armstrongs. Irwin was involved in the programme in two capacities, first commanding the R33 on experimental flights to aid the design of the new ships, and later as captain of the R101.

=== R33 ===
Irwin was transferred to the Royal Airship Works at Cardington, Bedfordshire on 1 December 1924. There he took command of the R33, which had been recommissioned as part of the programme after four years in mothballs, on 2 April 1925. Under his command, the ship flew to Pulham in Norfolk for aerodynamic testing. However, the R33 broke away from its mast, at a time when Irwin was not aboard, during a gale on the night of 16–17 April and—after being blown backwards to the Netherlands, then making a safe return to Pulham—spent six months in its hangar, undergoing repairs that included the complete replacement of the nose section. The R33 returned to service in October, then was mothballed again in the spring of 1926 and resurrected in October of that year before its final withdrawal in November; it was eventually broken up in 1928. Irwin transferred back to the RAF in 1926.

=== R101 ===
==== Early flights and incidents ====
In 1929, Irwin returned to the Royal Airship Works to command the newly completed R101, which first flew on 14 October. However, the ship's second flight on 18 October ended in an unfortunate incident, reminiscent of the one that had ended the R36's career and again involving Scott, who by now was Officer in Charge of Flying and Training at the Works. Scott "not only insisted on taking over for the landing from [Irwin] but also made a mess of the job," upsetting the ship's trim and permitting it to over-ride the Cardington mooring mast. Irwin and Atherstone were "thoroughly upset" by the episode. Subsequently, on 21 October, Scott took over from Irwin while moving the R101 from the mast to its shed and "so confused the issues" that the task was greatly protracted. Other incidents took place on the ship's third flight on 1 November when Scott released ballast during the landing without Irwin's knowledge and on the subsequent flight, when Scott took charge while landing at Cardington on 3 November and caused damage to one of the ship's reefing booms.

==== The endurance flight and afterwards ====
On 17 and 18 November 1929, the R101 made an "endurance" flight of over 30 hours' duration (in fact, this flight was to be the longest the ship ever completed), taking the airship over England, Scotland, Ireland and Wales. According to Atherstone's diary, as the R101 approached Dublin Bay at 08:00 on 18 November, Irwin "took over for the Forenoon Watch and flew the ship in majestic sweeps over his native land and city"; the R101 then passed down the coast to Bray and "gave the Kingstown–Holyhead mail boat a good start and then hooshed past her headed for the same place." In Anglesey, the ship overflew Rhosneigr, where Irwin's mother lived. According to the report of the subsequent inquiry into the R101 disaster, the R101's performance on this flight "gave much satisfaction" to both Irwin and Major Scott.

At this point, the ship had still not been formally handed over to Irwin. According to Atherstone's diary entry for 2 December, Irwin was "fed [up] to the teeth about the way promises made to him by Colmore [the Director of Airship Development] and Scott have not been kept." Irwin had been "definitely assured" that the R101 would be handed over to him before entering its shed for a refit that began on 1 December, but he was left in what Atherstone called the "unenviable position of being unofficial captain of the ship."

==== Modifications and preparations for the India flight ====
Lord Thomson, the Secretary of State for Air, expressed his interest in making a flight to India after travelling as a passenger on the new airship's second flight. However, the R101, as originally built, had insufficient disposable lift to make the flight. Weight-saving measures and efforts to improve lift were initiated and completed in early 1930. R101 made three flights in late June 1930 and, in a report to Scott on 1 July, Irwin expressed concerns over "flapping" of the ship's outer cover, possible malfunctioning of gas valves and "an abundance of holes" in the gas cells due to chafing against girders. In a previous conversation with Squadron Leader Ralph Booth, captain of the R100, on 27 June, Irwin had expressed the opinion that "most of the losses were from the gas valves", due to "excessive pulsing and flapping" of the envelope fabric.

The R101 then returned to its shed for rebuilding with an added section. It came out of the shed on 1 October and departed later that day on what would be its only test flight before departure for India. However, the flight, planned to last 24 hours, was cut short to 16 hours 51 minutes. At the inquiry following the crash, Irwin and the other officers were described as "undoubtedly well satisfied with the performance of the ship" but Squadron Leader Booth told the inquiry that he had no reason to think that Irwin had changed his previous view that "more elaborate trials in bad weather would be expedient", and the inquiry report stated that it was "impossible to avoid agreeing" with Booth's opinion.

It was eventually decided that the flight from Cardington to Karachi (then northern British India, now Pakistan) and back, with a stop at Ismaïlia, Egypt, in both directions, would set out on 4 October 1930. Lord Thomson, Director of Civil Aviation Sefton Brancker and other dignitaries would be aboard. Major Scott was in charge of the flight. He had travelled on the R100's trip to Montreal and back in July and August 1930. As he explained his position to a Flight correspondent, he was "officer in command of the flight" and decided "all such points as when the ship would sail, her course, her speed, her altitude." Irwin was the airship's captain, in charge of the crew and discipline." As James Leasor phrased it in his book The Millionth Chance, "Scott was in the position of an Admiral in his flagship; Irwin was the flagship captain and responsible for [crew] discipline."

Sources differ on the degree to which Irwin expressed concern as the India flight neared. Leasor quoted Elsie O'Neill, the widow of one of the passengers, to the effect that Irwin "kept on saying 'They're rushing us. We're not ready, we're just not ready'" when she and her husband visited the ship prior to the flight. Moreover, according to the airship historian Giles Camplin, it was "often said" that Irwin "considered stepping down" but was dissuaded from this by "the certain knowledge that others would step forward to take his place." However, Sir Peter Masefield, another historian of the R101, believed that "Colmore, Scott, Richmond [the ship's designer] and Irwin were all satisfied that the airship was sound and airworthy and that the flight...could be mounted in confidence". Notwithstanding this, both Masefield and the inquiry report observed that the programme of trial flights that Irwin himself drew up in 1929 had not been completed at the time of departure.

== Personal life ==
Irwin became engaged to Olivia Marjory Macdonald Teacher, daughter of Dr and Mrs Charles C. Teacher of Fareham, Hampshire, and formerly of North Berwick, in early 1925. The couple were married at Holy Trinity Church, Fareham, on 23 September 1926. In Bedford, the Irwins lived at Long Acre, Putnoe Lane; the R101 overflew their house on its final, ill-fated flight.

After Irwin's death, his widow received an annual pension of £100, plus a gratuity of £200. The couple had no children.

== Death ==
=== R101's final flight ===
Irwin came on duty before 06:00 GMT on 4 October 1930, in preparation for departure later that day; he "had very little rest while shouldering the chief responsibility for the preparations for departure and for the VIP passengers on board." Moreover, although the captain was theoretically not required to stand watch, the presence of only three watch-keeping officers – Irwin, Atherstone, and second officer Maurice Steff – on board meant that "there was no alternative but for...each to take his turn in three-hour shifts." (Atherstone had called this situation "really quite wrong" in his 26 August diary entry.)

Irwin was in charge of the ship's departure from the Cardington mast, which took place at 18:36. According to Masefield, in the conditions prevailing, it would have been "in character" for both Irwin and Atherstone to consider "a temporary and precautionary return to base to await better weather", around 19:00, as the ship completed its departing circuit of Bedford, but also for Scott to be "all for pressing on". Masefield believed the final decision not to turn back was taken at 19:19, with Scott "certainly the final arbiter."

Irwin came on watch at 23:00; about two hours later, he spoke to Harry Leech (a foreman engineer from the Airship Works, who survived the subsequent accident) and William Gent (chief engineer of the R101, who did not survive) in the ship's smoking room but "made no remark about the behaviour of the ship except that the after-engine [which had given trouble earlier] was continuing to run satisfactorily". During the flight, Irwin and Leech also discussed the ship's continuing problems with gas leakage.

At 02:00 on 5 October, by which time the ship was cruising in stormy conditions over northern France (the weather outlook having worsened significantly since departure), Irwin was relieved by Steff and went directly to bed. At this time, he apparently "felt no concern about the progress of the flight or the integrity of R101." However, errors in Irwin's midnight radio message may have reflected the effects of fatigue; moreover, Steff was less experienced than Irwin and, likewise, the coxswains who operated the airship's elevator and rudder controls were less experienced than their counterparts on the preceding watch; also they would not have become accustomed to the "feel" of the ship. Thus, the crew's ability to cope with any crisis that might arise may have been reduced.

Within seven minutes of the change of watch, the R101 entered an uncommanded dive, then recovered slightly before entering a second dive, making contact with the ground at low forward speed, ploughing into the edge of a wood (the Bois des Coutûmes at Allonne, Oise, near Beauvais) and catching fire at about 02:09. Of the 54 people aboard, 46, including Irwin and all the other officers of the ship, were killed; two more died later in hospital.

The subsequent inquiry attributed the ship's descent to a "substantial loss of gas".

=== Funeral ===
Irwin and the other victims received full state honours. The bodies were transported to London via special trains and warships before lying in state in Westminster Hall. Irwin's body was identified in London. Following a memorial service at St Paul's Cathedral on 11 October, the victims were taken by special train to Bedford for burial in a common grave in the cemetery of St Mary the Virgin, Cardington.

== Paranormal claims ==
Eileen J. Garrett, an Irish medium, claimed to have made contact with Irwin at a séance held with Harry Price at the National Laboratory of Psychical Research two days after the disaster, while attempting to contact the then recently deceased Sir Arthur Conan Doyle, and discussed possible causes of the accident. The event "attracted worldwide attention", thanks to the presence of a reporter. Major Oliver Villiers, a friend of Brancker, Scott, Irwin, Colmore and others aboard the ship, participated in further séances with Garrett, at which he claimed to have contacted both Irwin and other victims. However, Garrett's claims have been questioned by several commentators. Researcher Melvin Harris who studied the case wrote that the information described in Garrett's séances were "either commonplace, easily absorbed bits and pieces, or plain gobbledegook. The so-called secret information just doesn't exist." The magician John Booth analyzed the mediumship of Garrett and the paranormal claims of R101 and considered her to be a fraud.
