= The Wide Net and Other Stories =

- First edition
- Publisher: Harcourt Brace Jovanovich
- Publication date: 1943
- Media type: Print (hardback)
- Pages: 214
- OCLC: 8000347

The Wide Net and Other Stories is a collection of short fiction by Eudora Welty published in 1943 by Harcourt Brace Jovanovich.

== Stories ==
- "First Love" (Harper's Bazaar, February 1942)
- "The Wide Net" (Harper's Magazine, May 1942)
- "A Still Moment" (American Preface, Spring 1942)
- "Asphodel" (The Yale Review, September 1942)
- "The Winds" (Harper's Bazaar, August 1942)
- "The Purple Hat" (Harper's Bazaar, September, 1941)
- "Livvie" (The Atlantic Monthly, November 1942; a.k.a "Livvie is Back")
- "At the Landing" (Tomorrow, April 1943)

== Reviews ==
Literary critic and author Robert Penn Warren distinguishes between Welty's first collection, A Curtain of Green (1941) and her second, The Wide Net. Whereas the former volume exhibits "a great variety...in subject matter and method, and more particularly, in tone," the latter volume "we do not find the surprises." Rather, "the stories are more nearly cut to one pattern."

The stories in The Wide Net, though exhibiting impressive literary technique—"fine writing"—exhibits a subjectivism that, according to Warren, mars the material. Warren cites Diana Trilling as among the critics who "were disturbed by the recent developments of Welty's work." In a contemporary criticism of the collection, Trilling wrote: "Welty has developed her technical virtuosity to the point where it outweighs the uses to which it is put, and her vision to the point of nightmare." Trilling's further characterized the writing in the volume as "falsely poetic," "untrue," and "insincere," a result of Welty's "extreme infusion of subjectivism and private sensibility."

Novelist Elizabeth Bowen registered this comment: "One or two of the stories in her second collection, The Wide Net," made me terrified that she might be heading for esoteric incomprehensibility."

In retrospective remarks on The Wide Net, Pierpont, Claudia Roth in The New Yorker wrote: "Published in 1943, to disappointing reviews, the stories are often artificial and over-literary, the work of a gifted writer clearly struggling with the burden of being an Author."

== Sources ==
- Johnston, Carol Ann. 1997. Eudora Welty: A Study of the Short Fiction. Twayne Publishers, New York. Gordon Weaver, general editor. ISBN 0-8057-7936-1
- Marrs, Suzanne. 1997. Place and the Displaced in Eudora Welty's "The Bride of the Innisfallen. The Mississippi Quarterly, Fall 1997, Vol. 50, No. 4, pp. 647-668 The Johns Hopkins University Press. https://www.jstor.org/stable/pdf/26476902.pdf?refreqid=fastly-default%3A2eb88f41bec64a3de1ee601d75e6e941&ab_segments=&initiator=&acceptTC=1
- Marrs, Suzanne. 2005. Eudora Welty: A Biography. Harvest Books, Orlando, Florida. ISBN 978-0-15-603063-2 (paperback)
- Olney, James. 1998. Where the Voice Came From. New York Times. November 22, 1998. https://archive.nytimes.com/www.nytimes.com/books/98/11/22/reviews/981122.22olneyt.html Accessed 22 September 2025.
- Pierpont, Claudia Roth. 1998. A Perfect Lady. The New Yorker, October 5, 1998. https://www.newyorker.com/magazine/1998/10/05/a-perfect-lady Accessed 22 September 2025.
- Trilling, Diana. 1943. "Fiction in Review." Review of The Wide Net. The Nation, 2 October 1943.
- Welty, Eudora. 1943. The Wide Net and Other Stories. Harcourt Brace Jovanovich, New York. OCLC 8000347
- Welty, Eudora. 2001. The Collected Stories of Eudora Welta. Barnes & Noble Modern Classics. ISBN 0-7607-2409-1
- Warren, Robert Penn. 1987. The Robert Penn Warren Reader. Random House, New York. Reprinted from a 1944 essay published by William Morris Agency in Carol Ann Johnston's Eudora Welty: A Study of the Short Fiction. pp. 158–169. Twayne Publishers, New York. Gordon Weaver, general editor. ISBN 0-8057-7936-1
