= At the Landing =

- Short story by Eudora Welty
- Country: United States
- Language: English

Publication
- Publisher: Tomorrow
- Publication date: 1943

"At the Landing" is a short story by Eudora Welty, originally appearing in Tomorrow (April 1943) and first collected in The Wide Net and Other Stories (1943) published by Harcourt Brace.

== Plot ==
"The Landing" is told from a third-person point-of-view by a reliable narrator and presented three sections indicated by Roman numerals.

I

The story is set in the fictional village in the Deep South known locally as The Landing. It was formerly located along a river which has since changed course isolating the community. The region still suffers intermittent flooding. Jenny, a girl in her early twenties, lives with her elderly grandfather who has cared for her since the death of her grandmother. Formerly local elites, now impoverished, the proud but introverted girl and her paternalistic old man resented the poor locals.

A ranch hand, Billy Floyd, who fishes the river for catfish, approaches Jenny casually in a field; both are stirred by one another and they rendezvous for walks in the forest; a kiss is exchanged. Only vaguely aware of Floyd's sexual intentions, Jenny observes him flirting with an albino girl.

The grandfather visits Jenny in her bedroom the night of his death; it is unclear whether she dreams of this encounter. He says: "That Floyd's catfish has gone loose and free" and warns her not to speak to the young man.

II

The Landing suffers a destructive summer monsoon. The community is inundated, and Jenny is stranded. Floyd arrives in a boat and rescues her. He takes her to high ground and rapes her, after which he prepares a meal for them. She believes she is in love.

III

Jenny returns to The Landing, now devastated by the flooding. In the aftermath of the disaster in July, Jenny encounters local fishermen at their fish camp. She is told that Floyd is out fishing in dangerous waters. While she waits for his return, the fishermen take turns raping her. When she collapses unconscious after the assaults, a local lady asks "Is she asleep? Is she in a spell? Or is she dead?" The men reply "She's waiting for Billy Floyd."

== Background ==
Welty wrote "The Landing" in August of 1942 when the United States was undergoing mass military mobilization after entering World War II against Nazi Germany and Imperial Japan. At the time, she was deeply involved in a relationship with writer and high school sweetheart John F. Robinson, who had just joined the Army Air Corps.

Biographer Suzanne Marrs suggests that the narrative of "At the Landing", which involves the rape of the young female protagonist by her lover and a gang-rape by local fishermen, was informed by her opposition to "misuse of power [and] the violation of individual sanctity that Eudora Welty associated with fascism and even at times more generally with politicians." Initially discontented with the manuscript, she informed her agent that she was considering discarding it.

"At the Landing" was published in April 1943 by Tomorrow.

== Theme ==
"At the Landing", placed at the end of the short-story volume, provides a thematic synthesis of one of Welty's key concerns: the dangers implicit in living a sheltered life when an individual is inevitably thrust into contact with social realities. According to biographer Carol Ann Johnston, the story includes "one of the darkest moments in all of Welty's work."

Because the story follows Jenny's fate beyond her realization that she needs freedom, "At the Landing" presents a more devastating look at the dangers of insularity than does any story in A Curtain of Green (1941).

Welty dramatizes the grave consequences for "those too naive to recognize their vulnerability."

Author and critic Robert Penn Warren informs readers that the tragic narrative of the story would be suitable for treatment by social critic Theodore Dreiser, author of Sister Carrie (1900).

== Sources ==
- Johnston, Carol Ann. 1997. Eudora Welty: A Study of the Short Fiction. Twayne Publishers, New York. Gordon Weaver, general editor. ISBN 0-8057-7936-1
- Marrs, Suzanne. 2005. Eudora Welty: A Biography. Harvest Books, Orlando, Florida. ISBN 978-0-15-603063-2 (paperback)
- Welty, Eudora. 1943. The Wide Net and Other Stories. Harcourt Brace Javonovitch, New York. OCLC 8000347
- Welty, Eudora. 2001. The Collected Stories of Eudora Welty. Barnes & Noble Modern Classics edition. ISBN 0-7607-2409-1
