= The Wide Net =

- Short story by Eudora Welty
- Country: United States
- Language: English

Publication
- Publisher: Harper's Magazine
- Publication date: May 1942

"The Wide Net" is a short story by Eudora Welty originally appearing in Harper's Magazine (May 1942) and first collected in The Wide Net and Other Stories (1943) by Harcourt Brace Javonovitch.

One of Welty's Natchez trace stories, it was dedicated to her confidant John Fraser Robinson.

"The Wide Net" won the 1942 O. Henry Memorial Award.

== Plot ==
"The Wide Net" is presented from a third-person point-of-view by a reliable narrator. The story is set in a rural village along the Natchez trace in the American Deep South.

The young William Wallace Jamie is the newlywed husband to Hazel, his child-bride. The pretty daughter of doting parents, Hazel is three months pregnant. As such, she resists William's sexual advances - "stuck out her tongue or ran around the table" at her husbands' advances. He retaliates by going on an overnight drinking spree with two of his friends. Arriving home the next morning, he is irritated to find that she is not awaiting his return. He is further alarmed by a note she has written, declaring she has walked to the nearby Pearl River to drown herself.

Panicked by this development, William enlists the support of one of his drinking buddies, as well as members of two local families, the Malones and the Doyles, to discover her whereabouts. Together they march to the home of Doc, the local wise man and the only owner of a large net - the "wide net" of the story's title - used to haul the river to retrieve submerged corpses in case of drowning.

William, Doc and company proceed to the Pearl River and spend the day dragging the river. The ensemble is distracted by the abundant wildlife, including alligators. An intense electrical storm drives the searchers to temporarily seek cover. By noon they are occupied with fishing, and enjoy a fish fry, after which they all take a nap. William remains anxious and distracted by the ordeal: he astonishes his companions when he forgets the name of the river they are dragging. Doc offers sententious observations on the proceedings.

No body is recovered. The search party disperses and William returns home. There he finds Hazel: she admits she had concealed herself and secretly observed him read the note and depart that morning. After William spanks Hazel for her childish subterfuge, the couple reconciles.

== Critical appraisal ==
When Welty visited Vanderbilt University in 1980 at the invitation of British author V. S. Pritchett, a short story writer who she greatly admired. At a literary seminar taught by Pritchett, Welty's reading of "The Wide Net" to professors and graduate students was received warmly.

== Theme ==
Literary critic David McWhirter characterizes the story as a comic critique of some early 20th century American male fiction, in particular the "beleaguered masculinity" found in the works of T. S. Eliot, William Faulkner and Ernest Hemingway.

"The Wide Net" consciously interrogates and transforms a persistent and central paradigm in modernist constructions of masculinity, one which premises manhood on a horrified flight from female sexuality, and especially...in manifestations of women's reproductive functions including menstruation, pregnancy, childbirth, and abortion.

== Sources ==
- Johnston, Carol Ann. 1997. Eudora Welty: A Study of the Short Fiction. Twayne Publishers, New York. Gordon Weaver, general editor. ISBN 0-8057-7936-1
- McWhirter, David. 2009. Fish Stories: Revising Masculine Ritual in Eudora Welty's "The Wide Net" The Mississippi Quarterly , April 2009, Supplement: SPECIAL ISSUE: Eudora Welty Centennial (April 2009), pp. 35-58 The Johns Hopkins University Press https://www.jstor.org/stable/26477305
- Marrs, Suzanne. 2005. Eudora Welty: A Biography. Harvest Books, Orlando, Florida. ISBN 978-0-15-603063-2 (paperback)
- Pierpont, Claudia Roth. 1998. A Perfect Lady. The New Yorker, October 5, 1998. https://www.newyorker.com/magazine/1998/10/05/a-perfect-lady Accessed 22 September, 2025.
- Welty, Eudora. 1943. The Wide Net and Other Stories. Harcourt Brace Javonovitch, New York. OCLC 8000347
- Welty, Eudora. 2001. The Collected Stories of Eudora Welty. Barnes & Noble Modern Classics edition. ISBN 0-7607-2409-1
