= Parapsychology Foundation =

American non-profit organization studying paranormal activity

The Parapsychology Foundation is a non-profit organization founded in 1951 by the medium Eileen J. Garrett and Frances Payne Bolton, Ohio's first female representative in Congress. The foundation is based in New York. They offer grants and scholarships to those undertaking study in the paranormal. The organization also founded the Eileen J. Garrett Library, which eventually made its way to Greenport, Suffolk County, New York. The contents of library have since been moved to the University of Maryland, Baltimore County and have become the Eileen J. Garrett Parapsychology Foundation collection.

Garrett claimed to be a medium and founded the organization with the explicit purpose of scientifically proving the existence of the soul.

The current Executive Administrator is Anastasia Damalas. Lisette Coly, granddaughter of Garrett, is Foundation President. At one point the organization owned a conference center in Saint-Paul-de-Vence, France and has subsequently hosted numerous conferences. At their New York headquarters, they host numerous lecture series. As of 2001 the organization had 200 active researchers. The organization publishes the International Journal of Parapsychology.
