= Eileen J. Garrett =

Irish medium and parapsychologist (1893–1970)

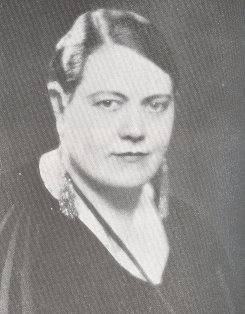
- Born: Emily Jane Savage; 14 March 1892; Beauparc, County Meath, Ireland
- Died: 15 September 1970 (aged 77); Nice, France
- Occupations: Medium, Parapsychologist, writer
- Writing career
- Period: 20th Century
- Genre: New Age
- Subject: Parapsychology
- Literary movement: Spiritualism
- Website: parapsychology.org

Eileen Jeanette Vancho Lyttle Garrett (14 March 1892 – 15 September 1970) was an Irish medium and parapsychologist. Garrett's alleged psychic abilities were tested in the 1930s by Joseph Rhine and others. Rhine claimed that she had genuine psychic abilities, but subsequent studies were unable to replicate his results, and Garrett's abilities were later shown to be consistent with chance guessing. Garrett elicited controversy after the R101 crash, when she held a series of séances at the National Laboratory of Psychical Research claiming to be in contact with victims of the disaster. John Booth, and others, investigated her claims, and found them to be valueless, easily explainable, or the result of fraud.

Garrett had four children. She died after a long illness on 15 September 1970, in Nice, France.

== Biography ==
During her lifetime, Garrett gave her own birthday as March 17 (St Patrick's Day), 1893. However, census records show that she was actually born March 14, 1892, and that her birth name was Emily Jane Savage. Garrett published three major autobiographies and many other statements which contradict each other on basic details of her early life. She described an early childhood on a bucolic country estate in Ireland. Research published in 2024 and 2025 showed that this was mostly likely a description of an estate where her uncle worked as a gardener. She also claimed to have been married three times and to have run a teashop and a hostel for wounded soldiers, but there is no evidence that any of this was true; she was employed as a domestic servant and had a child out of wedlock, and for some time had an informal relationship with a man named James Garrett.

Garrett began attending meetings of the London Spiritual Alliance around 1920-1921, using the name "Mrs. Garrett" although she was unmarried. Following a breakup with her domestic partner, her commitment to the Alliance became more serious, although Garrett's account of this period remains confused. In 1930, she claimed to channel the words of Arthur Conan Doyle and the crew of the R101, which significantly raised her profile. In 1931 she was invited to the United States by the American Society for Psychical Research and performed experiments for various psychical researchers in both America and Europe until the 1950s. Garrett was not a proponent of the spiritualist hypothesis and attributed her mediumship not to spirits but to the activity of a "magnetic field". Garrett wrote "In all my years' professional mediumship I have had no "sign", "test" or slightest evidence to make me believe I have contacted another world." She considered that her trance controls were personalities from her subconscious and admitted to the parapsychologist Peter Underwood, "I do not believe in individual survival after death".

The main trance controls of Garrett were known as "Abdul Latif" and "Uvani". In 1934 Garrett voluntarily submitted herself to an analysis by the psychologist William Brown and by word-association tests by the psychical researcher Whately Carington. The tests had proven that her controls were secondary personalities from her subconscious, organised around repressed material. The psychical researcher Hereward Carrington with his colleagues also examined the trance controls in many séance sittings. They utilised instruments to measure everything from galvanic skin response to blood pressure and concluded from the results that the controls were nothing more than secondary personalities of Garrett and there was no spirits or telepathy involved.

Garrett regarded her trance controls as "principles of the subconscious" formed by her own inner needs. She founded the Parapsychology Foundation in New York City in 1951.

Garrett founded the Creative Age Press publishing house, which she later sold to Farrar, Straus and Young. She also edited Tomorrow magazine.

Garrett died after a long illness on 15 September 1970, in Nice, France.

== Clairvoyance tests ==
Garrett took part in "clairvoyance" tests. One of the tests was organized by Joseph Rhine at Duke University in 1933 which involved Zener cards. Certain symbols that were placed on the cards and sealed in an envelope, and participants were asked to guess their contents. She performed poorly and later criticized the tests by claiming the cards lacked a psychic energy called "energy stimulus" and that she could not perform clairvoyance to order.

The parapsychologist Samuel Soal and his colleagues tested Garrett in May 1937. Most of the experiments were carried out in the Psychological Laboratory at the University College London. A total of over 12,000 guesses were recorded but Garrett failed to produce above chance level. In his report Soal wrote:

In the case of Mrs. Eileen Garrett we fail to find the slightest confirmation of Dr. J. B. Rhine's remarkable claims relating to her alleged powers of extra-sensory perception. Not only did she fail when I took charge of the experiments, but she failed equally when four other carefully trained experimenters took my place.

The experiments of Rhine and the Zener cards used in the 1930s were discovered to contain procedural errors and flaws, the results have not replicated when the experiments have been conducted in other laboratories. Science writer Terence Hines has written "the methods used to prevent subjects from gaining hints and clues as to the design on the cards were far from adequate." Leonard Zusne and Warren Jones wrote "the keeping of records in Rhine's experiments was inadequate. Sometimes, the subject would help with the checking of his or her calls against the order of cards. In some long-distance telepathy experiments, the order of the cards passed through the hands of the percipient before it got from Rhine to the agent."

== Controversy ==
On 7 October 1930 it was claimed by spiritualists that Garrett made contact with the spirit of Herbert Carmichael Irwin at a séance held with Harry Price at the National Laboratory of Psychical Research two days after the R101 disaster, while attempting to contact the then recently deceased Arthur Conan Doyle, and discussed possible causes of the accident. The event "attracted worldwide attention", thanks to the presence of a reporter. Major Oliver Villiers, a friend of Brancker, Scott, Irwin, Colmore and others aboard the airship, participated in further séances with Garrett, at which he claimed to have contacted both Irwin and other victims. Price did not come to any definite conclusion about Garrett and the séances:

It is not my intention to discuss if the medium were really controlled by the discarnate entity of Irwin, or whether the utterances emanated from her subconscious mind or those of the sitters. "Spirit" or "trance personality" would be equally interesting explanations – and equally remarkable. There is no real evidence for either hypothesis. But it is not my intention to discuss hypotheses, but rather to put on record the detailed account of a remarkably interesting and thought-provoking experiment.

In 1978, paranormal writer John G. Fuller wrote a book claiming that Irwin had spoken through Garrett. This claim has been questioned. Magician John Booth analyzed the mediumship of Garrett and the paranormal claims of R101 and considered her to be a fraud. According to Booth, Garrett's notes and writings show she followed the building of the R101 and she may have been given aircraft blueprints from a technician from the aerodrome.

However, Melvin Harris, a researcher who studied the original scripts from the case, wrote that no secret accomplice was needed as the information described in Garrett's séances were "either commonplace, easily absorbed bits and pieces, or plain gobbledegook. The so-called secret information just doesn't exist." Harris discovered that the original scripts of the séances did not contain any secret information and spiritualist writers such as Fuller had fabricated and misinterpreted content from these scripts. When experts and veteran pilots were shown the scripts they declared the information to be incorrect and technically empty.

Archie Jarman, who had interviewed witnesses and wrote an 80,000-word report on the case, concluded that the information from the séance was valueless, and that one should "best forget the psychic side of R-101; it's a dead duck— absolutely!"

== Publications ==
- My Life as a Search for the Meaning of Mediumship (1938)
- Telepathy in Search of a Lost Faculty (1941)
- Adventures in the Supernormal: A Personal Memoir (1949)
- The Sense and Nonsense of Prophecy (1950)
- Does Man Survive Death (1951)
- Many Voices: The Autobiography of a Medium (1968)
