= Allonne, Oise =

Allonne
- Commune
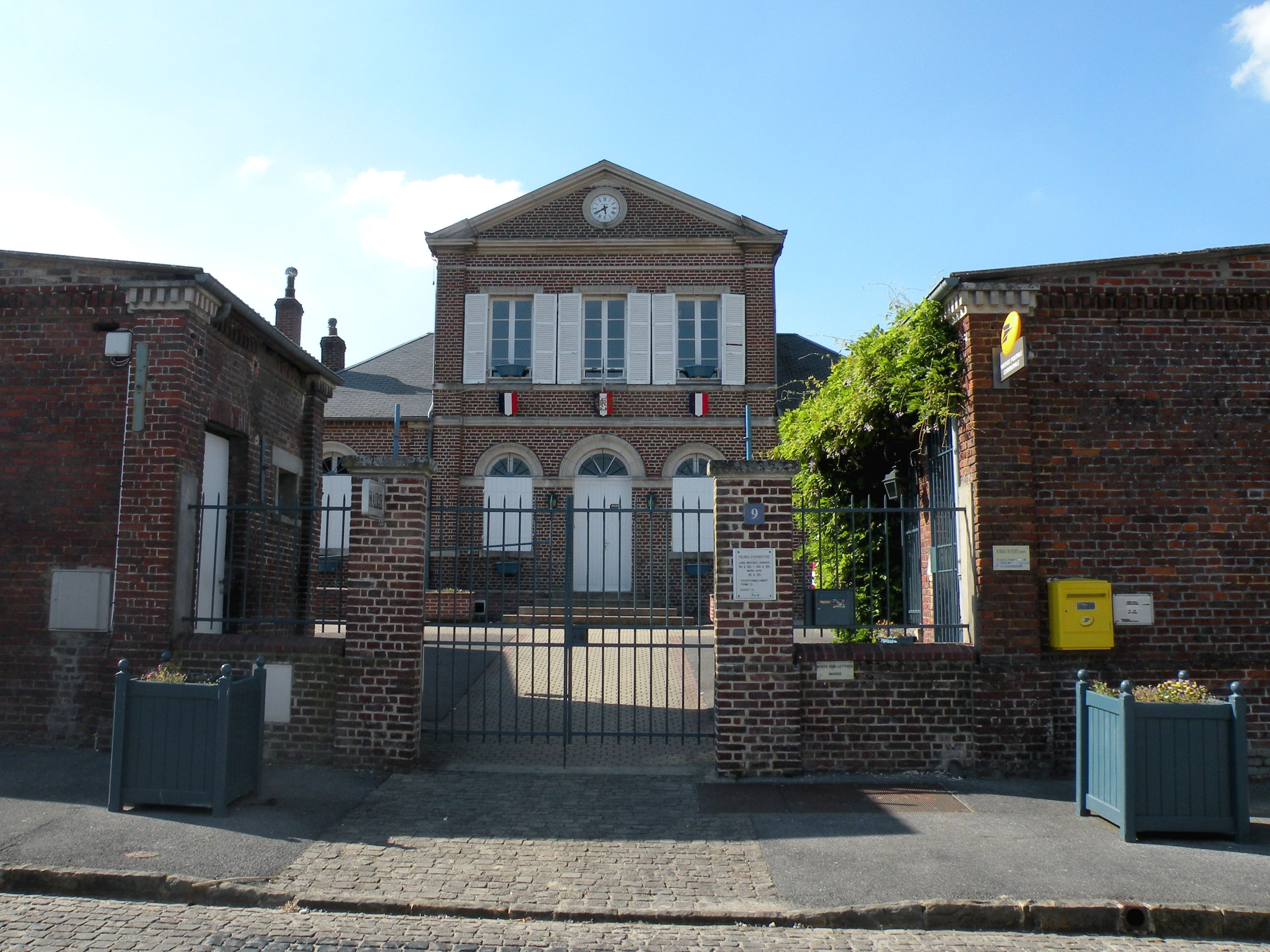
- The town hall in Allonne
- Location of Allonne
- Location within France Location within Hauts-de-France
- Coordinates: 49°24′16″N 2°06′46″E
- Country: France
- Region: Hauts-de-France
- Department: Oise
- Arrondissement: Beauvais
- Canton: Beauvais-2
- Intercommunality: CA Beauvaisis

Government
  - Mayor (2021–2026): Patrice Haezebrouck
- Area^{1}: 15.45 km^{2} (5.97 sq mi)
- Elevation: 58 m (190 ft)
- Highest elevation: 161 m (528 ft)
- Lowest elevation: 53 m (174 ft)
- Population (2023): 1,767
  - Density: 114.4/km^{2} (296.2/sq mi)
- Time zone: UTC+01:00 (CET)
  - Summer (DST): UTC+02:00 (CEST)
- INSEE/Postal code: 60009 /60000
- ^{1} French Land Register data, which excludes lakes, ponds, glaciers > 1 km^{2} (0.386 sq mi or 247 acres) and river estuaries.

Allonne (French pronunciation: [alɔn]) is a commune in the Oise department in northern France.

== History ==
The R101 British airship crashed during the night of October 5, 1930, in Allonne during its maiden overseas voyage, between London and Karachi, killing 48 people.

== Population ==
Historical population
Year	Pop.	±% p.a.
1968	923	—
1975	1,013	+1.34%
1982	1,055	+0.58%
1990	1,199	+1.61%
1999	1,258	+0.54%
2007	1,471	+1.97%
2012	1,566	+1.26%
2017	1,572	+0.08%
2023	1,767	+1.97%
Source: INSEE

== See also ==
- Communes of the Oise department
