= Tomorrow (New York magazine) =

American magazine (1941–1960s)

Tomorrow was an American magazine published by Creative Age Press from 1941 until the 1960s.

The magazine specialized in parapsychology and mystical subjects. It also included literary contributions as well as articles on current events. For example, the March 1943 issue (Volume 2, No. 7) focused on Latin American authors, and featured a lengthy poem by Pablo Neruda: The Seventh of November. In the same issue, American Educator and author John Erskine contributed an article on The People's Theatre. The founding editor, Eileen J. Garrett, was one of America's best known mediums. Associate editors included Mercedes de Acosta.

In the February 1950 issue, writer and editor Gorham Munson, wrote about what he called the "Black Sheep Philosophers"--G.I. Gurdjieff, A.R. Orage, and P.D. Ouspensky. Munson studied personally with Orage for more than ten years, and occasionally met with Gurdjieff.

In a 1963 issue, Frithjof Schuon contributed an article on "Some Notes on the Shamanism of North America", and in 1964 he wrote "Reflections on Ideological Sentimentalism".
