= Vincent Crane Richmond =

British military officer, engineer, and airship designer

- Born: 21 January 1893; Dalston, London, England
- Died: 5 October 1930 (aged 37); France
- Military career
- Allegiance: United Kingdom
- Branch: Royal Naval Air Service; Royal Air Force
- Service years: 1915–1930
- Rank: Lieutenant Colonel
- Nickname: Dope
- Awards: Officer of the Order of the British Empire

Lieutenant-Colonel Vincent Crane Richmond OBE FRAeS. (1893–1930) was an English engineer and airship designer. He served first with the Royal Naval Air Service then the Royal Air Force. He was notable as designer of the Royal Airship Works R101 airship in which he died on 5 October 1930 when it crashed over France on its maiden voyage.

== Life ==
Richmond was born 21 January 1893 at Dalston, London, the son of Joshua and Florence Mary Richmond (née Crane). His father was a mechanical engineer and model maker. Richmond was educated at the Royal College of Science. Richmond lived much of his early life in East london later residing in Harrow-on-the-Hill, Middlesex, London. He became an engineer for Messrs. S. Pearson & Sons working on physical and structural problems in connection with dock construction.

In 1915 he joined the Royal Naval Air Service and until the end of the War was principally engaged on the construction of non-rigid airships where he worked on developing envelopes for non-rigid airships, inventing a technique for doping linen before stretching it over the airframe, earning him the nickname "Dope".

In 1920 he went to Germany with the Military Inter-Allied Commission of Control and during part of the time was in charge of the Naval Sub-Commission for the surrender of airships and seaplanes. In 1921 he joined the Airship Research Department of the Air Ministry and until 1923 was engaged on research into problems connected with rigid airship construction. From 1923 to 1924, during the cessation of airship activity in Britain, he was in charge of the Material and Research Branch under the Director of Research, Air Ministry and since 1923 had been Lecturer in Airship Design and construction at the Imperial College of Science. He joined the Royal Airship Works in 1924 as Officer in Charge of Design and Research, becoming responsible for the design of the R101. Richmond was a contemporary of Neville Shute Norway who worked on the design for the rival Vickers R100 design.

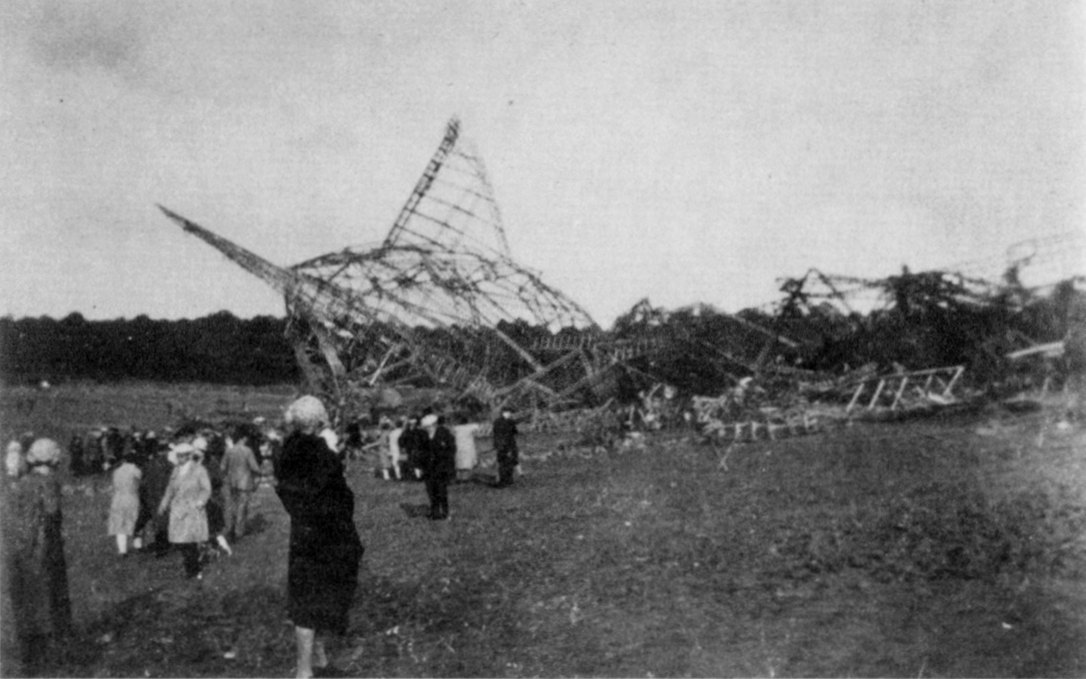
The wreckage of R101.

After a number of trial flights the R101 set out on its maiden voyage from England to India. The airship was wrecked near Beauvais, France, early on 5 October 1930, having struck the ground and caught fire. Richmond was one of the forty-eight people killed in the accident. National feeling surrounding the disaster was huge; the funeral procession through London was watched by thousands. The bodies were then taken by special train to Bedford to be laid to rest in a communal grave in Cardington cemetery. Richmond's diaries, kept during the trials of the R101, were substantially quoted in the report of the inquiry into the accident and noted a number of concerns regarding the condition of the gasbags.

== Inventions and published papers ==
Richmond, along with colleagues was responsible for at least 16 patents relating to the manufacturing of airships:

- 1921 – "Gas stopping lining for use in aircraft and fixing for same" US 1378804 A
- 1923 – "Transverse frame for rigid airships" US 1780041 A with George Herbert Scott
- 1924 – "Construction of rigid airships" US 1656830 A
- 1926 – Gasbag construction
- "Some Modern Developments in Rigid Airship Construction", a paper read at the Spring Meetings of the Sixty Ninth Session of the Royal Institution of Naval Architects, 30 March 1928.
