= List of British airships =

The first British airship; Spencer's Airship No. 1 in the summer of 1902

Airship development in the United Kingdom lagged behind that of Germany and France. The first British designed and built airship was constructed by Stanley Spencer, and on 22 September 1902 was flown 30 miles (48 km) from Crystal Palace, London to Ruislip, carrying an advertisement for baby food. A series of more practical airships was constructed by Ernest Willows, the "Willows Number 1" making its first flight near Cardiff on 5 August 1905. The Royal Navy realised that airships similar to Ferdinand von Zeppelin's designs could be of great use and in 1909 ordered construction of a rigid airship. This was completed in 1911 but was wrecked while leaving the hangar before it had flown. Meanwhile, the British Army's School of Ballooning, later the Air Battalion Royal Engineers, acquired a small fleet of semi-rigid and non-rigid airships for observation purposes; they were taken over by the Royal Navy on the creation of the Royal Naval Air Service in 1914. A large number of rigid and non-rigid airships were mainly used to counter the U-Boat campaign in World War I. Interest in military airships declined at the end of the war, but some success in the commercial field inspired the Imperial Airship Scheme; however, the disastrous crash of the R101 in 1930 ended serious government and commercial interest in airships. Since the 1970s, there have been persistent efforts to revive a British airship industry, using new designs, materials and technologies.

== Semi-rigid and non-rigid airships ==
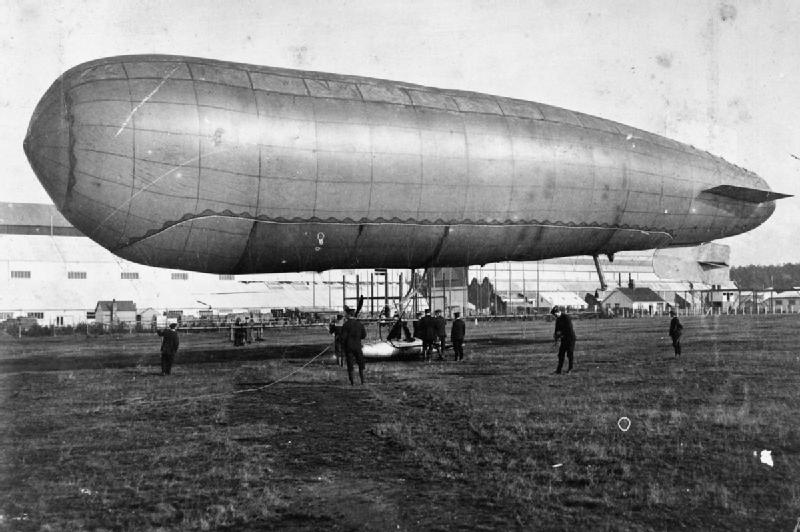
Willows Airship Number 4 was purchased by the Royal Navy in 1912

=== Spencer airships ===
Spencer's Airship No. 1 - "The Mellin Airship" (after the advertising that it carried); first flight, 22 September 1902
Spencer's Airship No. 2 - 1903

=== Beedle airship ===
Designed and flown by Captain William Beedle in 1903.

=== Willows airships ===
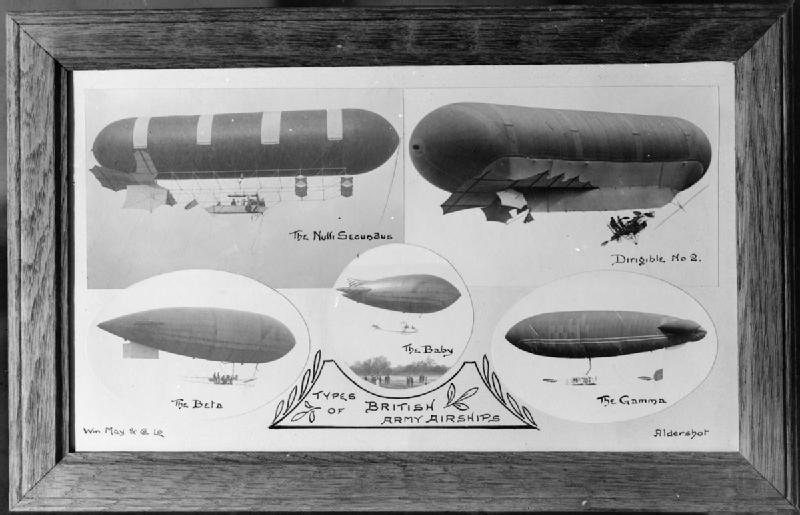
Five early British Army airships

Willows Numbers 1 to 5 - constructed by Ernest Willows from 1905.

=== British Army airships ===
- British Army Dirigible No 1 - or "Nulli Secundus"; first flight, 10 September 1907. Damaged by high wind, 10 October 1907.
- Nulli Secundus II - Nulli Secundus rebuilt with enlarged envelope. First flight 24 July 1908. Damaged on 15 August and never repaired
- "Baby" - 1909, "British Army Airship No.3"
- Beta - May 1910 (a rebuild of "Baby" with a new envelope)
- Beta II - 1912 (a rebuild of Beta), served with Royal Navy as "HMA No. 17"
- No.2A - 1910, 150 feet long, with a gas capacity of 75,000 feet, powered by an 80hp British Green motor.
- Gamma - February 1910
- Gamma II - 1912 (A rebuild of Gamma)
- Delta - 1912
- Eta - August 1913. Transferred to Royal Navy, 1914.

Two French-built airships, Clément-Bayard II and the Morning Post were operated by the British Army from 1910 to 1914. The latter had been donated by the readers of a British newspaper.

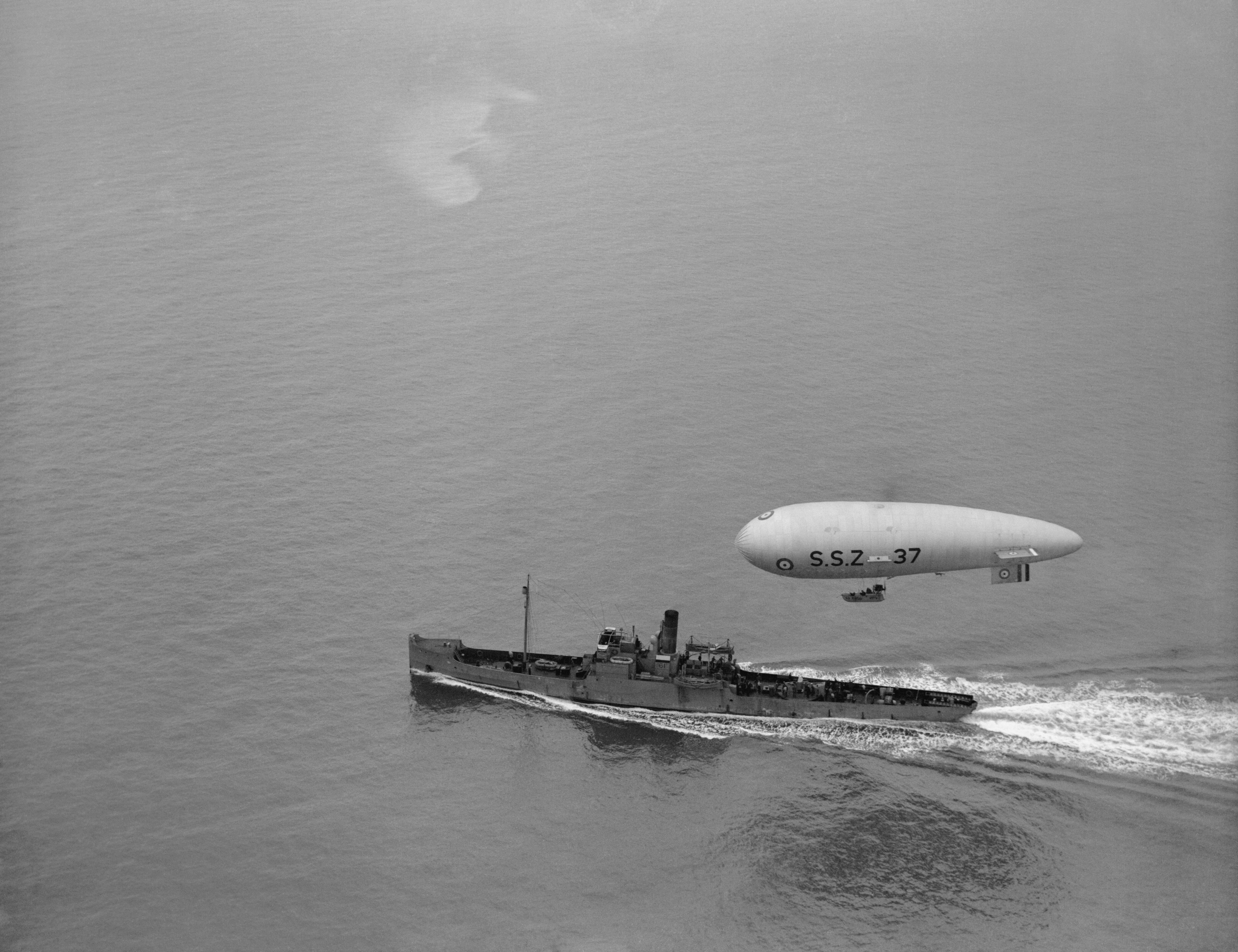
A naval SSZ airship escorts a warship during World War I

=== Royal Navy airships ===
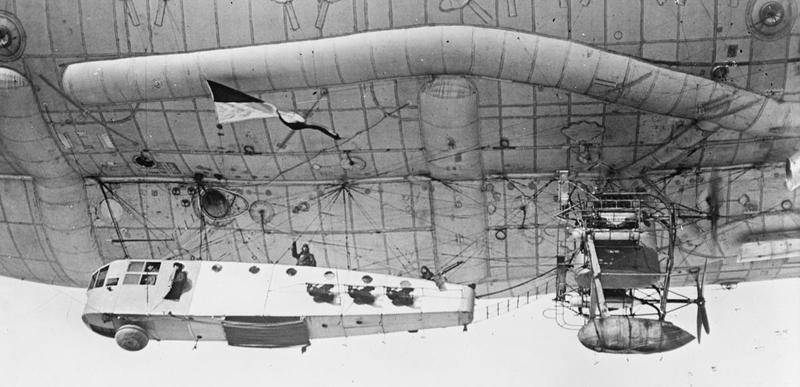
The underside of an NS class blimp

- Willows No. 4 - His Majesty's Naval Airship No. 2 - purchased in 1912
- Sea Scout (SS) class - 60 airships, the first entered service in March 1915, being a rebuild of Willows No. 4
- Coastal (C) class - 35 airships, the first entered service in March 1916, being a rebuild of a Franco-Spanish Astra-Torres airship
- Sea Scout Zero (SSZ) class - 77 airships; entered service from September 1916
- SSP (Sea Scout Pusher) class - 6 airships; entered service from January 1917
- C-Star class - 10 airships: entered service from February 1918
- North Sea (NS) class - 14 airships; entered service from March 1918
- Sea Scout Twin (SST) class - 13 airships; entered service from June 1918

=== Post World War II civilian airships ===
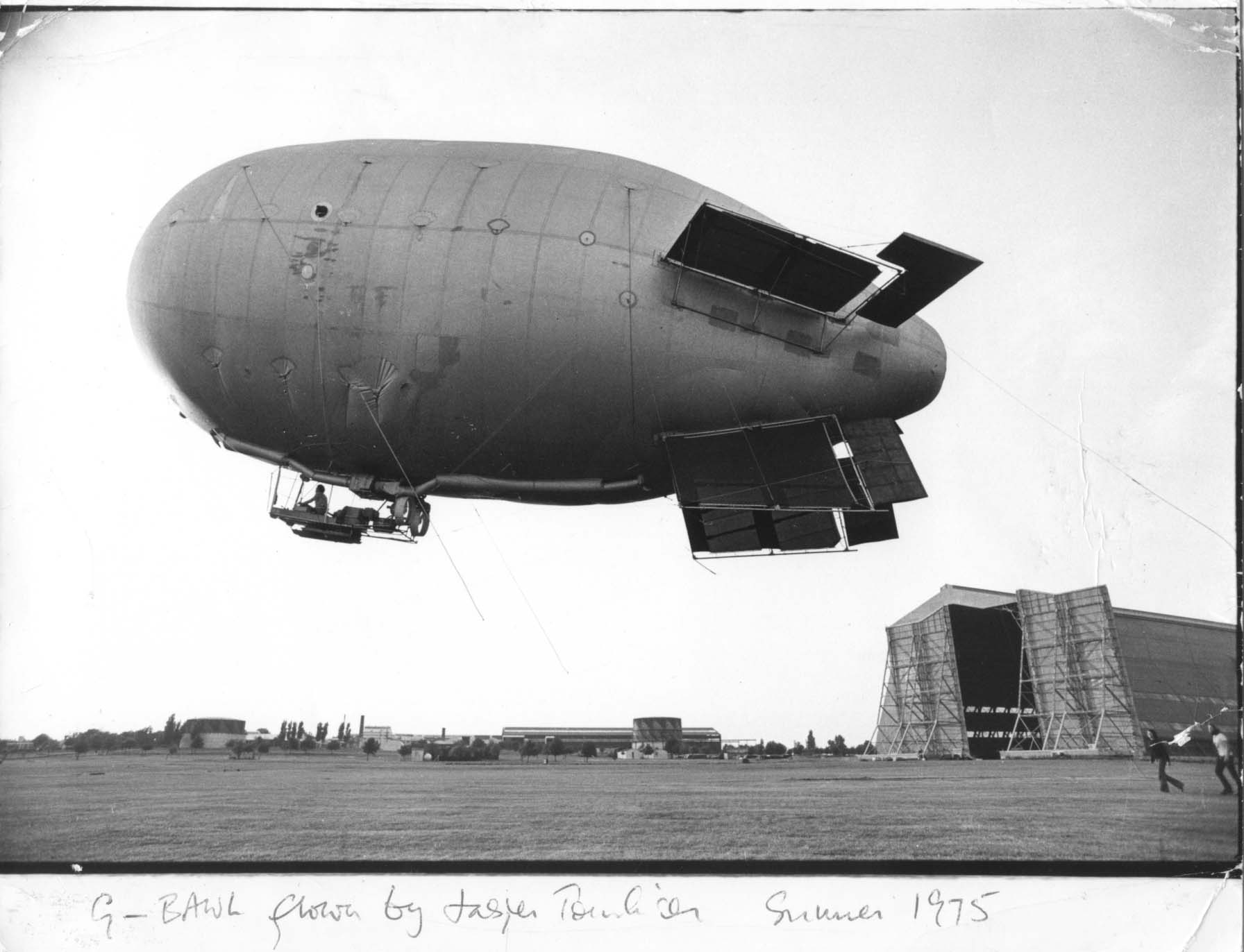
British private airship G-BAWL taking to the air in the summer of 1975 in Bedford England

Airship Club Bournemouth - first flight, 1951. Final flight, 16 August 1952

Chitty Bang Bang - first flight, 1967 semi-rigid in period style for the film Chitty Chitty Bang Bang

Santos Dumont (G-BAWL) - first flight at Cardington in 1974. A 72 foot (22 metre) non-rigid airship powered by two 20 hp Wankel engines with ducted fans - a private venture that logged 31 flying hours. The BBC made a documentary about this airship in 1974 (released in 1977) about the creation of this airship and its first flight

== Rigid airships ==
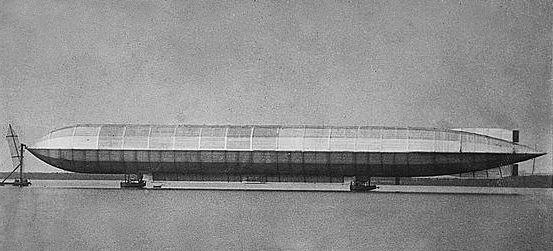
His Majesty's Airship No. 1, the "Mayfly", in 1911

- His Majesty's Airship No. 1 - also known as the Mayfly. Wrecked before her maiden flight in May 1911

No. 9rs

- HMA No. 9r - first flight 27 November 1916. Scrapped in June 1918
- HMA No. 14r - Not Built
- HMA No. 15r - Not Built

23 class airships

- No. 23r - first flight, 19 September 1917. Scrapped September 1919

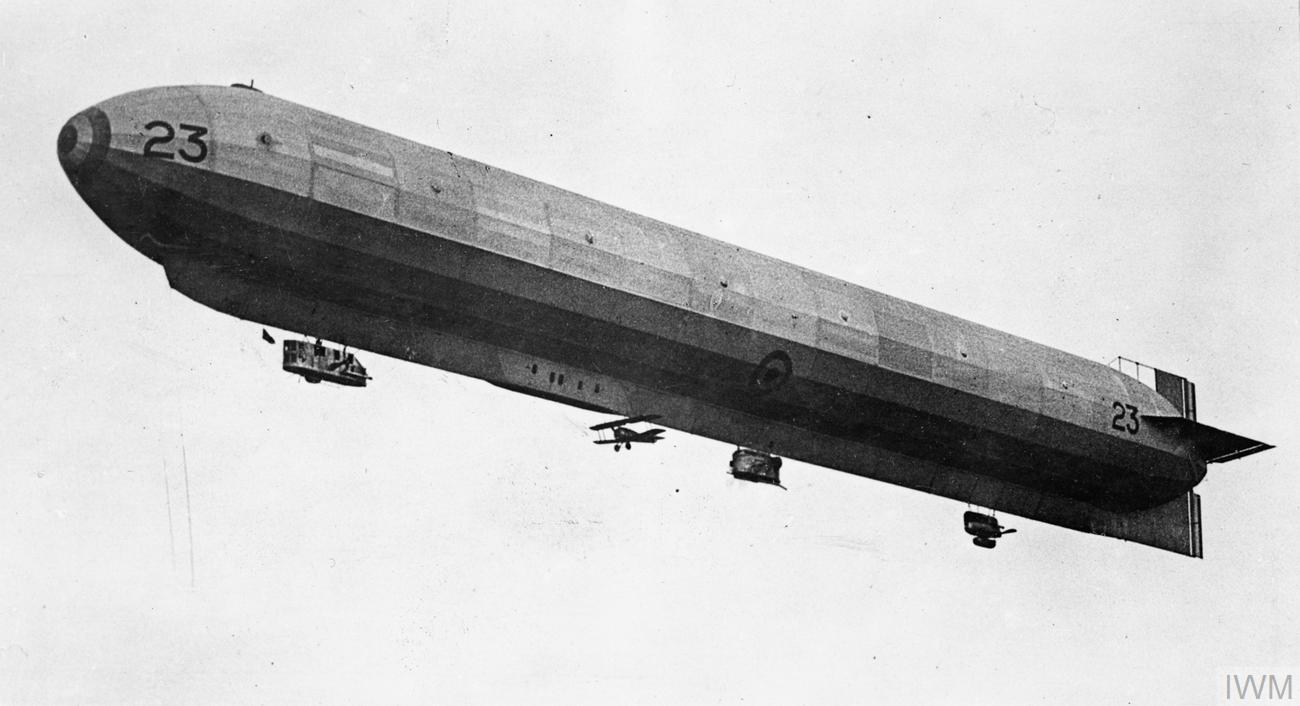
HM Airship No. 23r during experimental launches of a Sopwith Camel parasite fighter in 1918

- No. 24r - first flight 1917, scrapped 1919
- No. 25r - first flight, 14 October 1917. Scrapped September 1919
- R26 - first flight 1918. Scrapped following accident, March 1919

R23X-class airships

- R27 - commissioned 29 June 1918. Destroyed by hangar fire, 16 August 1918
- R28 - Not completed
- R29 - commissioned 20 June 1918. Scrapped, October 1919
- R30 - Not completed

R31-class airships

- R31 - first flight, July 1918. Scrapped February 1919
- R32 - first flight, 3 September 1919. Tested to destruction, 1920

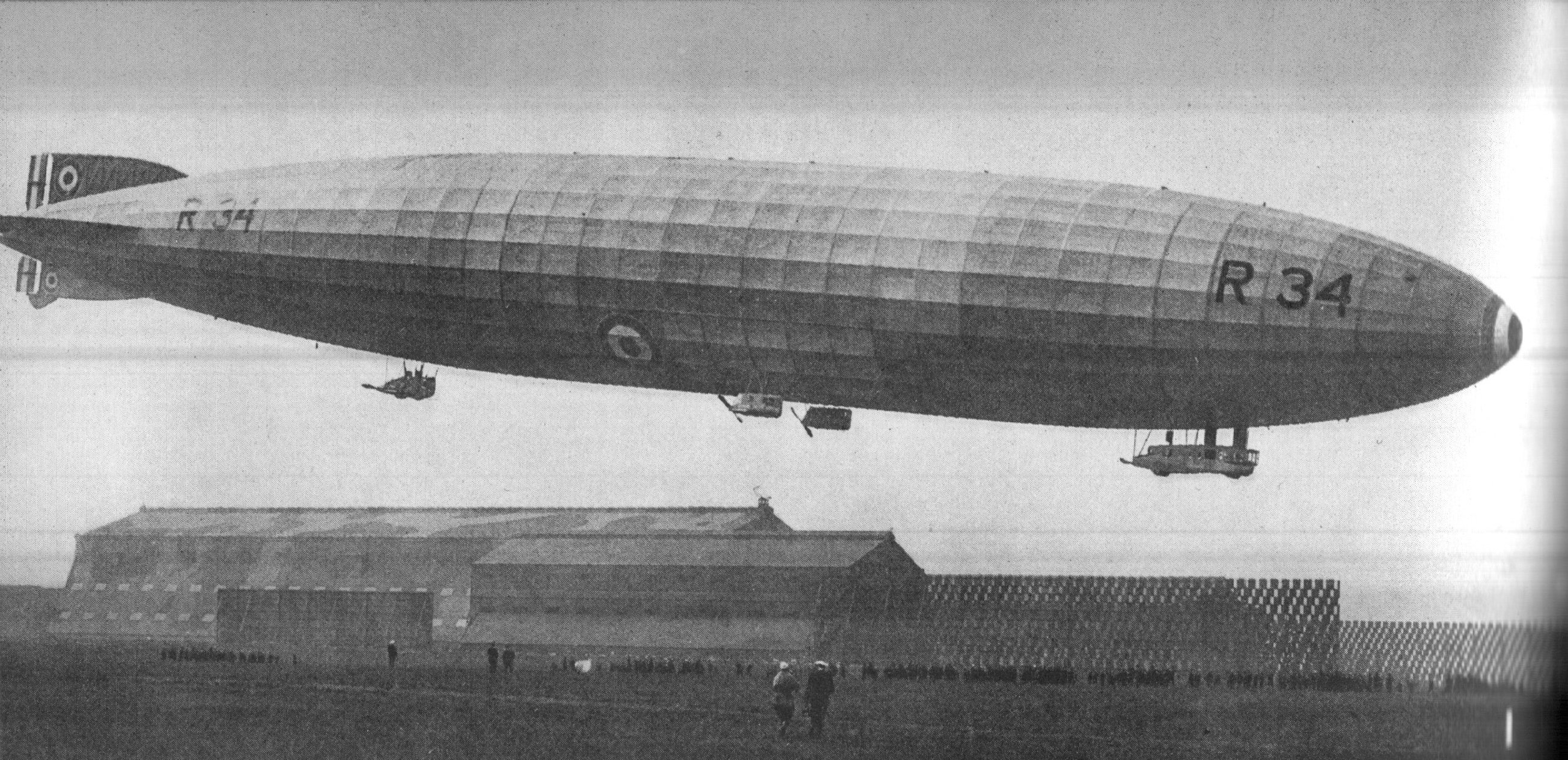
The R34 in 1919

R33-class airships

- R33 (G-FAAG) - first flight, 6 March 1919. Scrapped March 1928
- R34 - first flight, 14 March 1919. Scrapped after storm damage, 27 January 1921
- R35 - Not completed

R36 class airships

- R36 (G-FAAF) - first flight, 1 April 1921. Accidental damage on 21 June 1921 and never repaired
- R37 - Not completed

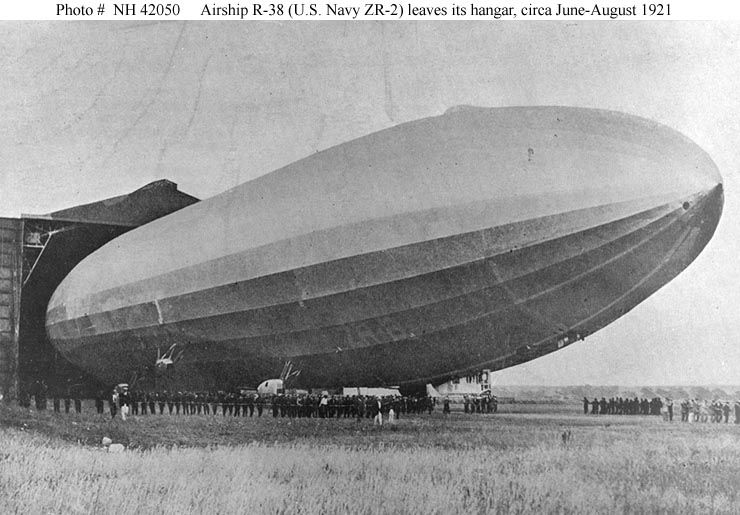
The R38 leaving the hangar at Cardington in June 1921.

R38 class airships

- R38 - first flight, 23 June 1921. Sold to US Navy as ZR-2 but broke up in flight over Hull on 23 August 1921
- R39 - Not completed
- R40 - Not completed
- R41 - Not built

R80 class airships

- R80 - first flight, 19 July 1920. Tested to destruction, 1925

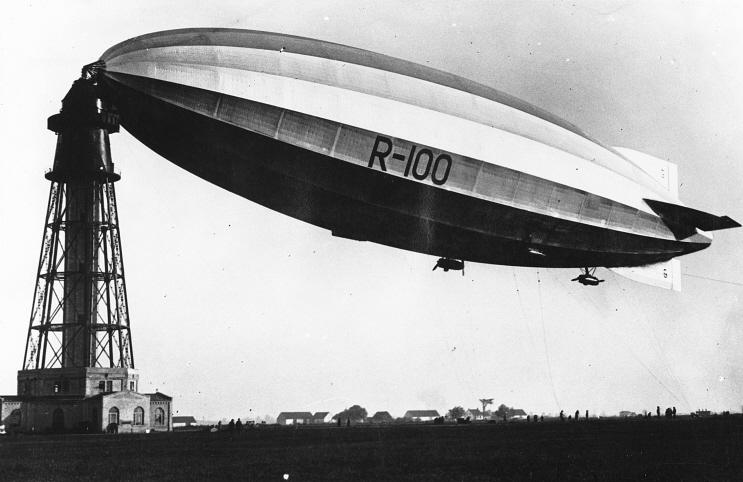
The R100 moored near Quebec in Canada, 1930

- R81 - Not Built

Imperial Airship Scheme airships

- R100 (G-FAAV) - first flight, 16 December 1929. Scrapped November 1931
- R101 (G-FAAW) - first flight, 14 October 1929. Crashed in France, 5 October 1930
- R102 - cancelled before construction, August 1931

In addition to these airships, there were the following uncompleted projects: Vickers Types I - IV, Admiralty 'Y' Class, R103 and R104

== Modern airship projects ==
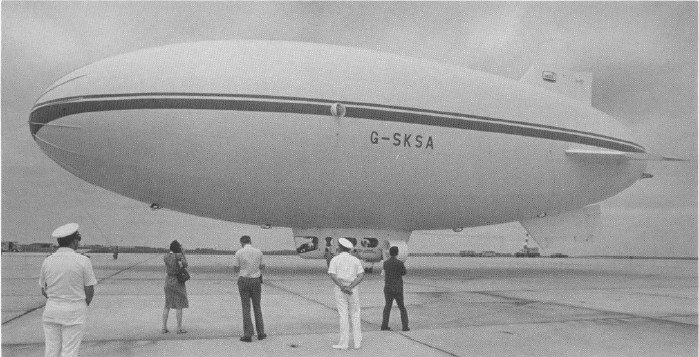
A British Skyship500 being demonstrated to the US Navy in 1983

- Aerospace Developments/Airship Developments airships
  - AD500 - first flight at Cardington, 3 February 1979. Damaged by high winds, 8 March 1979 and never repaired.
- Airship Industries airships
  - Airship Industries Skyship 500 - first flight at Cardington, 28 September 1981. Four other Skyships were completed, three of them abroad in the US, Canada and Japan.
  - Airship Industries Skyship 600 - first flight at Cardington, 6 March 1984. Two of ten 600s were built at Cardington, the others in the US and Japan.
- Advanced Technologies Group (ATG) airships
  - Advanced Technologies Group AT-10 - one prototype completed and flown
  - SkyCat - proposed hybrid airship
  - Skykitten - 12 metre long 1:6 scale flying demonstrator of Skycat
- Hybrid Air Vehicles

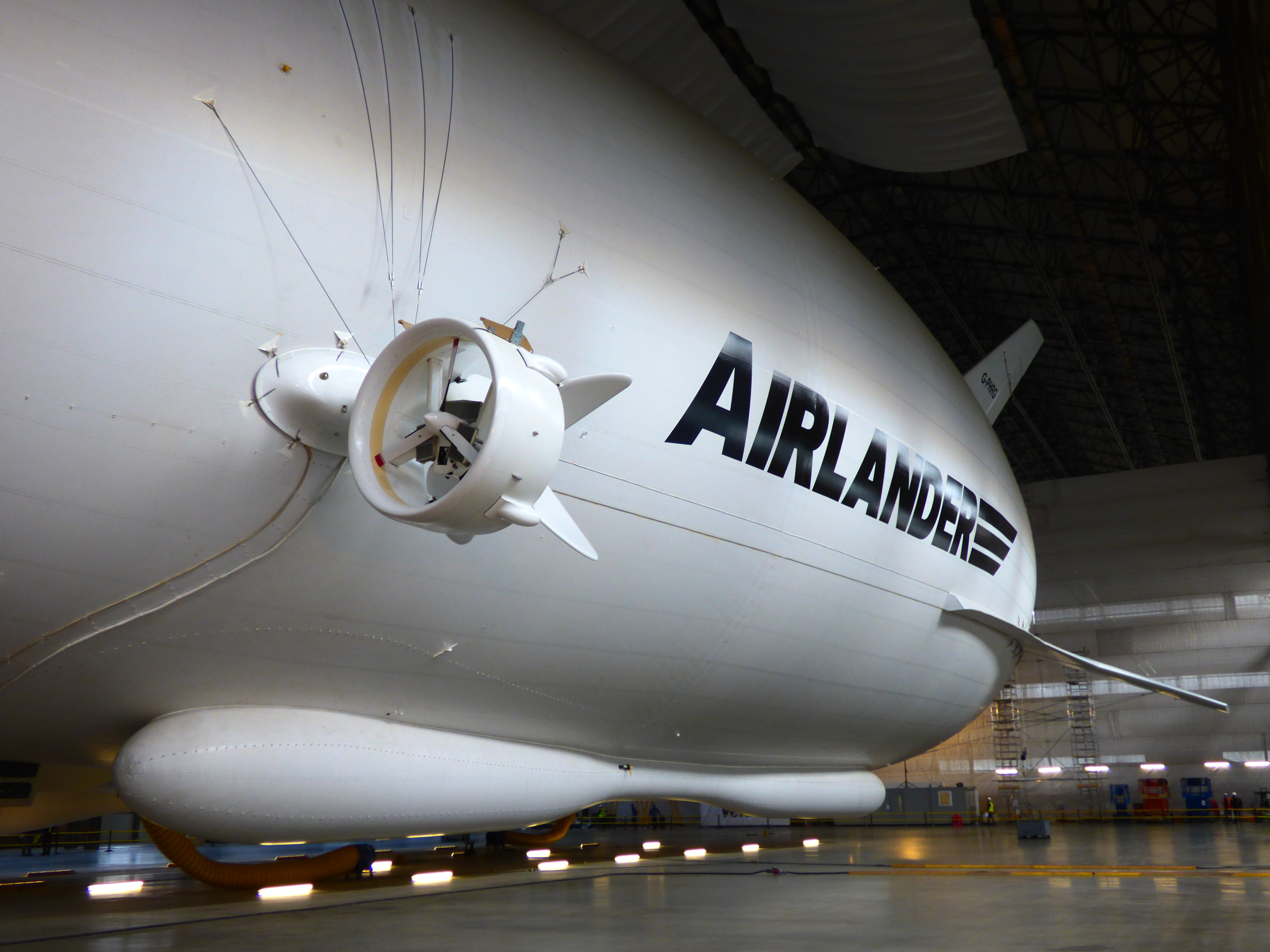
The Airlander 10 at Cardington.

  - HAV-3 - scale demonstrator based on Skycat for the US Army's Long Endurance Multi-intelligence Vehicle (LEMV) project; first flight, September 2008 at Cardington.
  - Hybrid Air Vehicles HAV 304 Airlander 10 - 91 metre long, 38,000 cubic metre developmental prototype for the LEMV project. first flight on 8 August 2012 at Joint Base McGuire-Dix-Lakehurst. Sold back to Hybrid Air Vehicles on the cancellation of the project in 2013 and returned to Cardington. Converted for civilian use as the Airlander 10. During a test flight from Cardington on 24 August 2016, the Airlander's mooring line fouled a power cable, resulting in it striking the ground hard, damaging the cockpit. In April 2017, it was reported that repairs and modifications, including the addition of inflatable landing "feet", were complete and that the Airlander was ready to resume test flights. On 18 November 2017, the Airlander broke free from its moorings, activating a safety system that deflated the hull. Subsequently, HAV announced that the prototype would be retired due to "very considerable damage" sustained in the incident, pending the development of an improved replacement. A redesigned Airlander 10 was announced in January 2020, with new gondola, nose and tail sections, extending the overall length to 98 metres (322 ft). A research project to power the aircraft with electric motors was undertaken with the University of Nottingham. The company hoped to have the improved Airlander flying by 2024.
  - Airlander 50 - projected larger development of the HAV304, intended to have a 50 tonne payload.
