= R100 =

British rigid airship in service 1929-1930

HM Airship R100
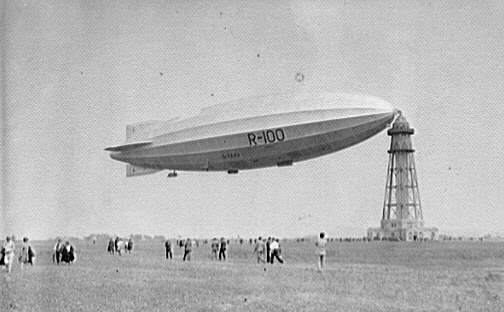
- R100 at its mooring mast in St. Hubert, Quebec, Canada, July 1930

General information
- Role: Passenger airship
- National origin: United Kingdom
- Manufacturer: Vickers
- Number built: 1
- Registration: G-FAAV

History
- First flight: 16 December 1929

His Majesty's Airship R100 was a privately designed and built British rigid airship made as part of a two-ship competition to develop a commercial airship service for use on British Empire routes as part of the Imperial Airship Scheme. The other airship, the R101, was built by the British Air Ministry, but both airships were funded by the Government.

R100 was built by the Airship Guarantee Company, a specially created subsidiary of the armaments firm Vickers-Armstrongs, led by Commander Dennis Burney. The design team was headed by Barnes Wallis, later famous for his invention of the bouncing bomb. The design team also included Nevil Shute Norway as the senior stress engineer. (Note: Norway later became famous as a novelist, writing under the name of Nevil Shute; he was critical of the designers of the R38 and R101 in his autobiography Slide Rule: Autobiography of an Engineer)

R100 first flew in December 1929. It made a series of trial flights and a successful return crossing of the Atlantic in July–August 1930, but following the crash of R101 in October 1930 the Imperial Airship Scheme was terminated and R100 was broken up for scrap.

== Background ==
R100 was built as part of a British government programme to develop airships to provide passenger and mail transport between Britain and the countries of the British Empire, including India, Australia and Canada. This had its origin in Dennistoun Burney's 1922 proposal for a civil airship development programme to be subsidised by the Government and carried out by a specially established subsidiary of Vickers. When the general election of 1923 brought Ramsay MacDonald’s Labour administration to power, the new Air Minister, Lord Thomson formulated the Imperial Airship Scheme in its place. This called for the building of two experimental airships: one, R101, to be designed and constructed under the direction of the Air Ministry, and the other, R100, to be built by the Vickers subsidiary under a fixed price contract.

== Design and development ==
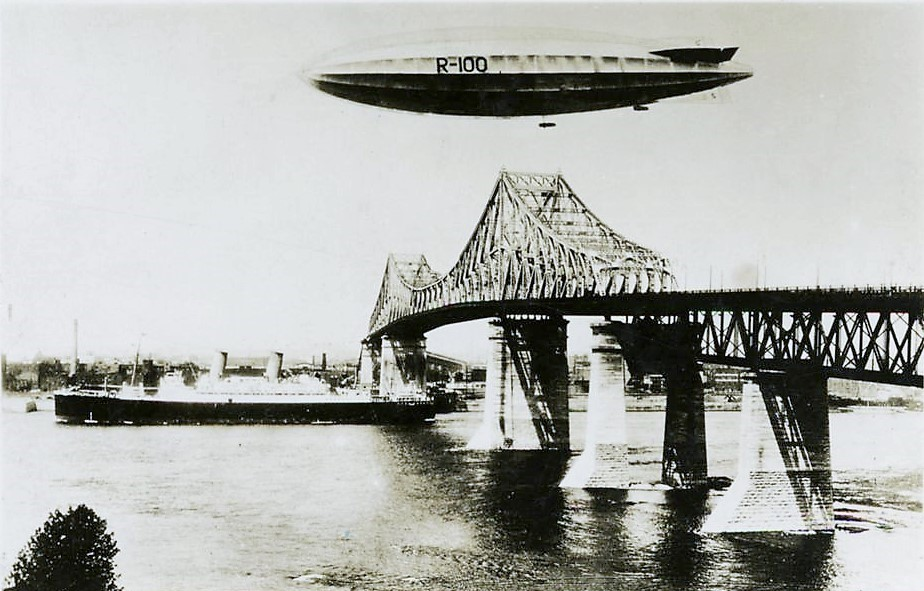
Composite image representing R100 passing over the Jacques Cartier Bridge in Montreal, August 1930

R100 was constructed at the former RNAS Air Station Howden in Yorkshire, a remote location 3 mi (5 km) from Howden and 25 mi (40 km) from Hull. Design work began in 1925 while at the same time the somewhat rundown site was put in order and a hydrogen-generating plant installed.

The specially established subsidiary of Vickers, the Airship Guarantee Company, faced substantial difficulties. The contract for R100's construction was a fixed price one and it was obvious from very early on that the project would incur a loss, and so economies were made; for instance, only a dozen machine tools were in use for construction of the airship. There were also difficulties in finding skilled workers due to the remoteness of the location, and a large proportion of the workers were local people who had to be trained. Conditions in the unheated airship shed were also poor: the roof leaked, ice formed on the girders in winter, and condensation caused corrosion of the airship's duralumin structure, so that the girders had to be varnished. For three years the assembly work was close behind that of the designers, and the progress of the design work was the determining factor in speed of construction.

=== Airframe ===
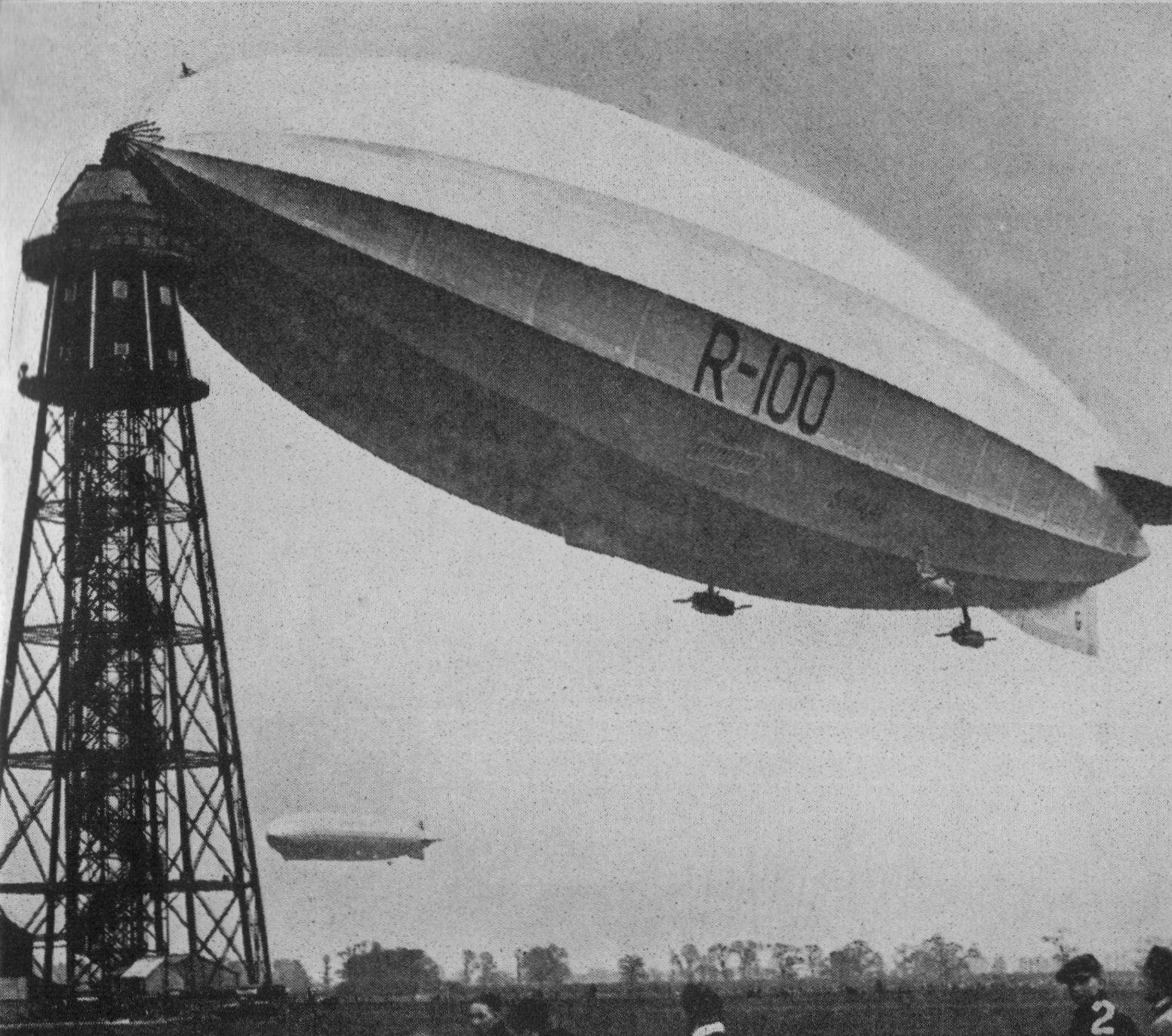
R100 at Cardington, April 1930. The German Graf Zeppelin is seen in the background.

Since wind tunnel tests showed that a 16-side transverse section had about the same drag as a circular one, both R100 and R101 used a smaller number of longitudinal girders than previous airships to simplify stress calculations. Even so, the calculations for the transverse frames required hand computation that took two or three months to produce a solution for each frame. The thoroughness of the stressing calculations was a consequence of new Air Ministry criteria for the strengths required of airships, formulated after the catastrophic structural failure of R38 in 1921. Fewer longitudinal girders resulted in larger unsupported panels of fabric in the envelope, and flight trials were to prove that the R100's covering was barely adequate. The envelope of R101 was also unsatisfactory and a failure in its cover was possibly a cause of its crash.

Barnes Wallis created the frame of the airship using only 11 standard components. The 16 longitudinal girders were formed of three tubes each, formed from strips of Duralumin wound into a helix and riveted together. These connected 15 polygonal transverse frames, which were held in shape by wire bracing connected to a central longitudinal girder running the length of the ship. A further consequence of the new rules for airframe stress design was that a new way of harnessing the lifting force of the gasbags had to be found. Wallis's solution to this problem later led to his innovative geodesic airframe fuselage and wing design for the Wellesley, Wellington, Warwick and Windsor bombers.

The elevators were aerodynamically balanced but the rudders were unbalanced. When the designers learned that R101 had been fitted with servo motors at a substantial cost in weight and money they thought that they had made a mistake and rechecked their calculations. They eventually concluded that their calculations had been correct: when R100 was flown the controls proved both light and effective, and its control characteristics were compared favourably with those of R101 by Nöel Atherstone, First Officer of R101. R100 was built suspended from the roof of its shed. The individual transverse frames were assembled horizontally then lifted up and slung from roof-mounted trackways before being slid into position and attached to the adjacent frames by the longitudinal girders. The ship remained suspended until the gasbags were inflated with hydrogen.

By mid-1929 the ship's structure was nearly complete and its gasbags were inflated. Following inflation of the gasbags, the outer covering of linen fabric painted with aluminium aircraft dope was put in place, and it was completed at the beginning of November. Lift and trim trials were carried out on 11 November: empty weight was 105.52 long tons (107.21 t) and gasbag volume was 5,156,000 cu ft (146,000 m^{3}), giving a standard gross lift of 156.52 long tons (159.03 t) and so a disposable lift of 51.00 long tons (51.82 t). Deducting 18 long tons (18 t) for the service load (crew, stores and ballast) this meant the weight available for fuel and payload was 33.00 long tons (33.53 t).

=== Propulsion ===
It had originally been intended to design special engines for R100 which would be fuelled by hydrogen and kerosene but after a year's work it was realised that the engine would not be developed in time and it was decided to fit the Beardmore Tornado diesel engine that was being developed for the Air Ministry for installation in R101. At an early stage the Tornado was judged unsuitable because of its weight and other problems, and Wallis settled on the use of six reconditioned Rolls-Royce Condor petrol engines even though the fuel, with its lower flash point, was considered to be a fire risk under tropical conditions. The engines were contained in three gondolas, each with one engine driving a 17 ft (5.18 m) diameter tractor propeller, a second driving a 15 ft (4.57 m) diameter pusher propeller, and a third smaller engine in the middle of the car driving a dynamo for electrical power. The engines driving the pusher propellers were fitted with a gearbox to provide reverse thrust for docking the airship.

=== Passenger and crew accommodation ===
The passenger and crew accommodation were arranged on three decks occupying a single bay of the structure and entirely contained within the airship's envelope. The lower deck contained the crew accommodation. The second deck had a dining room, which doubled as the passenger lounge, plus the kitchen, 18 four-berth passenger cabins and a gallery on either side for passengers to enjoy the view through the windows built into the skin. The third deck consisted of a gallery running around the dining room and 14 two-berth cabins.

== Operational history ==
=== First flights ===
R100 made its maiden flight in the morning of 16 December 1929. After departing Howden at 07:53, it flew slowly to York then set course for the Royal Airship Works at Cardington, Bedfordshire, running on five engines since one of the engines had to be shut down because of a cracked water jacket, and completing the mooring process at 13:40. A second flight was made the next day, with the intention of making a flight to London, but shortly after slipping the mast, a strip of fabric became detached from the lower fin, and the flight was limited to a cruise around Bedfordshire to test control response, lasting 6 hr 29 min. The following day, R100 was taken from the mast to No.2 shed at Cardington and work on modifying the wiring holding the cover in place begun: this took until 11 January 1930.

During a test on 16 January 1930, R100 achieved a speed of 81.5 mph (131.2 km/h). At speed, a problem with the outer covering became apparent: it tended to ripple and flap excessively in the form of a standing wave. During a fourth flight on 20 January, a film was taken of this phenomenon, which occurred because of the large areas of unsupported fabric; the effect is also visible in some photographs.

A further short flight was made on 20 January before an endurance flight, starting at 09:38 on 27 January when R100 slipped the mast at Cardington and ending at 15:26 on 29 January after more than 53 hours in the air. Following this flight, the airship was returned to the shed for work on the cover to be carried out. At the same time, the original reconditioned Condor IIIA engines were replaced by six new Condor IIIBs and some weight was eliminated by reducing the amount of passenger accommodation. The work was complete by the end of April, but on 24 April, R100 was caught by a gust while being walked out of the shed, damaging the tail surfaces. The wind prevented the ship being returned to the shed, so it was moored to the mast. It was not possible to return the R100 to the shed for repairs until the morning of 27 April. Repairs took longer than expected, and the airship remained in the shed until 21 May, when it made a 24-hour flight intended to test the new engine installation and modifications to the cover.

R100's contract had originally called for a demonstration flight to India. The decision to use gasoline engines resulted in a change in destination to Canada, as it was considered that a flight to the tropics with gasoline aboard would be too hazardous. Barring any difficulties, the R100 was scheduled to set off for Canada on 25 May; however, during the flight of 21 May, the conical tail section of the airship collapsed due to unexpected aerodynamic pressure, and the R100 was returned to the shed where the original tail section was replaced by a hemispherical cap designed and made by the Royal Airship Works, reducing the airship's length by 15 ft (4.6 m)

=== Transatlantic voyage to Canada ===
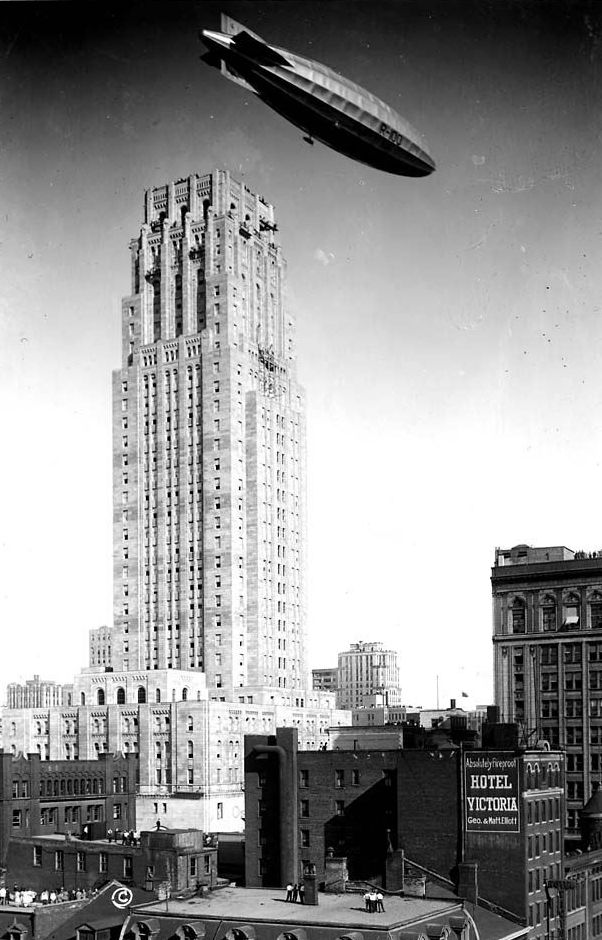
R100 over Canadian Bank of Commerce building in Toronto, Ontario, then the highest building in the British Empire (August 1930). The rippling of the airship's cover is visible.

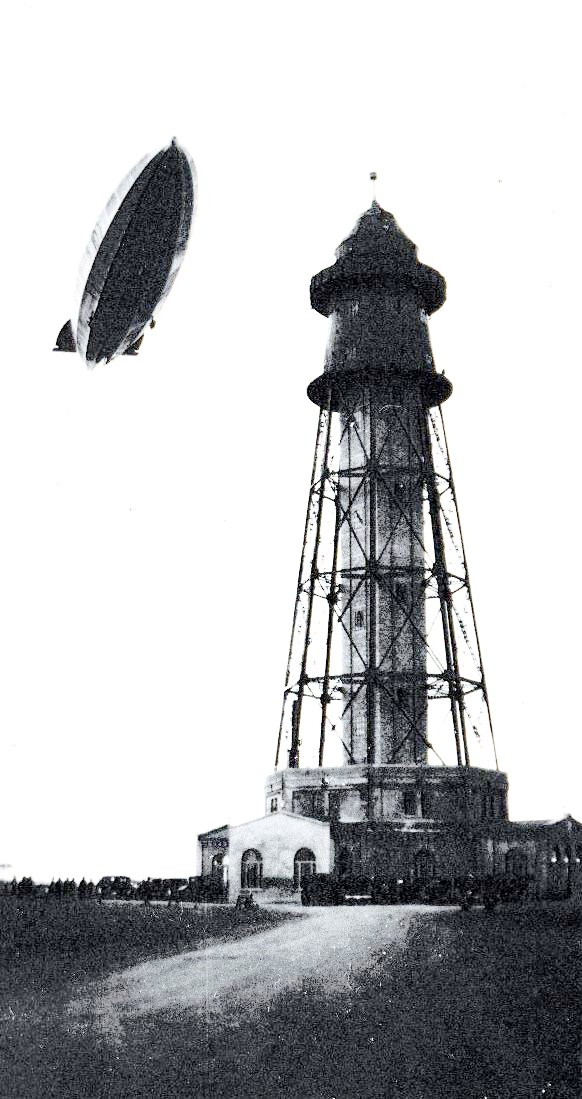
R-100 Approaching mast, St. Hubert, Quebec after flight from Toronto. Aug. 1930

Shortly before R101's flights in June 1930, the Cardington engineers suggested that the long flights of the R100 to Canada and R101 to India might be postponed until 1931 on the grounds that neither of the airships was fit to make a lengthy flight at their current developmental stage. The R100 team replied that their airship was perfectly capable of flying to Canada, and that the Canadian flight was a part of their contract. R100 departed for Canada on 29 July 1930, reaching its mooring mast at the St-Hubert, Quebec Airport (outside Montreal) in 78 hours, having covered the great circle route of 3,300 mi (5,300 km) at an average ground speed of 42 mph (68 km/h). The R100 remained in Montreal for 12 days with over 100,000 people visiting the airship each day while it was moored there, and a song was composed by La Bolduc to mock the people's fascination with the airship.

While in Canada, the R100 also made a 24-hour passenger-carrying flight to Ottawa, Toronto, and Niagara Falls. On 13 August, the airship departed Montreal on its return flight, reaching Cardington 57½ hours later. Nevil Shute Norway later suggested in Slide Rule: Autobiography of an Engineer that the success of R100's Canadian flight indirectly led to the R101 disaster. Prior to the transatlantic flight, R100's engineers could have suggested that neither airship was ready for a performance of such duration; however, when R100 returned from Canada in triumph, the R101 team had to either make the flight to India or admit defeat – which would have meant discredit with the consequent danger of losing their jobs. Shute Norway later said that R100's team "guessed that their ship (R101) was a bad airship, but did not realise" (because of secrecy at Cardington) "how bad the other ship was."

=== The end of the British airships ===
An account of the design of R100 and its claimed superiority to R101 is told in Shute Norway's Slide Rule: Autobiography of an Engineer, first published in 1954. Although flawed and not quite as overwhelmingly superior as Shute Norway implied, R100 represented the best that conventional airship technology in Britain had to offer at the time. R101 suffered in comparison partly because of its many innovations of which not all were successful and also because of the weight of its diesel engines. In lifting efficiency, both dirigibles were inferior to the smaller LZ 127 Graf Zeppelin. After R101 crashed and burned in France en route to India on 5 October 1930, the Air Ministry ordered R100 grounded. The airship remained in its shed at Cardington for over a year while three options were considered: a complete refit of R100 and continuation of tests for the eventual construction of R102; static testing of R100 and retention of about 300 staff to keep the programme "ticking over"; or retention of staff and the scrapping of the airship. In December 1931, the R100 was broken up and sold for scrap. The framework of the ship was dismantled, flattened by a steamroller and cut up into sections, and sold for less than £600 (approximately $2,720)

== Specifications (as first flight) ==
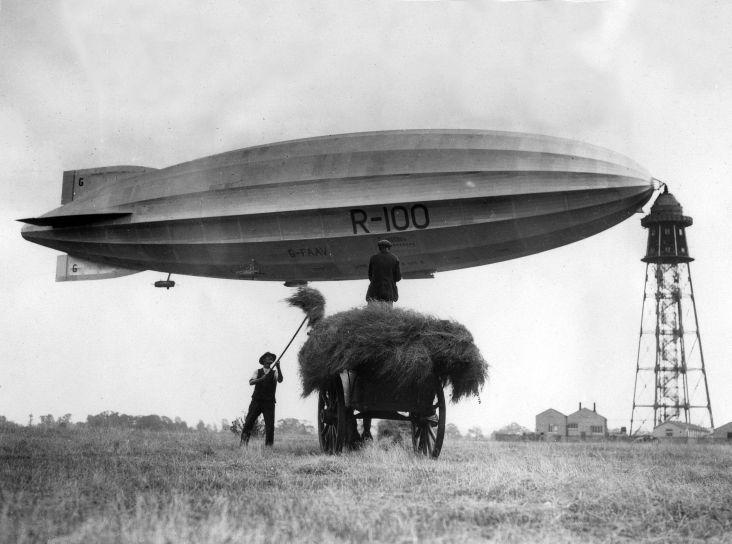
R100 at Cardington mooring mast

Data from Masefield

General characteristics

- Crew: 37
- Capacity: 100
- Length: 719 ft 9.5 in (219 m)
- Diameter: 133 ft 4 in (41 m)
- Volume: 5,156,000 cu ft (146,000 m^{3})
- Empty weight: 236,365 lb (107,215 kg)
- Useful lift: 350,607 lb (159,400 kg)
- Powerplant: 6 × Rolls-Royce Condor IIIB 12 cylinder, 650 hp (485 kW) each

Performance

- Maximum speed: 81.5 mph (131 km/h, 70.8 kn)
- Range: 4,095 mi (6,590 km, 3,558 nmi) with 3 tons payload
- Endurance: 64 hours

== See also ==
Aircraft of comparable role, configuration, and era

- R101

Related lists

- List of British airships
