= Eta (airship) =

British airship

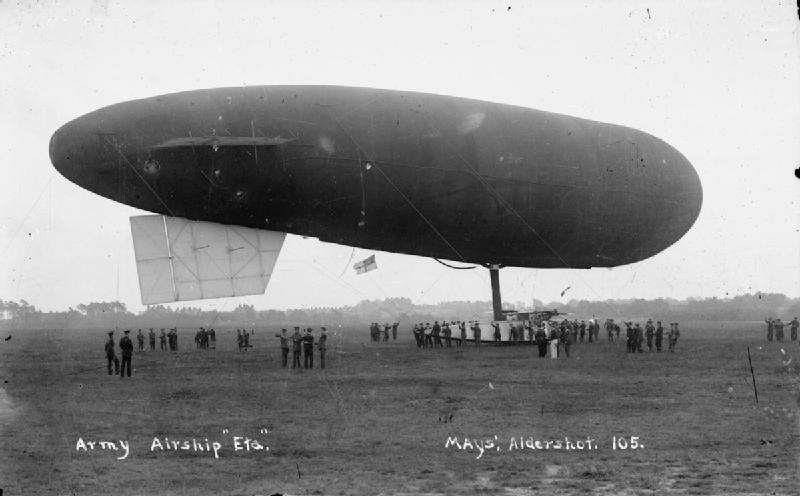

The Eta airship was a British airship built in 1913 for the British Army and later the Royal Navy.

Eta was completed in August 1913, the last airship to be built for the British Army. It was smaller than its predecessor, Delta, with a capacity of 118,000 cubic feet. An improvement was the method of securing the gondola, whose six suspension cables were repeatedly divided so that thirty-six cables were actually attached to the envelope by redesigned patches. It carried a crew of five and was driven by a pair of 80 horse-power Canton-Unné engines. She was commanded by The Hon. Claud Maitland Patrick Brabazon of the military wing of the Royal Flying Corps. When the army abandoned airships on 1 January 1914, Eta was transferred to the Royal Navy (RN) and given the designation His Majesty's Airship No.20.

== Service ==
On 19 November 1914 the Eta airship was en route to Dunkirk when she flew into a snowstorm near Redhill. After making a forced landing, she broke away from her moorings and was damaged beyond repair.
