= Willows airships =

Willows airship
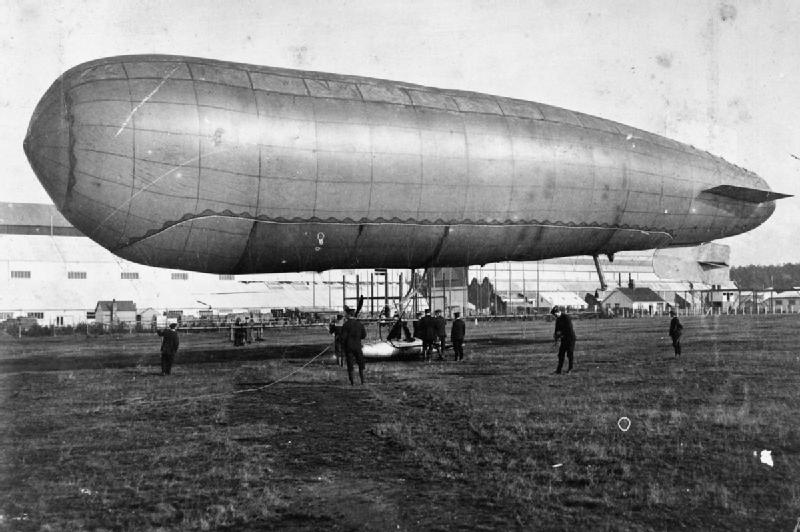
- Willows No. 4 (His Majesty's Naval Airship No. 2) at Farnborough

General information
- Type: Airship
- National origin: United Kingdom
- Manufacturer: Ernest Willows
- Designer: Ernest Willows
- Number built: 4

History
- First flight: 5 August 1905 (No. 1)

The Willows airships were a series of pioneering non-rigid airships designed and built in Wales by Ernest Thompson Willows in the first decade of the 20th century. The first airship Willows No. 1 flew in 1905, and the last, the Willows No. 5 in 1913.

== Design and development ==
=== Willows No. 1 ===
First flown for 85 minutes by the nineteen-year-old Willows from East Moors, Cardiff in Wales on 5 August 1905, the No. 1 was a small semi-rigid of 12,600 cubic feet (360 m^{3}). The 74 ft (23 m) long and 18 ft (5.5 m) diameter envelope was made from silk and had a framework gondola suspended beneath it. At the rear of the framework was a twin-cylinder 7-horsepower (5.2 kW) Peugeot motorcycle engine fitted with a two-bladed 10 ft (3.0 m) pusher propeller. The Willows No. 1 undertook six flights with the longest lasting two hours.

=== Willows No. 2 ===
Willows next airship the Willows No. 2 first flew on 26 November 1909. No. 2 was 86 ft (26 m) long and 22 ft (6.7 m) in diameter with a 29,000 cubic feet (820 m^{3}) volume. On 4 June 1910 Willows landed the No. 2 outside of Cardiff City Hall and then flew back to his shed at East Moors. On 11 July 1910 it flew from Cheltenham to Cardiff and the following month on 6 August it returned to London. The 122-mile (196 km) flight was a record for a cross-country flight in Britain and Willows was the first aviator to cross the Bristol Channel in a powered aircraft. The No. 2 was powered by a JAP 30-horsepower (22 kW) air-cooled V8 engine and had two swivelling propellers mounted either side of the suspended car. It was also fitted with a rudder for directional control.

=== Willows No. 3 - City of Cardiff ===
Willows No. 2 was re-built and lengthened to 120 ft (37 m) with a diameter of 40 ft (12 m) and a volume of 32,000 cubic feet (910 m^{3}). It retained the same JAP engine which powered two 6 ft (1.8 m) propellers. No. 3 first flew on 29 October 1910 over White City in London, England. Willows renamed his airship the City of Cardiff and on 4 November 1910 left from Wormwood Scrubs for France, thus becoming the first airship to cross the English Channel at night and the first from England to France. The journey was not without problems; the maps were dropped over the side during the night, and problems with the envelope caused the airship to land at Corbehem near Douai at two o'clock in the morning. With the help of local French aviator Louis Breguet, the airship was repaired and arrived at Paris on 28 December 1910. Willows celebrated New Year's Eve with a flight around the Eiffel Tower.

=== Willows No. 4 - His Majesty's Naval Airship No. 2 ===
The next Willows airship the Willows No.4 was slightly smaller but more streamlined than the No. 3. Completed in 1912 it had a 24,000 cubic feet (680 m^{3}) capacity, a length of 110 ft (34 m) and a diameter of 20 ft (6.1 m). The envelope had a keel on which was mounted a 35-horsepower (26 kW) Anzani engine driving two four-bladed steerable propellers. Below the keel was suspended a two-man gondola. After rejection by the Army, No. 4 was bought for £1,050 in September 1912 by the Admiralty and it became His Majesty's Naval Airship No. 2. In 1913 it was given a larger capacity envelope of 39,000 cu feet (11,000 m^{3}). By 1914 the original gondola was replaced with a three-seat version with dual controls but it only made one flight in this configuration. The envelope of this airship was used for the prototype of the very successful SS class airship which was used for anti U-boat activities in World War I.

=== Willows No. 5 ===
Following the sale of No. 4, Willows established a spherical gas balloon school at Welsh Harp, Hendon. During this time he developed a new airship, the Willows No. 5 with a rubberised fabric and a volume of 50,000 cubic feet (1,400 m^{3}). First flown on 27 November 1913 the 130 ft (40 m) No. 5 had a gondola which could carry four people. It made a number of flights from Hendon over central London in February 1914.

== Specifications (No. 4) ==
Data from

General characteristics

- Crew: 2
- Length: 110 ft 0 in (33.55 m)
- Diameter: 20 ft 0 in (6.1 m)
- Volume: 39,000 cu ft (1,100 m^{3})
- Powerplant: 1 × Anzani , 35 hp (26 kW)

Performance

- Maximum speed: 50 mph (80 km/h, 43 kn)

== See also ==
Related lists

- List of British airships
- List of aircraft of the Royal Naval Air Service
