= Slide Rule: Autobiography of an Engineer =

1954 book by Nevil Shute

- First edition
- Author: Nevil Shute
- Language: English
- Genre: Non-fiction
- Publisher: Heinemann
- Publication date: 1954

Slide Rule: Autobiography of an Engineer is the partial autobiography of the British novelist Nevil Shute. It was first published in 1954. Slide Rule concentrates on Nevil Shute's work in aviation, ending in 1938 when he left the industry.

The book begins with details of Shute's childhood and upbringing, his school years, events in the Easter 1916 Dublin Rising, where his father was Secretary to the Post Office in Ireland, and service during World War I. Shute came into contact with aircraft while a student at Oxford, when he worked at the de Havilland aircraft factory during the vacations.

The rest of the book is divided into two parts. The first is about Shute's experiences working on the R100 airship project at Vickers. This was the private counterpart to the Air Ministry's R101, both designed as part of the Imperial Airship Scheme to develop airships capable of flying the Empire routes to India, Canada and Australia. Shute's job was initially that of Chief Calculator, responsible for overseeing all the stress calculations needed. On the resignation of the airship designer, Barnes Wallis, he became the project chief engineer. He was also a passenger on the airship's flight to Canada in 1930. He recounts the experience of a mid-air repair of a rudder over the North Atlantic, and of being caught in an up-draught over a thunderhead over Canada.

The R100 design was the project on which he mentions using a slide rule (a Fuller cylindrical model), only mentioned once in the book. The stress calculations for each transverse frame required computations by a pair of calculators (people) for two or three months. The simultaneous equation contained up to seven unknown quantities, took about a week to solve, and had to be repeated if the guess on which of eight radial wires were slack was wrong with a different selection of slack wires if one of the wires was not slack. After months of labour filling perhaps fifty foolscap sheets with calculations "the truth stood revealed (and) produced a satisfaction almost amounting to a religious experience".

The final part of the book is about Shute's experiences in co-founding and managing Airspeed Ltd between 1931 and 1938. During this time, there was little business and much difficulty. As Shute tells it, the first time the company made a profit was in 1938, the year he resigned as a director.

Shute then spent the war as a reluctantly commissioned naval officer working for the "Wheezers and Dodgers" (the British Admiralty's Directorate of Miscellaneous Weapons Development) with time off to write a few novels, before becoming disillusioned by the post war UK government and emigrating to Australia. There, his considerable success as a best-selling author kept him active until he died from a heart attack in 1960. He never wrote his planned follow up to Slide Rule (which had the working title of Set Square). Much later, American Julian Smith wrote a comprehensive and somewhat controversial biography.

== Bibliography ==
- Shute, Nevil (1954). Slide rule : the autobiography of an engineer. Heinemann. OCLC 609541893.
- Smith, Julian (2002). Nevil Shute : a biography. The Paper Tiger. ISBN 978-1-889439-30-3. OCLC 907425400.
