= Beardmore Tornado =

1920s British diesel aircraft engine

Tornado
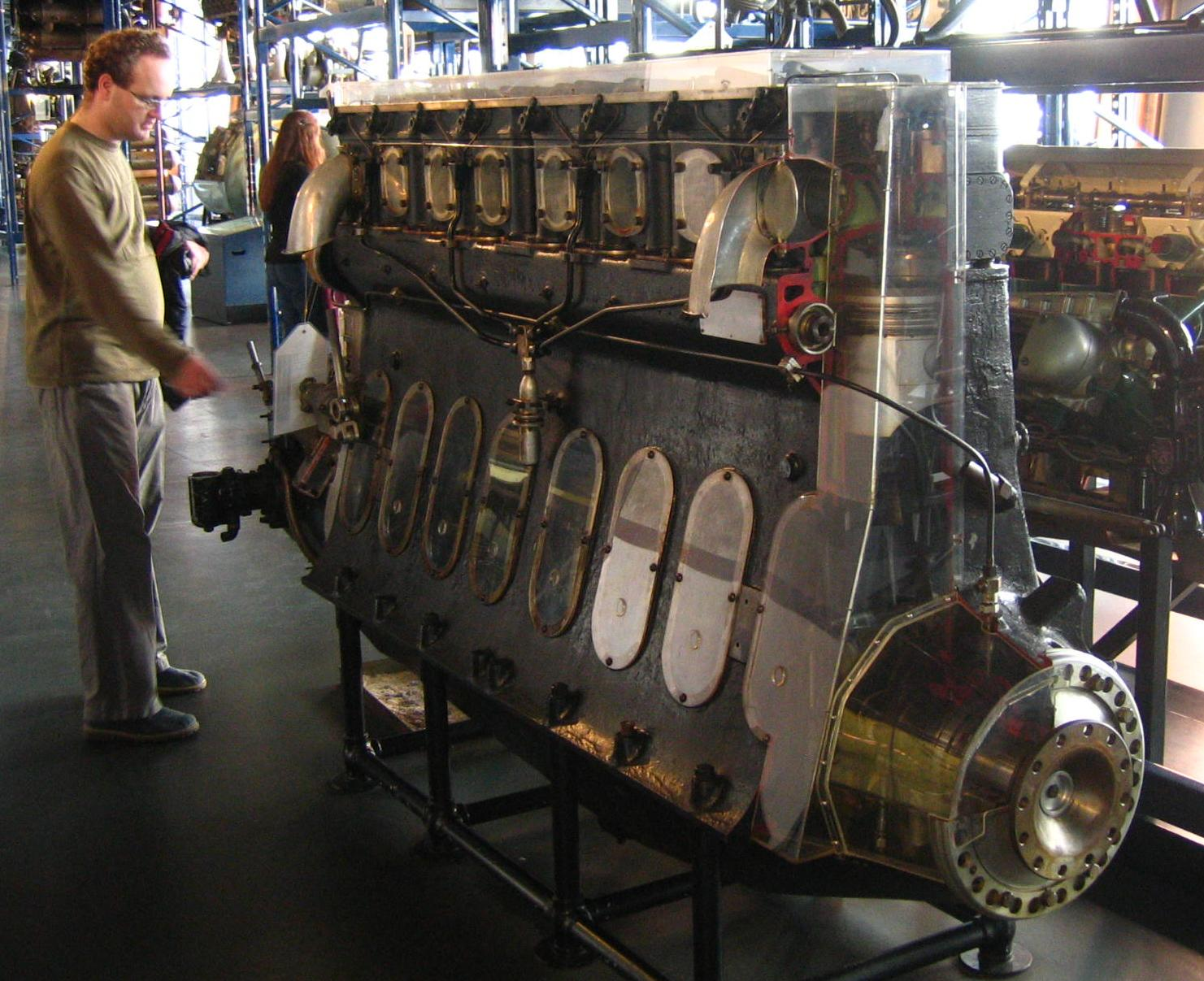
- R101 Tornado engine in the Science Museum, London
- Type: Inline Diesel engine
- National origin: United Kingdom
- Manufacturer: William Beardmore and Company
- First run: 1927
- Major applications: R101

The Beardmore Tornado is an eight-cylinder inline diesel aircraft engine built in 1927 by William Beardmore and Company of Glasgow, Scotland, and used in the British R101 airship when petrol engines were thought unsafe in the tropics. The model is given as Tornado IIIA or Tornado III C.I. The fuel is described as Diesel heavy-oil.

== Design and development ==
The engine was designed by combining two four-cylinder units used for railcars into the eight-cylinder (MkI) engine. These were intended to give an output of 700 bhp (520 kW) at 1,000 rpm but in practice, had a continuous output rating of only 585 bhp (436 kW) with a maximum of 650 hp (485 kW). At 17 tons for the five, they were six tons above design weight. The weight with the power car was over three tons per engine. The big end bearings were also found to be prone to early failure, In addition, there were two critical vibration frequencies which coincided with idling and cruising speeds, resulting in a limitation on the maximum rpm and consequently a reduction in power output.

The Tornado had steam cooling; water in the cylinder jackets was allowed to come to boiling point, and then condensed in three small triangular radiators on the hull above the power cars, or for the two midships engines was condensed in a retractable radiator and used to heat the passenger accommodation. Running the engines at a relatively high thermal temperature was expected to improve the specific fuel consumption. The Tornado engines used Ricardo petrol starting engines, and there had only been time to replace one with a Beverley heavy-oil starting engine (itself started by compressed air) on one Tornado.

The engines were intended to have reversing propellers, but they failed. At one point during development of R101, one engine was used only for astern running at the start and finish of flights, a decision that astonished Nevil Shute and the other engineers on the R100 team. Later two engines were made reversible by an adjustment to the camshaft.

The R101 had five Tornado engines. The proposed R102 airship was to have seven engines of an improved version of the Tornado, having an output of 850 bhp (630 kW, maximum) or 700 bhp (520 kW, cruising, continuous), but the project was cancelled in 1931 after the crash of the R101 and the end of the Imperial Airship Scheme. The R100 would have used the Tornado, but petrol engines were chosen to avoid delays.

== Specifications (Tornado III) ==
Data from Masefield

=== General characteristics ===
- Type: 8-cylinder liquid-cooled inline upright layout engine
- Bore: 8.25 inches (210 mm)
- Stroke: 12.0 inches (304.8 mm)
- Displacement: 5,130.8 in^{3} (84.125 L)
- Dry weight: 4,733 lb (2150 kg) bare engine, 8,580 lb (3890 kg) installed

=== Components ===
- Fuel type: Diesel heavy-oil
- Cooling system: Water/steam cooling (see above)

=== Performance ===
- Power output: 650 bhp (480 kW) at 935 rpm maximum; 475 bhp (350 kW) at 825 rpm cruise
- Compression ratio: 12.25:1
- Fuel consumption: 279 lb/hr (127 kg·h^{−1}) maximum; 200 lb/hr (92 kg·h^{−1}) cruise
- Specific fuel consumption: 0.429 lb/bhp/hr (261 g·kW^{−1}·h^{−1}) maximum, 0.421 lb/bhp/hr (256 g·kW^{−1}·h^{−1}) cruise
