= 23-class airship =

Rigid training airships in the UK

23 class
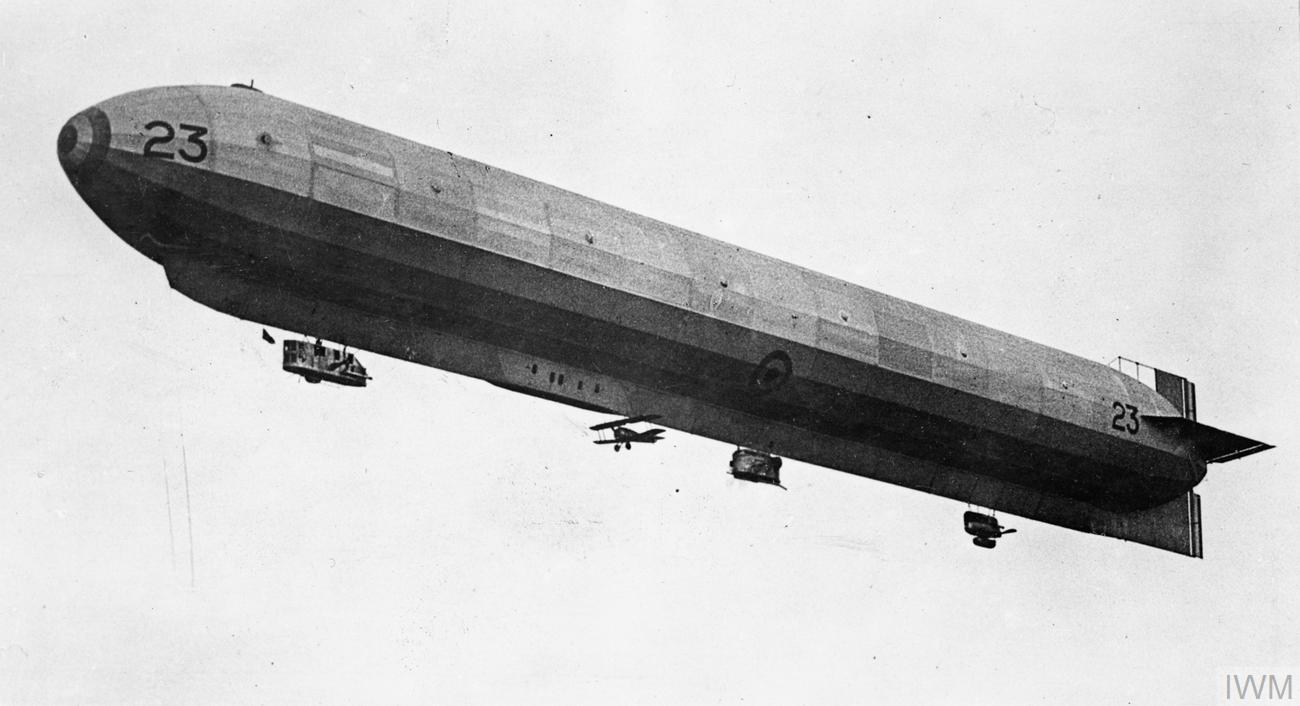
- 23r with underslung Sopwith Camel

General information
- Type: Training airship
- National origin: United Kingdom
- Manufacturer: Vickers (23r and R26), Beardmore (24r), Armstrong-Whitworth (25r)
- Number built: 4

History
- First flight: 19 September 1917

The 23 class were rigid airships produced in the United Kingdom during the First World War. Development of the 23 class began in August 1915 when Vickers was asked to improve the 9r design by increasing its gas capacity by adding a bay and increasing the capacity of the bow and stern gas cells. The 23-class was designed by H.B. Pratt and Barnes Wallis of Vickers. Vickers built the first and last of the four ships. The other two were built by William Beardmore and Company and Armstrong-Whitworth. While the 23 class airships were never used in combat, the four ships provided many hours of valuable training and experimental data for British airship crews and designers. Although a total of 17 of these ships were contemplated at one time, only four were ever built. The 23 class was found to be significantly overweight, leading to its cancellation in favour of the more-refined R23X class.

== Design and development ==
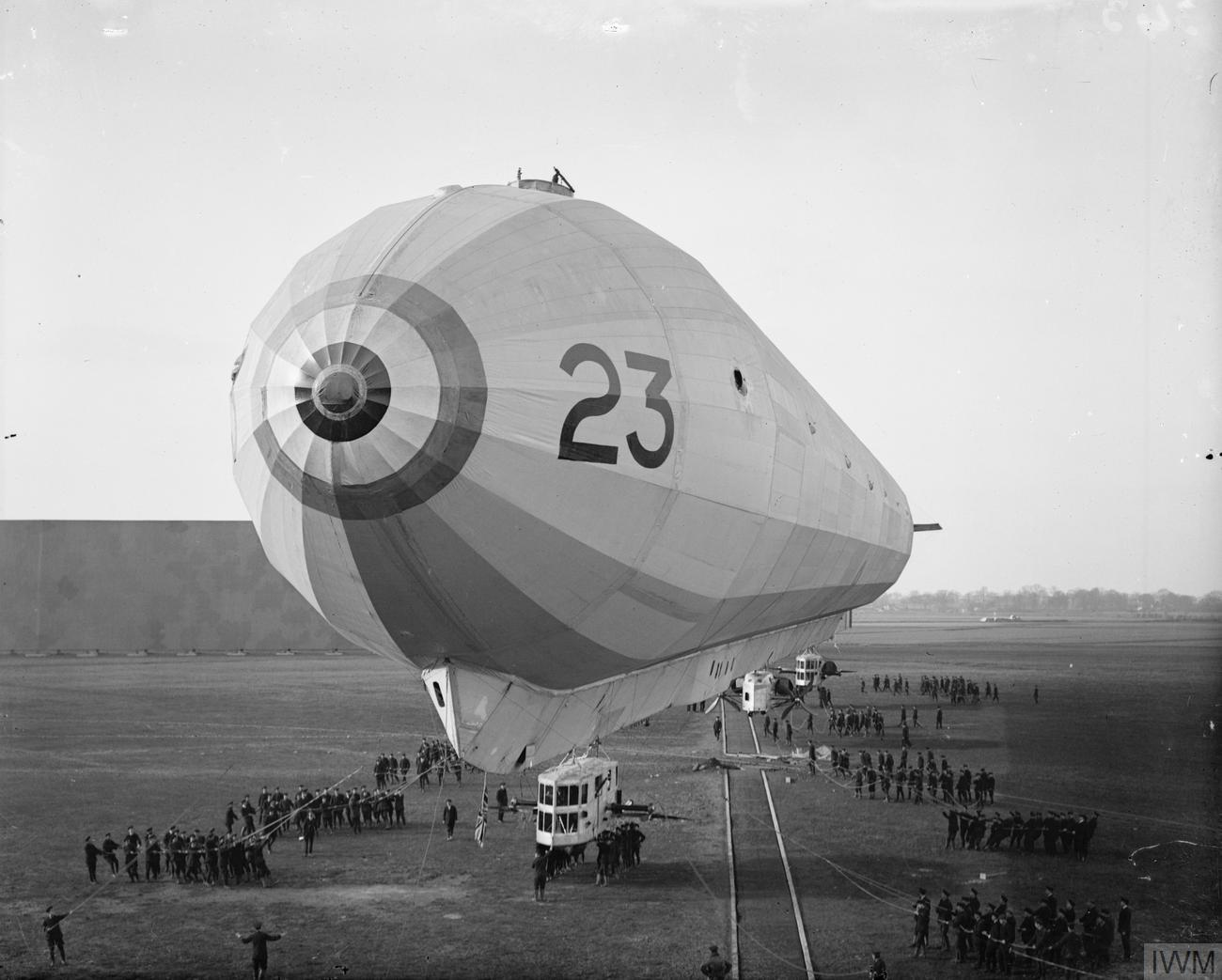
Photograph of 23r taken during the First World War

Following proposals in July 1915 to order more airships to the same design as the 9r then being built by Vickers, on 28 August Vickers were asked to design a new class of airship based on the 9r. To facilitate rapid mass-production, the same transverse frame design as the 9r were used, but lift was increased by adding an extra bay and by making the nose and tail fuller to accommodate larger gasbags. The great portion of the 23 class structure was identical to the 9r's. Power was provided by four 250 hp (190 kW) Rolls-Royce Eagle engines. The triangular section exterior keel had a widened section amidships incorporating a bomb bay, sleeping quarters, radio room and toilet. Three gondolas were suspended from the keel. The forward gondola contained the control room and one engine driving a pair of swivelling propellers, a second amidships contained two engines each driving a fixed four-bladed pusher propeller on outriggers, and the aft gondola contained the fourth engine driving a single two-bladed pusher propeller and an emergency control car. Ballast and fuel were carried in tanks along the keel. Rudders and elevators were of the cruciform type. The design drawings were approved on 10 October 1915.

== Construction ==
Initially three examples were ordered. One was to be built by Vickers at Barrow-in-Furness, Cumbria. A second, 24r, was ordered from William Beardmore and Company at Inchinnan, in Renfrewshire, Scotland. The third, 25r, was ordered from Armstrong-Whitworth at Barlow, North Yorkshire. Many of the components for the ships were built by Beardmore and Armstrong. In December the Treasury approved construction of sixteen more airships, also agreeing on Government loans for the construction of additional construction sheds. One more ship was ordered from Vickers and two from Beardmore and Armstrong. However at this point the Treasury intervened, refusing to allow construction of any more airships until there were sufficient sheds in which to house them.

== Operational history ==
=== 23r ===
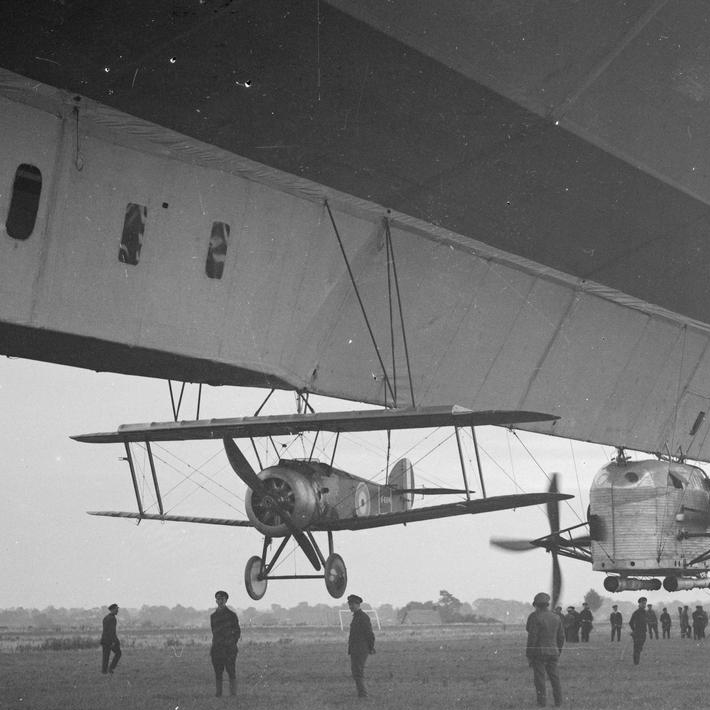
23r with Sopwith 2F.1 Camel N6814

Construction was begun by Vickers on 1 January 1916. Construction was delayed by material shortages (including the shortage of linen caused by the Easter rising in Ireland) and strikes. The trial flight took place at Barrow on 19 September 1917. The ship was found to have less than the rated lift so the dynamos, bomb gear and furniture were removed to save weight. A 240 hp (180 kW) Maybach engine from the crashed Zeppelin L 33 replaced the Rolls-Royce in a new rear car, this one without emergency controls.

23r flew to RNAS Howden, Yorkshire, on 15 October 1917, and then to RNAS Pulham, Norfolk, on 29 October. It flew over central London on 6 December, bringing the city to a standstill and generating a wave of patriotic fervour. Despite the airship's identification markings being clearly visible to millions of Londoners, the censors banned publication of the name of the ship. A record flight of 40 hours 8 minutes was made in May 1918, as well as experiments with defensive armament of a 2-pounder 40 mm (1.57 in) QF gun and three machine guns. The shells from the large gun caused the ground crew at Pullham some alarm when they ricochetted off the ground instead of exploding harmlessly. In July, experiments were made with parasite fighters, in the hope that they could defend the airship. First an unmanned, then a manned, Sopwith Camel were launched successfully. In November, the experiment was successfully completed with two other manned Camels. No. 23r overflew the surrender of the German submarine fleet at Harwich in November 1918, before being modified for experiments with the three-wire mooring system in March 1919. It was retired in September 1919 after a total of about 320 hours.

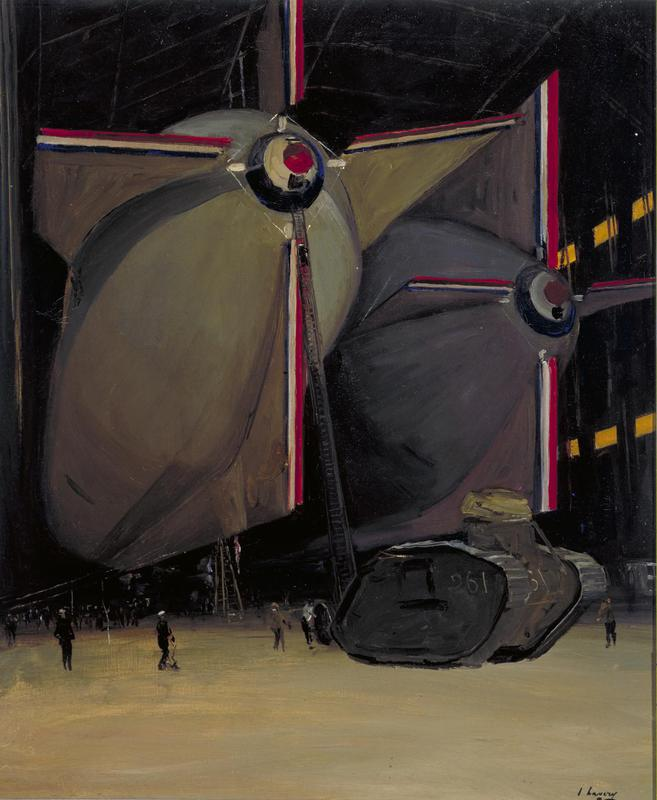
Painting of two 23-class airships at Pulham by John Lavery. Note the tank in the foreground used for ground-handling.

=== 24r ===
When the decision was taken to lighten the overweight 23r and 25r in October 1917, 24r was tested as well. The problem was found to be even worse, with 24r weighing around 1,500 lb (680 kg) more than its sisters – a difference that was eventually traced to the use of slightly larger and heavier fasteners throughout her structure. A solution was required with some urgency, since Beardmore's construction shed needed to be cleared so that work could begin on R34, but the problem was exacerbated by 24r needing all the lift possible to safely navigate the hilly Scottish countryside. Eventually, the decision was taken to completely strip its aft power car, removing the engine and all associated machinery. While this gave 24r more than enough lift, it limited its top speed to 35 mph (56 km/h).

It was intended that the rear power car would be eventually replaced with one of lighter design, but this was never carried out, and 24r operated throughout the war with only three engines. On one occasion, this led to a situation over Bass Rock where the airship was held immobilised by a headwind, prevented from making any headway at all. It was eventually retired in December 1919 with a total flight time of 164 hours and 40 minutes over a distance of 4,200 mi (6,720 km).

=== 25r ===
25r was built by Armstrong-Whitworth and completed five weeks after 23r, in October 1917. When found to have the same weight problems during trim trials carried out in a hangar at Armstrong-Whitworth's airship works at Barlow, North Yorkshire, it was similarly lightened, carrying out its first test flight on 14 October 1917. In later flights, another problem emerged: surging of the gasbags caused sudden and unpredictable movement of the ship's centre of pressure, thereby causing instability. Despite this problem, the airship (by now known as R 25) was officially accepted into service on 23 December 1917, and continued in service until September 1919, by which time it had flown 221 hours and 5 minutes and covered 5,909 mi (9,454 km).

=== R.26 ===
R.26 was the first airship designated under the new system of adding an "R" prefix rather than an "r" suffix for rigids. It had the benefit of being only in the early stages of construction when the weight problems with its sisters were discovered, allowing weight-saving measures to be implemented from the outset. On 4–5 June 1918, it set a new endurance record for the 23 class by carrying out a patrol of 40 hours 40 minutes. With 23r, it oversaw the surrender of the German U-boats at Harwich, before being assigned to experiments in early 1919 to investigate the practicalities of mooring airships in the open. While promising at first, its envelope was eventually soaked with rain, and the airship was subsequently beaten into the ground by a snowstorm. Although refloated by removing its power cars, the structural damage was found to be too great to warrant repairs, and it was struck off charge on 10 March.

== Operators ==
United Kingdom

- Royal Navy

== Specifications ==
Data from

General characteristics

- Length: 535 ft 0 in (163 m)
- Diameter: 53 ft 0 in (16 m)
- Volume: 942,000 cu ft (27,000 m^{3})
- Useful lift: 14,600 lb (6,600 kg)
- Powerplant: 4 × Rolls-Royce Eagle V12 , 250 hp (190 kW) each

Performance

- Maximum speed: 52 mph (84 km/h, 45 kn)

== See also ==
- Zeppelin

Related development

- R23X-class airship
