= No. 9r =

British rigid airship

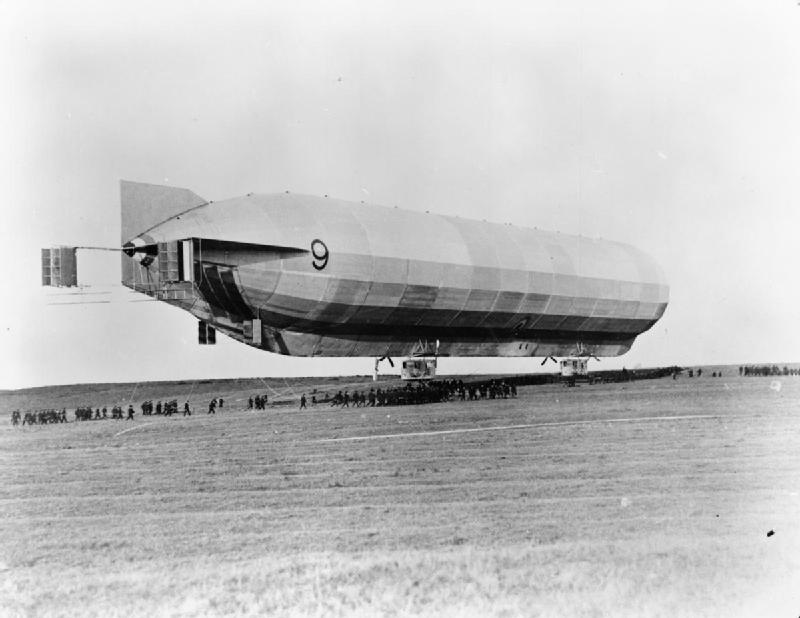

General information
- Type: Experimental airship
- National origin: United Kingdom
- Manufacturer: Vickers Ltd
- Designer: H. B. Pratt and Barnes Wallis
- Number built: 1

History
- First flight: 27 November 1916

HMA No. 9r was a rigid airship designed and built by Vickers at Walney Island just off Barrow-in-Furness, Cumbria. It was ordered in 1913 but did not fly until 27 November 1916 when it became the first British rigid airship to do so. It was dismantled in June 1918 after being flown for around 165 hours, mainly for experimental purposes.

== Background ==
Plans to build a second rigid airship to follow the unsuccessful HMA No. 1 (His Majesty's Airship No. 1) Mayfly were agreed by the Committee of Imperial Defence in early 1913, and that Vickers should be asked to design an improved class of ship incorporating all that was then known about the Zeppelins. Vickers' airship design department had been disbanded following the failure of the Mayfly, consequently a new department was formed when the original design team was reassembled with H. B. Pratt recruited as chief designer. Pratt had been working at Vickers while the Mayfly was being constructed and had predicted that it was not structurally sound and subsequently left the company. Pratt in turn hired Barnes Wallis, whom he had met while both were working for the shipbuilding firm of J. Samuel White, as his assistant. The initial order for the new ship was placed on 10 June 1913, with the final plans being agreed at the end of the year, and a formal contract was signed in March 1914.

== Design ==
The initial specification called for an airship with a disposable lift of 5 tons (5080 kg) capable of flying at 45 mph (72 km/h) and maintaining an altitude of 2,000 ft (610 m) for 30 minutes; however, the required load was later reduced to 3.1 tons (3150 kg). The hull was cylindrical for most of its length and was constructed from 17-sided transverse frames with a triangular section keel underneath. Two gondolas were suspended from the keel, the forward one containing the control compartment and two of the engines, the aft containing an emergency control station and the remaining pair of engines. In addition there was a radio cabin and a mess space for the crew within the keel structure, which also contained the fuel and ballast tanks. Propulsion was provided by four 180 hp (130 kW) Wolseley engines, mounted in pairs in the gondolas. Like Mayfly, it was designed with watertight cars so that it could be operated from water. The design was based in part on French plans of the German craft Z IV which had landed in France on 3 April 1913 following an accidental incursion into French airspace, permitting a thorough examination.

Construction was delayed by a number of circumstances. Difficulties were encountered with the fabrication of the duralumin girders for the transverse frames, and there were many changes to the design, including strengthening the hull so that it could be handled safely by inexperienced crews, and replacing the original drive arrangement of paired propellers mounted on the sides of the hull with swivelling propellers mounted on the gondolas (as used on contemporary British Army dirigibles).

== Construction ==
The construction shed at the Cavendish Dock at Barrow was too small for the new design so a new hangar was built at Walney Island, off the west of Barrow. The new shed was 540 ft (160 m) long, 150 ft (46 m) wide and 98 ft (30 m) high, and had a 6 in (15 cm)-thick concrete floor with handling rails embedded into it which extended 450 ft (140 m) into the adjacent field. As a safety measure the shed had eight fire extinguishing jets fed by a dedicated reservoir. A gasbag factory employing 100 staff was also set up beside the shed.

When World War I broke out on 4 August 1914 No.9r was nearly ready for erection, and despite competing demands for materials and manpower for other projects, construction continued during the first months of the war. However, there was a feeling that the project was no longer favoured by the Admiralty: Winston Churchill, then First Lord of the Admiralty was known to be unenthusiastic about airships, and on 12 March 1915 he cancelled the order for the ship. The reasons given for this decision were that it was expected that the war would be finished in 1915, and that the vessel would not be operational by then and thus was a waste of valuable resources.

On 19 June 1915, after Churchill had been replaced as First Lord by Arthur Balfour, a conference was held at the Admiralty to consider all airship development. At that time the non-rigid airship programme was proving to be successful, and at this meeting it was agreed to expand the non-rigid programme and also to resume construction of HMA No.9. However, resumption of work was delayed by the necessity to retrieve Pratt and Wallis who had enlisted in the Army when construction was cancelled. Final erection of the ship began in the autumn of that year, but there were delays in obtaining flax from Ireland to make nets for the gasbags following the Easter Rising, and the ship was not completed until 28 June 1916.

== Operational history ==
On 16 November 1916, No. 9r left its shed and was moored outside for tests of the fittings and engines, the first test flight taking place on 27 November 1916. This was the first time a British rigid airship had flown; however, it was unable to lift the contract weight of 3.1 tons. It was therefore lightened by the removal of both rear engines, replacing them with a single engine that had been salvaged from the Zeppelin L 33 which had made a forced landing in Little Wigborough, Essex, on 24 September 1916. New, lighter, gasbags were also fitted. These modifications increased the disposable lift to 3.8 tons (3861 kg), and it was accepted by the Navy in April 1917.

No.9r was then sent to the RNAS airship station at Howden in the East Riding of Yorkshire where it spent most of the time being used for experimental mooring and handling tests. From 17 October 1917 to June 1918 it was stationed at RNAS Pulham in Norfolk where it was finally dismantled due to demand for shed space to allow construction of newer airships, having spent 198 hours and 16 minutes in the air, of which some 33 hours were at a mooring mast. Although unable to compete against contemporary Zeppelins, No.9r provided valuable experience of handling a rigid airship and the use of mooring masts, which would evolve into a unique method of mooring airships.

== Specifications ==
Data from

General characteristics

- Length: 526 ft 0 in (160.32 m)
- Width: 53 ft 0 in (16.15 m)
- Volume: 846,000 cu ft (24,000 m^{3})
- Useful lift: 8,500 lb (3,900 kg)
- Powerplant: 4 × Wolseley piston engines, 180 hp (130 kW) each

Performance

- Maximum speed: 43 mph (69 km/h, 37 kn)

== See also ==
- No. 23r
- R23X class airship
- R31 class airship
- R33 class airship
- R34 (airship)
