= Imperial Airship Scheme =

1920s British transportation plan

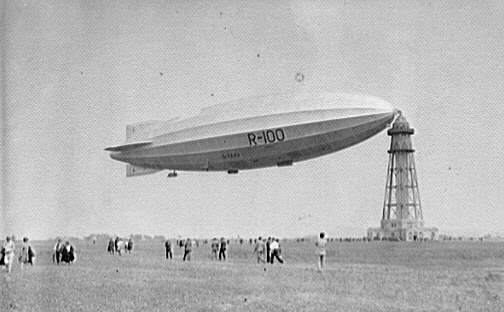
The R100

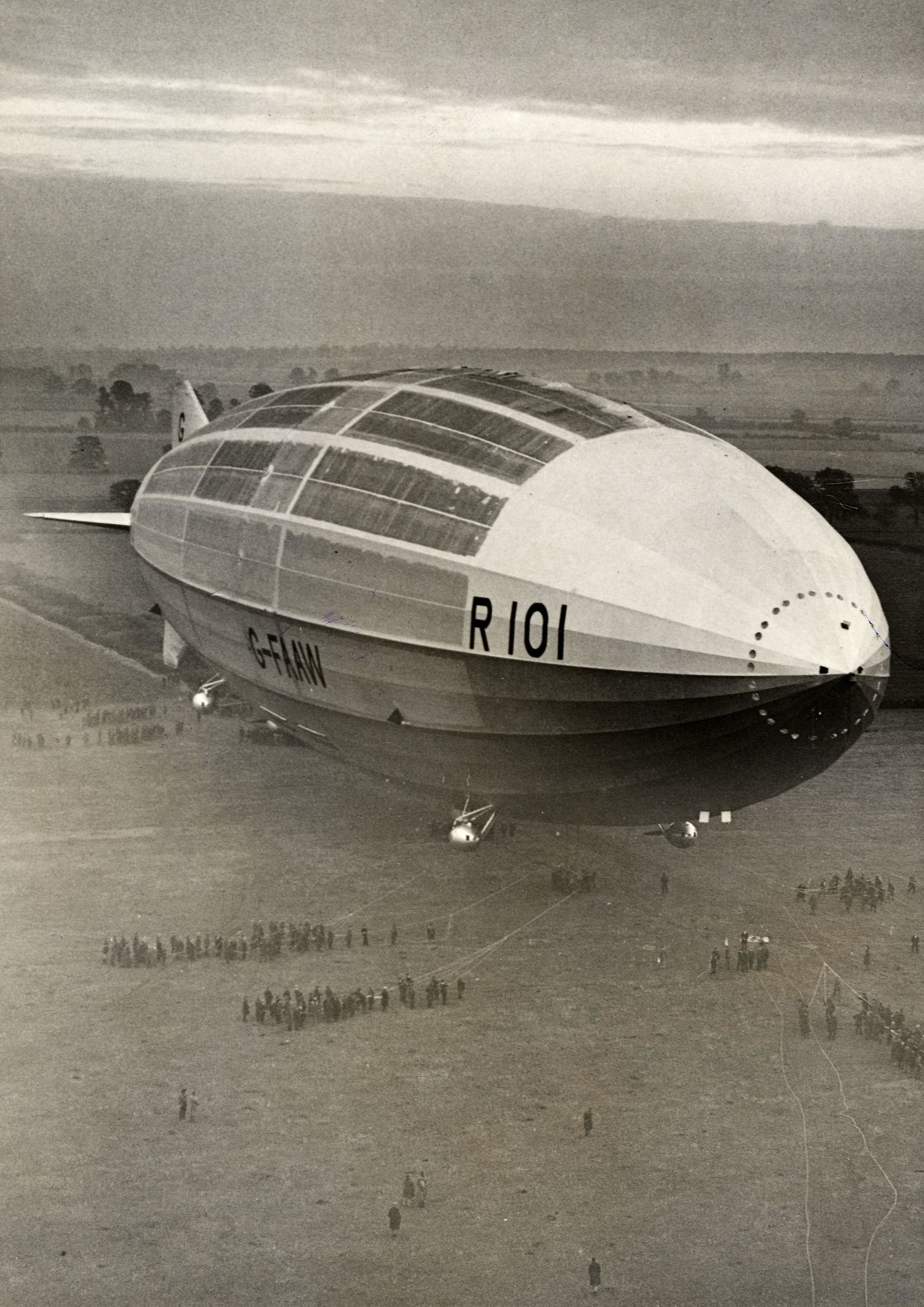
The R101

The British Imperial Airship Scheme was a project conceived in 1924 to improve communication and provide transportation between Great Britain and distant countries of the vast British Empire by establishing regular air service using passenger airships. The first phase was the construction of two large and technically advanced airships, the R100 and the R101; the R100 made a successful transatlantic trial flight to Canada and back during the summer of 1930. In October 1930, the R101, beset with several design and manufacturing flaws, crashed and burned in France while attempting its first flight to India. In 1931, following the loss of the R101, the entire British airship scheme was terminated.

== Early proposals ==
In July 1921, Alfred Henry Ashbolt, the Agent-General for Tasmania, proposed the creation of an Imperial Airship Company to the Imperial Conference being held in London. The use of heavier-than-air craft over such distances was seen as impractical at this time. The company was to be partly financed by the countries of the Empire, with some funding from private sources and the rest provided by the British government. A sub-committee chaired by Frederick Guest, the Secretary of State for Air, was established to investigate the idea. Although this reported favourably, no firm decision was reached since the members considered that further consultation with the various governments of the nations of the Empire was needed, and eventually only Australia felt that they could afford the investment.

In 1922, the Vickers company – which had been involved in British airship construction since His Majesty's Airship No. 1 in 1911 – proposed a scheme for the development of large commercial airships to provide a passenger service to link the countries of the British Empire. Named the "Burney scheme" after its creator Dennistoun Burney, it involved the construction of six airships at an estimated cost of £4 million, to be built and operated by Vickers. £1.2 million would be raised by the issue of shares paying 6% per annum, and a further £2.2 million by the issue of debentures. Both would be guaranteed by the British government and by India and Australia, the total public liability being estimated at £119,000 per annum.

The Burney Scheme was referred to a sub-committee of the Committee of Imperial Defence for consideration. Although this committee reported favourably in August 1922, no action was taken by the Government until after the 1922 General Election, which returned a Conservative government led by Bonar Law. The new government re-established the advisory committee to explore the financial details of the scheme and also established an Advisory Panel to examine technical and operational matters. This was chaired by the Air Member for Supply and Research, Air vice-marshal Geoffrey Salmond, and included among its members Burney and C. B. Thomson. Although the Burney Scheme was approved in principle, its adoption was delayed by Treasury misgivings about the financial details.

== The Imperial Airship Scheme ==
Following the general election in December 1923 which resulted in a hung parliament, in January 1924, the Conservative government was replaced by Ramsay MacDonald's Labour administration. Thomson had stood as Labour candidate in the general election but was not returned; since MacDonald wanted him in the government he was elevated to the House of Lords as Lord Thomson of Cardington, and became Secretary of State for Air in the new government. (Note: The MacDonald ministry lost power in November 1924 and Thomson did not return to the post until 1929.)

Under Lord Thomson, the Burney Scheme was rejected and replaced by the Imperial Airship Scheme. The new scheme involved the construction of two airships: one, R100, to be designed and built by a specially established Vickers subsidiary managed by Burney, the Airship Guarantee Company; and the other to be designed by the government's Royal Airship Works at Cardington. Thomson's principal objections to the Burney plan were that at the end of the programme Vickers would have an effective monopoly of airship construction, that insufficient provision had been made for the provision of suitable ground facilities, and that the proposed operating company would effectively be a state-subsidised concern but would not be subject to government control. A further benefit of his scheme was that at the end of the initial period there would be two airships. It was expected that the scheme would cost £1,350,000.

The R100 would be designed largely using existing technology, while the R101 was intended to act as a test-bed for innovative techniques in airship design. The two airships were soon referred to as the "Capitalist" ship (R100) and the "Socialist" ship (R101). Further airships would include the best features from both. Both airships were designed to the same technical specification, which required passenger accommodation for 100 and a fuel capacity adequate for 57 hours flight at a cruising speed of 63 mph (101 km/h). Acceptance of the airships was conditional upon the completion of a flight testing programme which would culminate in a flight to India, with a stop in Egypt for refuelling. A further requirement was that both had to conform to an as-yet undeveloped formula for airframe strength.

== Airships ==
The R100 was designed by Barnes Wallis, with Nevil Shute Norway as Chief Calculator, responsible for all the stress calculations. Writing under the name of Nevil Shute, Norway later became a successful novelist, and also wrote a memoir, Slide Rule: Autobiography of an Engineer which gives an account of the airship development program. Design of the R101 was under the direction of Lt.Col. V. C. Richmond, with Michael Rope as his assistant and Harold Roxbee Cox as chief calculator.

It was considered that petrol was unsuitable as a fuel for airships intended for use in hot climates due to its low flash point. For this reason, R101 was powered by diesel engines, and R100 was originally intended to use engines burning a mixture of hydrogen and kerosene. The program to develop the Beardmore Tornado diesel engines was beset with difficulties, the engines being both overweight and unable to produce the expected power output. Similarly, the development of hydrogen/kerosene engines ran into difficulties and so the R100 team made a decision to use existing petrol-fuelled aircraft engines. This resulted in Canada being substituted for India as the destination of the acceptance trial flight.

The initial timetable, drawn up in March 1924, expected construction of R101 to begin in July 1925 and be complete by the following July, with a trial flight to India planned for January 1927. Construction of R101 was delayed by the need for an extensive research program: among other things, this involved the construction and load-testing of an entire bay of the proposed design. R100 was also delayed by the limited resources available, due to it being constructed under a fixed-price contract; it was obvious fairly early in the design process that design and construction costs would exceed the purchase price. Thus neither airship flew until late 1929.

Both airships were overweight, R101 more so than R100, mainly due to its diesel engines. R101's weight problem was compounded by its having a smaller gas capacity than R100, a result of its innovative structural design, in which the transverse ring-frames occupied a larger proportion of the interior volume of the ship. These issues were initially addressed by increasing the gas capacity by letting out the gasbag wiring system, and later by the insertion of an extra bay.

Weight and lift figures
	R101	R101 after extension	R100
Total fixed weight	113.60 long tons (115.42 t)	117.90 long tons (119.79 t)	105.52 long tons (107.21 t)
Engines weight	12.63 long tons (12.83 t)	12.26 long tons (12.46 t)	6.22 long tons (6.32 t)
Service load including ballast	18 long tons (18 t)	18 long tons (18 t)	18 long tons (18 t)
Gasbag capacity	4,893,740 ft^{3} (138,575 m^{3})	5,509,753 ft^{3} (156,018.8 m^{3})	5,156,000 ft^{3} (146,000 m^{3})
Total lift: gasbags at 96% capacity, pressure height of 1,200 ft (370 m)	142.62 long tons (144.91 t)	160.57 long tons (163.15 t)	150.26 long tons (152.67 t)
Payload (fuel, passengers, cargo)	11.02 long tons (11.20 t)	24.67 long tons (25.07 t)	26.74 long tons (27.17 t)

In August 1930, R100 made the transatlantic journey to Canada, visiting Quebec, Montreal and Toronto. At the end of June, work was started on lengthening R101 and it did not fly again until the start of October, when a single flight of around 17 hours was made. One of the engines failed during this flight and so it was not possible to carry out a full-speed trial: during previous flights R101 had been flown with only four engines available for forward propulsion, the fifth engine being used solely for reverse thrust when mooring. For the October 1930 flights, all five engines were used for forward propulsion, two being modified so that they could also provide reverse thrust.

On 4 October 1930, with a hastily issued Certificate of Airworthiness, R101 set off to make its proving flight to India under unfavourable weather conditions. After seven hours in the air, R101 crashed into a hill and caught fire near Beauvais in northern France, killing 48 of the 54 aboard, including Lord Thomson and V. C. Richmond. The exact cause is still a matter of dispute amongst airship enthusiasts and historians. Sir Peter Masefield lists thirteen factors in his detailed history of R101: without any one of them the disaster might not have happened. The desire of all involved to achieve the flight to India before the conclusion of the 1930 Imperial Conference (at which decisions would be taken on the future of the airship programme) led to a premature flight in adverse weather conditions.

== Intended development ==
Even before R100 and R101 were flown, it was realised that they were too small to carry a significant payload over the intended routes. A design study carried out at Cardington in February 1929 demonstrated that in order to meet the original operational requirement an airship of 9,300,000 cubic feet (260,000 m^{3}) would be necessary. The construction of an airship of nearly twice the volume of the existing designs was considered to require a substantial amount of research and would also necessitate the construction of a new larger shed at Cardington, and so in August 1930 a decision was made to construct two airships, R102 and R103, of 7,500,000 cubic feet (210,000 m^{3}) capacity. It was expected that these would be capable of carrying 50 passengers and ten tons of cargo for 4,000 mi (6,400 km).

Starting in 1931, it was proposed to run services from Cardington to Karachi and Montreal using R100 and R101 (which would also be lengthened). In 1934 the R102 would enter service, and in 1935 the R103 would be added. The four airships would offer monthly return services to Montreal and Karachi, and a weekly service to Ismailia in Egypt. A service to Australia was to start in 1936, and an even larger airship, the R104, was proposed.

However, on 31 August 1931, the Cabinet decided to abandon British airship development, although Cardington would still keep a watching brief on overseas developments. Grounded since the loss of R101, the R100 was scrapped in December 1931. Proposals for the planned R102, R103 and R104 were abandoned. The loss of R101, the deepening world depression, and doubts about the optimistic financial forecasts, were all factors in these decisions.

Air routes to the Empire were instead pioneered by Imperial Airways starting in 1929, initially using flying boats and later landplanes.

== Costs ==
Costs of scheme
Experimental flights of R.33 and R.34	£103,100
Cardington sheds	£205,800
Facilities at Karachi	£120,000
Mooring masts	£160,000
Research	£305,200
R100	£471,113
R101	£711,595
Operational costs	£30,056
Overheads, administration, etc.	£290,084
Total	£2,396,948 equivalent to £177,690,000 in 2024
