= R23X-class airship =

R23X class
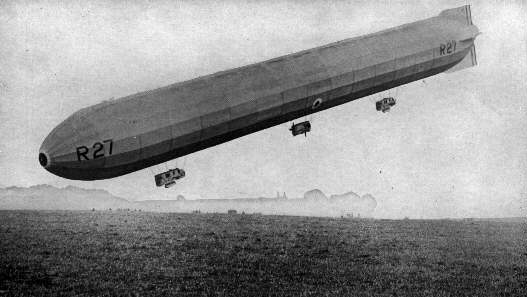
- R27 during her brief career in the summer of 1918

General information
- Type: Naval patrol airship
- National origin: United Kingdom
- Manufacturer: Beardmore (R27); Armstrong-Whitworth (R29)
- Primary user: RNAS / RAF
- Number built: 2

History
- First flight: 29 May 1918
- Developed from: 23 class airship

The British R.23X class of rigid airships were developed during World War I using the experience gained from the 23 class, but only two of the planned four R.23X class were built: R.27 and R.29. Both were completed mid-1918, but just 2 1/2 months after entering service R.27 was destroyed by fire in a hangar; while R.29 went on to become the most successful British wartime rigid airship, being the only one to meet enemy action, as well as the only one to sink a submarine.

== Design and development ==
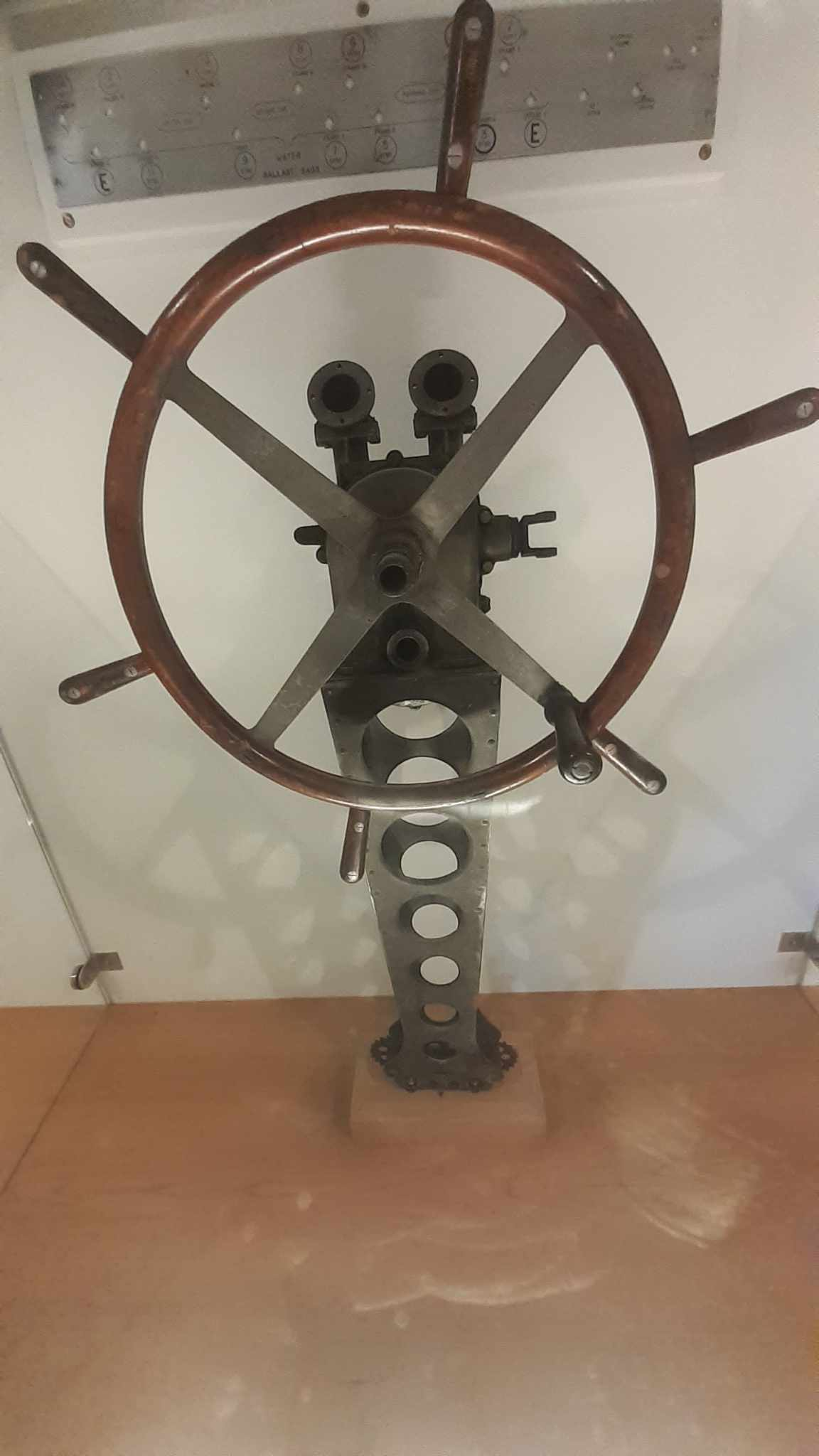
Control wheel from airship R29, Museum of Flight

The Vickers-designed 23 class rigid airships, which were basically "stretched" and modified versions of the No. 9 design, were never used in combat. However, the four ships in the class provided many hours of valuable training for British airship crews and experimental data for designers and engineers, and some radical changes and refinements were consequently incorporated into the design of the R.23X class. Originally four R.23X class were planned, R.27 to R.30 consecutively, but the programme was re-evaluated following the forced landing of L 33 (Z33) in Little Wigborough, Essex, on 24 September 1916. British engineers gained a valuable insight into the state of German rigid airship design and technology when they examined the virtually intact Zeppelin, and it was subsequently decided to cancel R.28 and R.30 in order to concentrate resources on an improved design, the new R33 class.

=== Hull ===
Redesigned bow and stern sections increased the gas capacity slightly for a corresponding increase in lift, but a more radical measure was the removal of the external keel corridor from the R.23X design. Not contributing significantly to the strength of the hull, the keel's main function was to distribute the weight of the fuel tanks, ballast bags and other heavy items, as well as to allow the crew to travel between the cars, and its removal effected a considerable reduction in weight together with improved manoeuvrability. Instead, the various loads were concentrated at the bulkheads and suspended from the radial wiring that maintained the shape of the hull. The gas-bags were shaped to accommodate a new internal corridor, created by the provision of inverted U-shaped ribs above the two lowest longitudinal members, which also allowed access to the fuel tanks and ballast. An improved system of pipes linking the fuel tanks enabled faster refuelling, and could be used to jettison fuel in an emergency. However, as with earlier designs, doped linen was used for the hull's outer covering; and being absorbent, just a few hours of rain could add around a ton of water to the weight.

=== Propulsion and testing ===
The R.23X class were powered by four 300 hp (220 kW) Rolls-Royce Eagle VI engines – later and more powerful versions of those employed by the 23r class, but arranged in a similar manner. The fore and aft gondolas each housed a single engine driving a pair of swivelling propellers, one either side, while the centre car contained two engines with one fixed propeller each.

As a result of the removal of the external keel, when the first trials were held the two airships were able to turn more quickly than their predecessors; but more importantly it was discovered during the lift and trim tests that the disposable lift was more than 8 1/2 tons. This was significantly better than any previous British airship, and allowed a greater bomb load to be carried as well as more fuel for increased range.

== Operational history ==
=== R.27 ===
R.27 was constructed by William Beardmore and Company at Inchinnan, Renfrewshire, and commissioned on 29 June 1918. Under the command of Major Ommaney she flew for a total of 89 hours 40 minutes, and came to a premature end while at RNAS (Royal Naval Air Service) Howden airship station on 16 August that year. Sharing a hangar with R.27 was a makeshift SSZ class blimp that was being assembled from a disused envelope and a spare SS Zero car. Petrol fumes from a spillage in the car were ignited some time later by a spark when the radio equipment was being tested; and the ensuing fireball, fed by fuel and gas, completely enveloped and destroyed both craft. Although the hangar itself survived, one airman lost his life, and two further blimps that were moored nearby, SSZ.38 and SSZ.54, were also destroyed.

=== R.29 ===
R.29 was constructed by Armstrong Whitworth Aircraft at Barlow, North Yorkshire, and was commissioned on 20 June 1918. She was based at the East Fortune RNAS airship station in East Lothian, Scotland, where her operational career lasted less than five months. During this time she flew for 335 hours, covered an estimated 8,215 miles (13,221 km), and became the most successful British wartime "rigid".

She carried out a number of extensive patrols including one lasting over 30 hours, and two others for more than 20 hours. She encountered German U-boats on three occasions – the first escaped; the second struck a mine when pursued; and under the command of Major G. M. Thomas on 29 September 1918 she attacked a third, UB-115 about 4.5 nautical miles (8.3 km) northeast of Beacon Point, Newton-by-the-Sea, off Northumberland. During the attack, in which R.29 was joined by armed trawlers and the destroyers HMS Ouse and Star, she dropped two 230 lb (100 kg) bombs. Intelligence reports subsequently confirmed that the submarine had been destroyed in the attack – the only recorded success by any British wartime rigid airship.

R.29 flew another 16 hours after the Armistice, and in May 1919 her midship car was replaced by a smaller and lighter type containing just one engine driving a single propeller. She subsequently flew a further 87 hours including an extended flight over Scotland accompanied by R34, and was finally deleted in October, 1919. She covered an estimated 11,334 miles (18,240 km) in service, more than any previous British rigid airship.

== Operators ==
United Kingdom

- Royal Naval Air Service / Royal Air Force

== Specifications ==
Data from

General characteristics

- Length: 539 ft 0 in (164.29 m)
- Diameter: 53 ft 0 in (16.15 m)
- Volume: 990,000 cu ft (28,000 m^{3})
- Useful lift: 17,000 lb (7,700 kg)
- Powerplant: 4 × Rolls-Royce Eagle IV water-cooled V12 engines, 300 hp (220 kW) each

Performance

- Maximum speed: 57 mph (92 km/h, 50 kn)

Armament

- Bombs: 230 lb (100 kg) bombs
