= R102 =

General information
- Type: Passenger airship
- National origin: United Kingdom
- Manufacturer: Royal Airship Works
- Status: Cancelled project

The R102 (originally referred to as Project H) was a proposed British airship that was never built. The development of the R102 in 1930 resulted from the Imperial Airship Scheme, when it became apparent that the R100 and R101 airships would not be economically viable operating over the planned routes. After the crash of the R101 in October 1930, the project was reevaluated and the entire Imperial Airship Scheme abandoned.

== Design and development ==
The design was to use seven (instead of the five used by R101) of an improved version of the Beardmore Tornado diesel engine with a maximum total output of 850 bhp (630 kW) and cruising output of 700 bhp (520 kW).

The 1930 proposal was, starting in 1931, to provide a scheduled airship service from Cardington to Karachi and Montreal using R101 and R100, to be lengthened, like R101. In 1934, R102, and a future sister-ship, R103 would begin service. By 1935, the airships would offer weekly flights to Ismailia in Egypt and monthly direct return services to Montreal and Karachi via Ismalia. The service was to be extended to Australia in 1936.

In August 1931, following the crash of the R101 on 5 October 1930 and influenced by the worsening economic climate of the Great Depression, the cabinet decided to abandon further British airship development, although Cardington would retain a watching brief on overseas developments. The remaining airship, the R100, grounded since the loss of the R101, was ordered to be dismantled and sold for scrap. Had the R102 been built, it would have been the largest airship of all time, measuring 18 feet longer than the Hindenburg.

== Specifications (provisional) ==
Data from

General characteristics

- Capacity: 50 passengers plus 5 tons of freight
- Length: 822 ft 0 in (251 m)
- Diameter: 134 ft 0 in (41 m)
- Volume: 7,500,000 cu ft (210,000 m^{3})
- Powerplant: 7 × Beardmore Tornado (diesel)

Performance

- Cruise speed: 69 mph (111 km/h, 60 kn)

== See also ==
- Imperial Airship Scheme
