= Ernest Willows =

Welsh aviator (1886–1926)

Ernest Thompson Willows
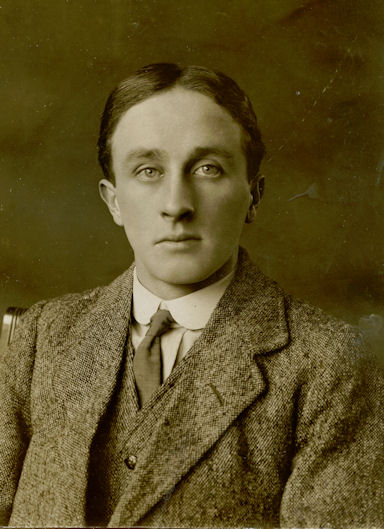
- Willows c. 1908
- Born: 11 July 1886; Cardiff, Wales
- Died: 3 August 1926 (aged 40); Kempston, Bedford, England
- Known for: Airship pioneer

Ernest Thompson Willows (1886–1926) was a pioneer Welsh aviator and airship builder. He became the first person in the United Kingdom to hold a pilot's certificate for an airship when the Royal Aero Club awarded him Airship Pilots Certificate No. 1.

== Early life ==
Willows was born in Cardiff, Wales on 11 July 1886. His parents were Joseph Thompson Willows (1859–1931) and Evelina "Eva" Louisa Willows, née Garrett (1858–1953). Both English-born, Willows' father was a dental surgeon born in Hull, and his mother was born in Bath.

Ernest's mother, Eva, previously worked as a music teacher before marrying in 1885 and starting a family.

Willows had two sisters: Doris May (1895–1961) and Daisy, the latter of whom was born in 1888 and died at about 2 months of age.

Willows was educated at Clifton College in Bristol, entering the school in 1896 and leaving in 1901, aged 15, to train as a dentist like his father.

== Aviation career ==
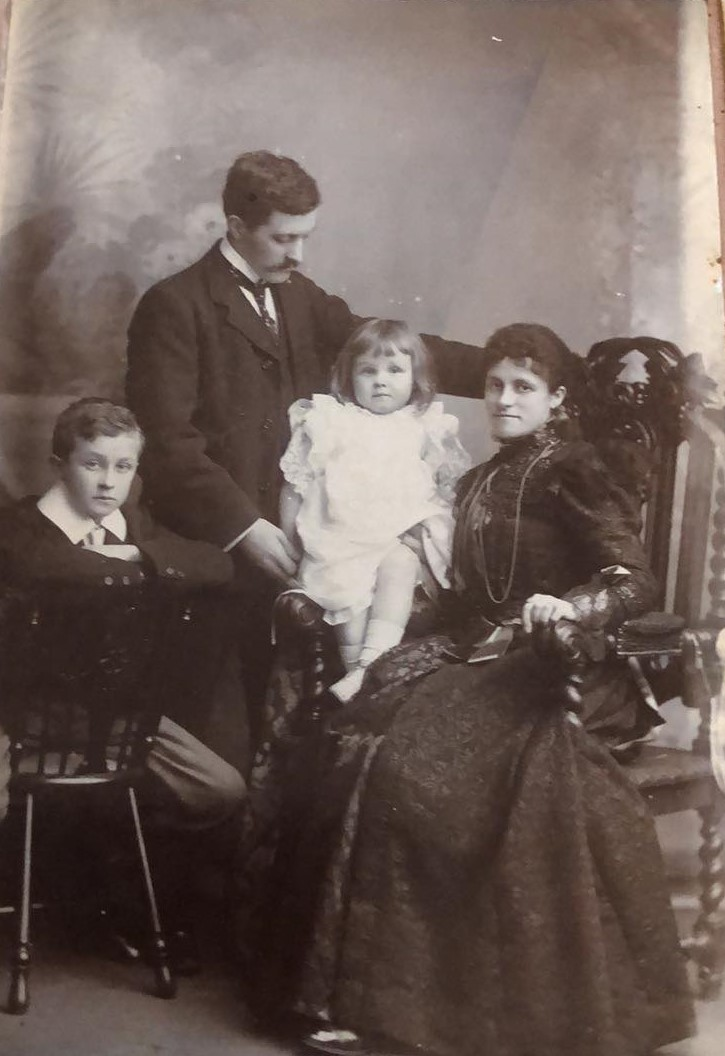
Willows with his father, mother, and sister Doris May in c. 1899.

Willows, however, had different plans for his career. He built his first airship, the Willows No. 1, in 1905 when he was 19. It was first flown from East Moors, Cardiff on 5 August 1905, the flight lasting 85 minutes. This was soon followed by an improved Willows No. 2, in which he landed outside Cardiff City Hall on 4 June 1910. No. 2 was re-built as No. 3 which he named the City of Cardiff before he flew it from London to Paris in 1910. This was the first airship crossing of the English Channel at night and the first from England to France. The journey was not without incident, including dropping the maps over the side during the night, and problems with the envelope caused the airship to land at Corbehem near Douai at two o'clock in the morning. With the help of the local French aviator Louis Breguet the airship was repaired and arrived at Paris on 28 December 1910. He celebrated New Year's Eve with a flight around the Eiffel Tower.

Willows moved to Birmingham to build his next airship, the Willows No. 4. First flown in 1912, it was sold to the Admiralty for £1,050 and it became His Majesty's Naval Airship No. 2.

With the money from the Navy, Willows established a spherical gas balloon school at Welsh Harp, Hendon near London. Although, this did not stop him building Willows No. 5 in 1913. This airship was a four-seater designed to give joy rides over London.

== Death ==
During the first World War, Willows built kite or barrage balloons in Cardiff. After the war, he continued with ballooning.

On 3 August 1926, he died in a balloon accident at Hoo Park, Kempston, Bedford. At a sports and flower show at the park, Willows was providing ascents on a balloon tethered to the ground by a rope. According to a report, the basket carrying Willows and two couples came loose and "crashed to earth from a height of 60 ft." Willows was killed instantly, along with a passenger. Three other passengers died later that day either in hospital or on their way, making five deaths in all.

== Legacy ==
There is a school named Willows High School built on his old airfield to remember him. There is also a pub called The Ernest Willows which is situated not far from the school.
