= Delta (airship) =

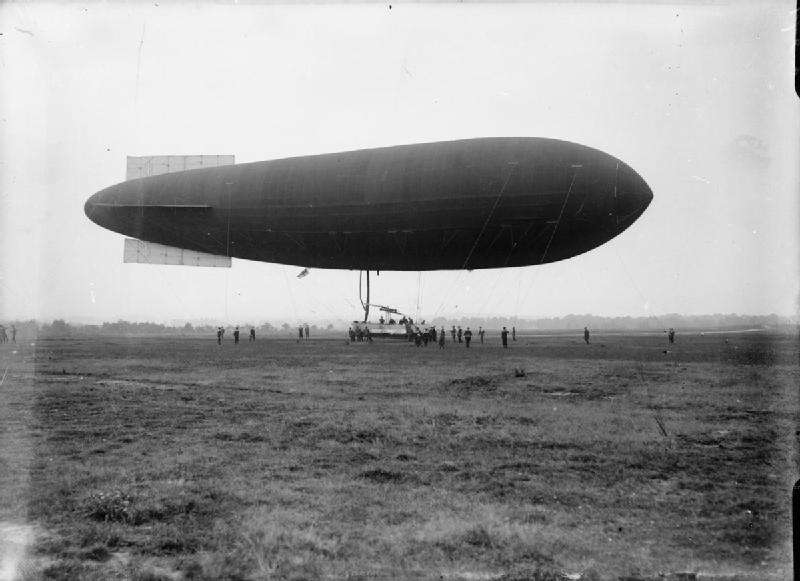

Delta was a British airship built for initially the British Army and later acquired by the Royal Navy (RN).

When the British Army abandoned airships in January 1914, Delta was sold to the Royal Navy and given the designation HMA No.19.
