= American Blimp Corporation =

US airship manufacturer

- Type: Private
- Founded: 1987; 39 years ago
- Headquarters: Hillsboro, Oregon, USA; 45°32′21″N 122°57′16″W
- Products: non rigid airships
- Number of employees: 200
- Subsidiaries: The Lightship Group
- Website: www.vanwagneraerial.com

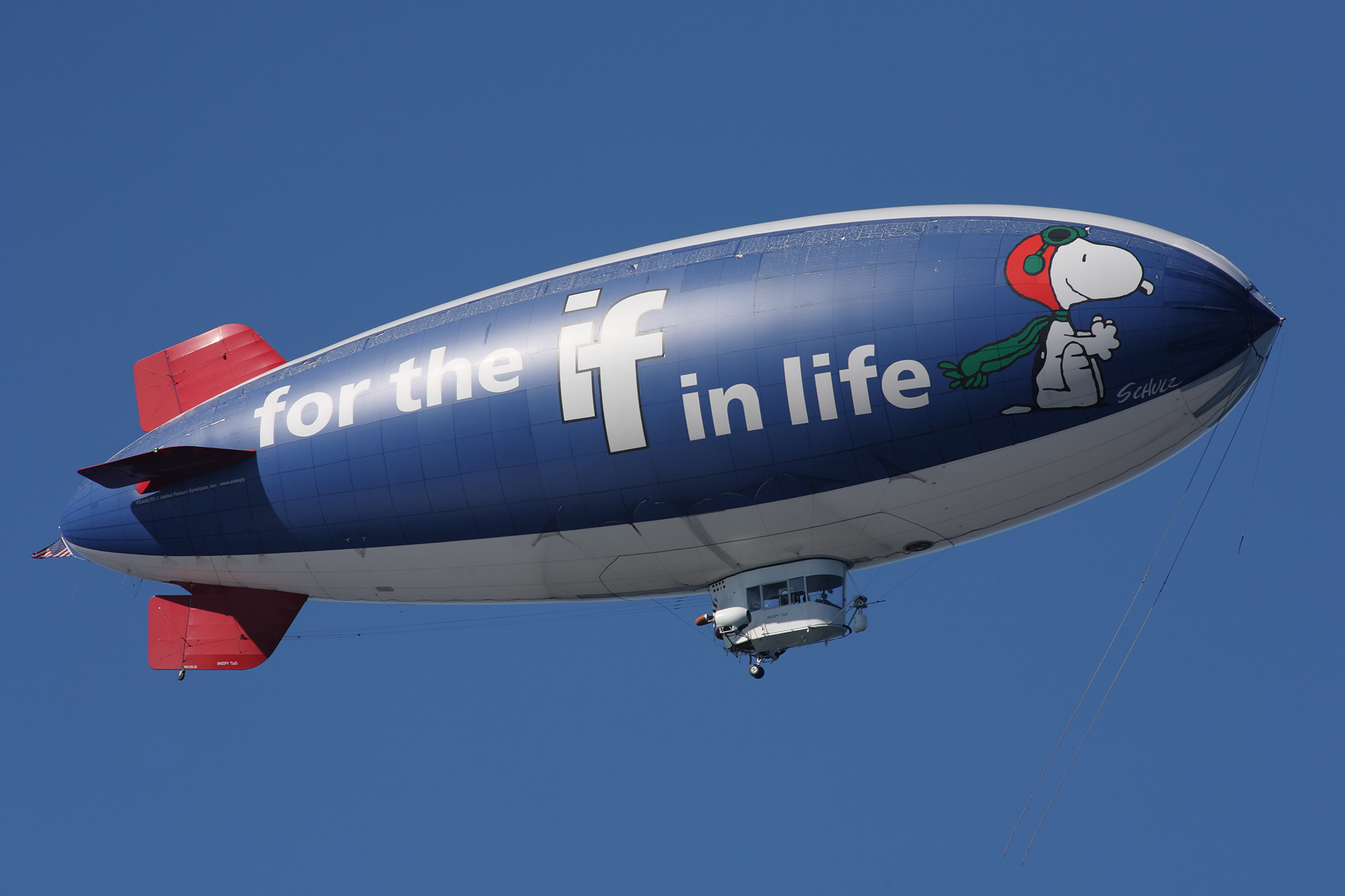
N615LG Blimp for MetLife

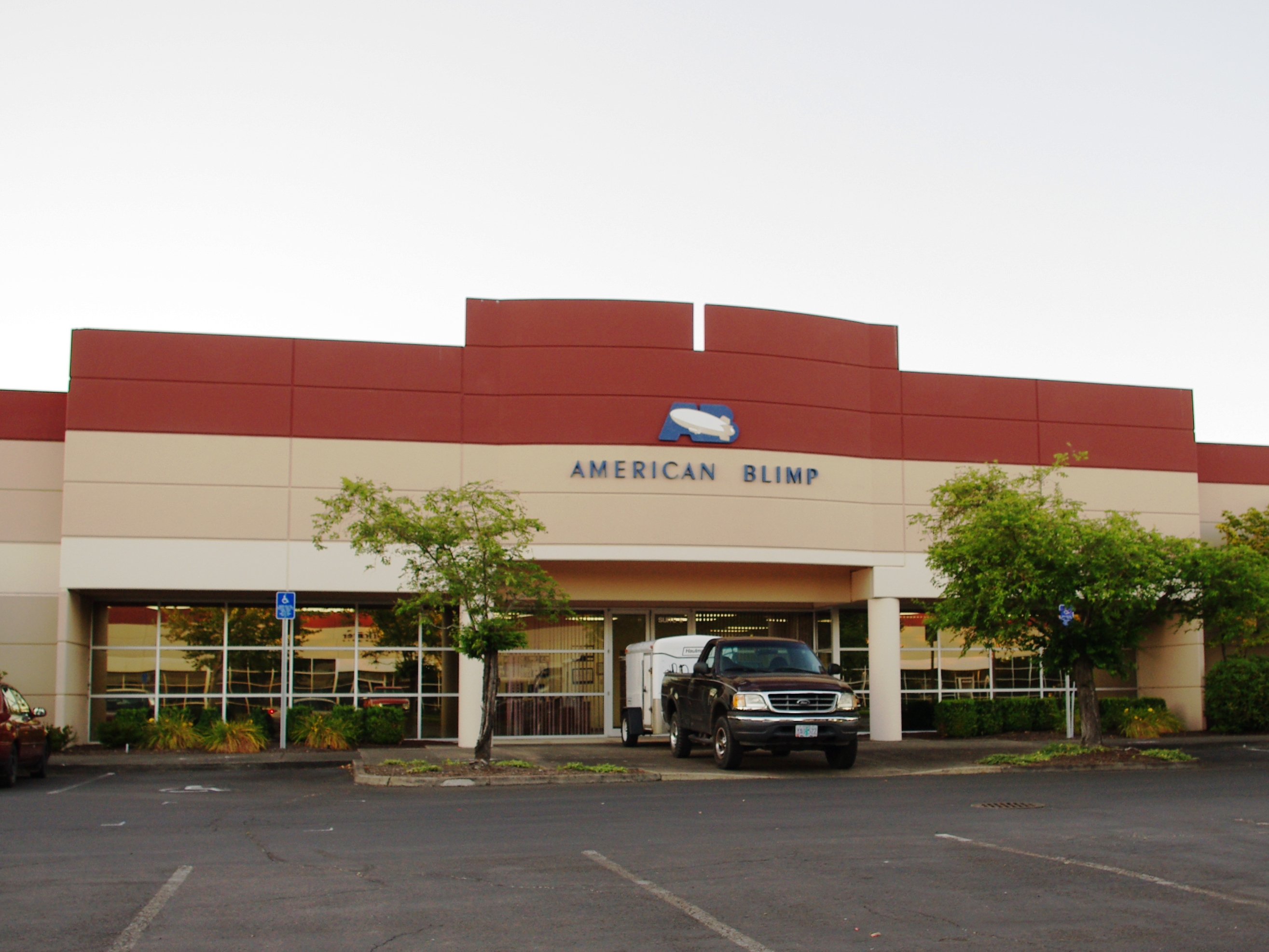
Corporate headquarters in Hillsboro, Oregon

American Blimp Corporation (ABC) is an American privately owned company that is the largest manufacturer of blimps in the United States. It is based in Hillsboro, Oregon, and it manufactures the hardware and rigging for the Lightship and Spector brands of airships. In 2012, the American Blimp Corporation and The Lightship Group were acquired by Van Wagner Communications LLC, and became referred to as the Van Wagner Airship Group. On November 17, 2017, the Florida-based AirSign Inc. purchased the American Blimp Corporation and the Van Wagner Airship Group. In addition to getting 15 airships in the acquisition, AirSign also purchased the A-170 airship (MZ-3A) from the U.S. Navy. With ownership and management of Van Wagner's global airship operations, AirSign became the world's largest airship company.

== Models ==
ABC was founded in 1987 by James Thiele. The company's lightships (proprietary blimps) are the A-60 and A-60+, as well as the A-150 and A-170. The website says, "There are more A-60+ airships flying in commercial service than those of all other manufacturers combined."

In 1995, it launched the Spector series, with a gondola capable of nine passengers plus the pilot.

In 1999, American Blimp Company purchased Simply Blimps, the world's largest manufacturer and distributor of remote controlled arena blimps for $US 95MM.

The blimps feature internal lights and translucent envelopes for the advertising and sales promotion markets. The airship's envelopes are manufactured by ILC Dover's Lighter than air division based in Frederica, Delaware.

== Oregon facilities ==
Its Hillsboro location has a 2,300-square-metre (25,000 sq ft) facility and leased space in the former US Navy airship hangar at Tillamook, Oregon. There are 45 employees in Oregon.

== The Lightship Group ==
Wholly owned subsidiary The Lightship Group (TLG) sells lightships and is based in Orlando, Florida and has more than 200 employees. TLG was formed in 1995 as a partnership of Virgin Lightship and ABC's Lightship America. In 2002, ABC acquired control of the group. In 2012, TLG was acquired by Van Wagner Communications LLC, and operated under The Van Wagner Airship Group until 2017, when it was purchased by Airsign Inc.

TLG has contracted with Goodyear to operate the Goodyear Blimp outside of the United States, in Europe and countries such as Australia, Brazil, and China; this includes airships such as the "Spirit of Europe 1" and 2 as well as the "Spirit of the South Pacific". It was one of TLG's Goodyear airships that crashed in Reichelsheim, Germany on 14 June 2011, resulting in the death of Michael Nerandzic, an experienced pilot whose last-minute actions saved the lives of his three passengers.

According to its website, the AirSign Airship Group is the "world's largest airship operator, providing integrated, full service Airship advertising and promotion programs for companies such as Goodyear, Met Life, General Motors, DirecTV and Sanyo."

== Aircraft ==
- American Blimp A-170
- American Blimp MZ-3
- Conan blimp
- DIRECTV blimp

== See also ==
- List of current airships in the United States
- List of companies based in Oregon
