= List of current airships in the United States =

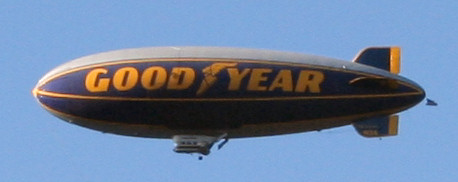
The Spirit of Goodyear, one of the iconic Goodyear Blimps

This is a list of airships with a current unexpired Federal Aviation Administration (FAA) registration.

In 2021, Reader's Digest said that "consensus is that there are about 25 blimps still in existence and only about half of them are still in use for advertising purposes". The Airsign Airship Group is the owner and operator of 8 of these active ships, including the Hood Blimp, DirecTV blimp, and the MetLife blimp.

== Goodyear ==
These airships are registered to the Goodyear Tire & Rubber Company of Akron, Ohio.

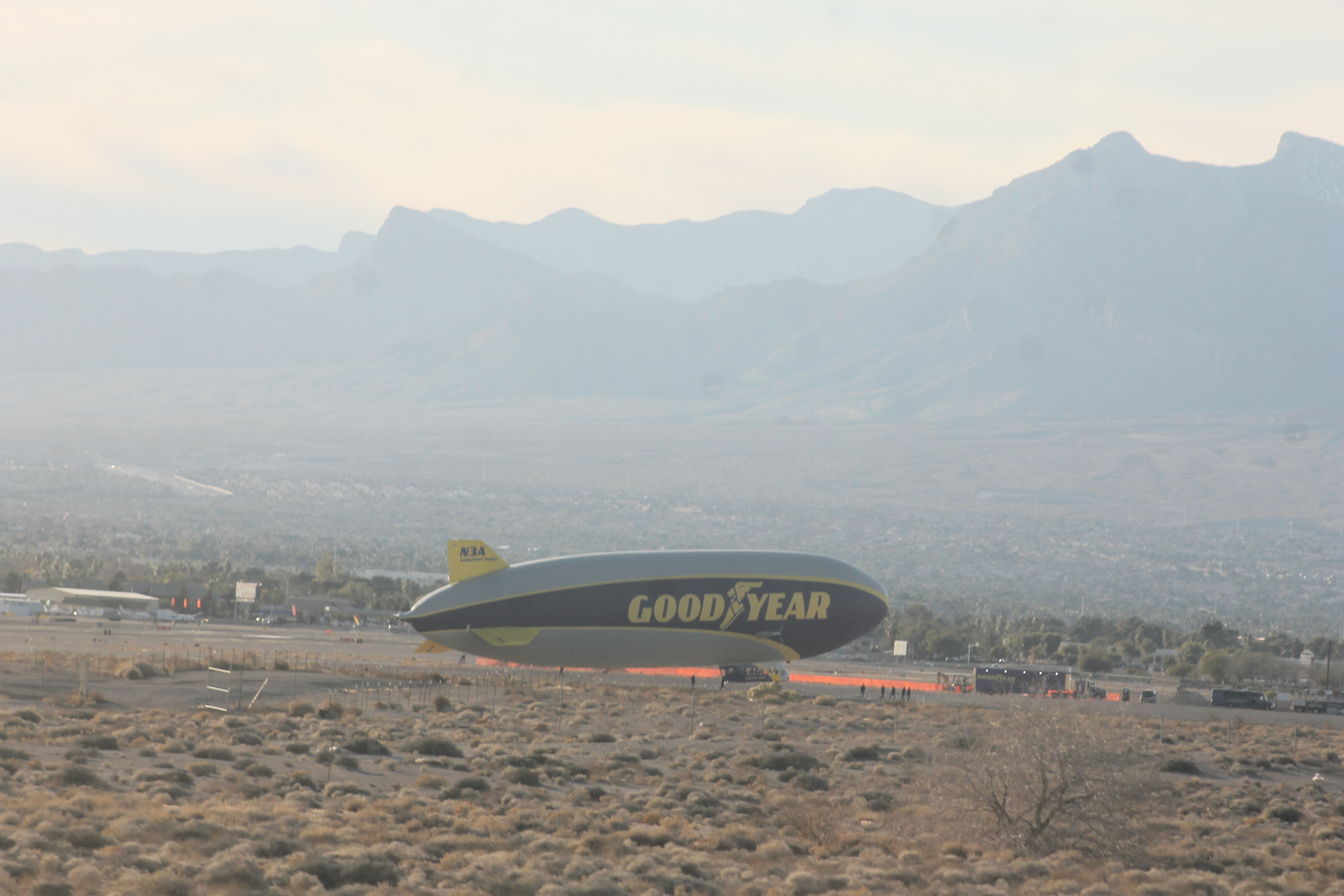
Rarely seen, one of three Goodyear Blimps, N3A, or simply known as Wingfoot Three idles at Las Vegas Airport in 2020.

“N” Number	Year built	Make	Model	Name
1A	2014	ZLT Zeppelin Luftschifftechnik	LZ N07-101	Wingfoot One
2A	2016	ZLT Zeppelin Luftschifftechnik	LZ N07-101	Wingfoot Two
3A	2018	ZLT Zeppelin Luftschifftechnik	LZ N07-101	Wingfoot Three
4A	1983	Goodyear	GZ-20A	Spirit of Innovation (retired)
10A	1979	Goodyear	GZ-20A	Spirit of America (retired)

== AirSign Airships ==
These airships are registered to AirSign Airships of Williston, Florida. Some of these have recently been re-registered to SkyShip Services of Windermere, FL.

N-Number	Year built	Make	Model
612LG	1996	American Blimp Corporation	A-60+
460LG		American Blimp Corporation	A-60+
618LG	2000	American Blimp Corporation	A60R
151AB	1997	American Blimp Corporation	A-1-70
154ZP	1999	American Blimp Corporation	A-1-70
156LG	2000	American Blimp Corporation	A-1-70
105VW		American Blimp Corporation	A-1-70
157LG		American Blimp Corporation	A-1-70G

== Icarus Aircraft ==
These airships are registered to Icarus Aircraft of Palm City, FL:

N-Number	Year built	Make	Model
607LG	1998	American Blimp Corporation	A-60+
760AB	1993	American Blimp Corporation	A-60+
2012P	1989	American Blimp Corporation	A-60+

== LTA Galactic Inc ==
These airships are registered to LTA Galactic Inc. of Akron, Ohio

N-Number	Year built	Make	Model
620LG	2002	American Blimp Corporation	A60R
324UA		LTA Galactic Inc	3X24M

== SCEYE Inc ==
These airships are registered to SCEYE of Moriarty, New Mexico

N-Number	Year built	Make	Model
?	2026	SCEYE Inc.	HAPS

== Other miscellaneous airships ==
These are other miscellaneous airships from the registry, many of which are unverified to exist or may be mistakenly listed as airships:

N-Number	Year built	Make	Model	Owner/Operator	City	ST
610SK	1985	Westinghouse Airships Inc	Skyship 600	Delaware Trust Co	Wilmington	DE
81683	1983	Thunder & Colt	AS 105	Aeronautical Adventures Inc.	Eagle	ID
493JM	1987	Thunder & Colt	AS-56	Ronald Miller	Tucson	AZ
111SY	2006		SY-1	Daniel Nachbar	Amherst	MA
577MB	1988		MB-1	James Blalock	Sheridan	AR
601SK	1985	Airship Industries UK Ltd	Airship 600	Southern Aircraft Consultancy Inc Trustee	Bungay Suffolk	Great Britain
605SK		Airship Industries UK Ltd	Airship 600	Southern Aircraft Consultancy Inc Trustee	Bungay Suffolk	Great Britain
125LT		LTA Research and Exploration LLC	Pathfinder 1	LTA Research and Exploration LLC	Sunnyvale	CA
615LG		American Blimp Corporation	A60R	LTA Research and Exploration LLC	Sunnyvale	CA
689DA		Skyborne Technology Inc	SA-70	Skyborne Technology Inc	Wewahitchka	FL
