= Loral GZ-22 =

US airship

GZ-22 Spirit of Akron
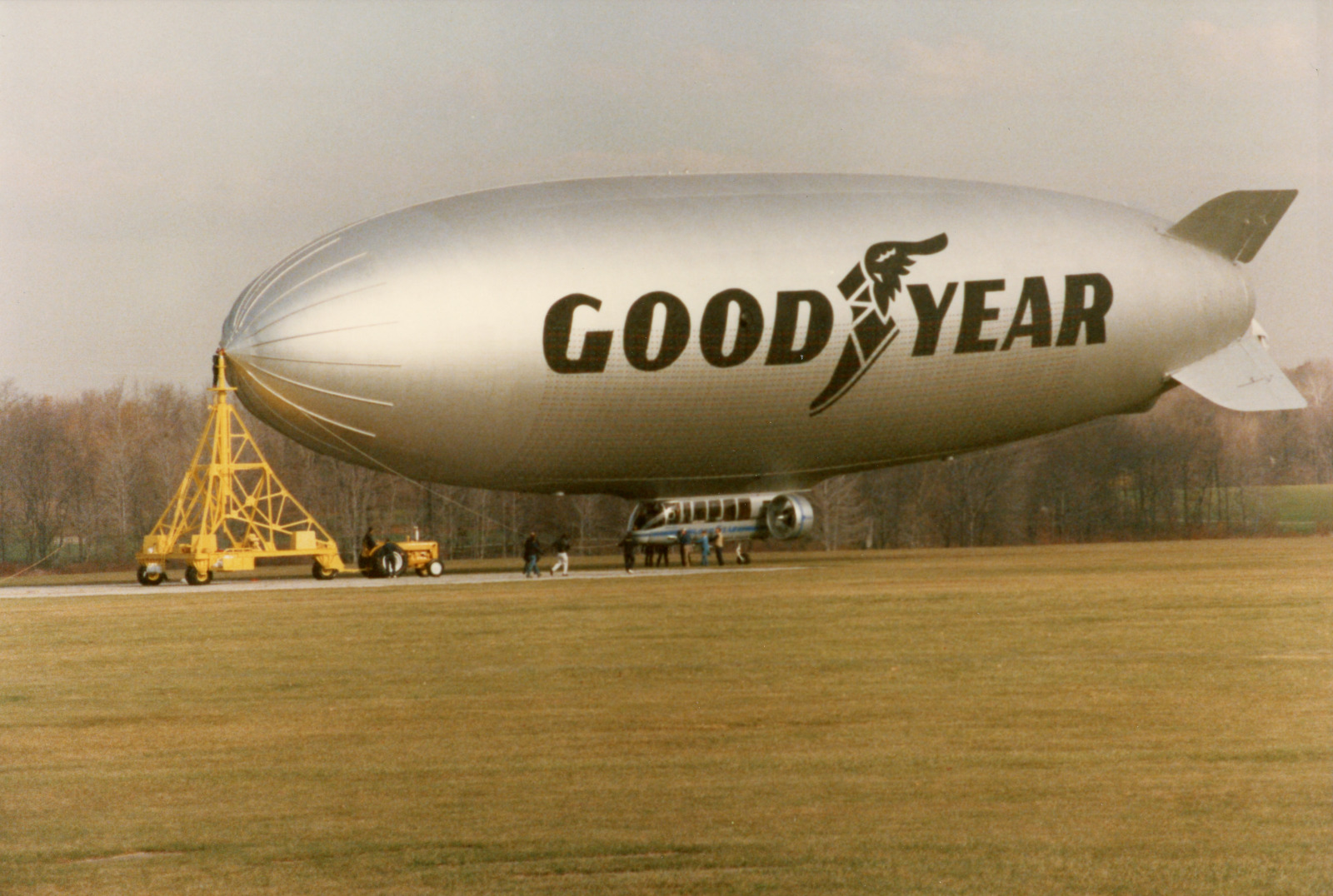
- The Spirit of Akron in Canton Ohio, on August 9, 1989.

General information
- Type: non-rigid airship
- National origin: United States
- Manufacturer: Loral Corporation
- Designer: Goodyear
- Primary user: Goodyear Tire and Rubber Company
- Number built: 1

History
- First flight: 1989
- Last flight: 1999

The Loral GZ-22 (also known as the Goodyear GZ-22) was a class of non-rigid airship, or blimp first flown in 1989 and operated by Goodyear as its flagship promotional aircraft, with civil registration N4A and christened Spirit of Akron. This was the only airship of this class ever built.

== Design and development ==
Goodyear originally designed the GZ-22 to demonstrate the possible renewed use of airships to the United States Navy, which had ended their airship operations in 1962. The GZ-22 was designed by Goodyear, but built by Loral after Goodyear sold its aerospace division to Loral in 1987. The GZ-22 had a steel-framed, composite-skinned gondola under a neoprene-impregnated polyester 2-ply envelope, inflated with helium. At its launch in 1987, the 205-foot 6-inch long Spirit of Akron was the longest airship in service at that time. The GZ-22 Type Certificate was issued on 31 August 1989.

On 28 October 1999, the Spirit of Akron suddenly entered an uncontrolled left turn and began descending over Suffield Township, Ohio, crashing into trees and sustaining severe damage. The pilot and technician on board received minor injuries. The NTSB report on the crash identified improperly hardened metal splines on the control actuators had sheared, causing loss of control and identified the probable cause as being failure by the "flight control system manufacturer to meet design (hardness) specifications".

The gondola of the Spirit of Akron is on display at the MAPS Air Museum.

== Specifications ==
Data from

General characteristics

- Crew: 1
- Capacity: 10 passengers
- Length: 205 ft 6 in (62.64 m)
- Width: 47 ft 0 in (14.33 m)
- Height: 60 ft 2 in (18.34 m)
- Volume: 247,800 cu ft (7,017 m^{3})
- Gross weight: 15,000 lb (6,804 kg)
- Powerplant: 2 × Allison 250-B17C turboprops , 420 hp (310 kW) each

Performance

- Maximum speed: 65 mph (105 km/h, 56 kn)
- Service ceiling: 10,000 ft (3,000 m)
