= American Blimp MZ-3 =

American airship, formerly military

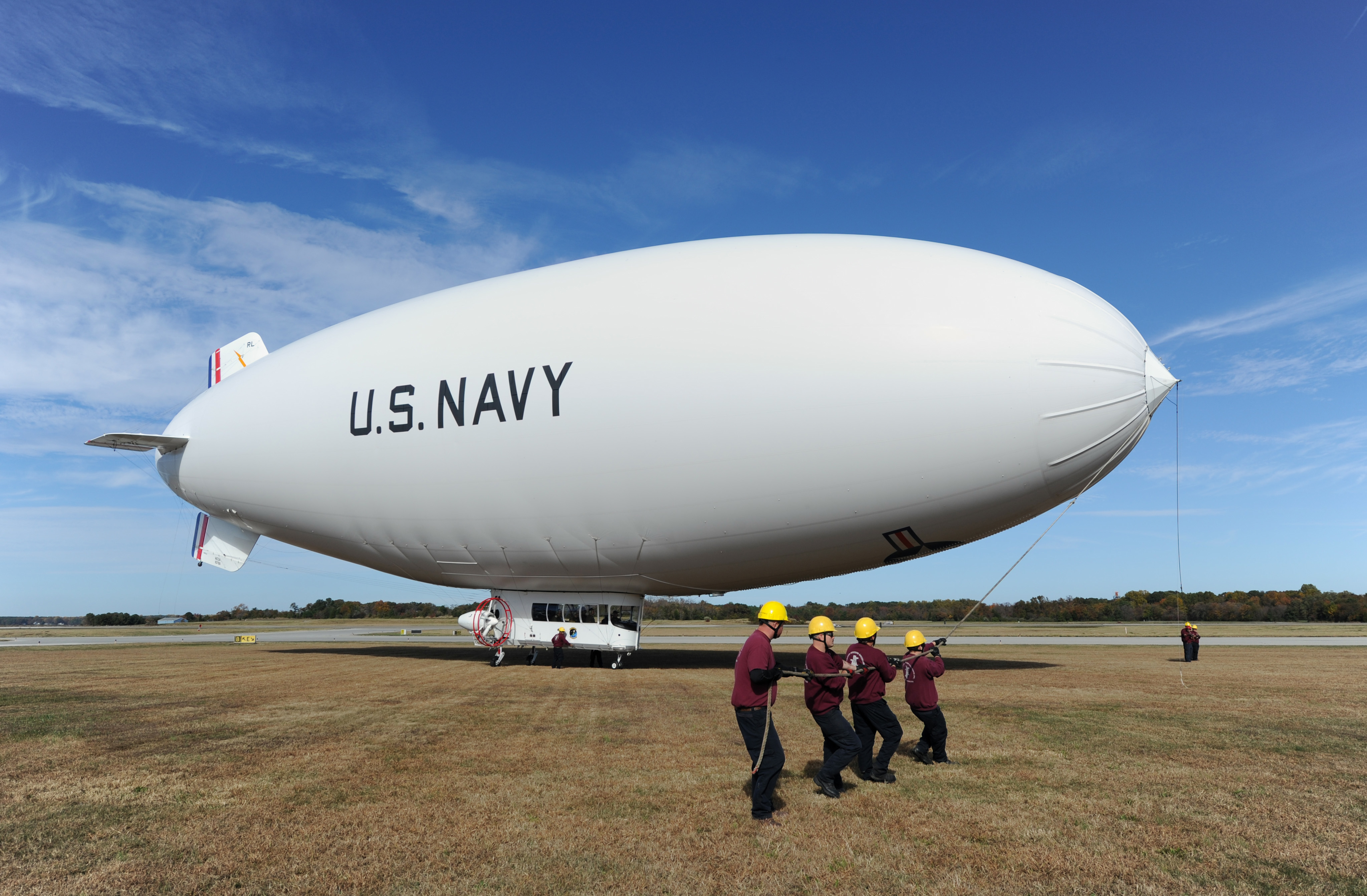
- The MZ-3A at NAS Patuxent River in November 2013

History

United States
- Name: MZ-3A
- Builder: American Blimp Corporation
- Acquired: 2005
- In service: 2006
- Out of service: 2017

General characteristics
- Type: A-170G Non-Rigid Airship
- Displacement: 170,000 cubic feet (4,800 m^{3})
- Length: 178 ft (54 m)
- Beam: 43 ft (13 m)
- Propulsion: 2 × 180 hp (130 kW) Lycoming IO-360
- Speed: 45 knots (83 km/h)
- Range: >350 NM
- Complement: 1 Pilot, 9 Passengers
- Sensors & processing systems: Various C4ISR
- Notes: Bureau Number: 167811; Ceiling: 9,500 ft (2,900 m)

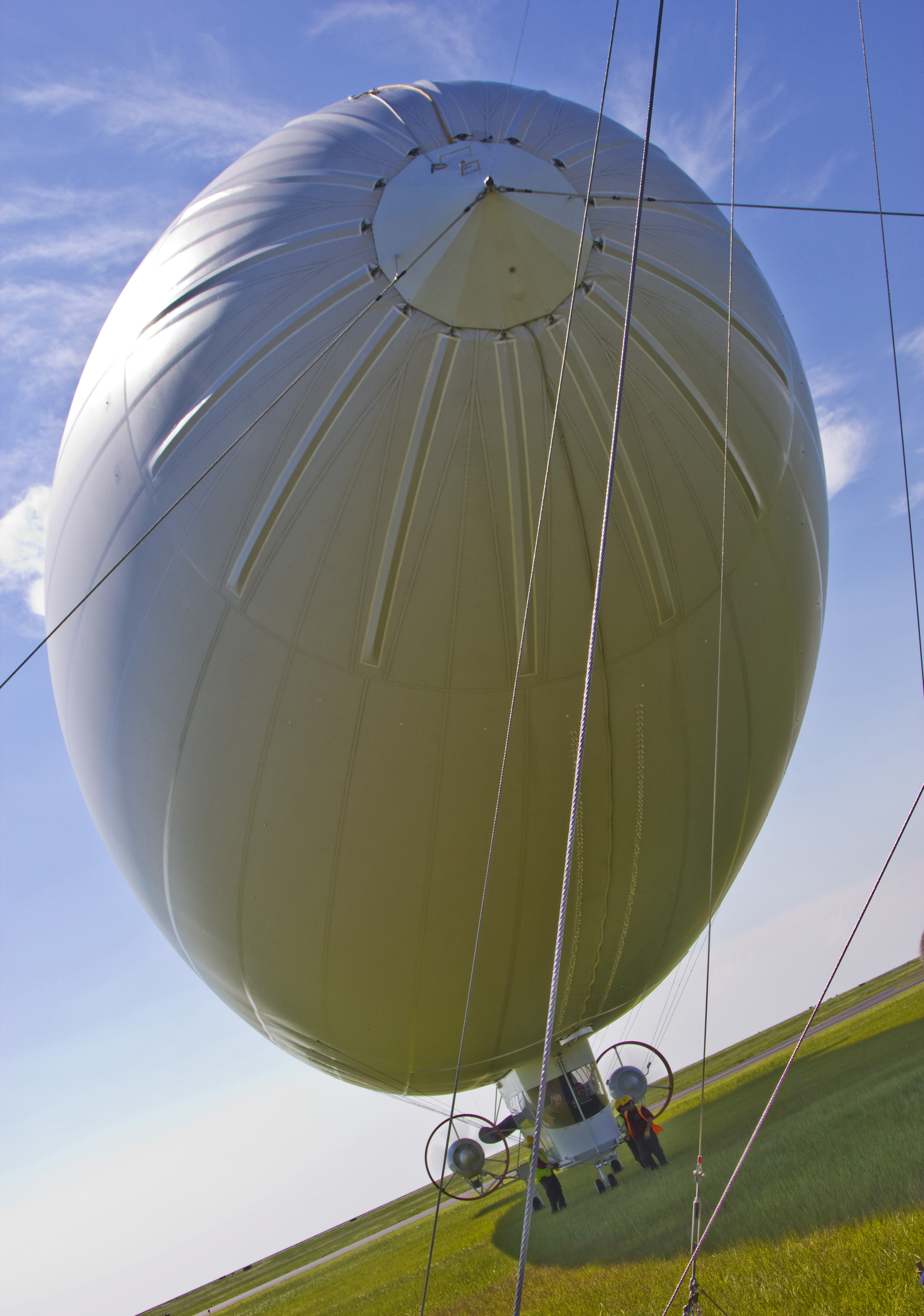
Ship at Lake Front Airport, New Orleans, Louisiana in July 2010.

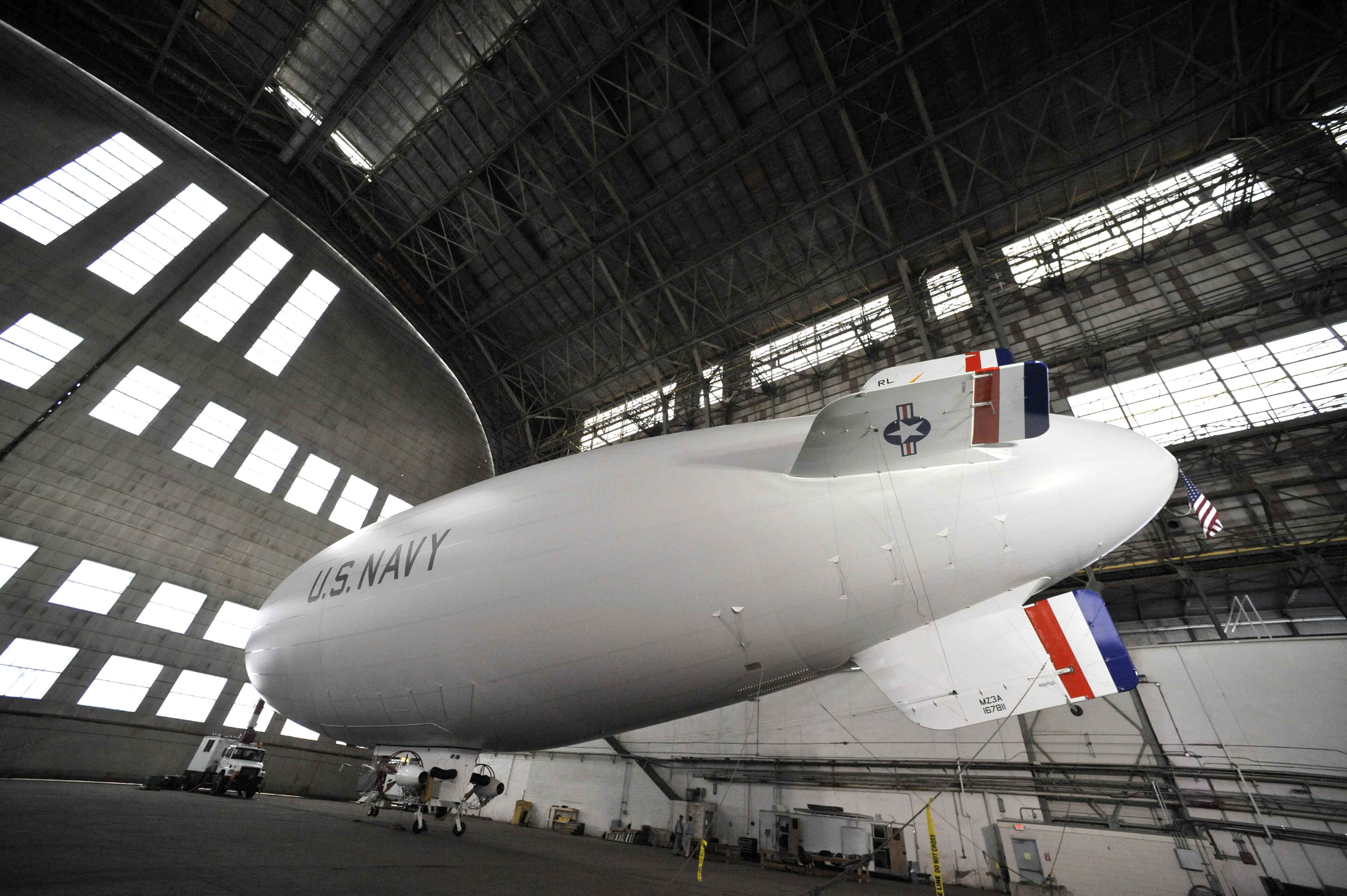
At a ribbon-cutting event, 26 October 2011, at the Naval Air Warfare Center Aircraft Division (NAWCAD), Lakehurst, New Jersey, the MZ-3A airship bears the newly adorned insignia of Scientific Development Squadron ONE (VXS-1), and the banner of the U.S. Navy.

The American Blimp MZ-3A is a blimp owned by the United States Navy from 2006 to 2017. It is a modified American Blimp Corporation A-170 series commercial blimp and given the USN type/model/series (T/M/S) designation MZ-3A and Bureau Number (BuNo) 167811. After delivery to the Navy, the airship began operations as an advanced flying laboratory used to evaluate affordable sensor payloads, the development of new lighter-than-air (LTA) technologies and general flight support for other related research and development/science and technology (R&D/S&T) projects. As of 2023, it was the last airship to be operated by the U. S. military.

== Description ==
The airship is propeller-driven by two 180 hp (130 kW) Lycoming engines, providing a maximum cruise speed of just under 50 kn (93 km/h). The crewed 178-foot LTA craft has an operational payload capability of up to 2,500 lb (1,100 kg) and can remain aloft and nearly stationary for more than twelve hours, performing various missions in support of technology development for Command, Control, Communications, Computers, Intelligence, Surveillance and Reconnaissance (C4ISR) concepts.

== History ==
In May 2006, Air Test and Evaluation Squadron TWENTY, Lighter-than-Air Vehicle (LTAV) Detachment (VX-20 LTAV Det) began regular flight operations from Naval Air Engineering Station Lakehurst located in Lakehurst, New Jersey. In 2007 flight operations were halted and the ship stored in Hangar Six at NAES Lakehurst.

In October 2009, the MZ-3A was transferred to the United States Naval Research Laboratory Military Support Division's Scientific Development Squadron One (VXS-1), formerly known as the Flight Support Detachment, located at Naval Air Station Patuxent River, Maryland.

The airship resumed flight operations in March, 2010 with test flights at Marine Corps Air Station Yuma, Arizona.

The MZ-3A was a government owned / contractor operated (GOCO) airship operated by a civilian contractor, Integrated Systems Solutions, Inc. (ISSI) of California. ISSI maintained and operated the blimp employing Navy approved, highly qualified, commercial blimp pilots to command the airship.

On 5 July 2010, the MZ-3A was re-deployed to the Jack Edwards National Airport in Gulf Shores, Alabama to assist in the Deepwater Horizon oil spill recovery operation.

At a ribbon-cutting ceremony on 26 October 2011 at the Naval Air Warfare Center Aircraft Division, NAES Lakehurst, New Jersey, and in recognition of the Centennial of Naval Aviation, the Navy unveiled a fresh identity for the MZ-3A. Emblazoned with red, white and blue striped rudders reminiscent of the Navy's airships just prior to World War II, the airship also carries the insignia of the VXS-1 Warlocks and the banner of the U.S. Navy.

In February 2012, four months after its formal acceptance by the Navy, the MZ-3A airship was at Joint Base McGuire-Dix-Lakehurst, New Jersey. It was planned to be deflated and stored, and the program suspended until future missions warranted its re-activation.

In March 2012, days after the decision to suspend, the program got a reprieve for at least another 3–6 months of operations. The MZ-3A was still in operation as of March 2013, providing C4ISR capabilities demonstrations in Florida for U.S. Naval Forces Southern Command/U.S. 4th Fleet.

In October 2017, the Navy sold the MZ-3A to the Florida-based AirSign Airship Group.

Skyship Services now owns the ship, with Aircraft Registration Number N157LG.

== See also ==
- List of airships of the United States Navy
