= Skystar =

Skystar or SkyStar may refer to:

- Skyfly S-34 Skystar, a Swiss ultralight aircraft
- Skystar 300, an Israeli surveillance blimp
- SkyStar Movies, is a Bollywood based movies channel
- SkyStar Aircraft, a defunct American aircraft manufacturer that operated between 1992 and 2005
- SkyStar Airways, a Thai airline
- SkyStar Wheel, a mobile Ferris wheel currently in San Francisco, California
