= American Blimp A-170 =

Airship

A-170
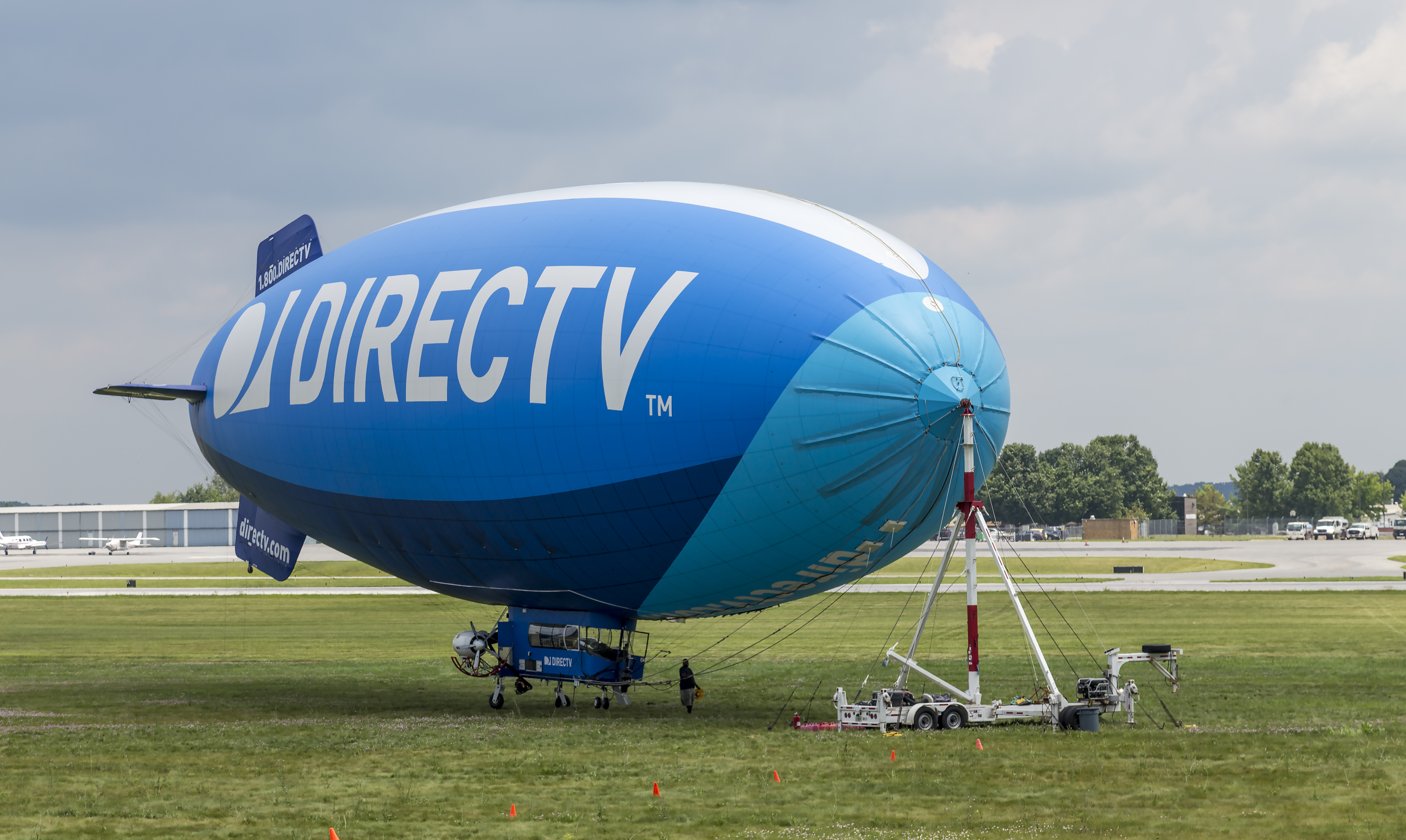
- A-170 in Maryland in 2014

General information
- Type: Non-rigid airship
- National origin: United States
- Manufacturer: American Blimp Corporation

History
- Variants: American Blimp MZ-3

The American Blimp A-170 is a blimp series built by the American Blimp Corporation now owned and operated by the Airsign Airship Group.

== Holden Airship ==
The Holden Airship (nicknamed "the Holdenberg" by Australian news media) was a promotional gimmick operated by Australian car manufacturer Holden. The lightship was painted in the distinctive red and white livery of Holden and is flown at various outdoor events, such as Tertiary Open Day in Canberra, Australian Capital Territory, on 25 August 2007 (see picture).

In late September 2007, The Holden Airship was decommissioned and flown back on an 22 hour journey to the US.

== MZ-3 ==
From 2006 to 2017, a modified A-170 was operated by the United States Navy as an advanced flying laboratory, designated MZ-3A.

== Specifications ==
Data from

General characteristics

- Crew: One
- Capacity: 9 adults plus pilot (crew 17)
- Length: 178 ft 2 in (54.3 m)
- Diameter: 45 ft 11 in (14 m) envelope
- Height: 55 ft 1 in (16.8 m) including gondola
- Volume: 170,297.4 cu ft (4,822.285 m^{3})
- Useful lift: 12,311 lb (5,584 kg)
- Lifting agent: Helium
- Gondola length: 8 m (26 ft 3 in)
- Gondola width: 6.2 m (20 ft 4 in)
- Gondola height: 3.3 m (10 ft 10 in)
- Cabin length: 5.5 m (18 ft 1 in)
- Cabin width: 1.5 m (4 ft 11 in)
- Cabin height: 2 m (6 ft 7 in)
- Lightsign length: 21.3 m (69 ft 11 in)
- Lightsign height: 9.1 m (29 ft 10 in)
- Lightsign Diagonal: 914 in (23,200 mm)
- Lightsign Illumination: 369,600 LEDs + Internal illumination from two 1kW lights for night operation.
- Powerplant: 2 × Lycoming IO-360-B1G6 4-cyl. air-cooled horizontally opposed piston engines, 180 hp (130 kW) each

Performance

- Maximum speed: 45 kn (52 mph, 84 km/h)
- Cruise speed: 40 kn (46 mph, 74 km/h)
- Range: 220 nmi (250 mi, 400 km)
- Rate of climb: 1,394 ft/min (7.08 m/s)
