= Goodyear GZ-20 =

Airship

GZ-20
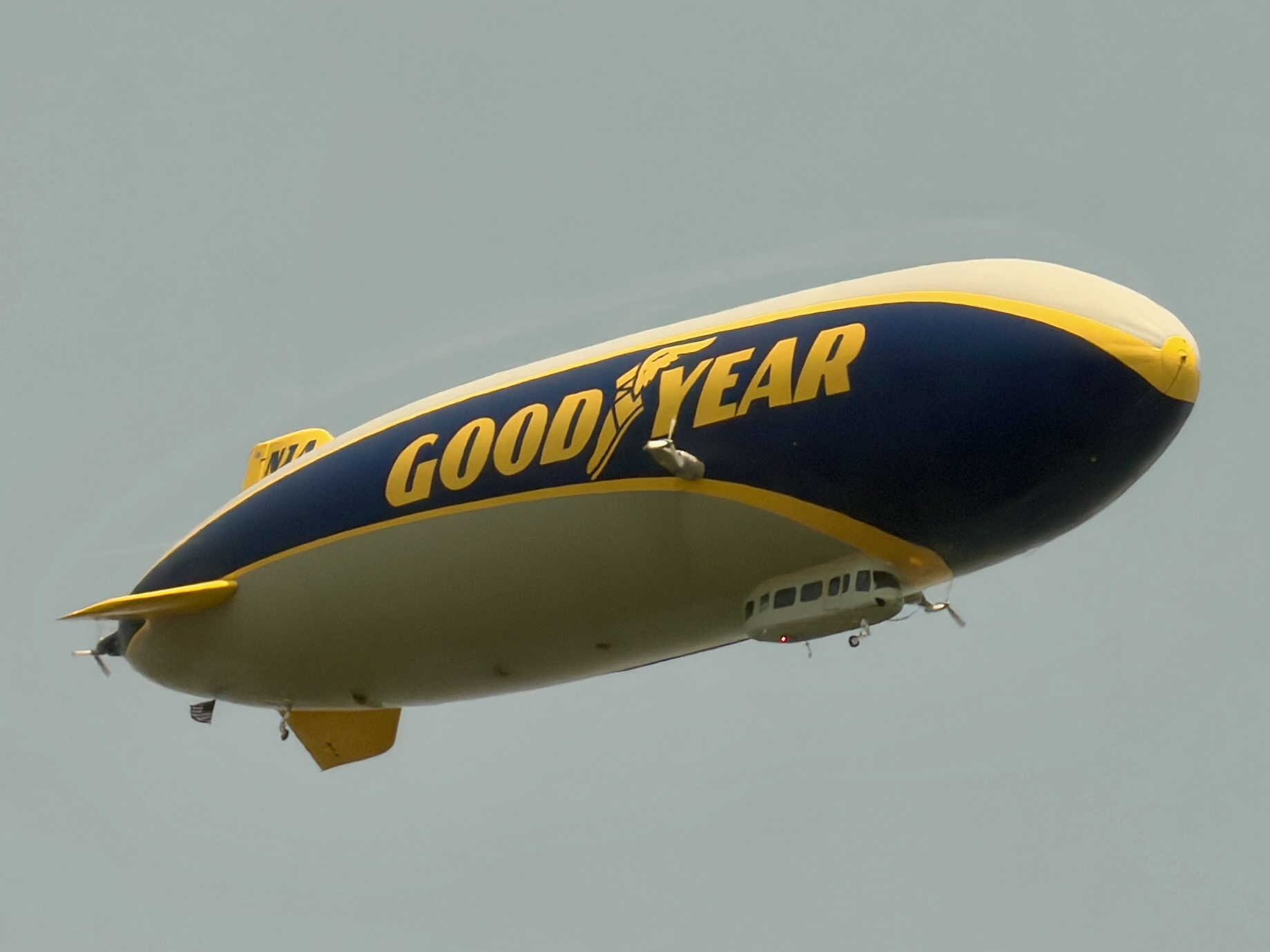
- The Spirit of Goodyear (N3A)

General information
- Type: Blimp (non-rigid airship)
- National origin: United States
- Manufacturer: Goodyear Aerospace
- Status: Retired
- Primary user: Goodyear Tire and Rubber Company

History
- Introduction date: 1969
- Retired: 2017

The Goodyear GZ-20/20A was a class of non-rigid airship or blimp introduced in 1969 by The Goodyear Tire and Rubber Company in the United States as its signature promotional aircraft, the Goodyear Blimp. The design is based on the previous Goodyear GZ-19 class. The GZ-20 featured a larger envelope to carry the "Super-Skytacular" advertising night sign and more powerful engines. The GZ-20s were the mainstay of Goodyear's airship operations until 2017, when they were replaced with the new Zeppelin NT semi-rigid airship.

== Operational history ==
The GZ-20 was introduced as part of a US$4 million expansion program by Goodyear in 1968 that included the construction of a new GZ-19 Florida-based airship (Mayflower N1A), replacement of the California-based GZ-19 with a GZ-20 (Columbia N3A), adding a third airship to the fleet (GZ-20 America N10A) and constructing a new airship base at Spring, Texas as home to the new blimp.

In 1972, a third GZ-20 was built to be the first Goodyear Blimp stationed outside the United States. Christened Europa N2A. her structural elements were freighted from the Goodyear factory in Akron, Ohio to the Royal Aircraft Establishment in Cardington, Bedfordshire, England on an Aero Spacelines Mini Guppy to be erected there but based at a new facility at Capena, Italy near Rome.

In 1978, the GZ-19 class was retired after the loss of Mayflower N38A due to a tornado. In 1979, Mayflower was replaced by the GZ-20 Enterprise N1A. As of 2017, all three of Goodyear's remaining GZ-20As have been decommissioned.

The blimp received a Guinness World Record for the longest continuous operated airship with fourteen years of service.

Goodyear Airship Operations started production of Zeppelin NT semi-rigid airships beginning in 2013 at the cost of approximately US$21 million per airship. Goodyear's first Zeppelin NT first took flight on March 17, 2014.

After 14 years in the skies, on February 23, 2014, Spirit of Goodyear was retired in Pompano Beach after the 2014 Daytona 500. The Spirit of Goodyear's gondola was donated to the Crawford Auto-Aviation Museum in Cleveland, Ohio.

On August 10, 2015, the California-based GZ-20, the Spirit of America, was decommissioned after 13 years of operation. In September 2015, Spirit of Innovation, the world's only remaining active GZ-20, was relocated to Carson, California from its former base in Pompano Beach, Florida. The gondola from Spirit of America was donated to the Planes of Fame Air Museum in Chino, California.

On March 14, 2017, Spirit of Innovation was retired and dismantled in the former US Navy blimp hangar at Tustin, California. The gondola is stored at Goodyear's Wingfoot Lake Airship Base in Suffield, Ohio. Wingfoot Two, Goodyear's newest Zeppelin NT, has taken over operations in California, but Wingfoot Three, the third Goodyear blimp has been moved to the base, and WT has been relocated to Pompano Beach, Florida.

== Surviving aircraft ==
As of October 2018, there are 5 GZ-20 gondolas stored or on display in the United States.

C-49

- C-49, named as the Columbia N4A, is currently on display, mostly restored and equipped with engine nacelles and landing gear, at the Steven F. Udvar-Hazy Center in Chantilly, Virginia.

4116

- 4116, named as the Stars and Stripes, which crashed in 2005, was donated to the EAA Aviation Museum in Oshkosh, Wisconsin in 2025.

4117

- 4117, named as the Spirit of America, is on display at the Planes of Fame Air Museum in Chino, California.

4118

- 4118, named as the Spirit of Goodyear, is on display at the Crawford Auto-Aviation Museum in Cleveland, Ohio.

4119

- 4119, named as the Spirit of Innovation, is stored at the Wingfoot Lake Hangar in Suffield Township, Portage County, Ohio.

== Specifications (Europa) ==
Data from Jane's All The World's Aircraft 1976–77

General characteristics

- Crew: One pilot
- Capacity: 6 passengers
- Length: 192 ft 6 in (58.67 m)
- Diameter: 45 ft 11 in (14.00 m)
- Width: 50 ft 0 in (15.24 m)
- Height: 59 ft 6 in (18.14 m)
- Volume: 202,700 cu ft (5,740 m^{3})
- Empty weight: 9,375 lb (4,252 kg)
- Gross weight: 12,840 lb (5,824 kg)
- Powerplant: 2 × Continental IO-360-D , 210 hp (157 kW) each

Performance

- Maximum speed: 50 mph (80 km/h, 43 kn)
- Endurance: 23 hours
- Service ceiling: 7,500 ft (2,285 m)
- Rate of climb: 2,400 ft/min (12.2 m/s)
