= Mantainer Ardath =

Australian non-rigid airship

Ardath

General information
- Type: Airship
- National origin: Australia
- Manufacturer: Mantainer Pty Ltd
- Designer: Tony Norton
- Primary user: Ardath
- Number built: 1

History
- First flight: 1977

The Mantainer Ardath is a non-rigid airship designed and built in Australia during the 1970s.

== Design and development ==
The airship was developed by Melbourne businessman Tony Norton in the mid-1970s. The project involved 10,000 person-hours; planning and design of the airship took two years, construction itself took just a year. Flight tests commenced at Tocumwal, NSW at the end of June 1977. It is named for the W.D. & H.O. Wills-manufactured Ardath cigarettes, whose logo is on each side of the envelope.

The company Mantainer Pty Ltd was formed in connection to the airship project. In addition to its advertising role, Mantainer also intended to deploy the airship in surveillance, and in search and rescue duties. It was given the Australian civil aircraft registration of VH-PSE.

According to Flypast : a record of aviation in Australia, by December 1978 the company had been placed in liquidation, with the airship being sold to an American buyer. This was the firm U.S. Airships Inc, based in Tyler, Texas. A hangar specifically intended for the airship was erected in Tyler, the airship rebuilt, however a lack of capital meant that the venture soon folded.

=== Norton Snoopy ===
The Snoopy was a small human-powered non-rigid airship, designed and built by Norton. It flew on 27 February 1976. The envelope was constructed using metallic 1 mil Mylar film. It was a precursor of the Ardath.

=== Ardath ===
The airship is conventional in appearance and configuration. It has a helium-filled envelope, with ballonets fore-and-aft. The ballonets can be inflated by airscoops situated in the slipstream from the propellers. The gondola is suspended underneath the envelope via catenary curtains. The gondola is of light alloy construction, and has a single non-retractable landing wheel. There are four stabilising fins, arranged in a cruciform pattern. The rudder is located on the lower fin, with elevators being fitted to both horizontal stabilisers.

== Specifications ==
Data from Jane's All the World's Aircraft 1977-78

General characteristics

- Length: 26.82 m (88 ft 0 in)
- Diameter: 7.32 m (24 ft 0 in)
- Height: 9.14 m (30 ft 0 in)
- Volume: 633.9 m^{3} (22,390 cu ft) gross
- Powerplant: 2 × Xenoah G50B two-cylinder two-stroke air-cooled piston engines, 34 kW (45 hp) each
- Propellers: 2-bladed Perfectus metal fixed-pitch propellers

Performance

- Maximum speed: 89 km/h (55 mph, 48 kn)
- Cruise speed: 70 km/h (44 mph, 38 kn)
- Range: 280 km (170 mi, 150 nmi)
- Service ceiling: 1,100 m (3,500 ft)

== Bibliography ==
- "Australian Dirigible". Aircraft Engineering and Aerospace Technology. 48 (11): 17–18. November 1976.
