= Goodyear Blimp =

Airship fleet used for promotional purposes

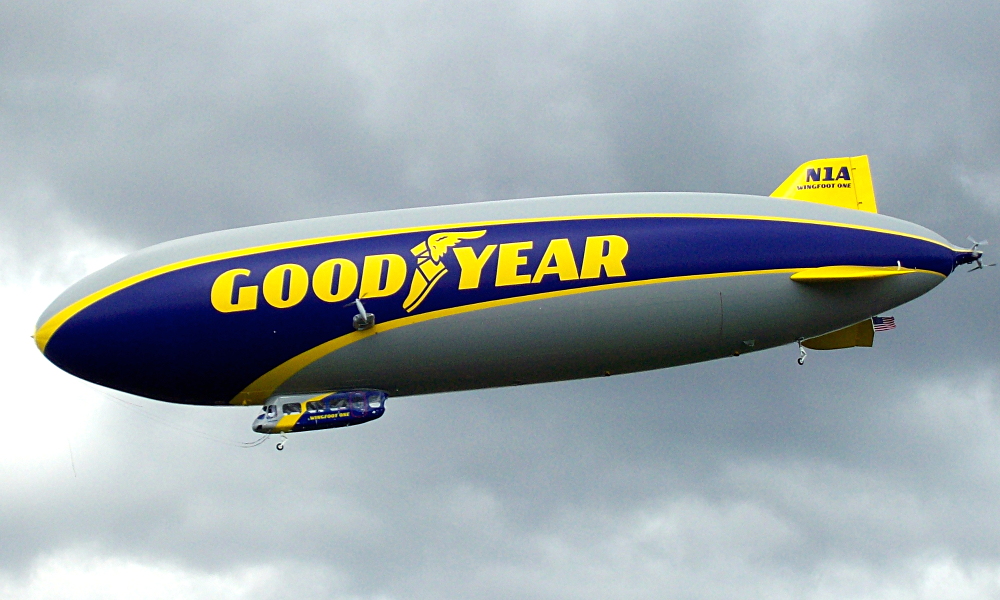
Wingfoot One is not actually a blimp (non-rigid airship), but rather a semi-rigid airship built by the Zeppelin Company.

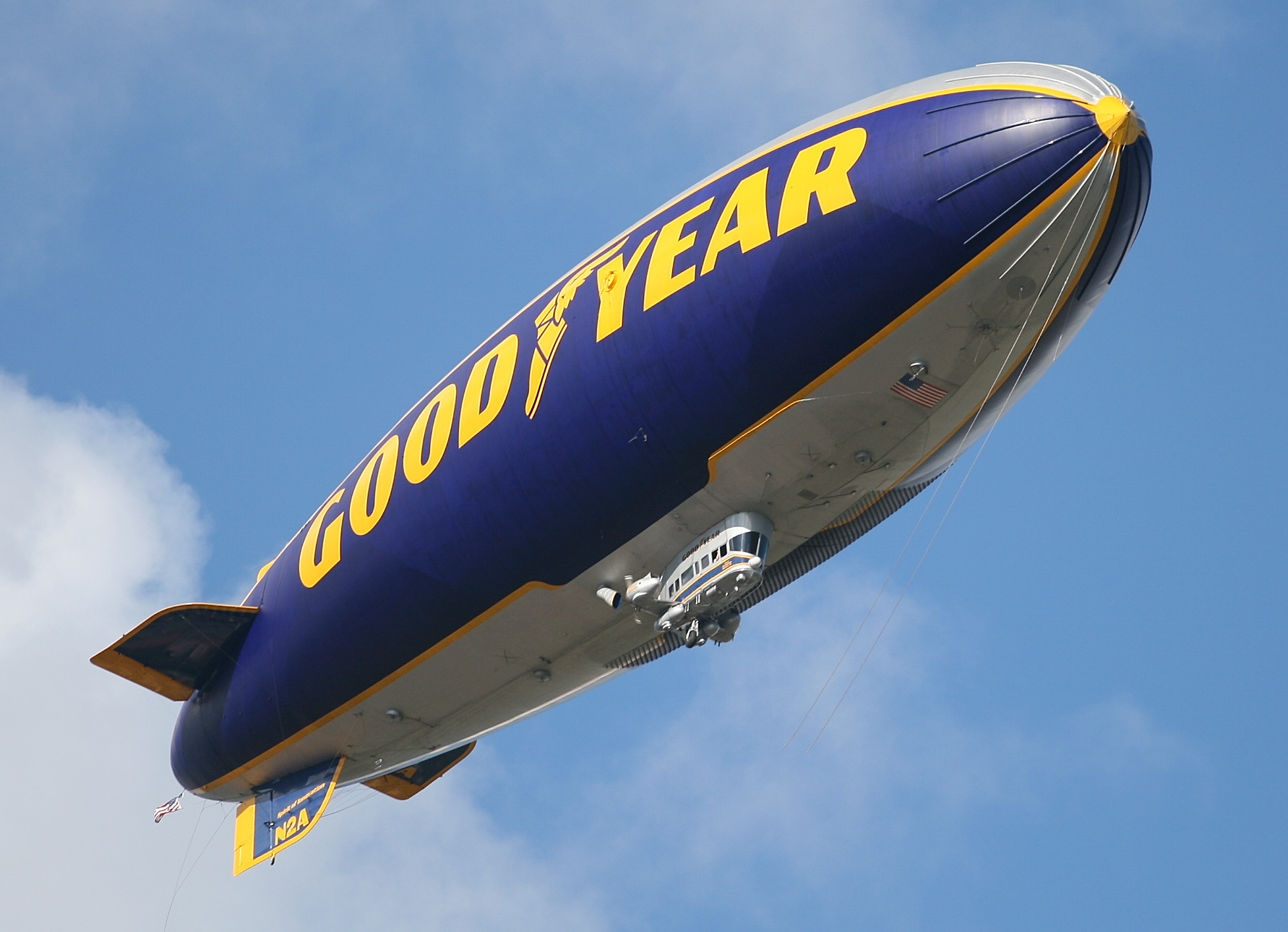
Spirit of Innovation, Goodyear's last true blimp, was retired on March 14, 2017.

The Goodyear Blimp is any one of a fleet (currently 4 in number) of commercial airships operated by the Goodyear Tire and Rubber Company, used mainly for advertising and broadcasting aerial views of live sports events for television. The term blimp itself is defined as a non-rigid airship—without any internal structure, the pressure of lifting gas within the airship envelope maintains the vessel's shape.

Goodyear built hundreds of airships throughout much of the 20th century, mostly for the United States Navy. Beginning with the Pilgrim in 1925, Goodyear also built blimps for its own commercial fleet. In 1987, a hostile takeover bid forced Goodyear to sell its subsidiary Goodyear Aerospace, eventually ending the company's construction of lighter-than-air craft. The last blimp built by Goodyear, Spirit of Innovation, was retired in 2017.

Beginning in 2014, Goodyear replaced its three U.S. blimps with three new semi-rigid airships; built by the Luftschiffbau Zeppelin company, each have a rigid internal frame. Although technically incorrect, Goodyear continues to use "blimp" in reference to these new semi-rigid models. Wingfoot One, the first such model in Goodyear's U.S. fleet, was christened on August 23, 2014, at the Wingfoot Lake Airship Hangar, near the company's world headquarters in Akron, Ohio.

== Airship fleet ==
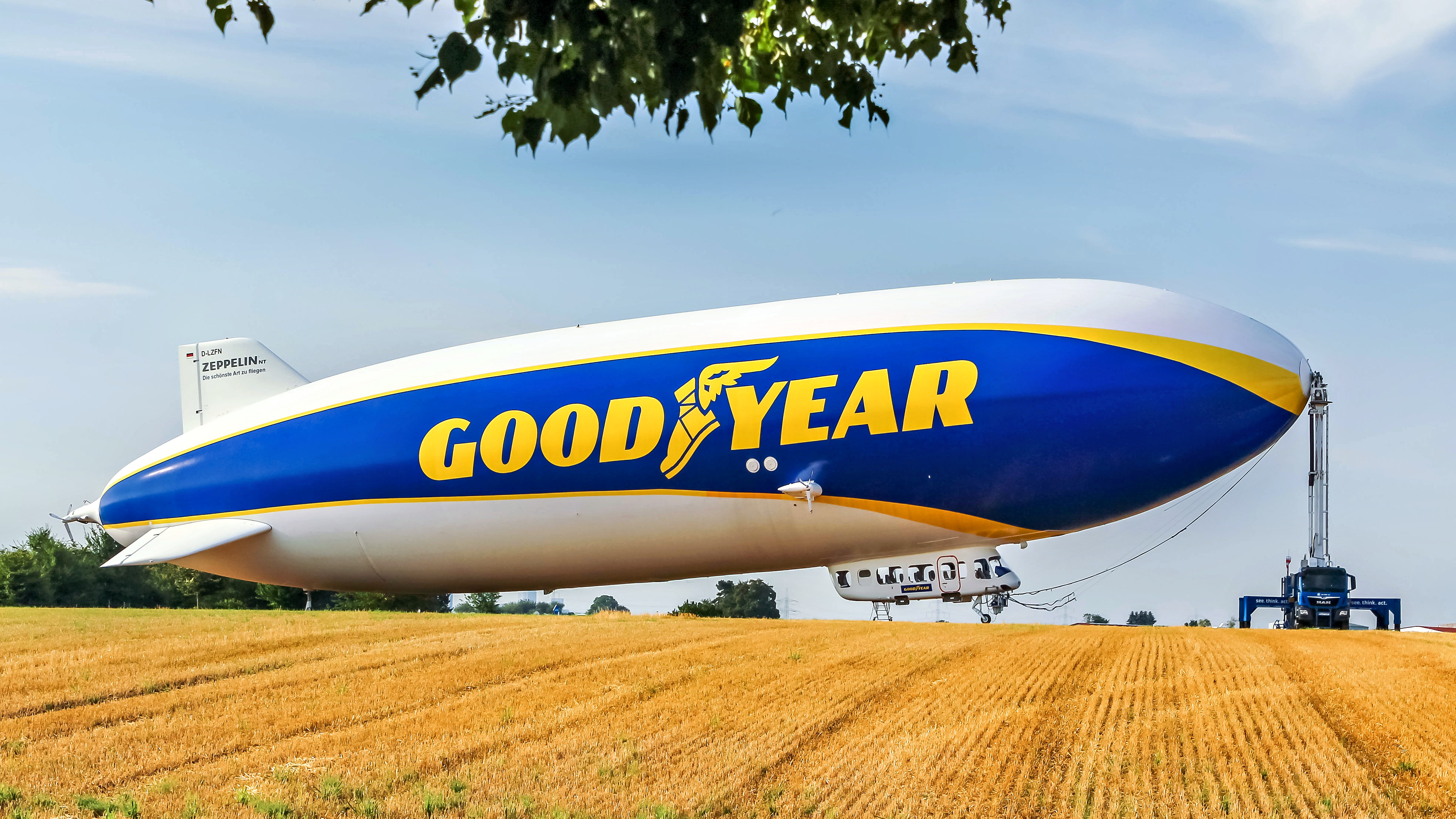
Zeppelin NT D-LZFN (2024)

In May 2011, Goodyear announced it was replacing its fleet of non-rigid airships with three semi-rigid airships built by Luftschiffbau Zeppelin.

Goodyear's U.S. fleet consists of three semi-rigid airships (model LZ N07-101):

- Wingfoot One (N1A), based in Wingfoot Lake Airship Operations Balloonport (FAA LID: 4OH6) in Suffield, Ohio
- Wingfoot Two (N2A), based in Pompano Beach Airpark (IATA: PPM, ICAO: KPMP, FAA LID: PMP) in Pompano Beach, Florida
- Wingfoot Three (N3A), based in Goodyear Blimp Base Airport (FAA LID: 64CL) in Carson, California

There is one operational Goodyear blimp in Europe based near the Zeppelin construction plant and home airfield in Ludwigshafen, Germany

- Goodyear Zeppelin (D-LZFN) based in Friedrichshafen (IATA: FDH) with public flights during the favorable season and flight condition

The new airships are 246 feet (75 meters) long, 52 feet (16 meters) longer than Goodyear's old model, the GZ-20. The Zeppelin NT model is also slimmer, has a top speed of 70 miles per hour (110 kilometers per hour) (versus 50 miles per hour (80 kilometers per hour) for the blimp), and has a passenger gondola that seats 12 (compared to seven in the blimp). The gondola also contains a restroom. Both craft are outfitted with LED displays (called "Eaglevision" by Goodyear) that can render bright, multi-colored, animated messages and images.

Goodyear has also leased blimps operating in other parts of the world. These airships were built and operated by The Lightship Group of Orlando, Florida. In 2012, The Lightship Group was acquired (along with the American Blimp Corporation) by Van Wagner Communications LLC, and operated as the Van Wagner Airship Group until November 17, 2017, when it was purchased by Airsign Inc. They currently operate an airship for Goodyear in China.

== Lifting agent ==
The Goodyear blimps are inflated with helium. The helium is maintained under low pressure, so small punctures do not pose serious consequences for the blimp. One inspection element of the blimps is to look into the envelope for pinpoints of light which are indicative of small holes.

Prior to the Zeppelin NT, the Goodyear blimps were non-rigid (meaning their shape is not maintained by a rigid internal structure) dirigibles (directable/steerable airships). Inside their exterior envelope, the blimps are fitted with air-filled ballonets. As the blimp ascends or descends, the internal ballonets expand or contract to compensate for density changes and to maintain uniform pressure in the envelope. The latest Goodyear airship, the Zeppelin NT, is a departure from this convention, as it is a semi-rigid airship that makes use of a truss inside the envelope to provide some of its strength.

== Models ==
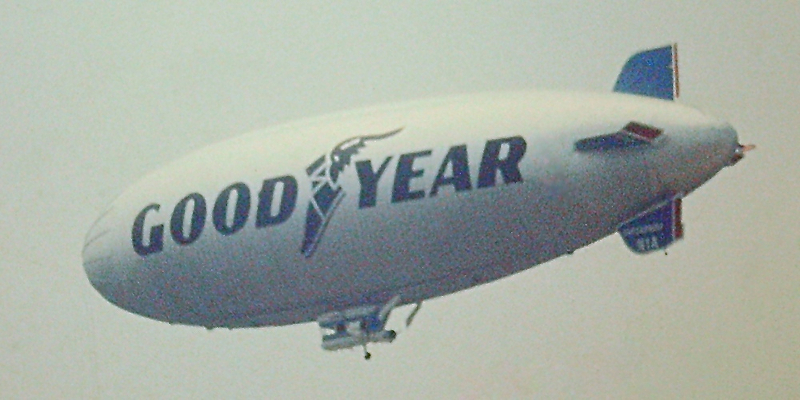
Enterprise (N1A), a model GZ-20 blimp, flies over the 1981 Indianapolis 500. Goodyear replaced the fleet's old color scheme in 1991.

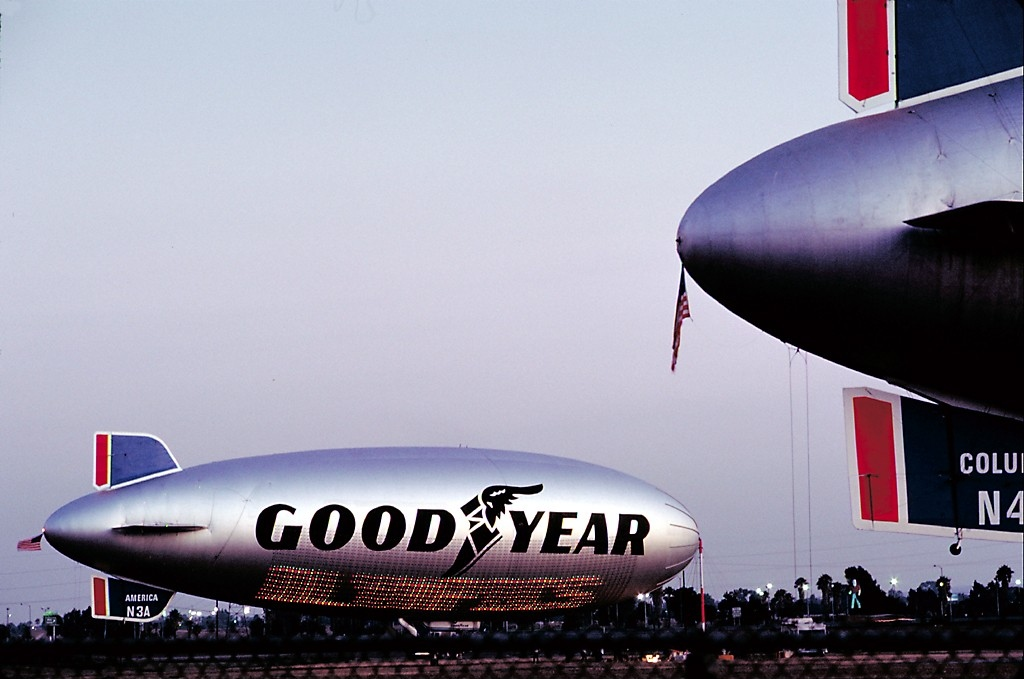
America (N3A) and Columbia (N4A) are moored in preparation for the 1984 Summer Olympics.

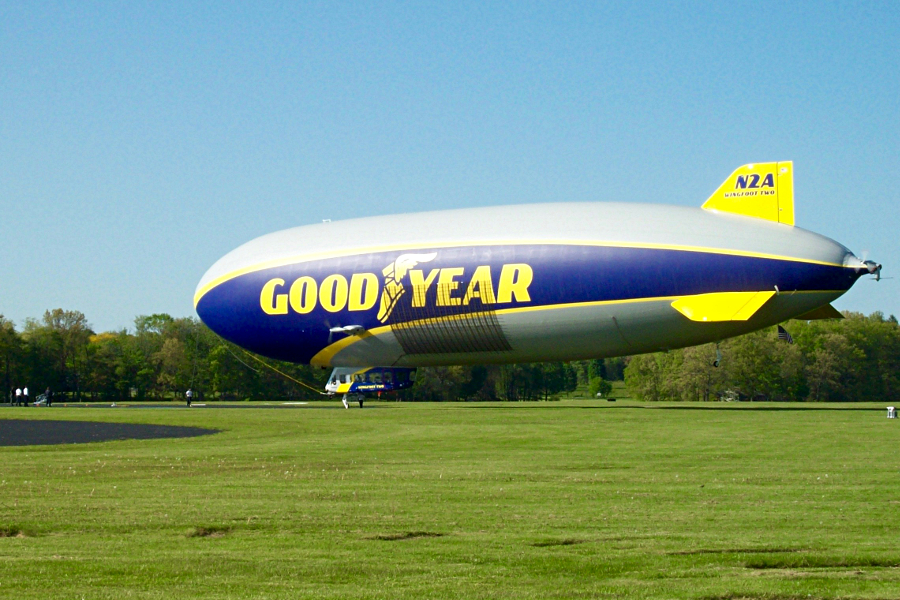
Wingfoot Two (N2A), a model LZ N07-101 semi-rigid airship, takes off to provide aerial coverage of the 2016 NBA playoffs.

"GZ" stands for Goodyear–Zeppelin, stemming from the partnership Goodyear had with the German company when both were building airships together. However, these models came many years after this partnership had dissolved during the start of World War II. The GZ-1 was the USS Akron (ZRS-4), the U.S. Navy's fourth rigid airship used for several tests including as a flying "aircraft carrier".

- GZ-19/19A: Introduced in 1959 with the Mayflower (N4A) and discontinued in 1979 after the Mayflower (N38A) was destroyed by windstorms and thunderstorms. The design for this class is similar to the L class blimp built by Goodyear for the U.S. Navy.
- GZ-20/20A: This class was introduced in 1969, with America (N10A) and Columbia (N3A) being the first two. The Europa (N2A) followed in 1972 and was based in Italy, the first Goodyear blimp based outside the United States. These airships were larger than the GZ 19 blimps. Beginning in 2014, Goodyear began retiring the GZ-20 and replacing them with the Zeppelin NT. On February 23, 2014, Spirit of Goodyear was retired in Pompano Beach after the 2014 Daytona 500. On August 10, 2015, the California-based GZ-20, the Spirit of America, was decommissioned. The Spirit of Innovation took over California operations in September 2015 until its retirement in March 2017 as the last remaining GZ-20. In October 2017, Wingfoot Two was relocated from Akron to California.
- GZ-22: The only airship in this class was the Spirit of Akron (N4A). Originally built in 1987 to show the U.S. Department of Defense that airships were still militarily viable, it was the most technically advanced airship Goodyear ever had in its public relations fleet, featuring fly-by-wire technology. However, Spirit of Akron was destroyed in a crash in 1999 and the company has not built one since, most likely because of the increase in manufacturing and operating expenses due to its advanced technology.
- LZ N07-101: In May 2011, Goodyear announced that it would be replacing its aging fleet of GZ-20 blimps (non-rigid airships) with Zeppelin NT airships. Construction began in 2012 on the first of three new semi-rigid airships; completed in March 2014, Wingfoot One was christened on August 23, 2014, by Good Morning America anchor Robin Roberts. Wingfoot Two, Goodyear's second semi-rigid airship, was unveiled in April 2016. The fleet was completed in 2018. Shaesta Waiz, the youngest woman to fly solo around the world, christened Wingfoot Three during an August 30 ceremony in Akron, with the traditional smashing of a bottle of champagne across the bow. "Wingfoot Three will serve as a beacon for me to continue my work inspiring and celebrating aviation with others," said Waiz. She joined a list of other famous Goodyear airship christeners, including Amelia Earhart and astronaut Sally Ride.

=== Historical navy classes ===
- C class blimp 1918–1919
- D class blimp 1920–1924
- F class blimp/Type FB 1918–1923
- Goodyear Type AD 1925–1931
- G class blimp 1935–19?
- H class blimp 1921–1923
- J class blimp 1922–1940
- K class blimp 1938–1959, WWII anti-submarine, post-war tests
  - K-1 1938–1940, pre-war experimental
- L class blimp 1930s–1945, WWII
- M class blimp 1944–1956
- N class blimp 1950s–1962
- Goodyear ZWG 1950s

== Dimensions ==
According to the Goodyear website, the now retired GZ 19 and 19A blimps were 150 and 157 feet (46 and 48 meters) long respectively, and the GZ-20/20A blimps were 192 feet (59 meters) long, 59.5 feet (18.1 meters) tall, and 50 feet (15 meters) wide. For comparison, the largest airships ever built, the Zeppelin company's Hindenburg, LZ-129, and the Graf Zeppelin II, LZ-130, were both 804 feet (245 meters) long and 135 feet (41 meters) in diameter. That is, over four times as long and over twice as wide as the current Goodyear blimps. The largest blimp ever made by Goodyear was the U.S. Navy's ZPG-3, at 403 feet (123 meters) in length.

== Names ==
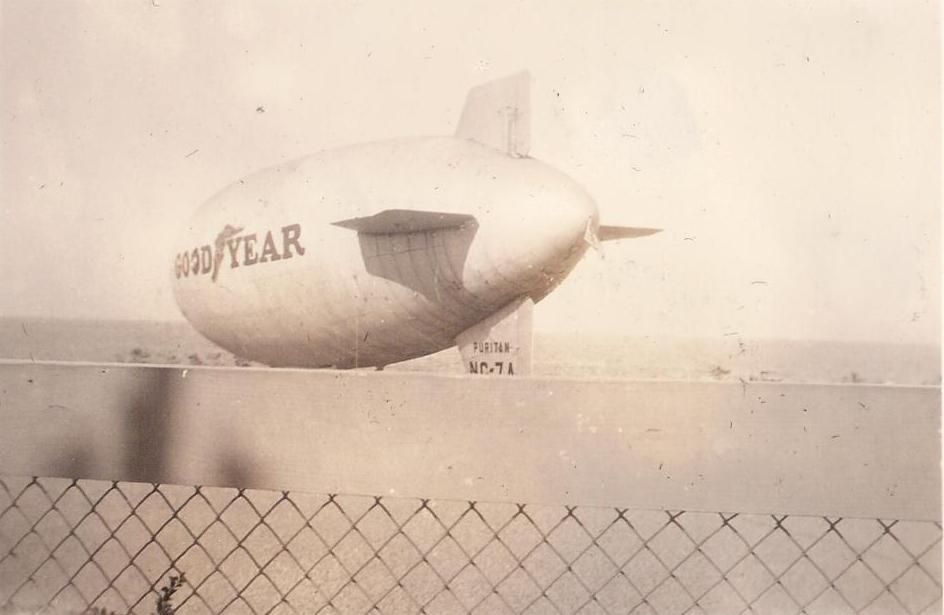
Puritan (NC7A) at the 1933 Chicago World's Fair

Since 1928, Goodyear had traditionally named its blimps after the U.S. winners of the America's Cup yacht race. This naming method is attributed to then-Goodyear CEO P. W. Litchfield, who viewed the airships as "aerial yachts". Although that practice deviated with the introduction of the Spirit of Akron in 1987, the tradition ended with the Florida-based Stars & Stripes in 2005.

In 2006, Goodyear began having the public participate in the naming of their airships; they dubbed this the "Name the Blimp" contest. Spirit of Innovation was the first airship to be named by the public.

America's Cup winners' names: Puritan, Reliance, Defender, Volunteer, Resolute, Vigilant, Mayflower, Ranger, Rainbow, Enterprise, Columbia, America, Stars & Stripes.

Non-cup winners' names: Pilgrim, Neponset, Spirit of Akron, Spirit of Goodyear, Eagle, Spirit of America, Spirit of Innovation, Wingfoot One, Wingfoot Two.

Foreign-based blimps have been operated by The Lightship Group since the 1990s: Europa, Spirit of Europe, Spirit of the South Pacific, Spirit of the Americas, Spirit of Safety, Ventura, Ling Hang Zhe (Navigator).

== Passenger policy ==
The only passengers that Goodyear currently allows on the blimps are corporate guests of the company and members of the press. No public rides have been offered for many years; however, for over 50 years, limited public rides were available on the blimps based on Watson Island in Miami, Florida as a condition of Goodyear's land-lease deal with the city to operate from the island. That practice ended in 1979 when Goodyear moved the blimp base to Opa-locka, Florida.

During the period in which Goodyear supplied tires for IndyCar, it was a tradition that the pole position winner at the Indianapolis 500 would get a ride in the blimp in the days leading up to the race.

During the period in which Goodyear was a corporate sponsor of the All American Soap Box Derby, the winners of the World Championship races held each July in Akron, Ohio were awarded a ride in the blimp. Typically these rides were given on the day following the annual race, but if weather conditions prohibited the blimp from flying on that day, the champions were given an award letter from Goodyear. This served as a lifetime ticket for one blimp ride to be taken whenever arrangements could be made between all parties involved.

"As part of the blimp’s 100-year anniversary celebration, {in 2025}, Goodyear is giving three U.S. residents a chance to join the exclusive club and win a ride."

The European Goodyear blimp is operated by Deutsche Zeppelin-Reederei, a commercial passenger flight operator, and the Goodyear Zeppelin NT is regularly used for public flights around Germany outside of sport seasons.

== Night signs ==
For years, Goodyear has fitted its blimps with a night sign. From neon tubes, to incandescent lamps to LEDs, these signs have helped the company advertise its products and also deliver public service messages from various organizations such as local governments.

- Neon-O-Gram: Originally called NeonGoodyear, was first fitted on Defender in the 1930s. Neon tubes on the sides of the blimp which usually spelled out 'Goodyear'.
- Trans-Lux: Installed in 1947 on both sides of the Puritan. Ten panels, each holding 182 incandescent lamps, with 18-foot letters.
- Skytacular: In the mid-1960s, the GZ-19 Mayflower (N4A) was fitted with over 3,000 incandescent lamps of red, yellow, blue and green on both sides that for the first time featured animation. Usually moving stick figures, ticker messages or colorful patterns. A small gas turbine had to be attached to the blimp's car in order to power the Skytacular night sign.
- Super Skytacular: Same technology as Skytacular, but with more than 7,000 lamps on both sides. Super Skytacular was fitted on the new longer GZ-20 blimps in 1969.
- EagleVision: Uses a computer-driven system to create video displays with more than 80,000 LEDs.

== Accidents ==
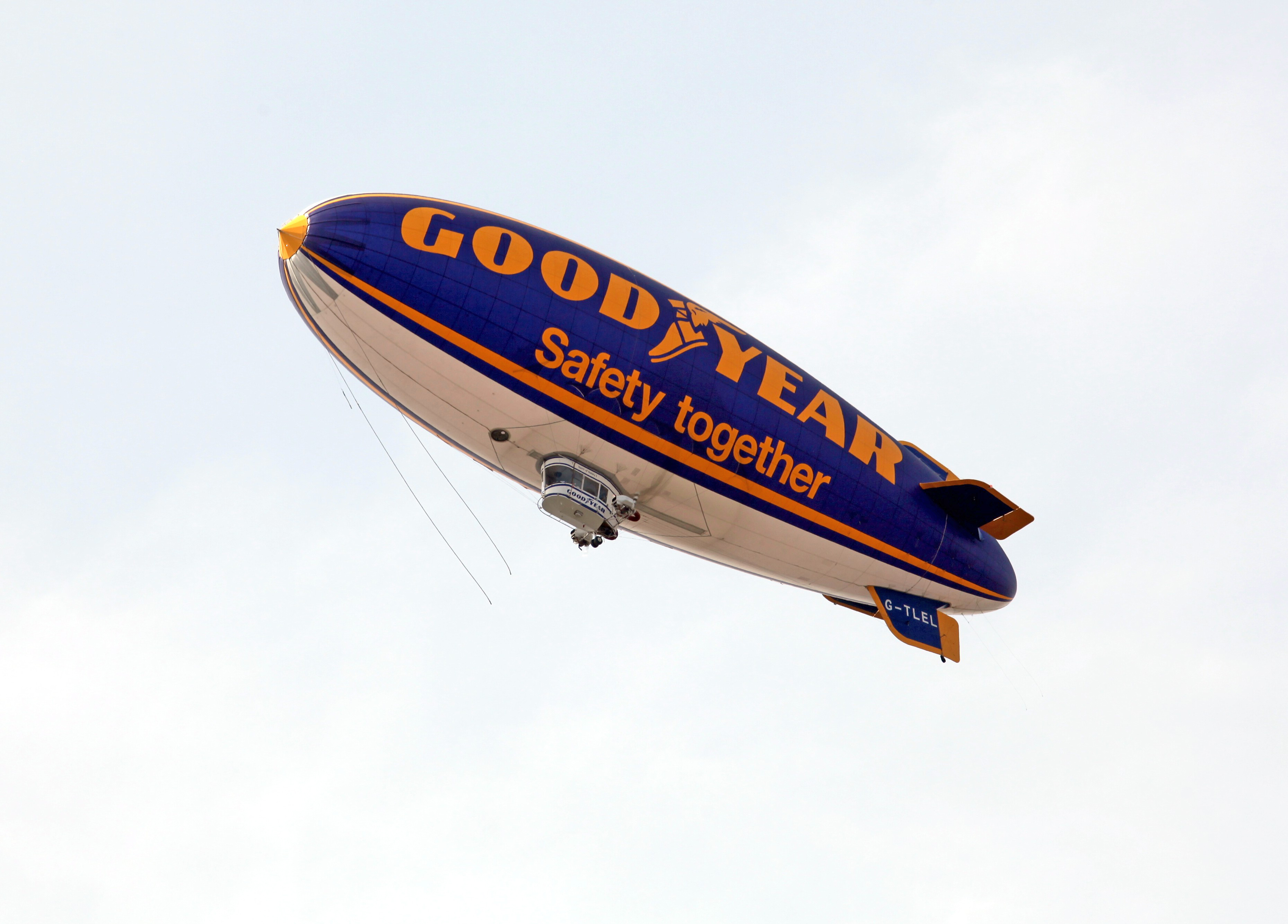
Via a subsidiary, American Blimp Corporation leased Spirit of Safety I to Goodyear in 2011; the blimp crashed in Germany that same year.

- Wingfoot Air Express, while transporting passengers from Chicago's Grant Park to the White City Amusement Park, caught fire then crashed through the skylight of the Illinois Trust & Savings Bank on July 21, 1919, killing one crewman, two passengers, and ten bank employees.
- Columbia, tail number N10A, was buzzed repeatedly by a radio-controlled model airplane when the blimp flew over a field used for R/C model flying on September 3, 1990; the R/C pilot then intentionally rammed his model airplane into the blimp, tearing a three-foot hole through the envelope. The blimp made a "hard landing" at a nearby airport. The R/C pilot, John William Moyer, was identified by other flyers at the field and was arrested.
- Spirit of Akron, tail number N4A, crashed on October 28, 1999, in Suffield, Ohio, when it suddenly entered an uncontrolled left turn and began descending. The pilot and technician on board received only minor injuries when the blimp struck trees. The National Transportation Safety Board report identified that improperly hardened metal splines on the control actuators sheared, causing loss of control. Spirit of Akron was a unique airship, the only Goodyear blimp of the GZ-22 class to be built.
- Stars and Stripes, tail number N1A, crashed on June 16, 2005, in Coral Springs, Florida, when it was caught in a strong thunderstorm that eventually pushed the aircraft into trees and powerlines. There were no injuries in the crash, although the pilot and passenger were trapped for a number of hours until the powerlines could be de-energized. The National Transportation Safety Board accident report claims the cause of the accident to be the pilot's "inadequate in-flight planning/decision which resulted in an in-flight encounter with weather (thunderstorm outflow), and downdrafts..."
- Spirit of Safety I (built by American Blimp Corporation), registered as G-TLEL and owned and operated by Lightship Europe Limited, (but operating in Goodyear livery), caught fire while on landing approach to the Reichelsheim Airport and crashed on June 12, 2011, near Reichelsheim, Hesse, Germany. The pilot, Michael Nerandzic, flew the airship low enough that passengers could jump to the ground, and all three did indeed leap to safety. Nerandzic then, while still able to maintain some control on the burning blimp, climbed away so that fire or wreckage would not hit the escapees; soon after, Nerandzic died in the blimp's fiery wreck.

== In popular culture ==
In 1983, the city of Redondo Beach, California, near the blimp base airport in Carson, California, adopted resolution number 6252 recognizing the Goodyear Airship Columbia (since retired) as the "Official Bird of Redondo Beach".

In Ice Cube's 1993 hit "It Was a Good Day", Cube claims his good day ended with the lights of the Goodyear blimp reading "Ice Cube's a Pimp". In 2014 Goodyear flew the blimp in celebration of Ice Cube, with the message “Today Is A Good Day”, helping to raise $25,000 for a local charity. In 2025, Goodyear sponsored Ice Cube's newest tour and promised to fly the blimp over select venues during the tour while displaying the words "Ice Cube's a Pimp".

Green Day's 1994 album Dookie features a reference to the blimp in the form of a 'Bad Year' Blimp in the top left corner of the official album cover.

On a 2001 episode of That 70's Show, Leo (Tommy Chong) recalls seeing what he thought was a UFO at a football game, which displayed a message that he interpreted as a prediction of a "good year."

In January 2019, the College Football Hall of Fame inducted the Goodyear Blimp as its first-ever nonhuman inductee.

The Aldrich Blimp in Thomas Harris's 1975 novel Black Sunday is based on the Goodyear Blimp flying over the Super Bowl. It is the intended target of a terror plot. Goodyear allowed the use of the blimp in the 1977 film adaptation, but set stipulations to protect its reputation.
