= Airship do Brasil =

Company that is the only manufacturer of blimps in Latin America

- Company type: Private
- Industry: Aerospace
- Founded: 2005; 21 years ago
- Headquarters: São Carlos, São Paulo, 22°00′07″S 47°52′04″W
- Key people: Marcelo Felippes
- Products: Blimps

Airship do Brasil, commonly shortened to ADB, was a Brazilian privately owned São Paulo-based company that is the only manufacturer of blimps in the Latin America. It manufactures the hardware and rigging for the Lightship and Spector brands of airships. In 2018, Airship do Brasil and Buoyant Aircraft Systems International, a Canadian airships manufacturer, signed a partnership agreement to expand the industry.

== Models ==
ADB was founded in 2005 by the former Brazilian Army officer Marcelo Felippes. The company's lightships (proprietary blimps) are the ADB-1 and ADB-2, as well as the ADB-3-3, The company has also developed captive surveillance balloons.

In 2009, it launched the ADB-1 and ADB-2 series, radio-controlled unmanned airships.

In 2017, it launched the largest airship ever produced by the company, and also the largest ever made in Latin America, the ADB-3-X01. In december 2020, the model is going through the National Civil Aviation Agency of Brazil certification process.

In 2024, ceased its operations due lack of investiments.

== São Paulo Facilities ==
The location has a 20,000-square-metre (220,000 sq ft) facility at São Carlos.

== See also ==
- Santa Cruz Air Force Base
- Bartolomeu de Gusmão
