= Albree Pigeon-Fraser =

American fighter prototype

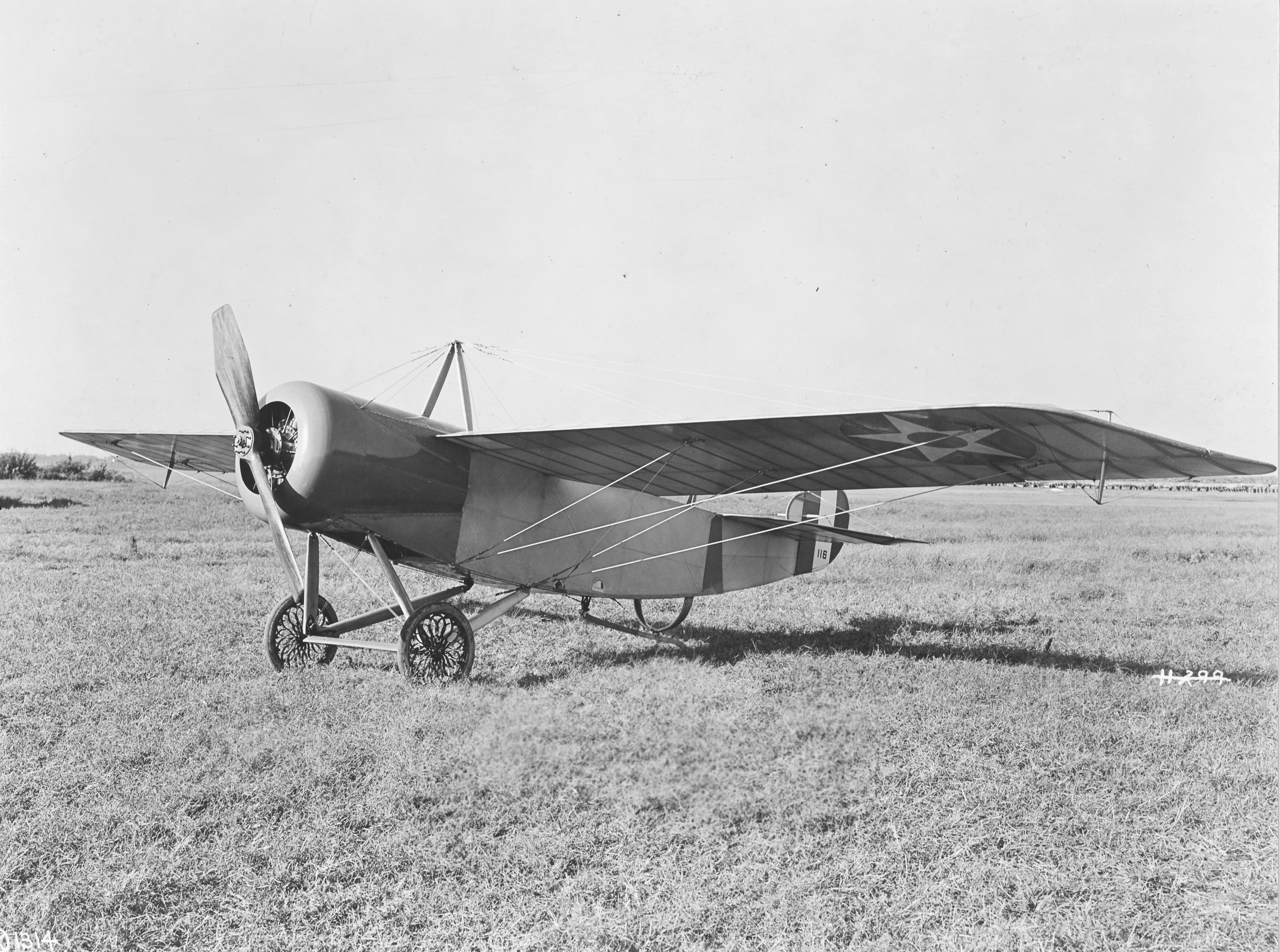

General information
- Type: Fighter
- National origin: United States
- Designer: George N. Albree
- Status: cancelled
- Number built: 3

History
- First flight: December 1917

The Albree Pigeon-Fraser was the first pursuit aircraft project for the United States Government.

== Development ==
George Albree was awarded the first US pursuit aircraft contract in 1917. The aircraft was designed with a flat bottom airfoil and the aft fuselage was hinged to act like an elevator.

== Operational history ==
The first aircraft flew in December 1917, however it crashed on its first flight, killing the pilot. The second aircraft never flew and was destroyed during structural testing. The third aircraft was not completed before the program was cancelled for being "too old-fashioned, unreliable, and slow".

== Surviving aircraft ==
The incomplete third aircraft was put into storage and in 1961 was acquired by the Old Rhinebeck Aerodrome where it is currently on display.

== Specifications ==
Data from The Complete Book of Fighters

General characteristics

- Crew: 1
- Length: 24 ft 0 in (7.32 m)
- Wingspan: 37 ft 11 in (11.56 m)
- Gross weight: 1,250 lb (567 kg)
- Powerplant: 1 × Gnome rotary engine, 100 hp (75 kW)

Performance

- Maximum speed: 103 mph (166 km/h, 90 kn)
