= Reichelsheim Airfield =

Reichelsheim Airfield Flugplatz Reichelsheim
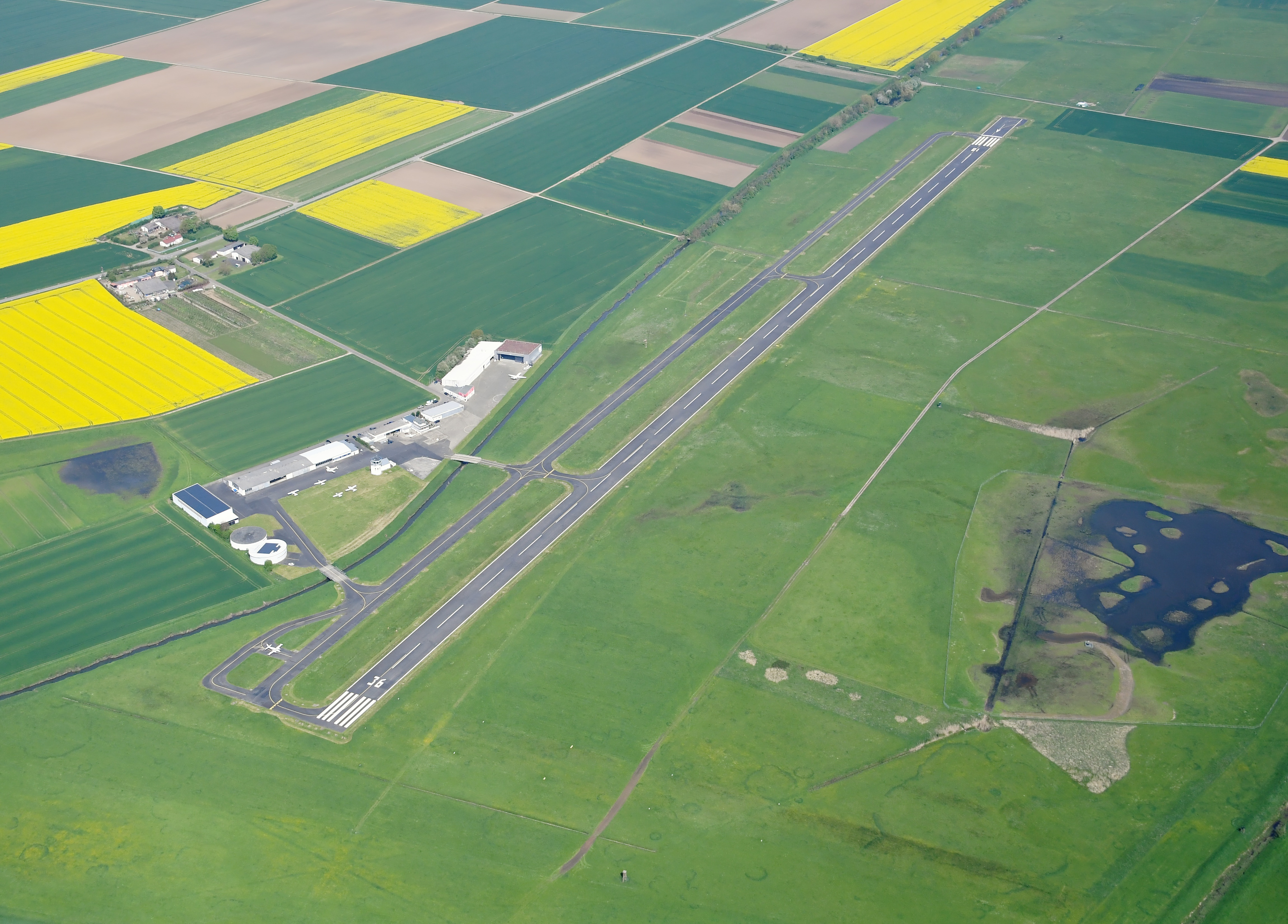
- IATA: none; ICAO: EDFB

Summary
- Airport type: Public
- Operator: Flugplatz Reichelsheim-Wetterau GmbH+Co KG
- Location: Reichelsheim (Wetterau)
- Elevation AMSL: 398 ft / 121 m
- Coordinates: 50°20′9″N 8°52′51″E
- Interactive map of Reichelsheim Airfield

Runways
Direction	Length		Surface
Direction	m	ft	Surface
18/36	1,300	4,265	Asphalt
09/27	250	820	Grass

Reichelsheim Airfield is a general aviation aerodrome in the German state of Hesse, 25 kilometres (16 mi) north of Frankfurt am Main.

== Facilities ==
The airfield resides at an elevation of 398 feet (121 m) above mean sea level. It has an asphalt paved runway designated 18/36 which measures 1,300 by 23 metres (4,265 ft × 75 ft). It offers runway - and taxiway illumination, PAPI, REIL and ALS. Aircraft up to 8,000 kg (17,636 lb) are allowed to operate.

The aerodrome also serves as an important heliport for medevac and VIP transports. Johanniter-Unfall-Hilfe e. V. is present with its 24h/365days medevac helicopters Christoph Hessen and Christoph Rhein-Main.

== Airlines and destinations ==
There are no scheduled services to and from Reichelsheim Airfield.
