= Aeronautics Defense Skystar 300 =

Skystar 300

General information
- Type: Surveillance blimp
- National origin: Israel
- Manufacturer: Aeronautics Defense Systems

The Skystar 300 is a surveillance blimp. It is an ISR system that provides surveillance capabilities accomplished by simple equipment, which requires minimal operating skills and maintenance procedures. The system is composed of the Aerostat Balloon, filled with helium gas, dual sensor payload, control unit and the data link between the control unit and the balloon.

== Operators ==
- Israel
- Mexico - The Mexican government signed a $22 million deal with Israeli company Aeronautics Defense Systems, Ltd. The contract will supply an unmanned spy plane and surveillance blimp to the Mexican Federal Police.
