= DirecTV blimp =

Airship owned by streaming company DirecTV

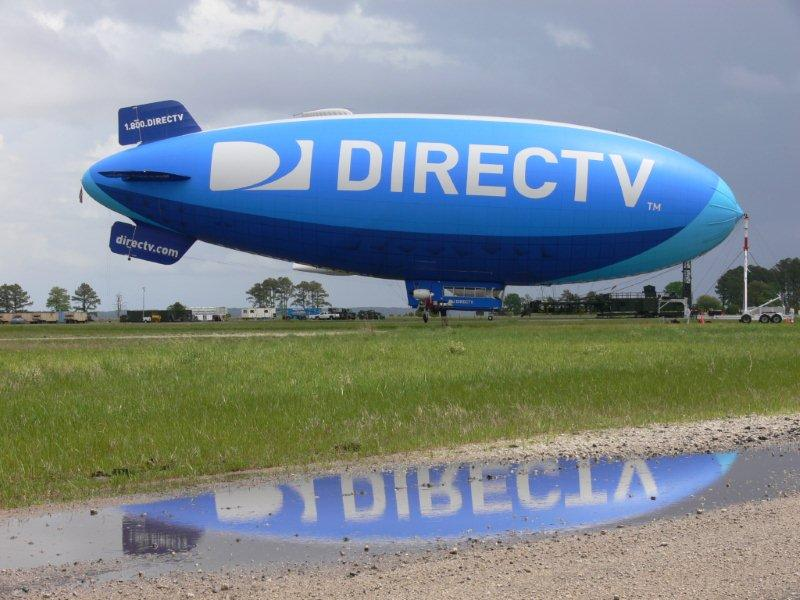
DirecTV Blimp in North Carolina, 2011

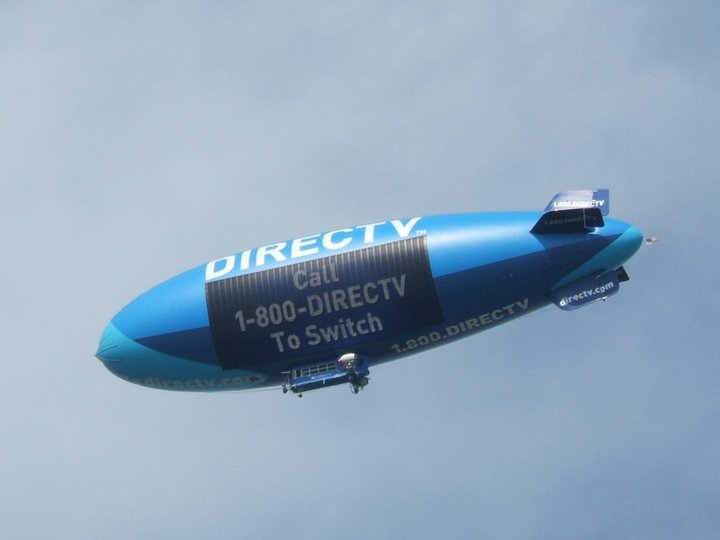
DirecTV Blimp over New York City, 2011

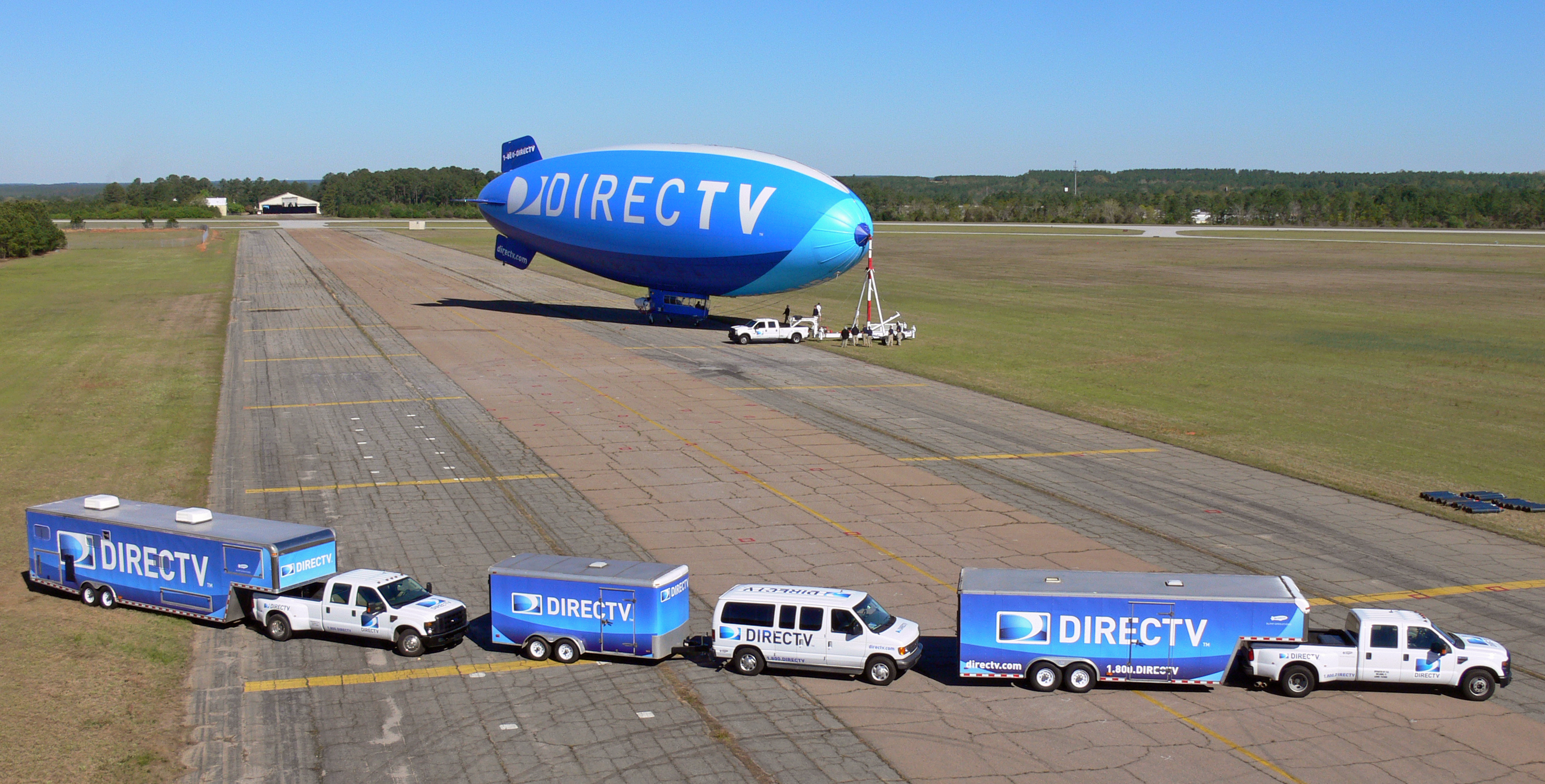
DirecTV Blimp and ground operation in North Carolina, 2011

The DirecTV blimp was a blimp that was launched in October 2007 at the MLB World Series in Boston and had been seen all over the United States up until 2017. The blimp would fly mainly over live sporting events but had also been seen at other entertainment and charitable venues. This lightsign, the only one of its kind in the world, was used to display messaging and advertising for DIRECTV. The airship was owned and operated by an advertising company based in Florida with its airship division located in Orlando, FL. The DIRECTV blimp was one of the three airships that took part in a blimp race held over New York City on July 4, 2011.

== About the airship ==
Manufactured mostly by American Blimp Corporation, the airship has a length of 178 ft (54 m) and a width of 46 ft (14 m) with a volume of 170,000 cubic feet (4,800 m^{3}) of helium.

The airship’s envelope and ballonet were designed and manufactured by ILC Dover, a manufacturer of flexible materials and softgoods based out of Frederick, Delaware. The length of the cabin or gondola is 11.4 ft (3.5 m) with a width of 5 ft (1.5 m). The airship is also designed to carry a maximum of 8 passengers plus the pilot. The desired cruising speed can vary, but it is generally around 32 mph (51 km/h) with a maximum speed of 48 mph (77 km/h) when favorable winds are present. The engines of this airship are from manufacturer Lycoming Engines with twin Lycoming IO 360, rated 180 HP with constant speed variable pitch reversible propellers. The airship also needs a crew of at least 14 members which includes 2 pilots, 2 crew chiefs, mechanics, video lightsign operator and additional ground team.

== Camera ==
The high-definition camera is gyroscopically stabilized and mounted to the front of the airship when it is providing the aerial shots for the network television. The camera is linked to a control panel that is controlled by a camera operator who sits in the cockpit behind the pilot's chair. During each event, the camera operator and pilot work together with the show director to provide the requested shot. The camera lens can magnify what is on the ground 72 times. Camera services for the airship are provided by Flying Pictures, an aerial video company based in the United Kingdom. The signal form the camera is transmitted via microwave downlink, which is received on site by a microwave technician with a receiving antenna array. This receiving antenna array is hard-wired into the network's production facilities, which then use the aerial camera just as they would use any other camera.

== Video screen ==
With 33,600 pixels and 235,200 LEDs, the screen can be seen day or night giving the people on the ground the opportunity to see the sponsor's advertisements. At 70 ft (21 m) by 30 ft (9.1 m) the full color video sign is capable of displaying full motion and color TV quality video. The LED screen also has the capability of displaying live video action, concerts, highlights, scoreboards and interviews. The video screen has been part of marriage proposals, birthday announcements and network commentators play by play action calling.
