= Conan blimp =

Airship

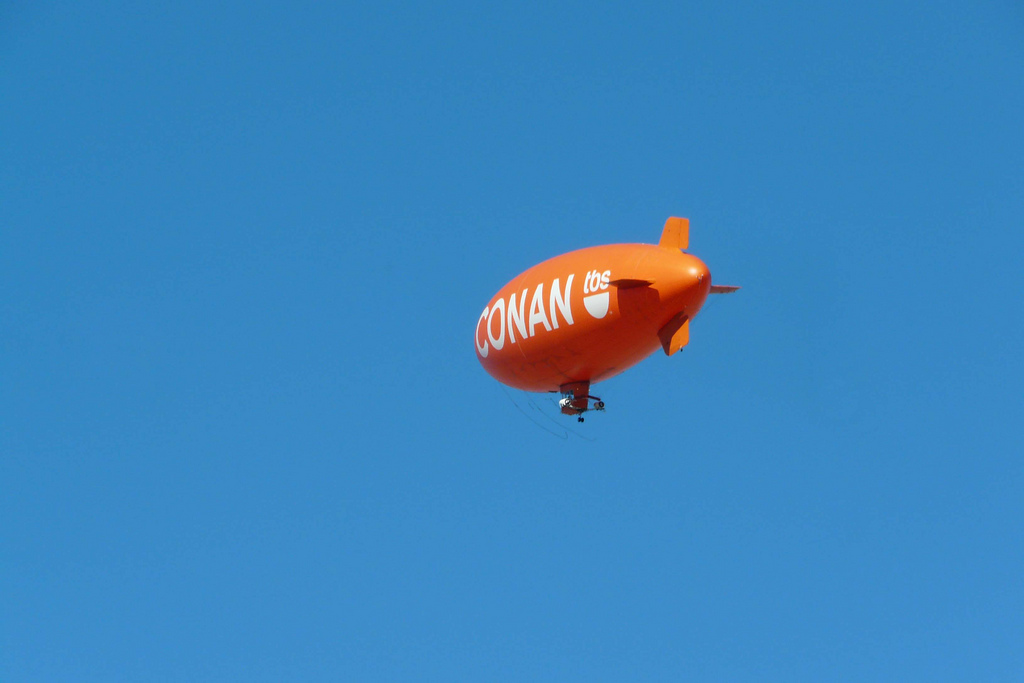
The Conan blimp

The Conan blimp was an orange dirigible owned by Turner Broadcasting System for the purpose of promoting the premiere of Conan O'Brien on his late-night talk show, Conan, on TBS.

== Background ==
O'Brien's shift from NBC to TBS stemmed from the 2010 Tonight Show conflict between O'Brien and former Tonight Show host Jay Leno. The controversy occurred when, due to the low ratings of The Jay Leno Show and The Tonight Show with Conan O'Brien, NBC announced that Leno would be moved from 10:00 p.m. to 11:35 p.m. and O'Brien would be moved from 11:30 p.m. to 12:05 a.m. The announcement occurred seven months after The Tonight Show with Conan O'Brien's premiere, and over four years after it was made known that O'Brien would replace Leno as the Tonight Show host. Ultimately, NBC Universal chief Jeff Zucker's decision to reschedule O'Brien and Leno's time slots led to O'Brien's departure from the network and a public outcry from O'Brien's fans on social media sites like Twitter and Facebook.

During the controversy, O'Brien's online supporters started the "Team Conan" or "Team Coco" movement, employing phrases such as "I'm With Coco" to show their support for the late-night talk show host. In February 2010, one month after his departure from NBC, O'Brien joined Twitter and acquired 300,000 followers in 24 hours.

Many of O'Brien's followers, both fans and celebrities, remained faithful to the "Team Conan" movement throughout his short, contractually-obligated absence from television. As he embarked on The Legally Prohibited from Being Funny on Television Tour and prepared to host Conan on TBS, O'Brien's social media presence became a powerful marketing tool. Prior to announcing the start of Conan, he used Twitter to promote and sell "The Prohibited Tour." The tour's success even led to Conan O'Brien Can't Stop, O'Brien's self-marketed documentary.

O'Brien used "The Legally Prohibited from Being Funny on Television Tour" and his social media presence to announce the start of Conan. Being a smaller network than NBC, TBS' goal was to bring as much of O'Brien's united fan base over to their late-night programs as possible. Thus, to promote the never-before-seen late-night talk show as effectively as he did his tour and documentary, O'Brien and TBS developed the Conan blimp. The orange airship, bearing "CONAN" across its side, was designed to engage fans with its social media functions and allow them to get a better feel for the new TBS program's vibe. This included an interactive blimp website with a live map and a livecam to track the blimp, promotional television and YouTube commercials, a Flickr image collection and the #TheConanBlimp hashtag on Twitter. O'Brien also developed his own mobile app to share pictures and videos of the Conan cast, crew and blimp.

Arguably the most effective social media trend that O'Brien's team took advantage of at that time was Foursquare. In 2010, mobile advertising was quickly becoming the most prominent form of marketing, with Foursquare's social, interactive function at the forefront. O'Brien connected with Foursquare users by allowing them to check into the blimp. Afterwards, users would receive a "Conan Blimpspotter" badge and a message saying, "You've spotted the Conan Blimp! A big orange bag of slow moving gas has never looked so pretty.

The blimp's Foursquare application earned 21,000 check-ins and over a hundred comments. During that time, "Team Coco" was also followed by more than 51,000 Foursquare users. The blimp was subsequently nominated for the Location of the Year Shorty Award.

== Creation and sponsors ==
The blimp was an American Blimp Corporation type A60+, originally built in 2002 to promote the Rolling Stones' 2002 World Tour. Today, the blimp is owned by Van Wagner Airship Group, a branch of Van Wagner Communications LLC. Van Wagner purchased the American Blimp Corporation in September 2012. The blimp is registered as N620LG cn 020. The Conan blimp itself was designed by the Atlanta firm Blue Sky.

Prior to Blue Sky handling, the physical production of the dirigible, Breakfast, a digital-interactive agency based in New York, developed a small model blimp with video capabilities and an iPad control system. Created for MunNY Exhibit's 2010 Design Week, this design served as the first prototype of the Conan blimp. Breakfast used their model to contribute web design and social media functions to Blue Sky's creation.

At the time of the blimp's creation, the promotion of Conan relied heavily on sponsors like AT&T, who funded its advertisements despite the fact that TBS had not yet aired a single episode. AT&T served as Conan's biggest sponsor, funding the blimp's interactive website, promotional commercials and appearances at the MLB postseason games.

== Appearances ==
The blimp debuted several weeks before the premiere of Conan to provide aerial footage for 2010 Major League Baseball postseason games airing on TBS.

Over time, however, the blimp transformed into an iconic comedic symbol of Conan. As opposed to being simply used for promotional purposes, the blimp was incorporated into several of the late-night show's comedic sketches. Typically, the expensive blimp was used for ironically trivial purposes, such as providing aerial coverage of a bike race among Conan's crew. It usually appears along with dramatic music after O'Brien says, "As you know, I am the only television personality...who has...his own blimp."

One of the more popular recurring Conan gags involves the blimp following actor Gary Busey around Los Angeles, much to Busey's annoyance.

Team Coco announced the blimp was being retired on December 1, 2010. At the time, O'Brien planned to have the blimp donated to the Smithsonian Institution.

The blimp then returned to the skies for the 2011 National League Championship Series. It also returned for the Conan shows recorded from New York, NY from October 31 to November 3, 2011. The blimp arrived early to advertise the show and flew over New York City during the week of shows. Users of the application Foursquare were again invited check-in to the blimp to receive a special real cloth badge commemorating the week of shows and the blimp.
