= Blimp =

Non-rigid airship

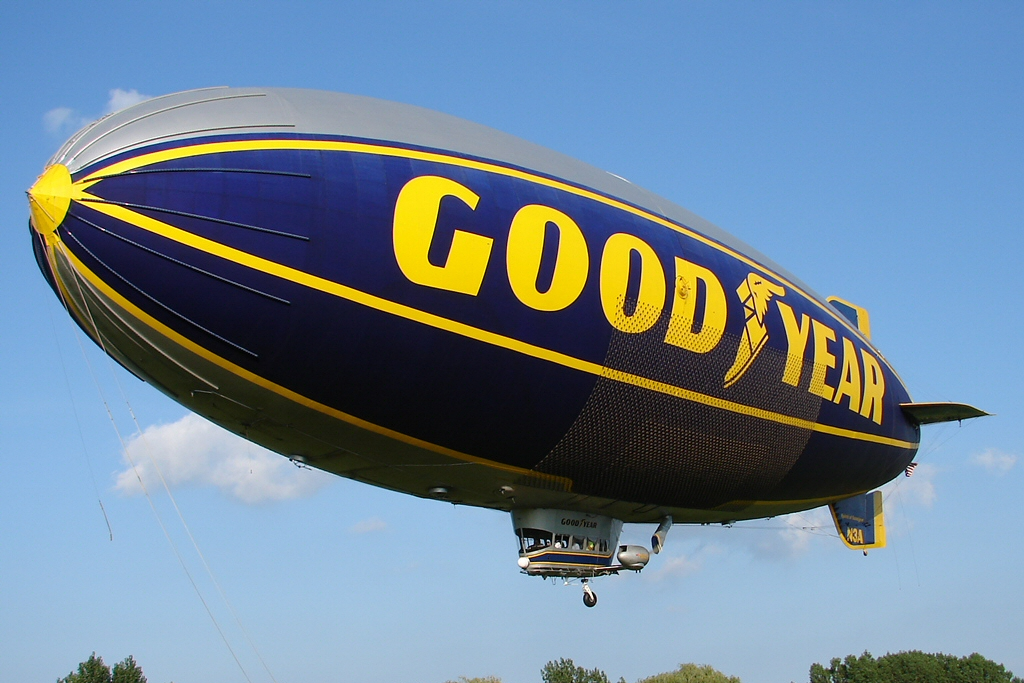
The Spirit of Goodyear, one of the iconic Goodyear Blimps

A blimp (/blɪmp/), less commonly called a non-rigid airship, is an airship (dirigible) without an internal structural framework or a keel. Unlike semi-rigid and rigid airships (e.g. Zeppelins), blimps rely on the pressure of their lifting gas (usually helium, rather than flammable hydrogen) and the strength of the envelope to maintain their shape. Blimps are known for their use in advertising, surveillance, and observation due to their maneuverability, slow speeds and steady flight capabilities.

== Principle ==
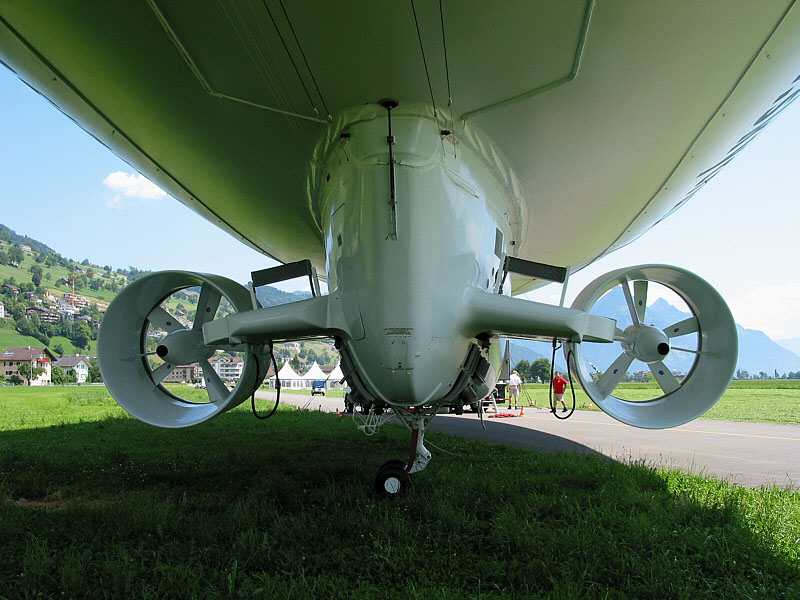
Steerable ducted fans on a Skyship 600 provide thrust, limited direction control, and also serve to inflate the ballonets to maintain the necessary overpressure.

Since blimps keep their shape with internal overpressure, typically the only solid parts are the passenger car (gondola) and the tail fins. A non-rigid airship that uses heated air instead of a light gas (such as helium) as a lifting medium is called a hot-air airship (sometimes there are battens near the bow, which assist with higher forces there from a mooring attachment or from the greater aerodynamic pressures there).

Volume changes of the lifting gas due to temperature changes or to changes of altitude are compensated for by pumping air into internal ballonets (air bags) to maintain the overpressure. Without sufficient overpressure, the blimp loses its ability to be steered and is slowed due to increased drag and distortion. The propeller air stream can be used to inflate the ballonets and so the hull. In some models, such as the Skyship 600, differential ballonet inflation can provide a measure of pitch trim control.

The engines driving the propellers are usually directly attached to the gondola, and in some models are partly steerable.

Blimps are the most commonly built airships because they are relatively easy to build and easy to transport once deflated. However, because of their unstable hull, their size is limited. A blimp with too long a hull may kink in the middle when the overpressure is insufficient or when maneuvered too fast (this has also happened with semi-rigid airships with weak keels). This led to the development of semi-rigids and rigid airships.

Modern blimps are launched somewhat heavier than air (overweight), in contrast to historic blimps. The missing lift is provided by lifting the nose and using engine power, or by angling the engine thrust. Some types also use steerable propellers or ducted fans. Operating in a state heavier than air avoids the need to dump ballast at lift-off and also avoids the need to lose costly helium lifting gas on landing (most of the Zeppelins achieved lift with very inexpensive hydrogen, which could be vented without concern to decrease altitude).

== Etymology ==
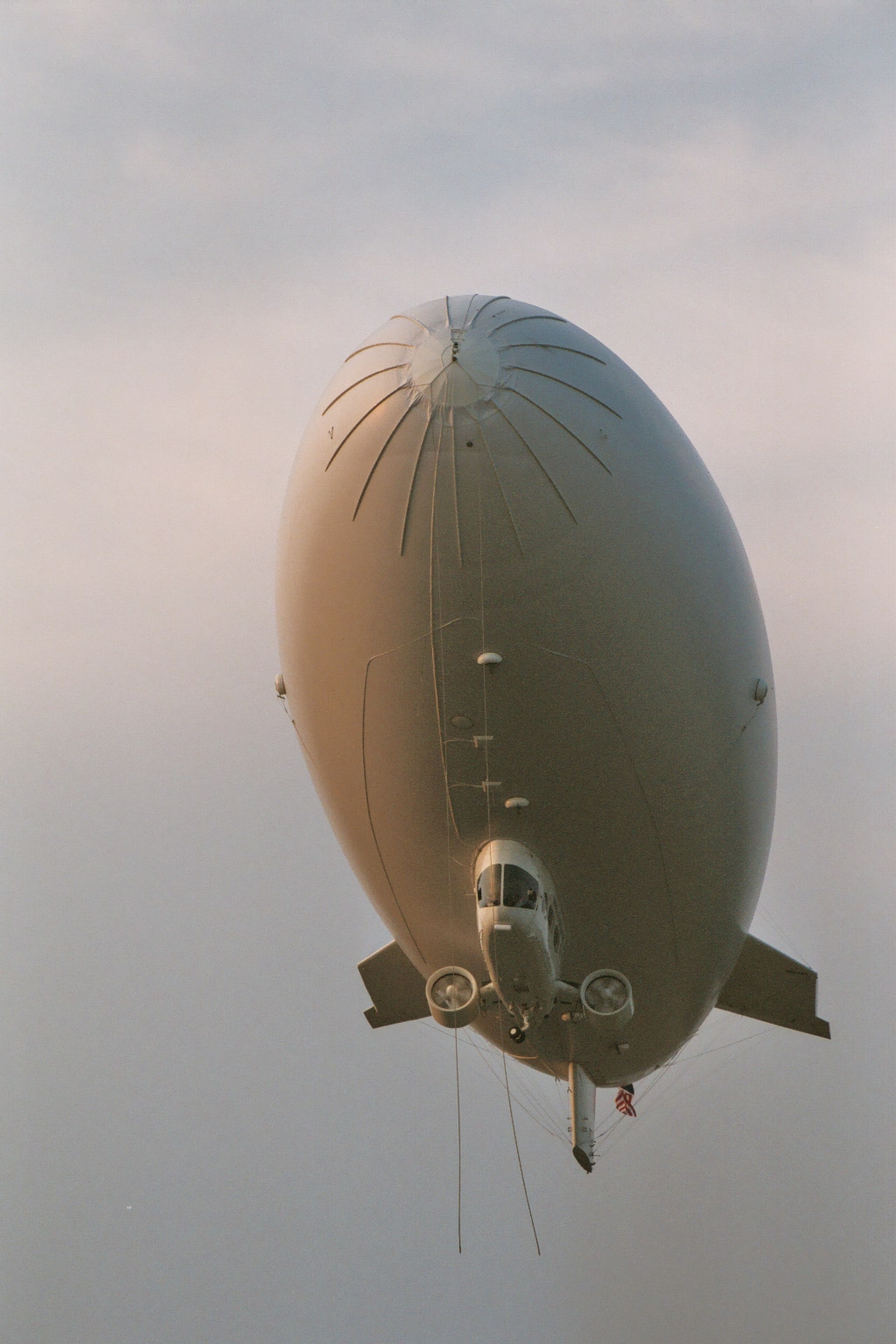
A modern blimp from Airship Management Services showing a strengthened nose, ducted fans attached to the gondola under the hull, and cable-braced fins at the tail

The origin of the word "blimp" has been the subject of some confusion. Lennart Ege notes two possible derivations:

Colloquially, non-rigid airships always were referred to as "blimps". Over the years, several explanations have been advanced about the origin of this word. The most common is that in the military vernacular, the Type B was referred to as "limp bag", which was simply abbreviated to "blimp". An alternative explanation is that on 5 December 1915, Commander A. D. Cunningham, R.N., of the Capel-Le-Ferne Air Ship Station, flicked the envelope of the airship SS.12 with his fingers during an inspection, which produced a sound that he mimicked and pronounced as "blimp", and that the word then caught on as the nickname for all small non-rigid airships.

A 1943 etymology, published in The New York Times, supports a British origin during the First World War when the British were experimenting with lighter-than-air craft. The initial non-rigid aircraft was called the A-limp; and a second version called the B-limp was deemed more satisfactory.

Yet a third derivation is given by Barnes and James in Shorts Aircraft since 1900:

In February 1915 the need for anti-submarine patrol airships became urgent, and the Submarine Scout type was quickly improvised by hanging an obsolete B.E.2c fuselage from a spare Willows envelope; this was done by the R.N.A.S. at Kingsnorth, and on seeing the result for the first time, Horace Short, already noted for his very apt and original vocabulary, named it "Blimp", adding, "What else would you call it?"

Dr. A. D. Topping researched the origins of the word and concluded that the British had never had a "Type B, limp" designation, and that Cunningham's coinage appeared to be the correct explanation.

The Oxford English Dictionary notes its use in print in 1916: "Visited the Blimps ... this afternoon at Capel". In 1918, the Illustrated London News said that it was "an onomatopœic name invented by that genius for apposite nomenclature, the late Horace Short".

Blimp flying in Japan

== Use ==
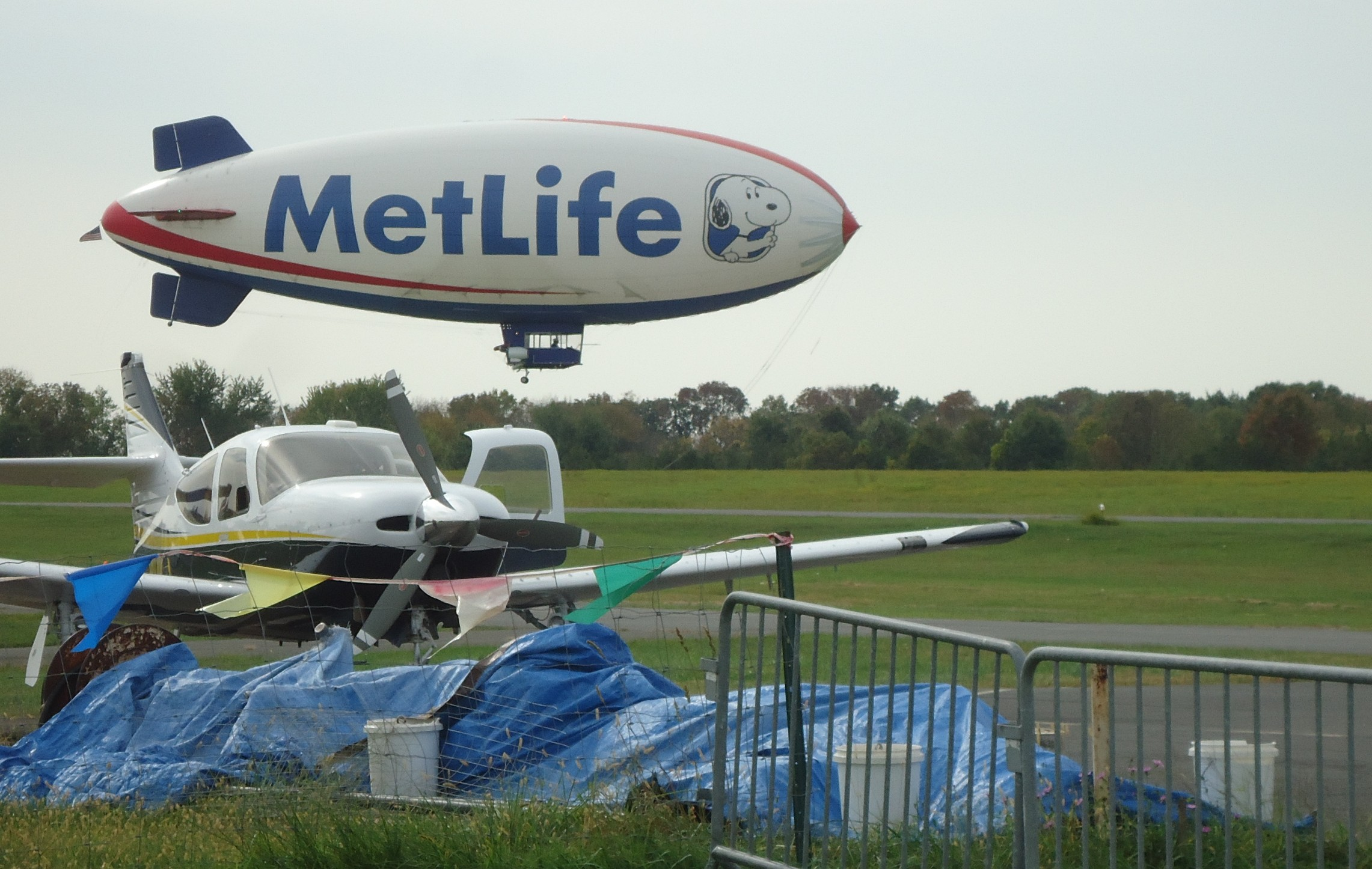
Advertising blimp landing at local airport in New Jersey

The B-class blimps were patrol airships operated by the United States Navy during and shortly after World War I. The Navy learned a great deal from the DN-1 fiasco. The result was the very successful B-type airships. Dr. Jerome Hunsaker was asked to develop a theory of airship design. This was followed by then-Lieutenant John H. Towers, USN, returning from Europe having inspected British designs, and the U.S. Navy subsequently sought bids for 16 blimps from American manufacturers. On 4 February 1917 the Secretary of the Navy directed that 16 nonrigid airships of Class B be procured. Ultimately Goodyear built 9 envelopes, Goodrich built five and Curtiss built the gondolas for all of those 14 ships. Connecticut Aircraft contracted with U.S. Rubber for its two envelopes and with Pigeon Fraser for its gondolas. The Curtiss-built gondolas were modified JN-4 fuselages and were powered by OX-5 engines. The Connecticut Aircraft blimps were powered by Hall-Scott engines.

In 1930, a former German airship officer, Captain Anton Heinen, working in the US for the US Navy on its dirigible fleet, attempted to design and build a four-place blimp called the "family air yacht" for private fliers which the inventor claimed would be priced below $10,000 and easier to fly than a fixed-wing aircraft if placed in production. It was unsuccessful.

In 2021, Reader's Digest said that "consensus is that there are about 25 blimps still in existence and only about half of them are still in use for advertising purposes". The Airsign Airship Group is the owner and operator of 8 of these active ships, including the Hood Blimp, DirecTV blimp, and the MetLife blimp.

=== Surveillance blimp ===
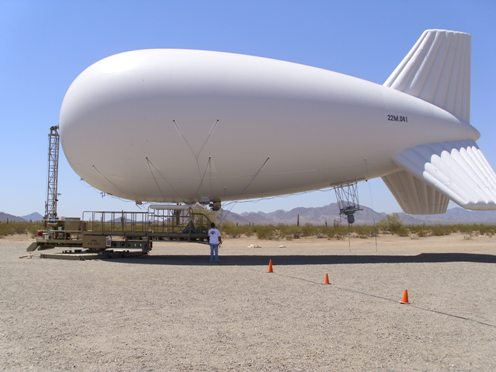
A TCOM 22M Aerostat and Trailer

This blimp is a type of airborne early warning and control aircraft, typically as the active part of a system which includes a mooring platform, communications and information processing. Example systems include the U.S. JLENS and Israeli Aeronautics Defense Skystar 300.

Surveillance blimps known as aerostats have been used extensively in the Middle East by the United States military, the United Arab Emirates and Kuwait.

== Examples of non-rigid airships ==
Manufacturers in many countries have built blimps in many designs. Some examples include:

- ADB-3-X01, the largest lightship ever manufactured by Airship do Brasil, the only blimp manufacturing company in Latin America
- AVIC AS700 Airship
- Astra-Torres airship, non-rigid airships manufactured by Société Astra and used in World War I by France and UK
- British Army airship Beta
- Coastal class airship, C* class airship UK coastal blimps used in WW I
- SS, SSP, SST, SSZ and NS class airships, convoy escort blimps used by the UK in WW I
- G class blimp and L class blimp, US training blimps built by Goodyear during World War II
- K class blimp and M class blimp, US anti-submarine blimps operated during World War II
- Mantainer Ardath, an Australian blimp, in use during the mid-1970s
- N class blimp (the "Nan ship"), used for anti-submarine and as a radar early-warning platform during the 1950s
- Goodyear Blimps, a fleet of blimps operated for advertising purposes and as a television camera platform (transitioned to semi-rigid starting in 2014)
- Skyship 600, a private blimp used by advertising companies
- P-791, an experimental aerostatic/aerodynamic hybrid airship developed by Lockheed-Martin corporation
- SVAM CA-80, an airship manufactured by the Shanghai Vantage Airship Manufacture Co in China
- TC-3 and TC-7, two US Army Corps non-rigid blimps used for parasite fighter trials during 1923–24
- UConn Lumpy, an airship built and flown in 1975 by students at the University of Connecticut
- WDL 2, airship for aerial advertising manufactured and used by WDL Group, Germany
- Willows airships
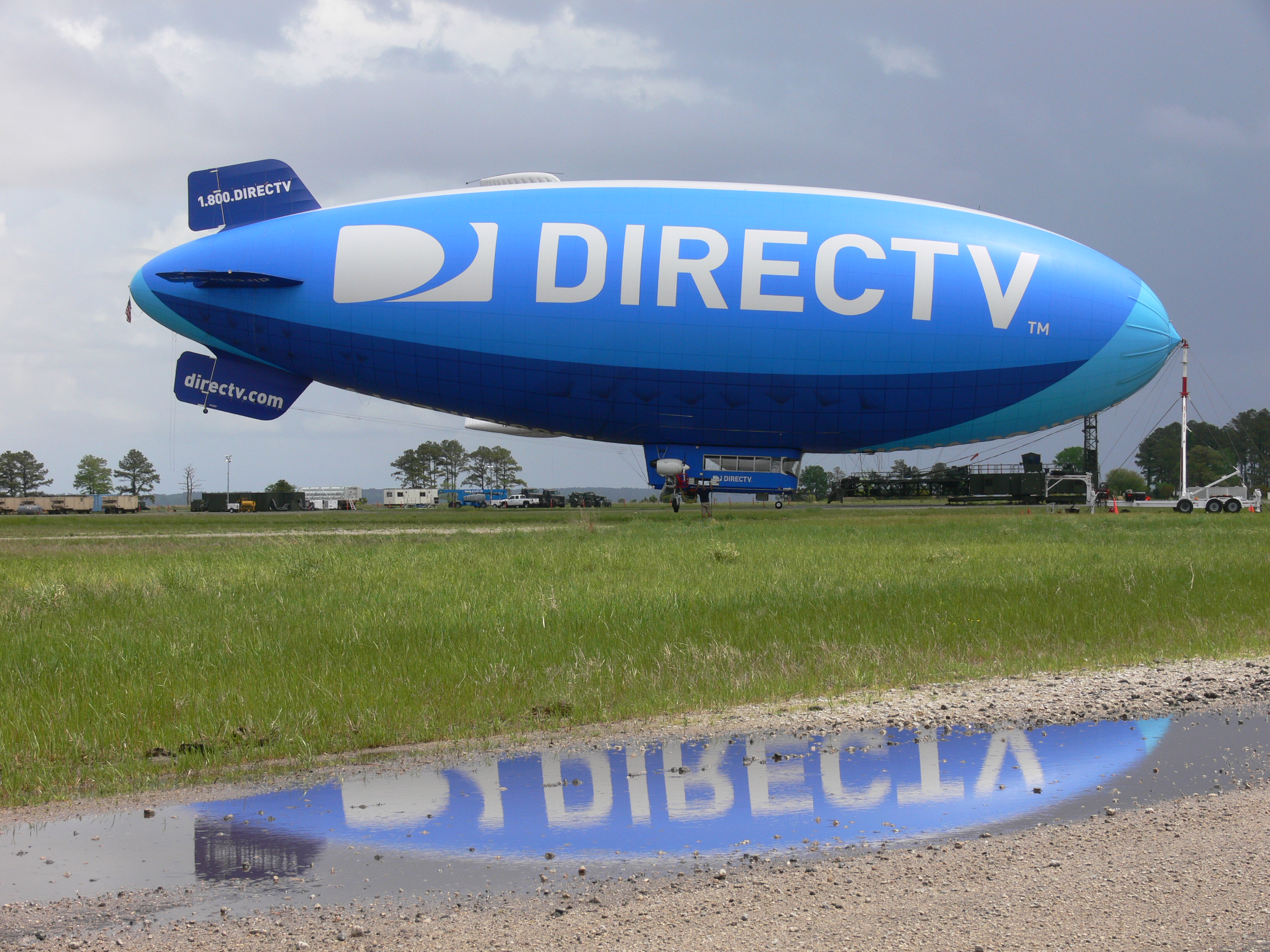
DIRECTV blimp Airship, Model A-170LS Video Lightsign

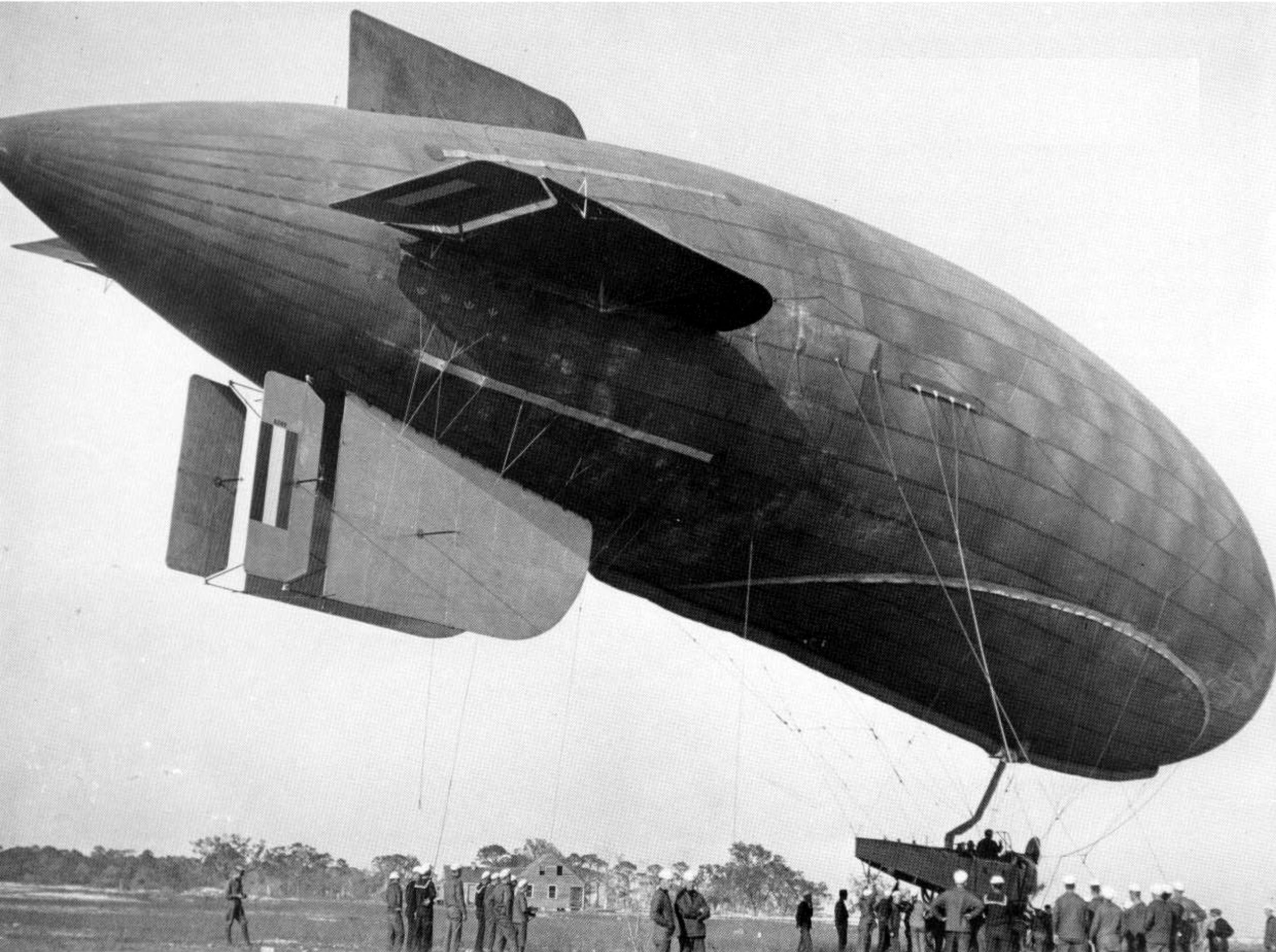

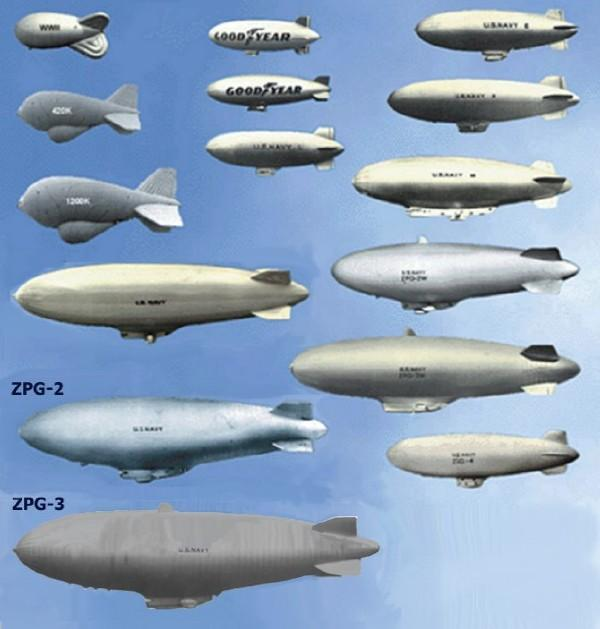

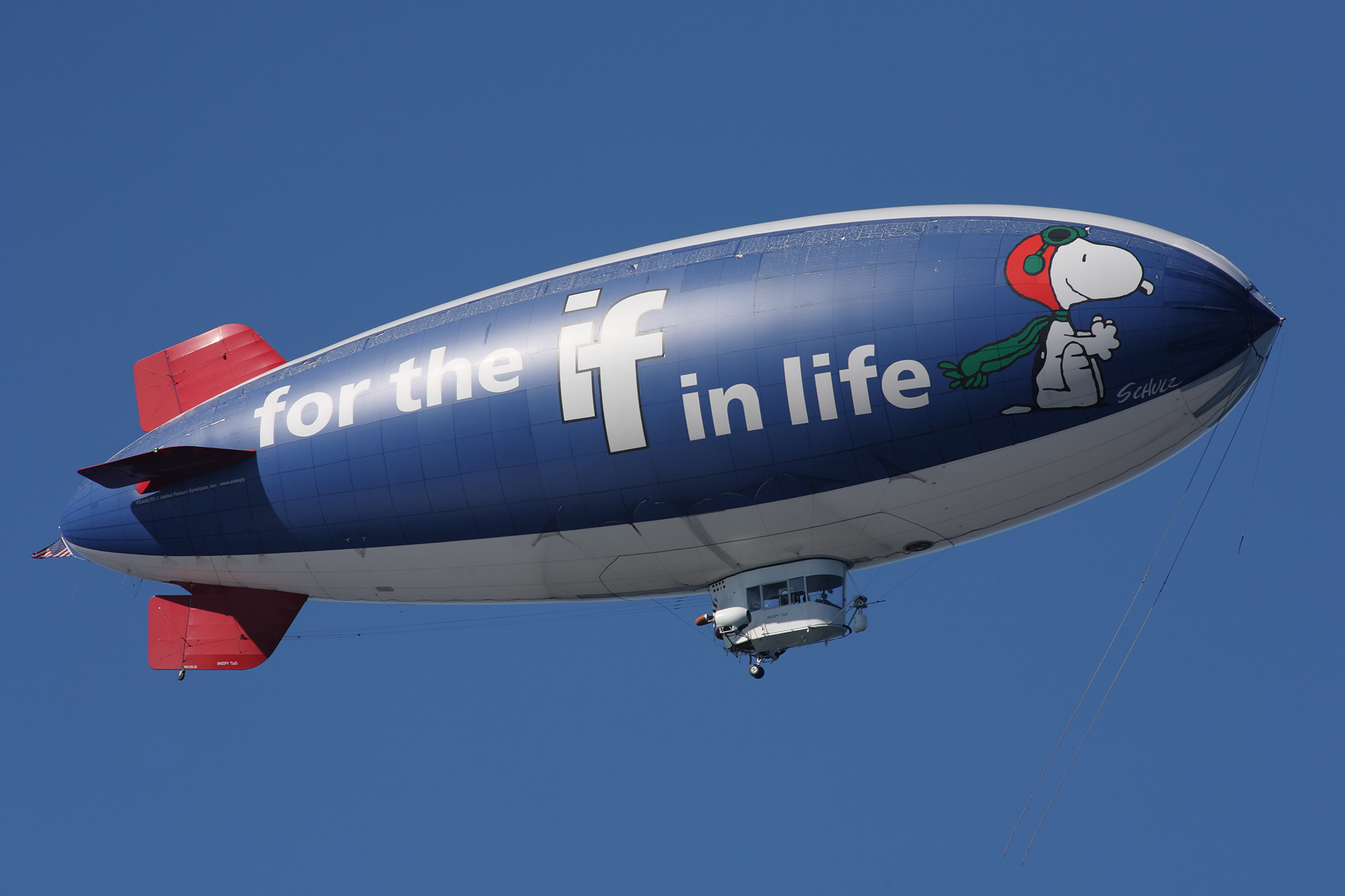
An A-60+, the MetLife Snoopy Two

== See also ==
- Airship hangar
- List of current airships in the United States
- Mooring mast
- Solar aircraft
- Thermal airship, a type of blimp using hot air for lift
