= Leonardo Torres Quevedo =

Spanish civil engineer (1852–1936)

The Most Excellent Leonardo Torres Quevedo
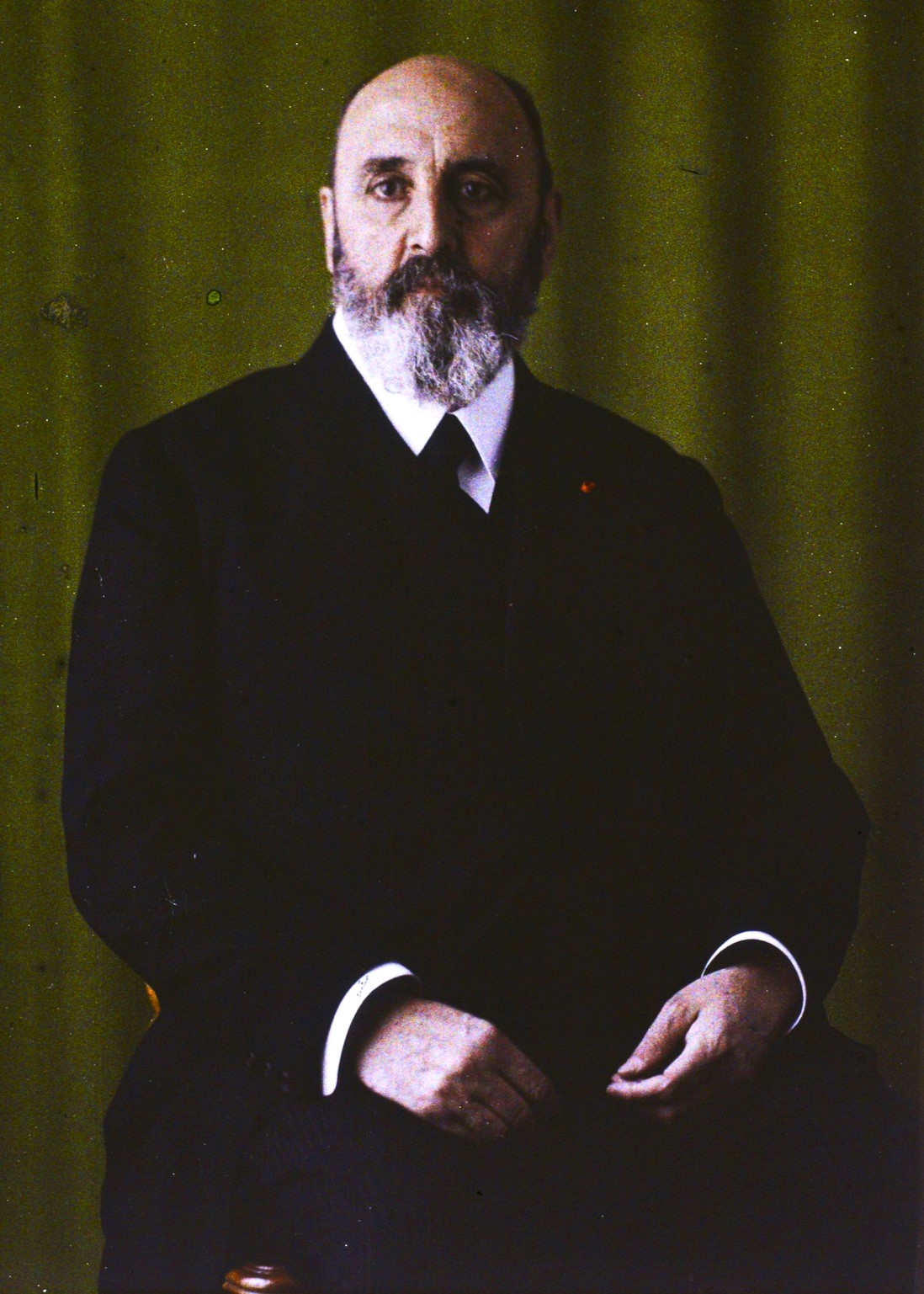
- Autochrome by Auguste Léon, 1921
- Born: 28 December 1852; Molledo, Spain
- Died: 18 December 1936 (aged 83); Madrid, Spain
- Burial place: Saint Isidore Cemetery
- Education: School of Civil Engineering (Technical University of Madrid)
- Occupations: Inventor; mathematician; engineer; Esperantist
- Known for: See list: El Ajedrecista Telekino (Remote control) Electromechanical Arithmometer (Analytical machine) Astra-Torres airship Mooring mast Whirlpool Aero Car Mount Ulia aerial ropeway Binave (Catamaran) Camp-Vessel (Balloon carrier) Coordinate Indicator "Guide Torres" Dianemologo Deformable Fusiform Balloons Interlocks T.Q. Projectable Pointer Didactic Projector Analog computing Logarithmic number system Formal language Floating-point arithmetic Exponentiation Laboratory of Automatics Centre for Aeronautical Research
- Spouse: Luz Polanco y Navarro (m. 1885)
- Children: 8, including Gonzalo Torres Polanco
- Awards: See list: Civil Order of Alfonso XII (1906) Echegaray Medal (1916) Parville Prize (1916) Order of Charles III (1921) Legion of Honour (1921) Military Order of Saint James of the Sword (1922) Honorary doctorates: University of Paris (1923), University of Coimbra (1925) Order of the Spanish Republic (1934)

Seat N of the Real Academia Española
- In office 31 October 1920 – 18 December 1936
- Preceded by: Benito Pérez Galdós
- Succeeded by: Manuel Machado

18th President of the Spanish Royal Physics Society
- In office 1920
- Preceded by: Domingo de Orueta
- Succeeded by: Ricardo Aranaz e Izaguirre

3rd President of the Royal Spanish Mathematical Society
- In office 1920–1924
- Preceded by: Zoel García de Galdeano
- Succeeded by: Luis Octavio de Toledo y Zulueta

7th President of the Spanish Royal Academy of Sciences
- In office 1928–1934
- Preceded by: José Rodríguez Carracido
- Succeeded by: Blas Cabrera
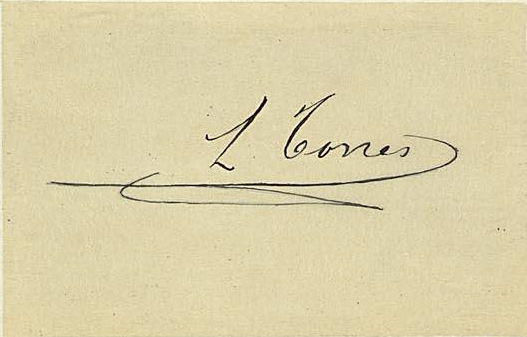
- Signature

Leonardo Torres Quevedo (Spanish: [leoˈnaɾðo ˈtores keˈβeðo]; 28 December 1852 – 18 December 1936) was a Spanish civil engineer, mathematician, and inventor who developed numerous engineering innovations related to aerial trams, airships, catamarans, and remote control. He was also a pioneer in the fields of computing and robotics, while maintaining an active role in several scientific and cultural institutions. He held prominent positions, such as Seat N of the Real Academia Española (1920–1936) and the presidency of the Spanish Royal Academy of Sciences (1928–1934). In 1927, he became a foreign associate of the French Academy of Sciences.

His first innovative design was a cableway system patented in 1887 for the safe transport of passengers, an endeavor that led to the Mount Ulia aerial ropeway in 1907 and culminated in 1916 with the opening of the Whirlpool Aero Car at Niagara Falls. In the 1890s, Torres focused his efforts on analog computation. He published Sur les machines algébriques (1895) and Machines à calculer (1901), technical studies that earned him recognition in France for his construction of machines capable of solving real and complex roots of polynomials. At the beginning of the 20th century, he made significant aeronautical contributions by developing the non-rigid Astra-Torres airships, whose trilobed structure helped the British and French armies counter Germany's submarine warfare during World War I. This work in aeronautics led him to become a key figure in the development of radio control systems between 1901 and 1905 with the Telekino, which introduced modern wireless remote control operation principles.

From his Laboratory of Automatics established in Madrid in 1907, Torres built El Ajedrecista (The Chess Player) in 1912, an electromagnetic device capable of playing a chess endgame which demonstrated that machines could follow specific rules and heuristics, contributing to early developments in physical automata and artificial intelligence. Expanding upon the work of Charles Babbage, Torres published Essays on Automatics (1914), where he explored theories of thinking machines and designed a special-purpose electromechanical calculator that conceptually foreshadowed floating-point arithmetic. British historian Brian Randell described it as "a fascinating work which well repays reading even today." Torres later demonstrated the feasibility of an electromechanical analytical engine by successfully producing a typewriter-controlled calculating machine in 1920.

Before his retirement in 1930, Torres conceived other advanced designs, particularly in the field of naval architecture. Among the most notable were the Buque campamento (Camp-Vessel, 1913), a balloon carrier designed to transport airships attached to a mooring mast of his invention, and the Binave (Twin Ship, 1916), a multihull steel vessel featuring flexible structural joints and independent propulsion systems that solved the stability and torsion issues of earlier catamarans. In addition to his interests in engineering, Torres also stood out in the field of letters and was a prominent speaker and supporter of Esperanto.

== Early life and education ==
Torres was born on December 28, 1852, the Day of the Holy Innocents, in Santa Cruz de Iguña, Cantabria, Spain. His father, Luis Torres Vildósola y Urquijo (1818–1891), was a civil engineer in Bilbao, where he worked as a railway engineer. His mother was Valentina Quevedo de la Maza (1825–1891). He had two siblings, Joaquina (b. 1851) and Luis (1855–1923). The family resided mainly in Bilbao, although they also spent long periods at his mother's family home in the Cantabrian mountains. He was a first cousin of the Spanish naval officer and inventor Joaquín Bustamante y Quevedo (1847–1898). During his childhood, he spent long periods of time away from his parents due to their work trips. Therefore, he was cared for by his father's relatives, the Barrenechea sisters, who declared him heir to their properties, which facilitated his future independence.

He completed his secondary schooling at the Instituto de Enseñanza Media in Bilbao and moved to Paris in 1868, attending the Christian Brothers' school for two years to further his studies. There, he became familiar with French culture and language, which later facilitated his scientific and technical collaborations with foreign institutions. In 1870, his father was transferred to Madrid, relocating the family. The following year, Torres began his higher education at the School of Civil Engineering. He temporarily interrupted his studies in 1873 to enlist as a volunteer on the Liberal side, alongside his brother Luis, in the defense of Bilbao against Carlist forces during the Third Carlist War. After the siege of Bilbao was lifted in 1874, he returned to Madrid and graduated in 1876, ranking fourth in a class of seven.

== Career ==
After graduating, Torres worked as a civil engineer for a few months on railway projects for the Compañía de Ferrocarriles del Noroeste, as his father had done, before resigning from the state civil engineering corps. Having inherited a considerable family fortune, he set out on an extended tour of Europe—visiting Italy, France, and Switzerland—to study the scientific and technical advances of the era. He later explained his decision, stating: "Taking a position in the Civil Service, I was convinced of my lack of love for the methodical and disciplined work of offices, and I resigned from it to dedicate myself to thinking about my own things." Upon returning to Spain in 1877, he settled in Santander to pursue his independent, self-funded research.

=== Cableways ===
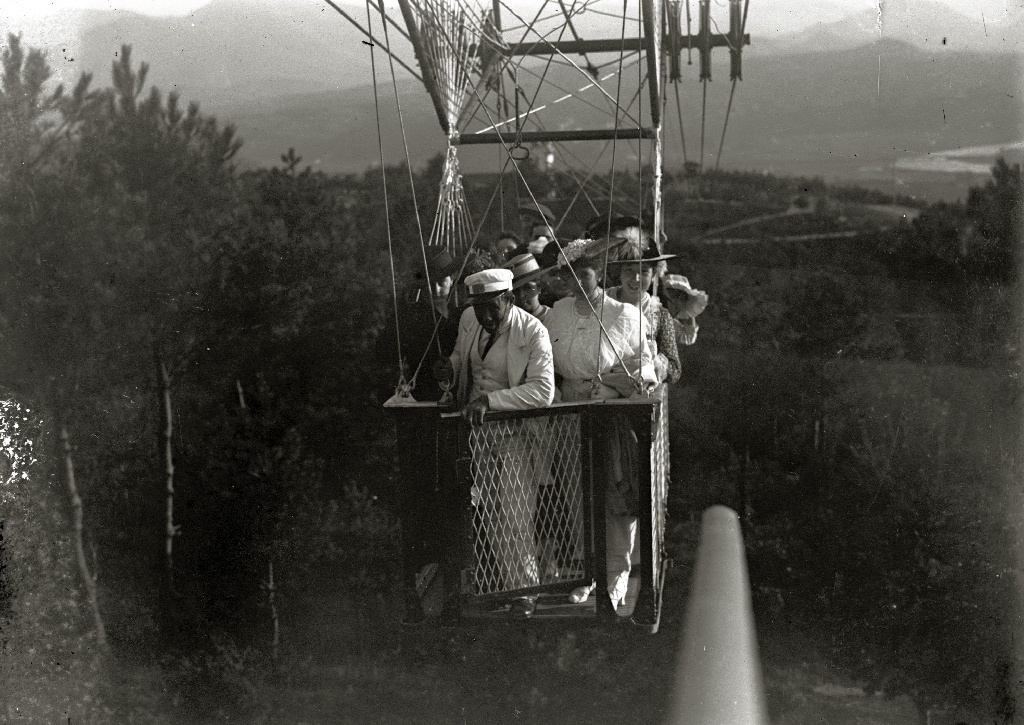
Mount Ulia aerial ropeway (1916), opened in 1907

Torres' studies in the field of cableways began around 1880, during his residence in his hometown of Molledo. There, in 1885, in the surroundings of the Casa de Doña Jimena in Portolín, he constructed the first cableway, which spanned a depression of some 40 metres (130 ft). The cableway was about 200 metres (660 ft) wide and carried a single person seated in a chair suspended from a cable, with another traction cable. The engine used to move the human cargo was a pair of cows. In 1887, he would build a much larger, motorized cableway over the Río León in Valle de Iguña, but it was intended solely for transporting materials.

These experiments formed the basis of his first patent application on 17 September 1887, in Spain, titled "Un sistema de camino funicular aéreo de alambres múltiples" ("A multi-wire suspended aerial system"), Designed as a passenger cableway, it achieved a level of safety suitable for transporting people, not rather than just materials. The patent was later extended to the United States, Austria, Germany, France, the United Kingdom, and Italy. His design introduced a multiple-cable support arrangement in which one end of each cable is secured to a fixed anchor, while the other is attached via a pulley mechanism to movable counterweights. As a result, the axial tension of the cables remains constant and equal to the weight of the counterweight, regardless of the car's load. Instead, a heavier load increases the deflection of the cables as the counterweight rises. This ensures that the cables' safety factor is precisely known and independent of the payload, resulting in a highly robust structure that remains safe even if a support cable fails.

In April 1889, Torres presented the patent of his cableway system in Switzerland. He used his own fortune to begin installing a line at Mount Pilatus (between Pilatus-Kulm and Klimsenhorn). It was an aerial funicular with a length of 2 km and a gradient of 300 m. In 1890 he traveled to that country to convince different authorities of its construction. He failed to convince the Swiss authorities, who did not grant any reliability to the work of a Spanish engineer due to contemporary skepticism—and even ridicule in the Swiss satirical magazine Eulen Spiegel—surrounding early aerial transport systems. By 1896, he abandoned the project; this disappointment, known as the "Swiss failure", led him to focus on other fields for several years. On 30 September 1907, Torres inaugurated his first cableway intended for safe public transport, the Mount Ulia aerial ropeway in San Sebastián. The journey was 280 meters, with a drop of 28 meters, lasted for just over three minutes, and the gondola had the capacity to board up to 18 people on each trip. The execution of the project was the responsibility of the Bilbao Society of Engineering Studies and Works, founded in 1906 by Valentín Gorbeña to develop and commercialize Torres' patents. The Mount Ulia aerial ropeway ceased operations in 1917, serving as a precedent for similar passenger transport systems in other countries.

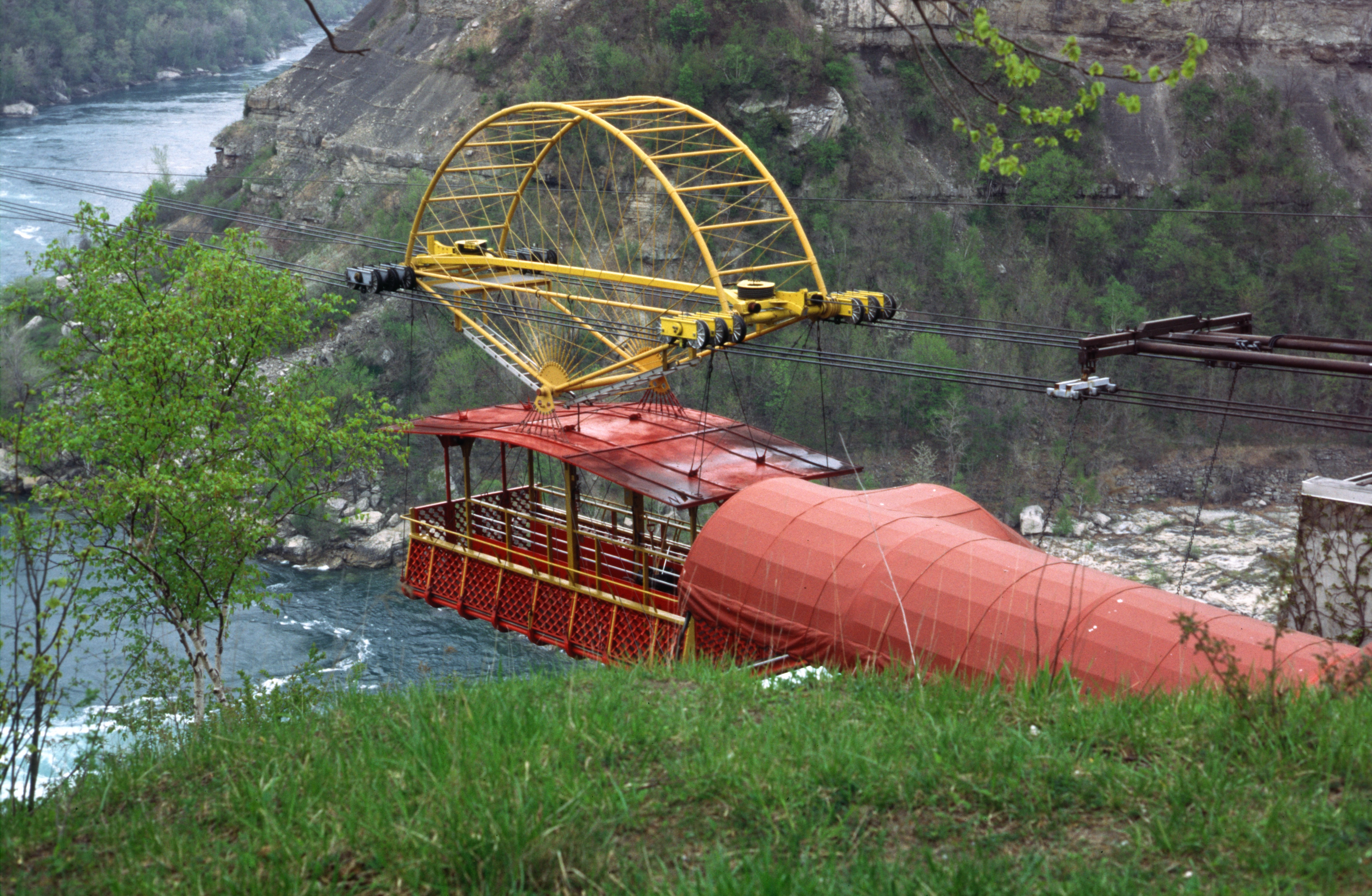
Whirlpool Aero Car over the Niagara River in Ontario, Canada

The successful outcome and practical viability of this type of aerial tramway encouraged him to install a much larger one in North America. In 1911, together with Valentín Gorbeña, Torres traveled to the United States and Canada, which gave him the opportunity to design the Spanish Aerocar—based on an idea by J. Enoch Thompson—at Niagara Falls. The 550-meter-long cableway crosses the whirlpool in the Niagara Gorge on the Canadian side. It travels at about 7.2 kilometres per hour (4.5 mph). The load per cableway is 9 tonnes (9.9 short tons), with a safety factor for the cables of 4.6, and carries up to 45 passengers. For its construction and assembly, the Niagara Spanish Aerocar Company Limited was created in 1914 from the Society of Engineering Studies and Works—which had secured the licence a year earlier—with a capital of $110,000 (roughly $3.5 million in 2025), and a planned 20-year concession. Gorbeña headed the company, with Torres and prominent Basque industrialists on its executive board. The construction took place between 1915 and 1916. The project was managed by Torres's son, Gonzalo Torres Polanco. It completed its first tests on February 15, 1916, and was officially inaugurated on August 8, opening to the public the following day. The system remains in operation with only minor modifications and has become a notable tourist and engineering landmark.

The Aero Car is considered the sole surviving example of Torres' design for an aerial ferry. Built and operated in Canada, it represents a fully Spanish-engineered project from conception to execution, designed by Torres and constructed by a Spanish company financed with Spanish capital. A plaque, mounted on a boulder in front of Aero Car Gift Shop recalls this fact: International Historic Civil Engineering Site. The Niagara Spanish Aerocar. A tribute to the distinguished Spanish Engineer who designed the Niagara Spanish Aerocar. This was only one of his many outstanding contributions to the engineering profession. Engineer Leonardo Torres Quevedo (1852–1936). Constructed 1914–1916. CSCE. The Canadian Society for Civil Engineering. 2010. Asociación de Ingenieros de Caminos, Canales y Puertos de España. Spanish aerial ferry of the Niagara.

=== Analog calculating machines ===
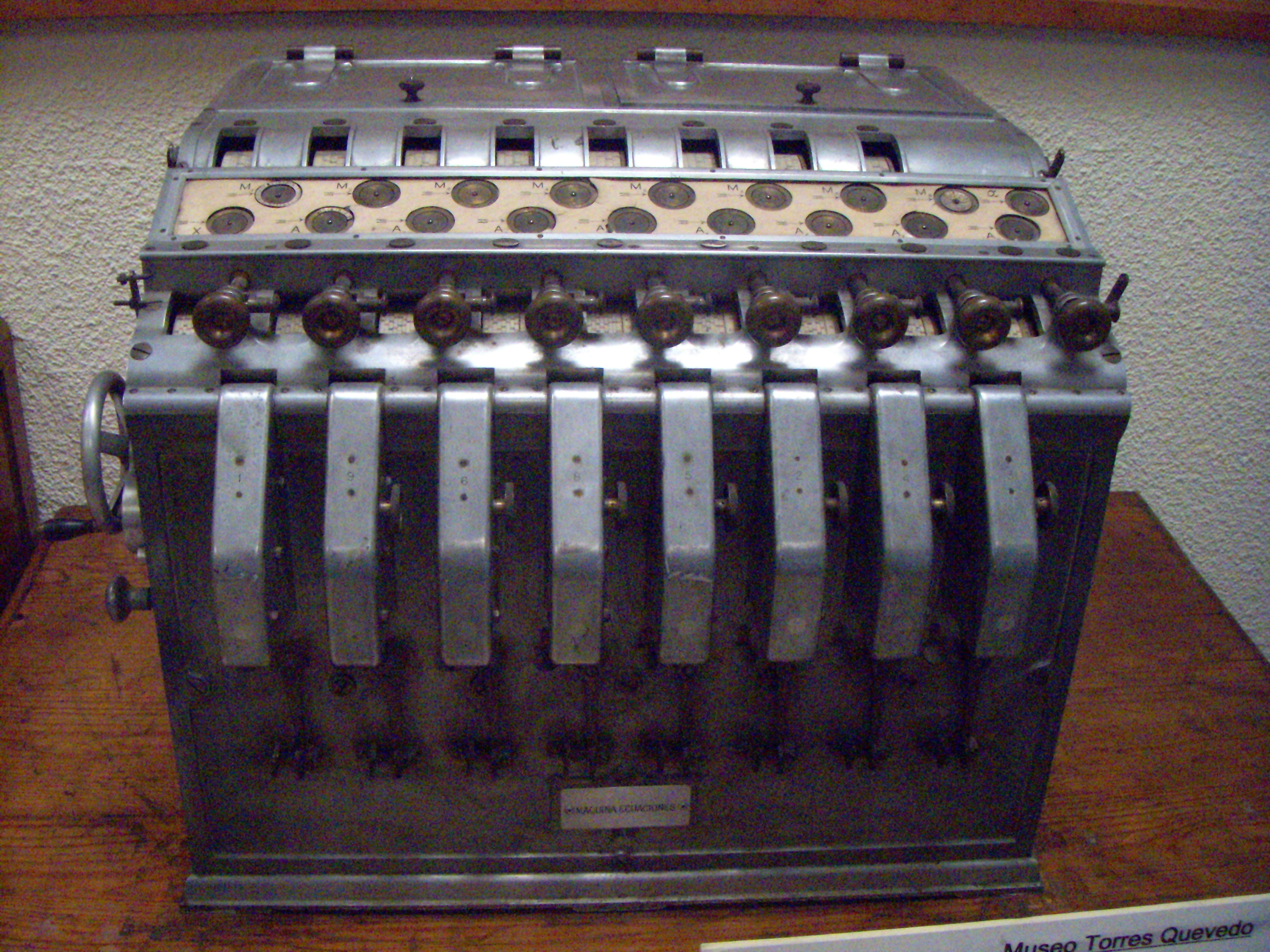
Algebraic machine

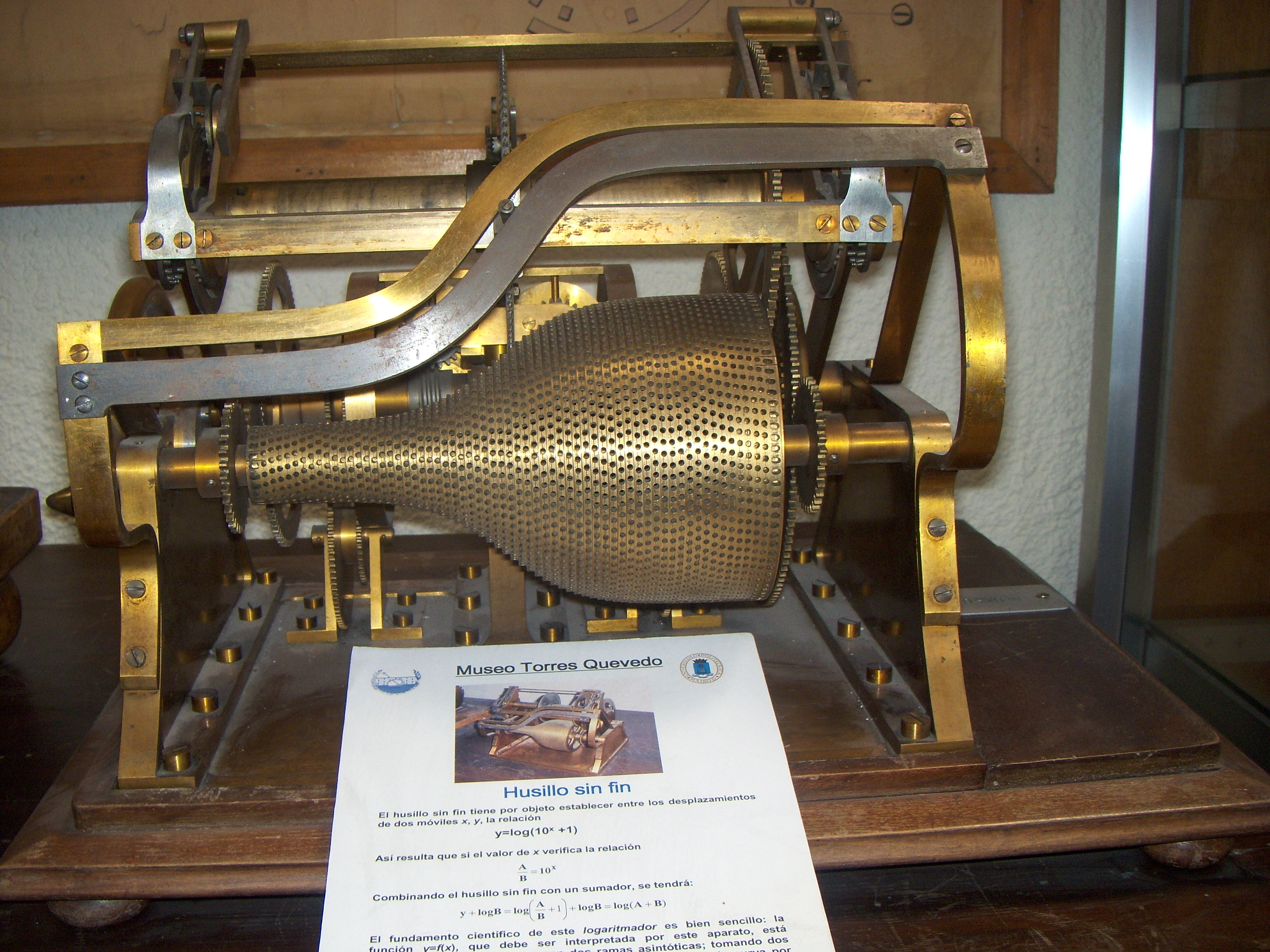
Endless spindle

Since the mid-19th century, several mechanical devices had been devised—including James and William Thomson's integrators, various multipliers, and Charles Babbage's never-completed analytical engine—setting the stage for Torres' own developments in the field. In 1893 he presented the "Memória sobre las máquinas algébricas" ("Memoir on Algebraic Machines") at the Spanish Royal Academy of Sciences in Madrid. This paper was commented on in a report by Eduardo Saavedra in January 1894 and published in the Revista de Obras Públicas. Saavedra, who considered Torres' calculating machines as "an extraordinary event in the course of Spanish scientific production", recommended that the final project be financed.

In August 1895, Torres presented "Sur les machines algébriques", accompanied by a demonstration model, at the Bordeaux Congress of the Association française pour l'avancement des sciences. That same year, the paper was also submitted to the French Academy of Sciences, appearing in its Comptes rendus. In 1900, he presented a comprehensive study, "Machines à calculer" ("Calculating machines") to the same institution; a summary was published in their journal on 19 February, followed by the full memoir in the Mémoires de l'Institut de France in 1901. The commission formed by Marcel Deprez, Henri Poincaré and Paul Appell, asked the academy for its publication, where they reported favorably: "In Mécanique analytique, Joseph-Louis Lagrange considers material systems whose connections are expressed by relationships between the coordinates or parameters used to define the position of the system. We can, and this is what Mr. Torres does, take the opposite point of view." Concluding: "In short, Mr. Torres has given a theoretical, general and complete solution to the problem of the construction of algebraic and transcendental relations by means of machines; moreover, he has effectively constructed machines that are easy to use for the solution of certain types of algebraic equations that are frequently encountered in applications." A commercial model of his algebraic machine was subsequently marketed from Paris by the precision instrument firm Château Père & Fils. His memoir "Machines algébriques" was also published in Belgium in April 1902 in the Revue des questions scientifiques of the Société scientifique de Bruxelles.

Torres' works examined the mathematical and physical analogies underlying analogical calculation or continuous quantities, and how to mechanically establish the relationships between them, expressed in mathematical formulas. The study included complex variables and used the logarithmic scale. From a practical standpoint, he demonstrated that mechanisms such as rotating discs could be used indefinitely with precision, so that changes in the variables were unlimited in both directions. Torres developed a whole series of analog mechanical calculating machines that used certain elements known as arithmophores, which consisted of a movable part and an index that allowed the quantity to be read according to its position. The aforementioned movable part was a graduated disc or drum that rotated on an axis. The angular movements were proportional to the logarithms of the magnitudes to be represented. Between 1910 and 1920, using several of these elements, Torres built an algebraic machine capable of calculating the roots of arbitrary polynomials of order eight, including complex ones, with an accuracy of up to thousandths. This machine could calculated the equation: $\alpha = \frac{A_1 X^a + A_2 X^b + A_3 X^c + A_4 X^d + A_5 X^e}{A_6 X^f + A_7 X^g + A_8 X^h} \,$ where X is the variable and A_{1} ... A_{8} is the coefficient of each term. Considering the case of α = 1, the following formula is obtained, and the root of the algebraic equation can be found: $A_1 X^a + A_2 X^b + A_3 X^c + A_4 X^d + A_5 X^e - A_6 X^f - A_7 X^g - A_8 X^h = 0 \,$

When calculating each term on a logarithmic scale, they can be calculated using only sums and products such as A_{1} + a × log(X), which can handle a very wide range of values, and the relative error during the calculation is constant regardless of the size of the value. However, to calculate the sum of each term, it is necessary to accurately obtain log(u + v) from the calculated values log(u) and log(v) on a logarithmic scale. For this calculation, Torres invented a unique mechanism called the "endless spindle" ("fusee sans fin"), a complex differential gear that uses a helical gear shaped like a wine bottle, which allowed the mechanical expression of the relation $y=\log(10^x+1)$. Putting log(u) – log(v) = log(u/v) = V, then u/v = 10 V, and the following formula is used to calculate log(u + v): $\log (u + v) = \log (v (u / v + 1)) = \log (v) + \log (u / v + 1) = \log (v) + \log(10^V + 1)\,$, the same technique that is the basis of the modern electronic logarithmic number system.

Torres also devised another machine around 1900 with a small computing mechanism using gears and linkages to obtain the complex number solution of the quadratic equation X^{2} – pX + q = 0, and an integrator to solve first-order differential equations. This mechanical phase later evolved into electromechanics, which he used to design and construct analytical machines. Nowadays, Torres' machines are kept in the Torres Quevedo Museum at the School of Civil Engineering of the Technical University of Madrid.

=== Aeronautics ===
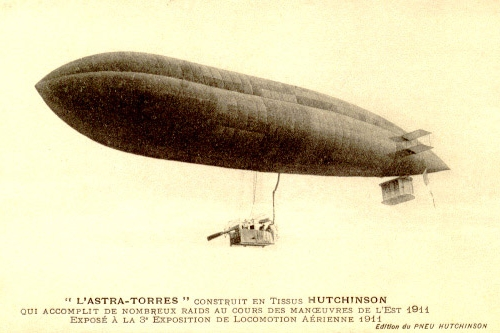
Airship Astra-Torres No.1 at an air show in 1911

In 1902, Torres started the project of a non-rigid, trilobed-shape dirigible designed to solve the serious problem of gondola suspension by including an interior framework of flexible cables that provided rigidity to the airship through internal pressure, a principle known as "autorigid". He applied for a patent in France entitled "Perfectionnements aux aerostats dirigibles" ("Improvements in dirigible aerostats"), wrote a "Note sur le calcul d'un ballon dirigeable a quille et suspentes interieures" ("Note on the calculus of a dirigible balloon with interior suspension and keel"), and presented both to Madrid and Paris' Academies of Science. Following favorable reports by José Echegaray in Madrid and Paul Appell in Paris, the Academy forwarded the proposal to Spain's Ministry of War to seek legislative backing for its development. By the end of that year the report at Paris's Academy of Science was included in the French magazine L'Aérophile, and English-language summaries were published in the British Nature and The Aeronautical Journal.

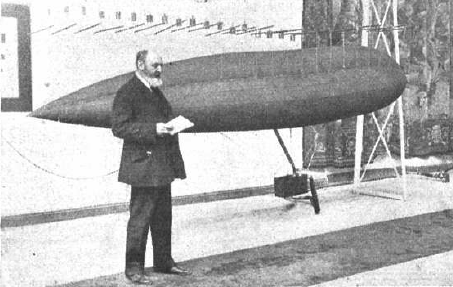
Torres with a model of his airship in 1913

Torres was appointed director of the Centre for Aeronautical Research in Madrid in January 1904, a civil institution created by the government of Spain "for the technical and experimental study of the air navigation problem and the management of remote engine maneuvers." From March 1905, with Army Engineer Captain Alfredo Kindelán as Technical Assistant, he supervised the construction of the first Spanish dirigible in the Army Military Aerostatics Service, located in Guadalajara, which was completed in June 1908. The new airship, named Torres Quevedo in his honor, made successful test flights with passengers in the gondola. However, Torres parted company with the Army and was compelled to leave the Park in Guadalajara. Despite this, between 1907 and 1909 he had requested improved patents for his airship in the United Kingdom and France. He moved all the material to a rented hangar in Sartrouville (Paris), beginning a collaboration with the Société Astra, a new Aeronautical Society integrated in the conglomerate of French petroleum businessman Henri Deutsch de la Meurthe and directed by industrialist Édouard Surcouf. In January 1910, the Astra company purchased the patent rights with a cession for all countries except Spain, allowing free use of the system in Torres's home country. Commercialization of the invention progressed with the signing of a contract between Torres and Surcouf on February 12. Under this agreement, the French company agreed to bear all manufacturing and operational expenses, while the inventor would receive royalties of three francs for each cubic metre of airship volume sold. In 1911, development began on the dirigibles known as the Astra-Torres airships.

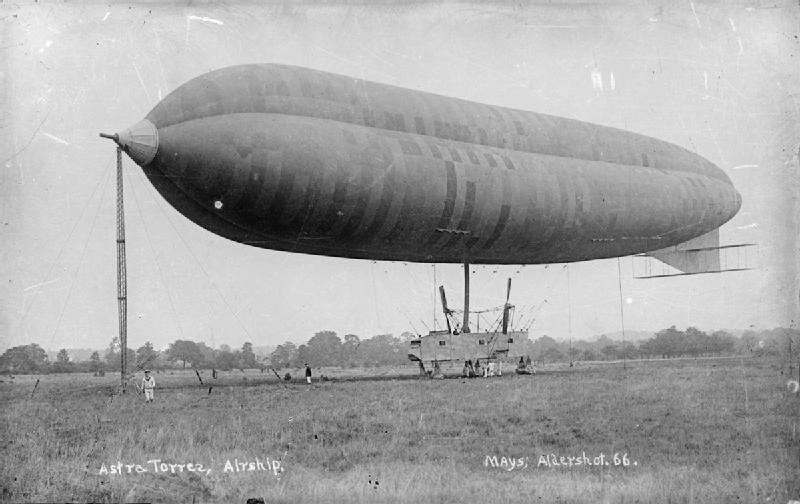
Airship Astra-Torres XIV (HMA No. 3) attached to a portable mooring post in 1913

In 1910, Torres also conceptualized a docking system to address the numerous difficulties engineers encountered when securing airships. His concept involved anchoring the craft's bow to a mooring mast, enabling the vehicle to pivot freely with changing wind directions. By tethering the bow to the top of a grounded metal tower via cable, dirigibles could be safely moored outdoors under any weather conditions. Moreover, the design envisioned enhanced infrastructure at temporary landing zones to facilitate passenger disembarkation. Patented in Belgium in February 1911— and then in the United Kingdom and France in 1912—the system was officially titled "Improvements in Mooring Arrangements for Airships." Towers based on his design became standard industry practice, significantly improving aircraft accessibility and eliminating the labor-intensive process of manual hangar storage.

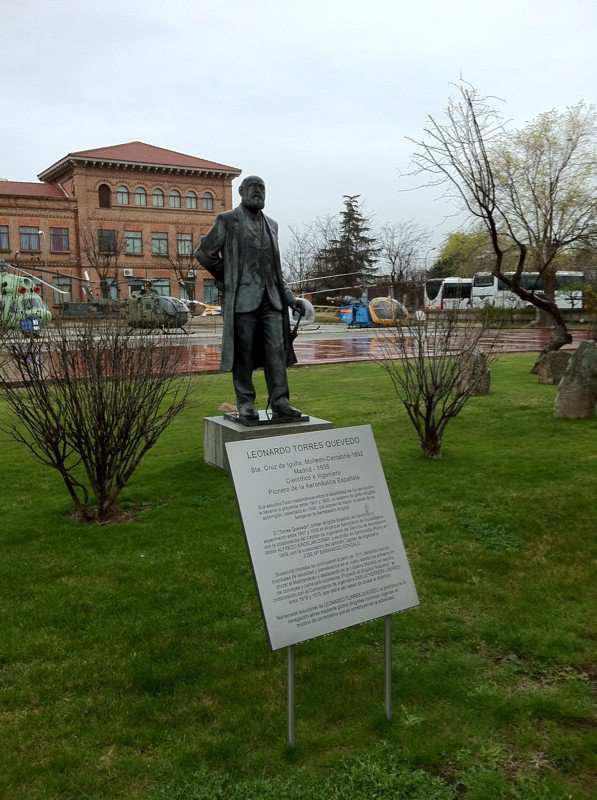
Statue of Leonardo Torres Quevedo at the Museum of Aeronautics and Astronautics in Madrid

In February 1911, trials of the Astra-Torres No. 1 conducted at Issy-les-Moulineaux, south-west of Paris, proved successful. The airship, with a volume of 1,590 m³, reached speeds of up to 53 km/h. In May 1911, it won the Deperdussin Prize after recording the fastest time for a dirigible over a predetermined 100-kilometre circular course. Following this achievement, the airship participated alongside French military forces in the Bastille Day parade at Longchamp on 14 July. Subsequent Astra-Torres designs included the Astra-Torres XIV (designated HMA No. 3 to the Royal Naval Air Service), which in September 1913 set a new world speed record for airships by reaching 83.2 km/h, and the Pilâtre de Rozier (Astra-Torres XV) named after the aerostier Jean-François Pilâtre de Rozier, which at 24,300 m³ was the same size of the German 'Zeppelins', reaching speeds of around 85 km/h.

The distinctive trilobed envelope was also employed in the United Kingdom in the Coastal, C Star, and North Sea airships. The Entente powers used these dirigibles during the First World War (1914–1918) for diverse tasks, principally to the escort of convoys, the continuous surveillance of coasts and the search, from bases in Marseille, Tunisia and Algeria, for German submarines in the Bay of Biscay, the English Channel and the Mediterranean Sea. In 1919, based on a proposal by engineer Emilio Herrera Linares, Torres designed a transatlantic dirigible named Hispania to demonstrate the capability of a scheduled passenger service between Spain and the Americas. The project aimed to achieve the first transatlantic flight for Spain, and was patented in both Spain and France. Financial difficulties ultimately led to its abandonment.

The success of Torres' trilobed design during the war even drew the attention of the Imperial Japanese Navy in 1922, who acquired the Nieuport AT-2, which was nearly 263 ft long, maximum diameter 54 ft, had a hydrogen capacity of 363,950 ft³, and featured a cruising speed of 29 mph with a range of 970 miles. This type of non-rigid airship continued to be manufactured in various countries during the postwar era, notably by the French Zodiac Company in the 1930s. Several structural features from Torres' patents also reappeared in later airship designs. In 1929, Goodyear introduced an internal catenary suspension system on its experimental K-1 blimp, a layout later adopted across US Navy non-rigid airships such as the K-, M-, and N-classes. Between 1902 and 1919, he also patented internal triangular-section keels, an arrangement later seen in interwar Italian semi-rigids and in the Zeppelin NT, which entered service in 1997. Decades after the Astra-Torres era, the trilobed hull form was tested again in projects such as the French meteorological airship Dinosaure in 1977.

=== The Telekino ===
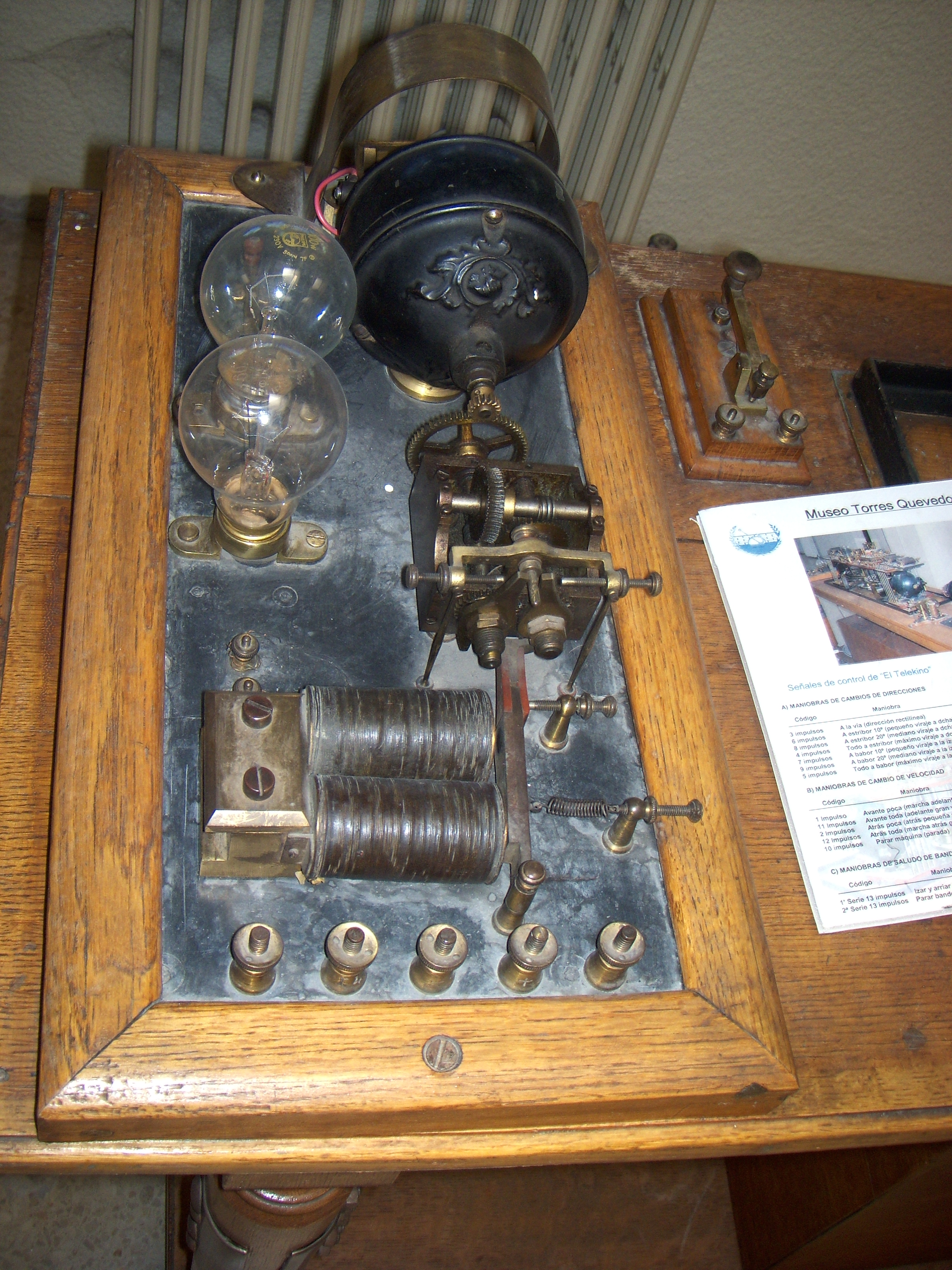
Telekino: transmitter.

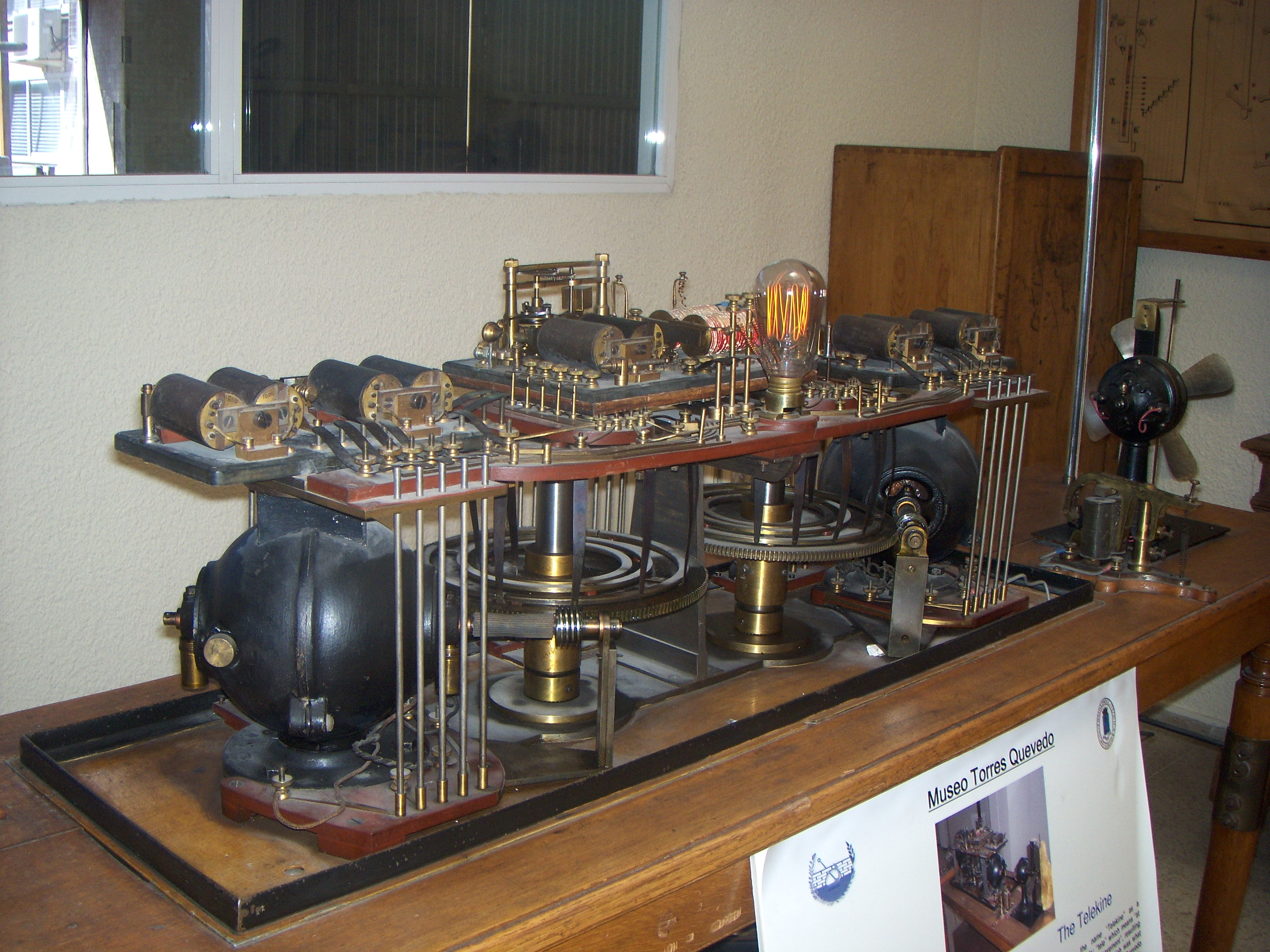
Telekino: receiver.

Around 1901, Torres began developing remote control technology to test his airship designs without putting human lives at risk. Between 1902 and 1903, he patented a radio control system in France, Spain, the United States, and the United Kingdom, under the name "Système dit Télékine pour commander à distance un mouvement mécanique" ("Means or method for directing mechanical movements at or from a distance").

On 3 August 1903, Torres presented the Telekino—a term derived from the Greek words tele (distant) and kino (movement)—at the Paris Academy of Sciences, alongside a detailed memoir and a practical demonstration. He created a system of distinct, easily readable code words by using signals from a common wireless telegraph transmitter, and built a new type of receiver capable of reacting differently to each specific codeword sent. This process determined the position of a needle, which in turn regulated a servomotor—functioning as a controller, switch, or motor—to actuate the apparatus. José Echegaray praised the Telekino as a material device capable of interpreting instructions "as if it were intelligent", referring to its operation as a form of "disciplined intelligence". For the construction of this first prototype, Torres received assistance from Gabriel Koenigs, director of the Laboratory of Mechanics at the Sorbonne, and Octave Rochefort, who provided the wireless telegraphy equipment.

Between late 1904 and early 1905, Torres chose to conduct initial Telekino testings in the Beti Jai fronton of Madrid—the temporary headquarters of his Centre for Aeronautical Research until 1907—first in an electric three-wheeled land vehicle with an effective range of just 20 to 30 meters, which has been considered the first known example of a radio-controlled unmanned ground vehicle (UGV). Complex trials were followed by extending the use of his Telekino to remotely control the maneuvers of a boat on the pond of the Casa de Campo in Madrid, achieving distances of up to about 250 m. In November 1905, Torres tested the electric boat Vizcaya on the Bilbao Abra bay from the terrace of the Club Marítimo. In the presence of the president of the Provincial Council and other authorities, he guided the boat from the shore with a crew of eight people on board and demonstrating a range of over 2 kilometers. These trials attracted significant international press attention. By applying the Telekino to electrically powered vessels, Torres could independently select different positions for the steering engine and different speeds for the propelling engine. He was also able to operate other mechanisms simultaneously, such as switching a light on or off, or raising and lowering a flag. Specifically, he could perform up to 19 different pulse-coded actions with his prototypes.

Telekino working

The positive results of those experiences prompted him to request financial assistance from the Spanish government to use the Telekino for steering submarine torpedoes, offering to waive any compensation if military trials failed. However, the Ministry of Navy denied his request in March 1906, citing high economic costs and bureaucratic requirements. This decision was criticized by the contemporary Spanish scientific press, which contrasted the government's reluctance with the ongoing international race for telemechanics. On 25 September 1906, Torres demonstrated the system again in the Port of Bilbao by guiding the electric boat Vizcaya—capable of 6 to 7 knots—through port and starboard turns, forward and reverse maneuvers at full, half, and quarter speeds, and stopping at will, before a crowd that included King Alfonso XIII, government officials, and scientific delegations, but further institutional support never materialized.

Previously, in July 1906, Torres had already written to the Bulletin de la Société Internationale des Électriciens to contest the priority of the wireless remote-control apparatus used by French engineer Devaux during the Antibes naval trials; after the society declined to publish his claim, he published the correspondence alongside his 1903 French patent and Devaux's report in the journal of the Spanish Royal Academy of Sciences. Similarly, in January 1907, French inventor Gustave Gabet presented a wireless telemechanics device to the Paris Academy of Sciences based on a "delayed contact" principle. Torres formally contested Gabet's claims by submitting a note titled Le télékine et la télémécanique. Réclamation de priorité, which was received during the Academy's session on 4 March. In the text, Torres stated that this operating principle and its technical solutions were identical to those he had already patented for his Telekino in France in 1903. The Academy officially recognized his priority claim, publishing the note in the Comptes Rendus on 6 May. The Telekino laid the groundwork for Torres' research in automatics, anticipating many of his later theoretical and practical developments.

=== Symbolic language for machine description ===
Torres introduced a formal language in Vienna in 1907 designed for the description of mechanical drawings and devices. He had previously published the concepts of this method in a paper titled "Sobre un sistema de notaciones y símbolos destinados a facilitar la descripción de las máquinas" ("System of notations and symbols intended to facilitate the description of machines") in the Revista de Obras Públicas. According to Austrian computer scientist Heinz Zemanek, this was equivalent to a programming language for the numerical control of machine tools.

Torres defined a table of symbols, established a set of rules, and applied them to a concrete example to demonstrate their technical viability. To illustrate this, he utilized one of his previously conceived algebraic devices: a calculator designed to solve the product of complex numbers, which he formally described under the title Mechanical construction of the formula $p(...) = p'(...) \times p''(...)$. Through this symbolic language, he sought to address the limitations in contemporary mechanical description and design methods. Regarding the challenges of this endeavor, Torres noted:

"Charles Babbage and Franz Reuleaux—and I suppose others as well, although I have no record of them—have tried, without success, to remedy this drawback; but although these eminent authors have failed, that should not be a sufficient reason to abandon such an important endeavor."

Despite the independent efforts of Babbage, Reuleaux, and Torres, the engineering field continued to rely primarily on descriptive geometry as its standard symbolic language.

=== Laboratory of Automatics ===
As a member of the steering committee of the Board for Advanced Studies and Scientific Research ("Junta para la Ampliación de Estudios e Investigaciones Científicas", JAE)—established in Madrid in January 1907 to promote scientific research and education in Spain—Torres played a leading role in creating three key state agencies. These agencies served as models for the JAE's multidisciplinary research support: the Laboratory of Automatics, which was established in February 1907 by expanding the functions of the laboratory annexed to the Centre for Aeronautical Research (active since 1904) with Torres appointed as its director; the Association of Laboratories (1910), which unified state laboratories and workshops for instrument construction; and the Institute of Scientific Materials (1911), which managed budget allocations.

The Laboratory of Automatics produced a wide variety of instruments, building its own inventions while providing essential support and services to JAE universities and researchers. Torres, physicist Blas Cabrera, and workshop head Juan Costa jointly designed several scientific instruments, including a Weiss-type electromagnet, an X-ray spectrometer, a remote-control mechanism for a Bunge scale, and a variable-height reservoir with micrometer movements for magneto-chemical measurements. Additionally, prominent scientists commissioned custom equipment from the workshop: Ángel del Campo—head of the Spectroscopy Section of the Laboratory of Physical Research and mentor to Miguel A. Catalán—ordered a spectrograph; Manuel Martínez Risco requested a Michelson-type variable-distance interferometer; Juan Negrín acquired a stalagmometer; Gonzalo Brañas had a mechanical magnetograph built; and Santiago Ramón y Cajal commissioned both a microtome and a panmicrotome, alongside a film projector.

The development of the Laboratory of Automatics reached its peak with the renovation of the Palace of the Arts and Industry, to house the School of Industrial Engineers, the JAE, and the National Museum of Natural Sciences, which also allowed the laboratory itself to expand. By the 1920s, Torres was assisted in the laboratory by his son, Gonzalo, together with a workshop of specialized mechanics who manually constructed his engineering designs. In July 1931, the laboratory was integrated into the newly established National Foundation for Scientific Research and Reform Testing (FNICER). This incorporation allowed the laboratory to extend its technical and logistical support nationwide, funding concrete research projects at the Cajal Institute, the Galicia Biological Mission, and the Royal Botanical Garden of Madrid, while equipping a new network of university laboratories in Valladolid, Zaragoza, and Oviedo. In 1939 the laboratory gave rise to the Torres Quevedo Institute of the Spanish National Research Council ("Consejo Superior de Investigaciones Científicas", CSIC).

=== El Ajedrecista ===
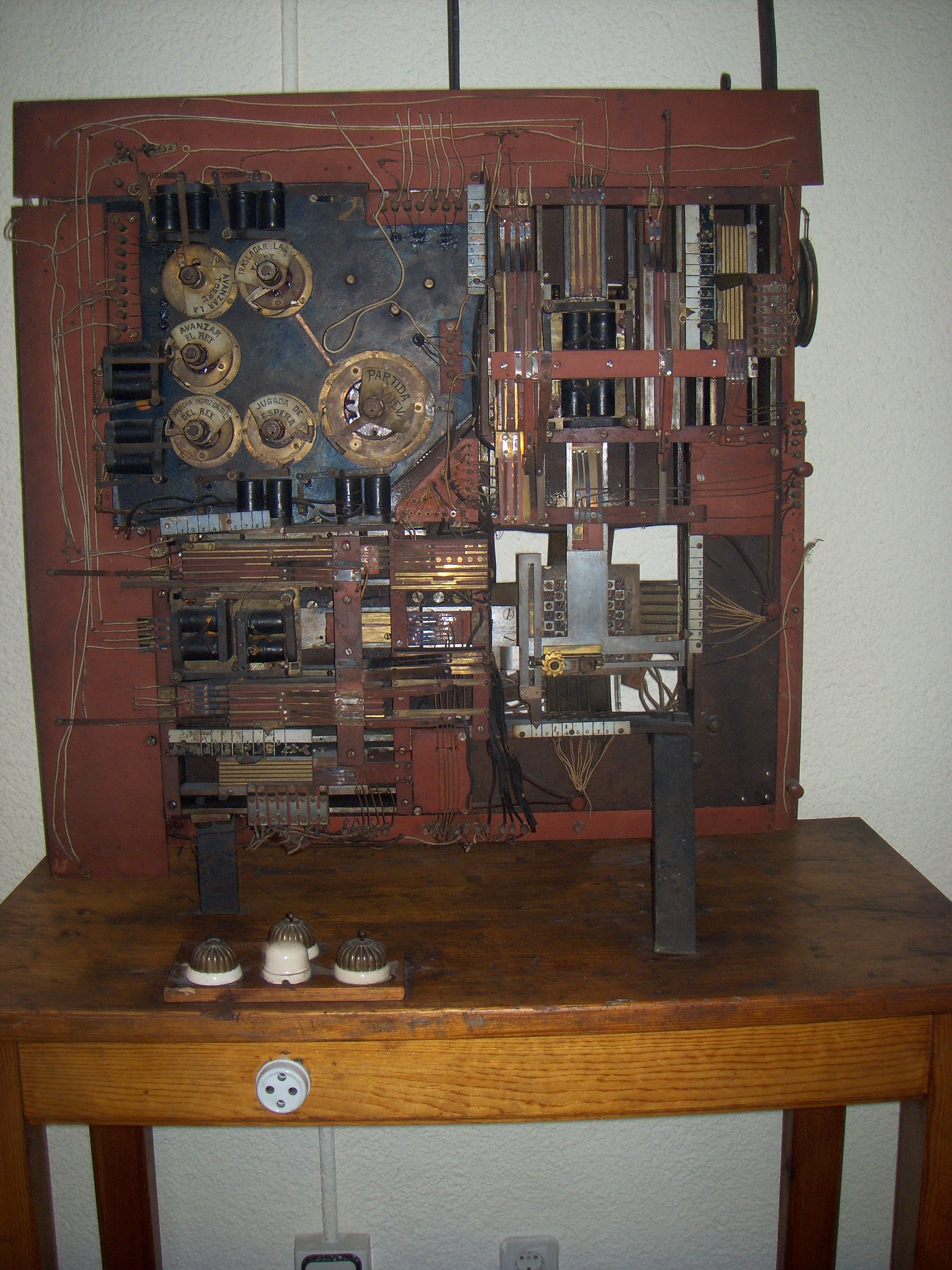
"El Ajedrecista" No. 1 (The Chessplayer), complete view

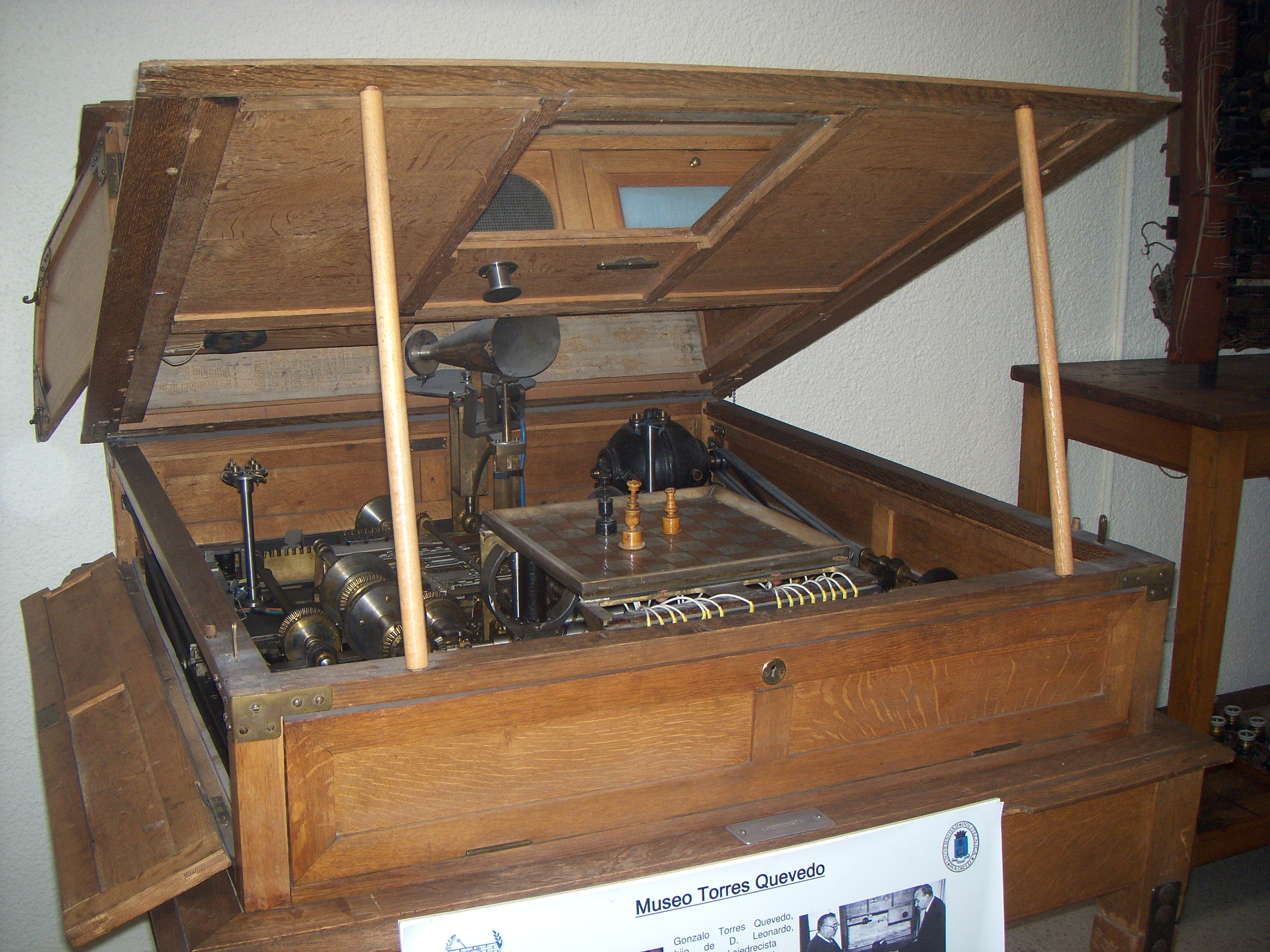
"El Ajedrecista" No. 2, interior view

In 1910, Torres prepared the designs for a chess-playing device—which he dubbed El Ajedrecista (The Chess Player)—and in 1911 he began its construction in his laboratory. As opposed to The Turk and Ajeeb, El Ajedrecista was an electromechanical automaton capable of playing a king and rook endgame against a human opponent. Operating without any human intervention, the automaton achieved true integration of its mechanical and logical components from any starting position.

The pieces had a metallic mesh at their base, which closed an electric circuit that encoded their position on a vertical chessboard. When the black king was moved by hand, an algorithm calculated and performed the next best move for the white player. To execute its moves and detect the opponent's responses, the automaton utilized a mechanical arm and electrical sensors. If an illegal move was made by the opposite player, the automaton would signal it by turning on a light. If the opposing player made three illegal moves, the automaton would stop playing. Due to the simplicity of its move-calculating algorithm, the automaton does not always deliver checkmate in the fewest moves possible, at times requiring more than the fifty moves permitted by the rules. However, it consistently defeated its opponents in every match. Claude Shannon, in his paper Programming a Computer for Playing Chess (1950), pointed out that Torres' idea was quite advanced for that period.

This FEN configuration and move sequence show how White executes Torres' algorithm to checkmate the black King:

[FEN "8/8/1k6/8/R7/8/5K2/8 w - - 0 1"]

1. Rh4 Kc5 2. Kf3 Kd5 3. Ke3 Kd6 4. Rh5 Kc6 5. Ke4 Kd6 6. Rg5 Kc6 7. Kd4 Kd6 8. Rg6+ Kd7 9. Kd5 Ke7 10. Rh6 Kf7 11. Ra6 Ke7 12. Rb6 Kf7 13. Ke5 Ke7 14. Rb7+ Kd8 15. Ke6 Kc8 16. Rh7 Kb8 17. Rg7 Ka8 18. Kd6 Kb8 19. Kc6 Ka8 20. Kb6 Kb8 21. Rg8#

Following its completion in 1912, the automaton was first demonstrated in June 1913 at the "Asociación Española para el Progreso de las Ciencias" in Madrid. It had its official public debut at the University of Paris in May 1914, where it drew great interest and was featured on the front page of Le Matin. Its internal construction was published by Henri Vigneron in the French magazine La Nature. On 6 November 1915 Scientific American magazine in their Supplement 2079 pp. 296–298 published an illustrated article entitled "Torres and His Remarkable Automatic Devices. He Would Substitute Machinery for the Human Mind". It was summarized as follows:

"The inventor claims that the limits within which thought is really necessary need to be better defined, and that the automaton can do many things that are popularly classed with thought".

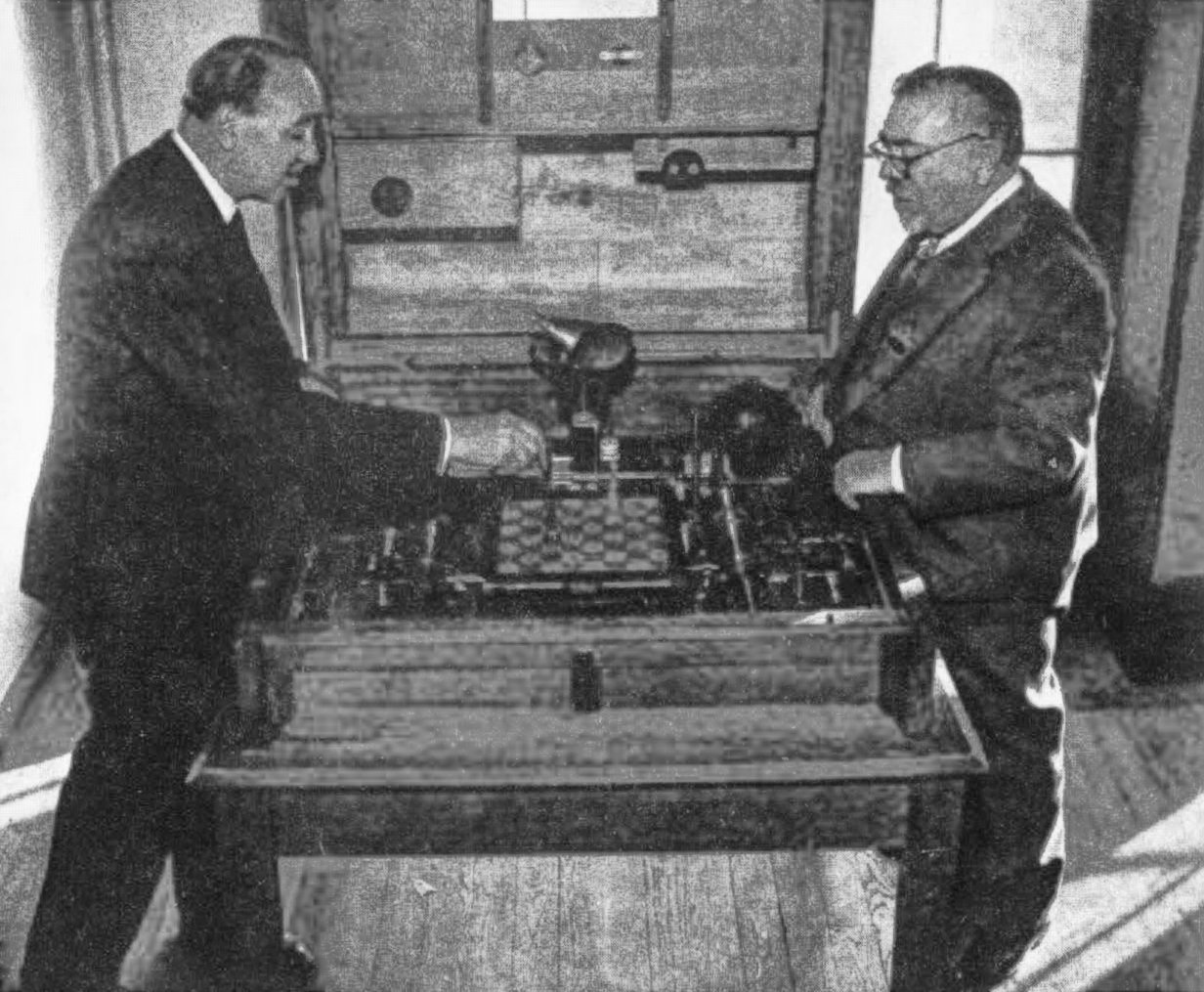
Gonzalo Torres showing the automaton designed by his father to Norbert Wiener at the 1951 Paris Conference

In November 1922, about to turn 70, Torres finished the construction designs of a second chess player, in which, under his direction, his son Gonzalo had introduced various improvements. The mechanical arm to move pieces were replaced for electromagnets located beneath a now-horizontal board, sliding the pieces from one square to another. This version included a phonograph record pronounced the words "echec et mat" when Black was checkmated. Torres initially presented it in June 1923 at the "Asociación Española para el Progreso de las Ciencias" congress in Salamanca. Gonzalo later exposed the second chess player at several international meetings, introducing it to a wider audience at the 1951 Paris conference Les Machines à Calculer et la Pensée Humaine. The French National Centre for Scientific Research (CNRS) organized the conference, where Norbert Wiener attended and took on the machine in a match on January 12th or 13th. El Ajedrecista also defeated Savielly Tartakower at the conference, being the first Grandmaster to lose against a chess-playing machine.

Between April and October 1958, it was presented at the Brussels World's Fair, where Heinz Zemanek, who played with the device, described it as "a historical witness of automaton artistry that was far ahead of its time. Torres created a perfect algorithm with 6 subrules which he realized with the technological means of that time, essentially with levers, gearwheels, and relays." While it lacks the stored-program architecture of modern computers, El Ajedrecista has been considered the first computer game, having executed automated decision-making and chess computations that preceded later software-based chess programs by several decades.

=== Essays on Automatics ===
It has been commonly assumed (see Metropolis and Worlton 1980) that Charles Babbage's work on a mechanical digital program-controlled computer, which he started in 1835 and pursued off and on until his death in 1871, had been completely forgotten and was only belatedly recognized as a forerunner to the modern digital computer. Ludgate, Torres y Quevedo, and Bush give the lie to this belief, and all made fascinating contributions that deserve to be better known.

— Brian Randell, presentation at MIT (1980), printed in Annals of the History of Computing, IEEE (October 1982)

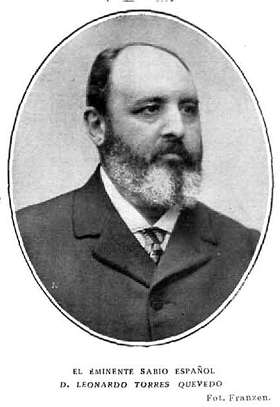
Leonardo Torres Quevedo photographed by Christian Franzen, La Ilustración Española y Americana, March 15, 1916

In January 1914, Torres published "Ensayos sobre Automática. Su definición. Extensión teórica de sus aplicaciones" (Essays on Automatics. Its Definition – Theoretical Extent of Its Applications) in the Revista de la Real Academia de Ciencias Exactas, Físicas y Naturales. It was translated into French in 1915 with the title "Essais sur l'Automatique" in the Revue Générale des Sciences Pures et Appliquées.

Within this paper, Torres introduced what he called Automática (Automatics), a proposed new branch of the theory of machines devoted to the study of automata capable of regulating their actions according to changing circumstances. He explored "another type of automaton of great interest: those that imitate, not the simple gestures, but the thoughtful actions of a man, and which can sometimes replace him", challenging Cartesian views on the inability of machines to imitate human reasoning. Torres distinguished between simpler automata, whose operation depended on fixed mechanical relationships, and a more advanced class whose relationships between operating parts could change "suddenly when necessary circumstances arise". Such automata would require sense organs, including "thermometers, magnetic compasses, dynamometers, manometers", together with mechanisms capable of carrying out the required operations and suitable power sources. He argued that the principal aim of Automatics was to endow machines with discernment, enabling them to take account of information received from their surroundings and adapt their behaviour accordingly. Such automata, he maintained, could make decisions provided that "the rules the automaton must follow are known precisely".

The paper provides the main link between Torres and Babbage. He gives a brief history of Babbage's efforts at constructing a mechanical Difference Engine and Analytical Engine. He described the Analytical Engine as exemplifying his theories as to the potential power of machines, and takes the problem of designing such an engine as a challenge to his skills as an inventor of electromechanical devices. It contains a complete design (albeit one that Torres regarded as theoretical rather than practical) for a machine capable of calculating completely automatically the value of the formula $a^x(y - z)^2$, for a sequence of sets of values of the variables involved. It demonstrates cunning electromechanical gadgets for storing decimal digits, for performing arithmetic operations using built-in function tables, and for comparing the values of two quantities. The whole machine was to be controlled from a read-only program (complete with provisions for conditional branching), represented by a pattern of conducting areas mounted around the surface of a rotating cylinder. The paper also contains an early description of a floating-point representation for numerical data, which historian Randell notes was described "almost casually". Torres proposed expressing numbers using a fixed number of significant digits together with a separate exponent indicating the order of magnitude, a practical convention intended to simplify mechanical computation by reducing the complexity required for numerical storage and processing. This representation is conceptually similar to modern floating-point notation. He did it in the following way:

"Very large numbers are as troublesome in mechanical calculations as in ordinary ones (Babbage planned 50 wheels to represent each variable, and even they would not be sufficient if we do not resort to the means that I will indicate later, or another analogous one). In the latter, the resulting inconveniences are ordinarily avoided by representing each quantity by a small number of significant figures (six or eight at most, except in exceptional cases) and indicating with a comma and with zeros, if necessary, the order of magnitude of the units represented by each figure.

Sometimes, to avoid writing many zeros, quantities are written in this form: $n \times 10^m$.

We could greatly simplify this notation by arbitrarily establishing three very simple rules:

1. n will always have the same number of digits (six, for example).

2. The first digit of n will be in the tenths place, the second in the hundredths place, and so on.

3. Each quantity will be written in this form: n; m.

Thus, instead of 2435.27 and 0.00000341682, we will write, respectively, 243527; 4 and 341862; −5.

I have not specified a limit to the value of the exponent; but it is evident that in all usual calculations it will be less than one hundred. Therefore, in this system, all the quantities involved in the calculations will be written using only eight digits."

The paper ends with a comparison of the advantages of electromechanical devices over the sort of mechanical devices that were all that were available to Babbage. Randell establishes that Torres would have been quite capable of building a general-purpose electromechanical computer more than 20 years ahead of its time, had the practical need, motivation, and financing been present.

=== Analytical machines ===
"The achievements of George Stibitz, Howard Aiken and IBM, and Konrad Zuse crown the transitional but crucial period of relays and their theorists. This stage on the path to automatic computing was built upon a concise and proven technology: that of electromagnetic relays. The modesty of this technological level serves to highlight the quality of the intellectual contributions of Torres y Quevedo, Alan Turing, and Claude Shannon."

— Robert Ligonnière, Préhistoire et Histoire des ordinateurs (1987)

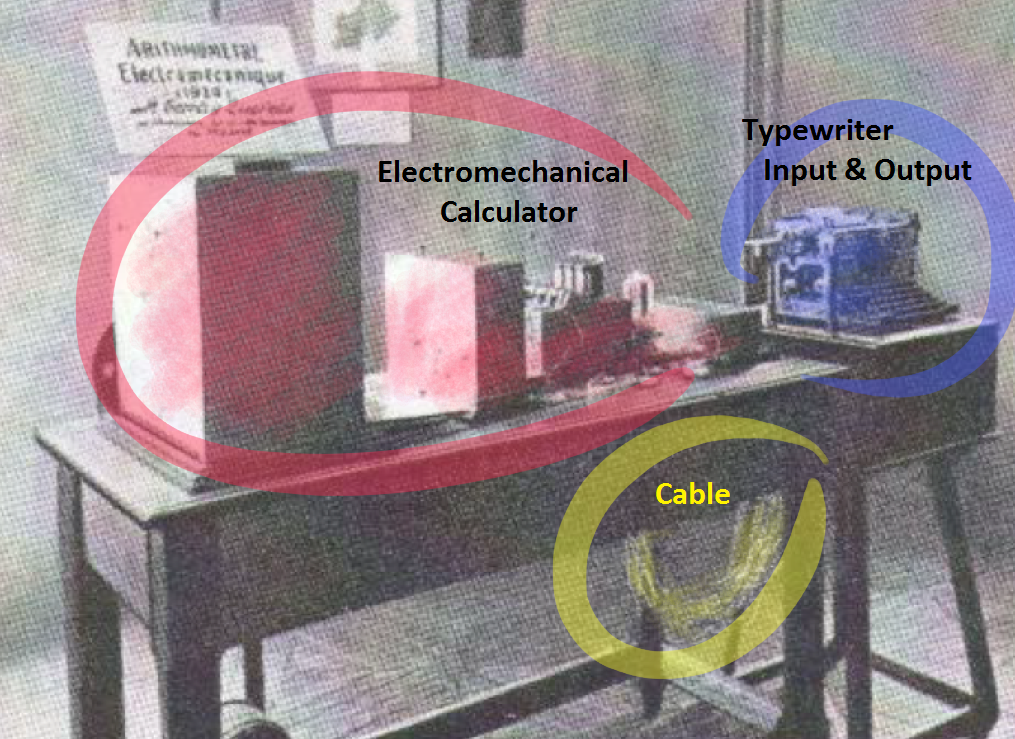
Torres Quevedo's 1920 Electromechanical Arithmometer, which used a remote typewriter to send commands to an electromechanical calculator and to print its results once computed

Torres subsequently constructed working prototypes based on his theoretical designs. In 1911, at the request of French mathematician Maurice d’Ocagne, he published a description of his complete electromechanical calculating machine in the Encyclopédie Scientifique. In 1914 and 1920, Torres demonstrated that wheel-work mechanisms in calculating machines—such as Babbage's—could be replaced with electromechanical components. His 1914 analytical machine was a scaled-down demonstration device exhibited in Paris; it used a small memory built with electromagnets to evaluate the expression $a=(p \times q)-B$ using very small numbers. By entering a series of values for p, q, and b, the machine calculated and recorded the resulting values of $a$. The practical feasibility of this electromechanical design was confirmed when the system reached completion in his 1920 device.

From June 5 to 13, 1920, the Exposition des machines à calculer anciennes et des machines purement scientifiques was held in Paris at the Hôtel de la Société d'encouragement pour l'industrie nationale to commemorate the centenary of Thomas de Colmar's mechanical arithmometer. During this event, Torres captured the attention of attendees with the demonstration of his "Arithmomètre Électromécanique" (Electromechanical Arithmometer). His machine featured an arithmetic unit linked to a typewriter—which could potentially be located remotely—enabling users to input commands and receive automatically printed results. Although the calculator was not programmable, it could perform all four arithmetic operations; for instance, typing instructions such as "365 × 256" followed by "=", printed "93440" and then advanced to the next line. From a user interface perspective, this machine can be regarded as a predecessor to modern computers that utilize a keyboard as an input interface. In terms of application, its design anticipated remote computing via extended electrical wires, serving as a rudimentary precursor to modern online systems that rely on communication lines. Torres had no intention of commercializing the device, viewing it instead as a vehicle to demonstrate his concepts and engineering techniques. In his accompanying paper, he also noted the necessity for automatic machines to represent continuous numerical values as finite, discrete values for processing and evaluation, an insight that directly corresponds to current digital data processing.

The electromechanical computing methods pioneered by Torres were later examined by Louis Couffignal in his 1938 doctoral thesis, Sur l'analyse mécanique. Application aux machines à calculer et aux calculs de la mécanique céleste. Referring to Torres' work, Couffignal sought to extend the possibilities of automatic calculation and advocated the use of the binary system in future electromechanical calculating machines. Between 1938 and December 1939, he secured funding and submitted proposals to the French National Centre for Scientific Research (CNRS) to build binary and ballistic electromechanical calculators, though the outbreak of World War II brought the effort to a halt, shortly before the major advances in computing that would take place during the 1940s.

=== Naval engineering ===
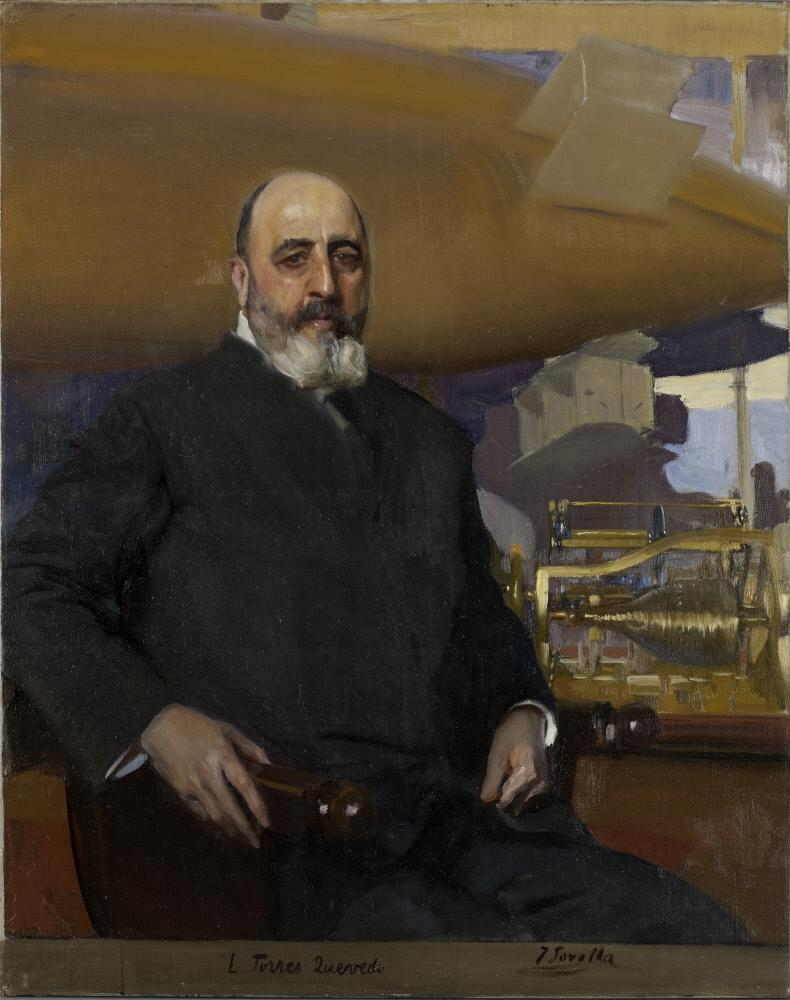
Leonardo Torres Quevedo (1917). Portrait by Joaquín Sorolla, Hispanic Society of America, New York City.

In those days when the outbreak of the Great War was anticipated, Torres designed a transport ship intended to accompany fleets. On 30 July 1913, he patented the "Buque campamento" ("Camp-Vessel"), an airship carrier featuring his innovative mooring mast technology and a hold large enough to house up to two inflated units. By integrating a stable mooring system on deck, he sought to efficiently combine aeronautics with naval operations, offering his patent to Vickers Limited—though the conglomerate showed no interest in the project. Negotiations continued, and Torres reached Admiral Reginald Bacon, who, on 17 March 1914, wrote from the Coventry Ordnance Works that "the experience of the Navy has invariably been that any auxiliary craft carried on board ship are of very little real service." In 1922, the Spanish Navy commissioned the Dédalo—the first ship to operate both captive airships and seaplanes—and similar arrangements would later appear in airship support vessels such as the American USS Patoka, incorporating concepts that Torres had proposed years earlier with his 1913 "Camp-Vessel" design.

In 1916 Torres patented in Spain a new kind of ship, a multihull steel vessel which received the name of "Binave" ("Twin Ship"). He applied for the patent of the Binave in the United Kingdom with the name "Improvements in Ships" in 1917. It was built by the Euskalduna company in Bilbao in 1918, with several test departures such as the successful round trip to Santoña on 28 September. The tests would be resumed in 1919, obtaining the certificate of implementation of the patent on 12 November of that year. The design introduces several structural features, including two 30 HP Hispano-Suiza marine engines, articulated joints intended to modify its configuration and counteract sea-induced torsion, two rudders located at the stern of each float, and aft-mounted propellers. The twin hulls were intended to accommodate machinery and tanks, while the structure above them provided space for cargo, passengers and crew. Based on the data acquired during these trials, a lower keel was added to each float in 1920 to improve stability. These design principles closely parallel modern catamarans due to its lightweight structure, the use of the twin hulls for machinery and tanks and a hull spacing close to proportions considered optimal in contemporary multihull design which became widespread from the 1990s onward.

=== Other inventions and miscellaneous activities ===
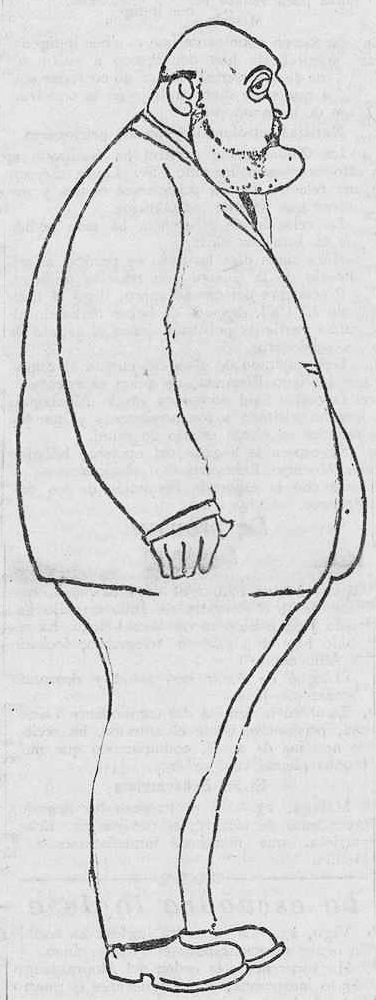
Leonardo Torres Quevedo. La Libertad newspaper cartoon, 1923

Apart from the aforementioned inventions, Torres patented the "Indicadores coordinados" ("Coordinate Indicator", 1901), a guidance system for vehicles and pedestrians using markers installed on streetlights throughout an entire city, which he proposed for Madrid and Paris under the name of "Guide Torres". He also patented the "Dianemologo" (1907), an apparatus for copying a speech as it is delivered without the need for shorthand, the "Globos fusiformes deformables" ("Deformable Fusiform Balloons", 1914), a fusiform envelope with a variable section depending on the volume of the hydrogen contained, and the "Enclavamientos T.Q." ("Interlocks T.Q.", 1918), a railway interlock of his own design to protect the movement of trains within a certain area.

In the final years of his career, Torres focused on diverse innovations, patenting improvements to typewriters (1922–23) and the marginal pagination of books (1926). He then turned his attention to the field of educational disciplines, researching elements and machines to assist educators in their tasks. His most prominent educational contributions came in 1930 with the patenting of the "Puntero Proyectable" (Projectable Pointer, 1930), and the "Proyector Didáctico" (Didactic Projector, 1930). The Projectable Pointer was based on the shadow produced on a plate or screen by a moving opaque body, which allowed the presenter to move the pointer to any place on the plate (today a slide) and operate it with an articulated system. Likewise, the Didactic Projector improved the way slides were mounted on glass plates for projection.

==== Esperantist ====
In the 1900s, Torres learned the international language Esperanto, becoming a lifelong advocate for its adoption. From 1922 to 1926, he participated in the League of Nations' International Committee on Intellectual Cooperation, whose sessions were attended by figures such as Albert Einstein, Marie Curie, Gilbert Murray, and its first president, Henri Bergson. Torres proposed that the Committee study the role of an artificial auxiliary language to facilitate scientific relations between nations. Although nearly half of the Committee members favored Esperanto, his motion faced strong opposition from President Bergson. French diplomats—who were determined to prioritize the influence of French culture—exerted pressure against the proposal, including the French ambassador in Bern, who labeled Torres a "farouchement espérantiste" ("fierce Esperantist"). In March 1925, Torres was commissioned by the Spanish government to attend the "Conference on the Use of Esperanto in Pure and Applied Sciences" held in Paris that May, alongside Vicente Inglada and Emilio Herrera Linares. That same year, he joined the Honorary Committee of the Spanish Association of Esperanto (HEA), founded by Julio Mangada, and continued defending the language in various forums until his death in 1936.

==== Hispano-American Technological Dictionary ====
In May 1910, Torres traveled to Argentina, representing the Spanish Royal Academy of Sciences as part of the official delegation accompanying the Infanta Isabel to attend the International Scientific Congress held in Buenos Aires, one of the key events organized to mark the centenary of Argentine independence. At the congress, he and the Argentine engineer Santiago Barabino proposed the creation of a Spanish-American board of scientific technology, which eventually became the Unión Internacional Hispano–Americana de Bibliografía y Tecnología Científicas. Its primary task was the publication of a technological dictionary of the Spanish language to address the challenges posed by the rapid rise of scientific and technological neologisms, as well as the adaptation of loanwords to counter the influx of foreign terms. As a result of this board's efforts, the Diccionario Tecnológico Hispanoamericano (Hispano-American Technological Dictionary) began publication in fascicles between 1926 and 1930; however, a complete edition was not released until 1983, followed by an expanded second edition in 1990.

== Recognition ==
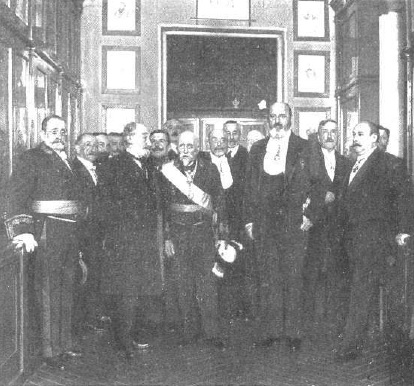
Torres receiving the Echegaray Medal at the Spanish Royal Academy of Sciences in 1916

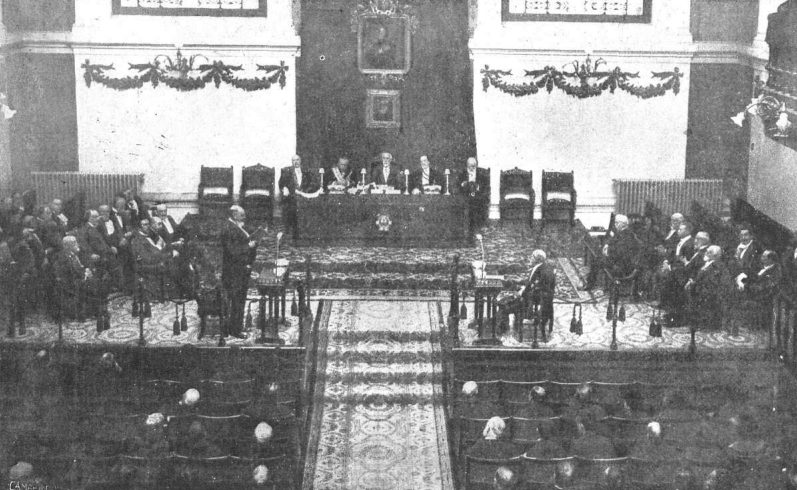
Torres' admission ceremony at the Real Academia Española. He took office with the speech titled "The project of the Hispano-American International Union of Scientific Bibliography and Technology.", 31 October 1920.

Over the years, Torres received an increasing number of decorations, prizes, and societal memberships, both Spanish and from other countries. In May 1901, he entered the Spanish Royal Academy of Sciences in Madrid for his work carried out in these years about algebraic machines, and later presided over the institution from 1928 to 1934. In 1916 King Alfonso XIII of Spain bestowed the Echegaray Medal upon him. In December 1917, he was named a Corresponding Member of the Academy of Sciences within the Faculty of Exact and Natural Sciences of the University of Buenos Aires. In 1918, he declined the offer of the position of Minister of Development. On 31 October 1920, he was admitted to the Real Academia Española, to fill the seat N vacated by the death of Benito Pérez Galdós. In his acceptance speech he said in a humble and funny way:

"You were wrong in choosing me as I do not have that minimum culture required of an academic. I will always be a stranger in your wise and learned society. I come from very remote lands. I have not cultivated literature, nor art, nor philosophy, nor even science, at least in its higher degrees… My work is much more modest. I spend my busy life solving practical mechanics problems. My laboratory is a locksmith shop, more complete, better assembled than those usually known by that name; but destined, like all, to project and build mechanisms…"

That same year, Torres served as President of the Spanish Royal Physics Society, and was elected President of the Royal Spanish Mathematical Society, a position he held until 1924. He also became a Corresponding Member of the French Academy of Sciences in the Mechanics Section, replacing the late Jules Boulvin and receiving 33 votes against the single vote obtained by Sir Alfred George Greenhill. In 1921 he was appointed President of the International Spanish-American Union of Scientific Bibliography and Technology. From 1921 to 1928 he assumed the presidency of the Spanish section of the International Committee for Weights and Measures, where due to his experience in development of instruments, contributed to the improvement of measurements made in the laboratories of the International Bureau of Weights and Measures (BIPM). In 1923 he became an Honorary Academician of the Geneva Society of Physics and Natural History. In 1925 he was promoted to Corresponding Member of the Hispanic Society of America. In 1926 he became Honorary Inspector General of the Corps of Civil Engineers. On 27 June 1927 he was named one of the twelve foreign associate academicians of the Paris Academy of Sciences, occupying the position previously held by Heike Kamerlingh Onnes. He received 36 votes out of 42 for his entry, surpassing Ernest Rutherford (4 votes) and Santiago Ramón y Cajal (2 votes).

His accolades also include:

- Grand Cross of the Civil Order of Alfonso XII (Spain, 1906)
- Parville Prize (French Academy of Sciences, 1916)
- Grand Cross of the Order of Charles III (Spain, 1921)
- Commander of the Legion of Honour (France, 1921)
- Grand Cross of the Military Order of Saint James of the Sword (Portugal, 1922)
- Honorary doctorate from the University of Paris (France, 1923)
- Honorary doctorate from the University of Coimbra (Portugal, 1925)
- Grand-Cross Band of the Order of the Spanish Republic (Spain, 1934)

== Personal life and death ==
On 16 April 1885, Torres married Luz Polanco y Navarro (1856–1954) in Portolín (Molledo). The marriage lasted 51 years and had eight children: Leonardo (c. 1886–1889), Gonzalo (1887–1965)—who also became an engineer and worked as his father's assistant—Luz (1889–1973), Valentina (b. 1891), María Luisa (1893–1981), Julia (1895–1910), Leonardo (1897–1931), and Fernando (1898–1971). Following the death of his eldest son in 1889, Torres moved with his family to Madrid to put into practice the projects he had devised in previous years. During this period, he frequented the Ateneo de Madrid and the literary gatherings (tertulias) at the Café Suizo, though he generally abstained from political debates. He joined the Casino de Madrid in 1892, remaining a member for nearly forty years. For many years, he resided at 3 Calle de Válgame Dios.

Torres was a devout Catholic who regularly read the catechism and took communion every first Friday of the month. He read the catechism as if intimately preparing himself for the peaceful end that awaited him. On one occasion, his daughter Valentina told him: "Dad, maybe you don't fully understand the mysteries that faith offers us, just as I don't understand your inventions either," to which he affectionately responded: "Oh daughter, it's just that from God to me there is an infinite distance!" Following the outbreak of the Spanish Civil War, his daughter Luz was arrested by the militia; to save her life, the family leveraged Torres's status as a Commander of the Legion of Honour, which prompted the intervention of the French Embassy. In his final moments, despite the challenges posed by religious persecution, his family managed to arrange for the last sacraments to be administered. Upon receiving the extreme unction, he uttered his final words: "Memento, homo, quia pulvis eris et in pulverem reverteris" ("Remember, man, that you are dust and to dust you will return"). On 18 December 1936, after a progressive illness, Torres died at his son Gonzalo's home in Madrid, in the midst of the Civil War and just ten days before his eighty-fourth birthday. He was initially buried in the Cementerio de la Almudena and later transferred in 1957 to the monumental Saint Isidore Cemetery.

== Legacy and tributes ==
"The learned Spanish engineer Torres Quevedo —now a foreign associate of our Academy of Sciences— who is perhaps the most prodigious inventor of our time, at least in the realm of mechanisms, has not feared to tackle in his turn Babbage's problem, but this time appealing to the resources of electromechanics, which have provided him with a theoretically complete solution [...] in the offices of the future, a central calculator will be able to respond to the request of any of the typewriters connected to it. This seems truly magical!"

— Maurice d'Ocagne, Le Figaro (May 25, 1930)

The distressing circumstances that Spain was going through during its Civil War meant that Torres' death in December 1936 went somewhat unnoticed. However, newspapers such as The New York Times reported on his demise, and French academics paid tribute to his career; Emmanuel Leclainche presented an official obituary in the Comptes rendus of the Paris Academy of Sciences, while mathematician Maurice d'Ocagne published articles in 1937–38 and delivered several lectures about his research in Paris and Brussels.

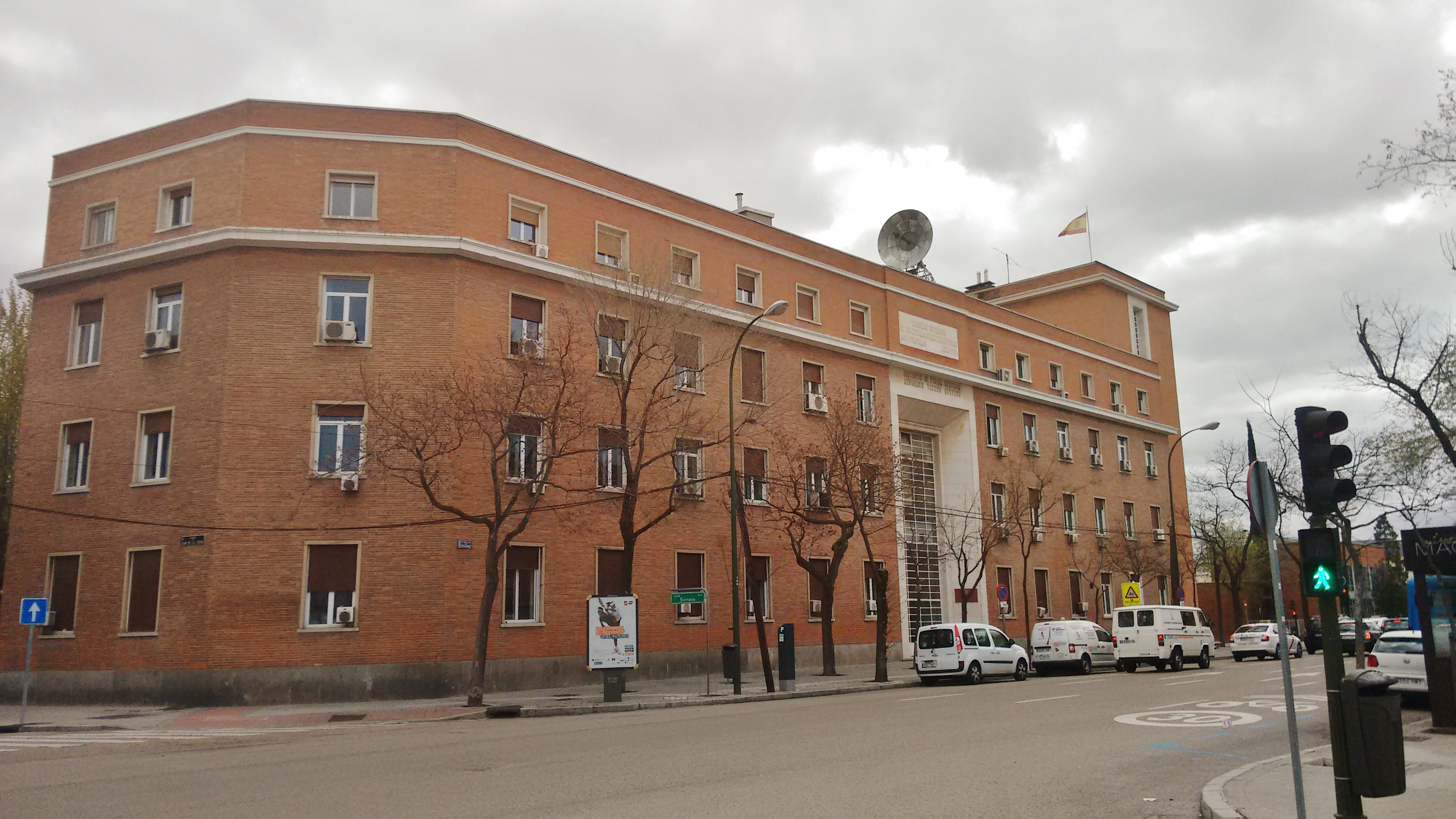
Institute of Physical and Information Technologies "Leonardo Torres Quevedo" (ITEFI), Madrid

In the years following his death, Torres was not forgotten. After the creation of the Spanish National Research Council (CSIC) in 1939, the "Leonardo Torres Quevedo" Institute of Scientific Material was established in February 1940 as part of the Patronato "Juan de la Cierva" (Juan de la Cierva Trust). Shortly after, architect Ricardo Fernández Vallespín was commissioned to design and construct a large building in Madrid to house the institute, which was constructed between 1941 and 1943. Its was dedicated to "designing and manufacturing instruments and investigating mechanical, electrical and electronic problems", serving as the origin of the current "Leonardo Torres Quevedo" Institute of Physical and Information Technologies (ITEFI).

In 1940 his name was among those selected by American philanthropist Archer Milton Huntington to be inscribed on the building of the Hispanic Society of America.

Under a law enacted on June 8, 1947, the public corporation "Torres Quevedo, S.A."—which had been established under the National Institute of Industry (INI)—was officially tasked with managing the strategic telecommunications networks and public services in the Gulf of Guinea territories.

In 1953, the commemorative events for the centenary of his birth began, taking place at the Spanish Royal Academy of Sciences with the participation of prominent academic, scientific, and university figures from both Spain and abroad, including Louis Couffignal, Charles Lambert Manneback, and Aldo Ghizzetti.

Two postage stamps were issued in Spain to honor him in 1955 and 1983, the latter featuring the image of the Niagara Aero Car, which was regarded as a work of genius.

In 1965, the City Council of Madrid dedicated a commemorative plaque at his former residence on Válgame Dios, 3, informing the public that "the scientist who brought so much glory to Spain lived in this place."

In 1978 his work was honored in Madrid at the Palacio de Cristal del Retiro during an exhibition organized by the College of Civil Engineers and led by José Antonio Fernández Ordóñez.

The Leonardo Torres Quevedo National Research Award was established in 1982 by the Spanish Ministry of Science to recognize the merits of scientists and researchers in the field of engineering. The same year, the Leonardo Torres Quevedo Foundation (FLTQ) was created as a non-profit organization to promote scientific research within the University of Cantabria and to train professionals in the area. The Foundation established its headquarters at the University of Cantabria's School of Civil Engineering.

A bronze statue on a stone pedestal was erected in 1986 to mark the fiftieth anniversary of his death. The work was commissioned to sculptor Ramón Muriedas and is located in Santa Cruz de Iguña, Torres' birthplace.

Between the late 1980s and the mid-1990s, three symposiums on his legacy were held in Spain, titled Leonardo Torres Quevedo, su vida, su tiempo, su obra, taking place in Molledo (1987), Camargo (1991), and Pozuelo de Alarcón (1995).

From 26 April to 23 September 1990, the exhibition catalogue De la Machine à Calculer de Pascal à l'Ordinateur. 350 ans d'Informatique, held at the Musée des Arts et Métiers in Paris, placed Torres' 1920 Electromechanical Arithmometer within the historical lineage leading from Babbage's Analytical Engine to modern computers. In its chronological survey of computing history, Torres was the only 20th-century inventor included before the Harvard Mark I and ENIAC.

In 1991, the Niagara Parks Commission received the Leonardo Torres Quevedo Award on the 75th anniversary of the Spanish Aerocar for its commitment to preserving Torres' design.

Commemoration of Early Developments in Remote-Control at the Technical University of Madrid. IEEE Milestone Plaque.

In June 2002, the Spanish Ministry of Science officially established the "Torres Quevedo Program" (Programa Torres Quevedo). This state-funded initiative finances the integration of PhD graduates and technologists into private companies and research centers to enhance industrial innovation.

On March 15, 2007, the Institute of Electrical and Electronics Engineers (IEEE) designated the Telekino as an IEEE Milestone in Electrical Engineering and Computing. The designation credited Torres' pioneering contribution to the development of modern remote control operations in 1901.

The centenary of the Torres Quevedo airship built in Guadalajara, which marked the beginnings of the Spanish Air Force, was commemorated by Spain's National Lottery on 19 July 2008. In November, the Leonardo Torres Quevedo Centre was established in Santa Cruz, Molledo, dedicated to his life and work.

Google celebrated his 160th birthday with a Google Doodle on 28 December 2012. The company had also commemorated the 100th anniversary of El Ajedrecista, highlighting that it was a marvel of its time and could be considered the "grandfather" of modern video games. A conference was organized on 7 November in cooperation with the School of Telecommunication Engineering of the Technical University of Madrid to exhibit Torres' devices.

Since 2015, an image of his 1907 Mount Ulia aerial ropeway has been featured on the visas pages of Spanish passports.

On 8 August 2016, the 100th Anniversary of the Whirlpool Aero Car was celebrated, marking its uninterrupted, accident-free operation. The ceremony was attended by members of the Torres Quevedo family, who traveled from Spain, alongside Carlos Gómez-Múgica, the Spanish Ambassador to Canada. According to Niagara Parks Commission Chair, Janice Thomson, "this morning's celebrations have allowed us to properly mark an important milestone in the history of the Niagara Parks Commission, all while recognizing the accomplishments and paying tribute to Leonardo Torres Quevedo, who through his work made a lasting impression on both the engineering profession and the tourism industry here in Niagara."

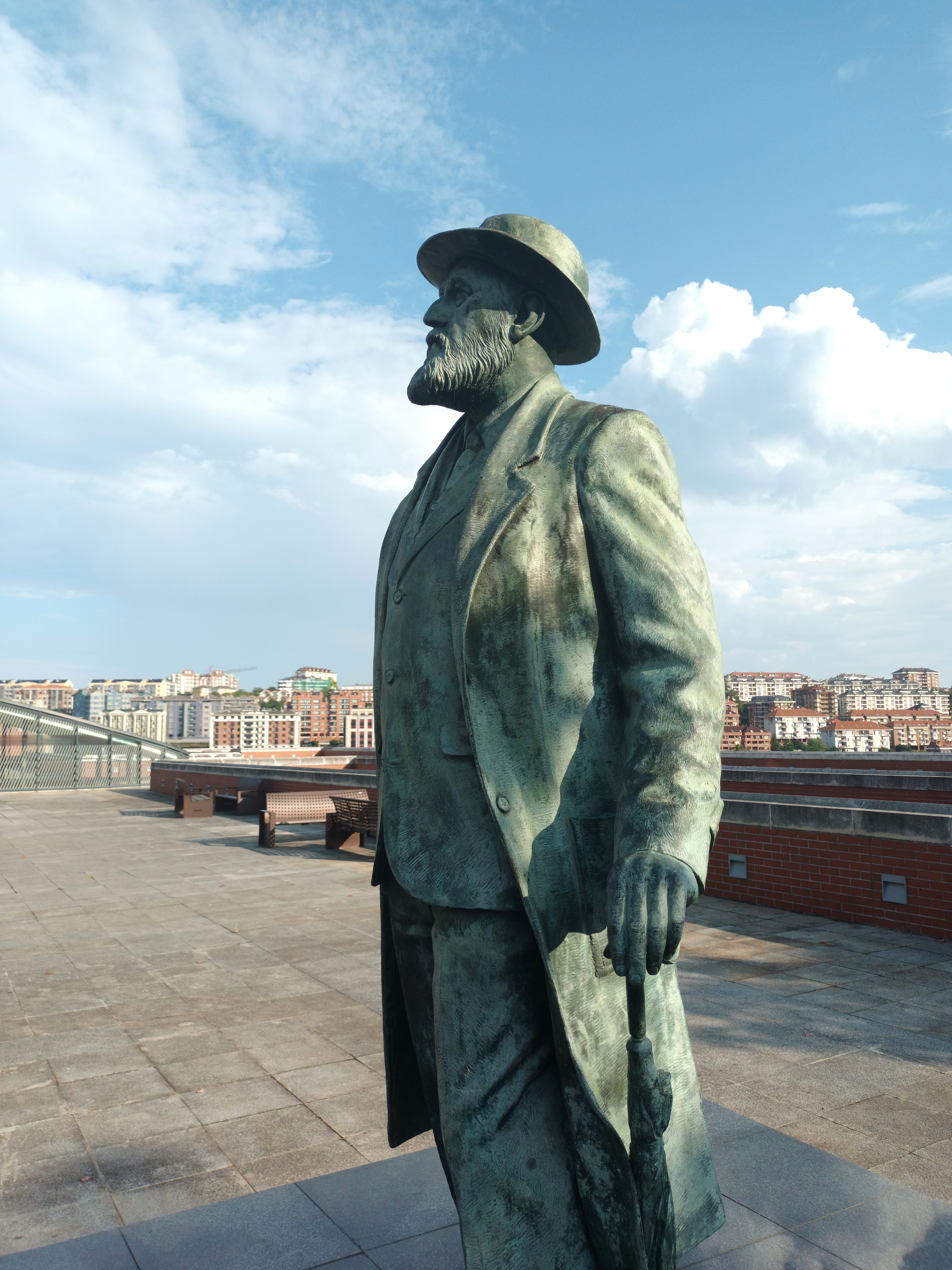
Statue of Leonardo Torres Quevedo, Plaza de la Ciencia, Santander.

In February 2022 the new turbosail of La Fura dels Baus, La Naumon, was presented in Santander. The device features a large white structure named "Leonardo Torres Quevedo" in his honor, with his figure prominently displayed at its base. Additionally, a museum called El Valle de los Inventos opened in La Serna de Iguña, offering a permanent exhibition of his inventions alongside guided tours, scientific workshops, and an escape room. On 4 July, the flag carrier Iberia received the fifth of six planned Airbus A320neo aircraft for that year; registered as EC-NTQ, it was named "Leonardo Torres Quevedo" in his honor.

On 5 May 2023, the Instituto Cervantes opened the Caja de las Letras to house the "in memoriam" legacy of Leonardo Torres Quevedo. The deposited objects included letters, manuscripts, a dozen publications (including books, monographs, and catalogs), postcards, a schedule of the Niagara Falls cable car, and the official documentation of the IEEE Milestone awarded to his Telekino invention. Torres' granddaughter, Mercedes Torres Quevedo, expressed her gratitude to the institution on behalf of his descendants, sharing their pride in his lifelong scientific and humanistic achievements. His legacy was deposited in safety deposit box number 1275, with the keys shared between his descendants and the institution.

In October 2024, the City Council of Madrid inaugurated the Beti Jai Fronton Interpretation Centre. The space offers a comprehensive overview of the fronton's historical evolution, including Torres' scientific work. The historic venue, rented by the engineer starting in 1904 as a workshop for his early aeronautical and mechanical testing, now displays historical documents and items to document his period at the complex.

== In fiction ==
In 1927, Torres made a cameo appearance as himself in the Spanish silent film La Malcasada, directed by Francisco Gómez Hidalgo, a melodrama set in Spanish high society, which featured, among others: Francisco Franco, Juan Belmonte, Concha Espina, Pedro Muñoz Seca, Ramón del Valle-Inclán, Wenceslao Fernández Flórez, José Martínez Ruiz, Manuel Machado, Margarita Nelken, Santiago Rusiñol, Miguel Fleta, Miguel Primo de Rivera, Álvaro de Figueroa, 1st Count of Romanones, and Juan de la Cierva.

He was also portrayed as one of the main characters in the novel Los horrores del escalpelo (The Horrors of the Scalpel, 2011), written by Daniel Mares. The plot tells how the Spanish engineer travels to London in 1888 to find Maelzel's Chess Player, a mechanical automaton that was believed to have been lost for decades. Together with Raimundo Aguirre, a thief and murderer, who claims to have the clue to the lost automaton, he begins the search through the London underworld and Victorian high society. The search is interrupted due to the streets of the Whitechapel neighborhood dawn with corpses of prostitutes, which causes Torres and his partner Aguirre to become involved in the hunt for Jack the Ripper.

== Selected works ==
- "Nouveau systeme de chemin funiculaire aérien, a fils multiples", Exposé d'invention. Confédération Suisse (1889)
- "Sur les machines algébriques", Association française pour l'avancement des sciences (1895)
- "Machines à calculer", Mémoires présentés par divers savants à l'Académie des Sciences de l'Institut National de France (1901)
- "Un Avant-Projet de Ballon Dirigeable", L'Aérophile (1902)
- "Sur le télékine", Comptes rendus de l'Académie des Sciences (1903)
- "Sobre un sistema de notaciones y símbolos destinados a facilitar la descripción de las máquinas", Revista de Obras Públicas (1907)
- "Ensayos sobre Automática. Su definición. Extensión teórica de sus aplicaciones", Revista de la Real Academia de Ciencias Exactas, Físicas y Naturales (1914)
- "Arithmomètre Electroméchanique", Bulletin de la Société d'encouragement pour l'industrie nationale (1920)

== See also ==
- Science and technology in Spain
- List of Spanish inventions and discoveries
- List of IEEE Milestones
- List of pioneers in computer science
- List of Esperanto speakers
- Timeline of artificial intelligence
- Timeline of computing hardware before 1950
- Timeline of electrical and electronic engineering
- Aerial tramway
- Unmanned aerial vehicle
- Unmanned ground vehicle
- Airship
- Coastal class airship
- NS class airship
- Société Astra
- Balloon carrier
- Analytical Engine
- Computer
- History of computer science
- History of computing
- History of computing hardware
- History of artificial intelligence
- History of chess engines
- History of robots
- Robot
- Turing machine
- Glossary of chess
- Computer chess
- Chess in Spain
- Mechanical Turk
- Mechanical computer
