= Federico Saiz =

Spanish footballer

Fede
Personal information
- Full name: Domingo Germán Saiz Villegas
- Date of birth: 8 June 1912
- Place of birth: Molledo, Cantabria, Spain
- Date of death: 24 April 1989 (aged 76)
- Place of death: Cantabria, Spain
- Height: 1.70 m (5 ft 7 in)
- Position: Forward

Senior career*
Years	Team	Apps	(Gls)
1930–1932	Alavés	32	(0)
1932	Real Sociedad	0	(0)
1932–1936	Sevilla	60	(1)
1939	Alavés	0	(0)
1939–1941	Sevilla	31	(0)

International career
1934	Spain	3	(0)
- * Club domestic league appearances and goals

Domingo Germán Saiz Villegas (8 June 1912 – 24 April 1989), nicknamed Fede, was a Spanish footballer. The nickname origin was the name of a brother who died before he was born.

Born in Molledo, Cantabria, during his club career he played for Deportivo Alavés and Sevilla FC, with a spell at each before the Spanish Civil War began, and another after it ended (he signed for Real Sociedad in 1932 but never made an official appearance for them).

He earned three caps for the Spain national football team in 1934, and took part in the 1934 FIFA World Cup; he played in the 1–1 draw with hosts and eventual champions Italy, but not in the replay in which Spain were eliminated.

== Honours ==
Sevilla

- Segunda División: 1933–34
- Copa del Rey: 1935
