= Maritxu Guller =

Basque fortune teller

Maritxu (María) Erlantz Guller (Note: Sometimes spelled "Guler" when translated into Spanish, especially in her published work.) (1912–1993), also known as the "sorgin ona" or "white witch of Ulia", was a Spanish teacher, tarot reader and fortune teller who supposedly had paranormal powers.

== Life ==
Maritxu was born in 1912 in Isaba, Navarre. She studied to become a teacher in Pamplona and subsequently worked as a teacher in Irañeta during the Spanish Civil War. On 8 October 1938 she married a Swiss man named Giovanni Guller, who encouraged her to deepen her studies in parapsychology. The couple moved to San Sebastián in 1952 and settled in a baserri in Mount Ulia.

Maritxu created various Tarot decks which were published by Fournier including El Gran Tarot Esoterico in 1976 (with illustrations by Luis Pena Longa) along with its instruction manual. Designed by Maritxu and illustrated by Luis Pena Longa, the deck features classic Tarot motifs as well as variations inspired by the system of French astrologer and tarot reader Eudes Picard, first outlined in his 1901 work. The deck was republished in 2016 by Lo Scarabeo and distributed by Llewellyn Worldwide. Martitxu also created two Basque themed decks; the Euskal Tarot Mitika or Basque Mythical Tarot in 1982 (with illustrations by Angel Elvira which were inspired by Basque mythology) and the Tarot de Euskal Herria in 1991 (with illustrations by Alfredo Fermín Cemillán "Mintxo"), which she dedicated "to all women, to help them interpret the Tarot wisely."

In addition to her Tarot decks, Maritxu created over 36,000 grimoires for divination.

She died in 1993 in San Sebastián. A children's park is named after her in San Sebastián, where she lived for many years.
