= Santa Cruz, Molledo =

Town in the municipality of Molledo in Cantabria, Spain

Coordinates: 43°09′57″N 4°02′30″W

Santa Cruz is a town in the municipality of Molledo in Cantabria, Spain. It is 1.5 kilometers from the municipal capital, Molledo. Santa Cruz is 208 meters above sea level. Its population in 2008 was 188 inhabitants, which are divided between Santa Cruz and the neighborhood of Murá. This town is also known by the name of Santa Cruz de Iguña. It is notable for being the birthplace of Leonardo Torres Quevedo, a mathematician and inventor.
