= Beti Jai fronton =

Historic sports venue in Madrid, Spain

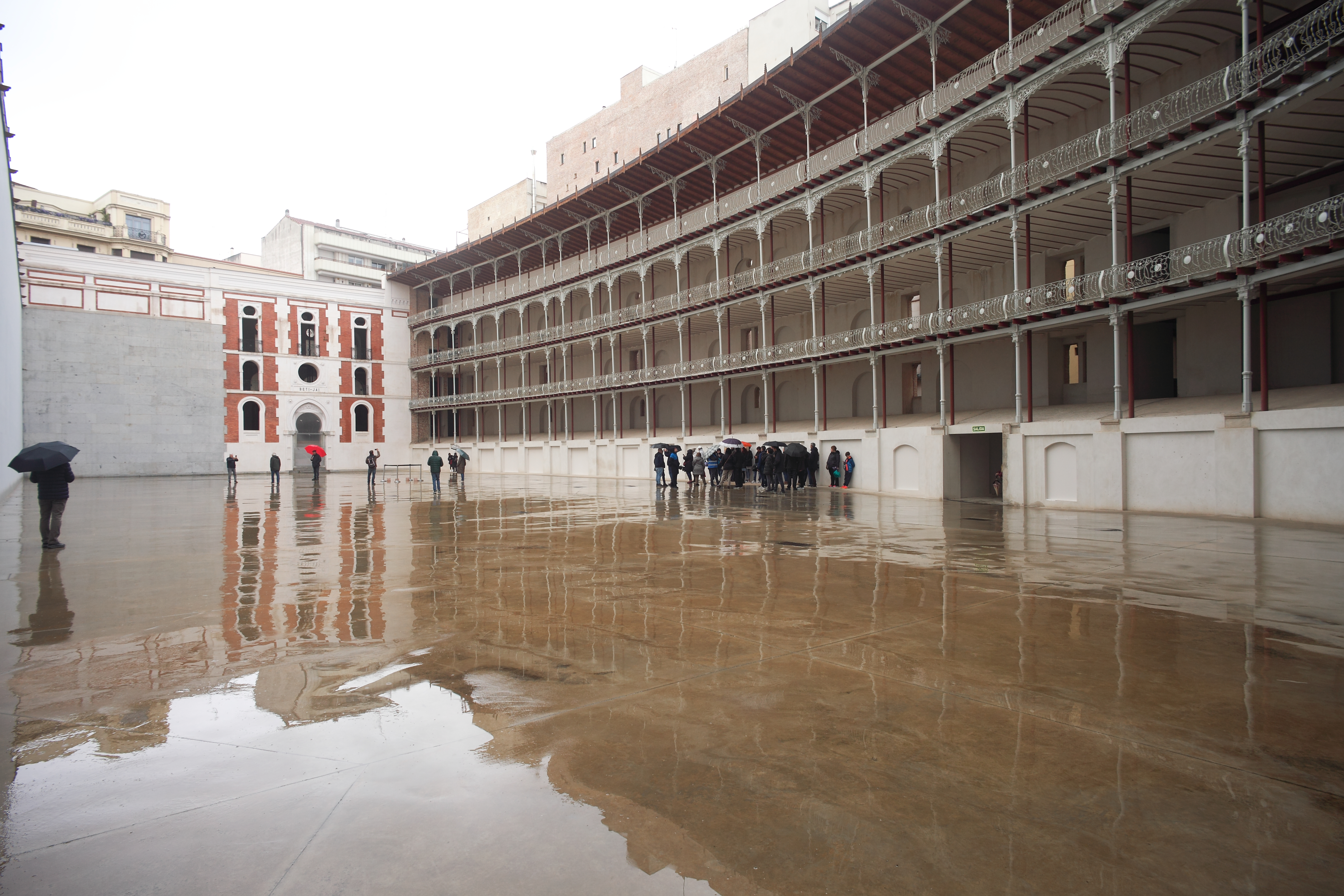
- In 2024

- Location within Spain
- 40.431°N 3.69112°W
- Location: Madrid, Spain

Spanish Cultural Heritage
- Official name: Frontón Beti Jai
- Type: Non-movable
- Criteria: Monument
- Designated: 27 January 2011

The Beti Jai fronton is a sport venue located in Madrid, Spain.

Located at Calle del Marqués de Riscal 7, the building (in Neo-Mudéjar style) dates from 1893 and it was opened in 1894. The last game was played in the fronton in 1919, after which it was used for several purposes. The venue is the last surviving 19th-century Basque pelota fronton in Madrid. It was declared bien de interés cultural on 27 January 2011., and it was fully renovated in 2019.

== History ==
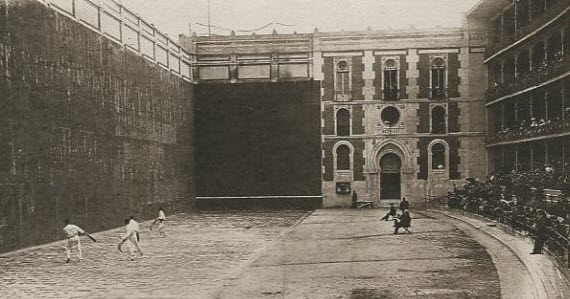
Beti Jai fronton, engraving from the 19th c.

The fronton was begun to be built in 1893, with a budget of approximately 500 000 pesetas. It is due to a design by architect Joaquín Rucoba (1844–1919), author of the Plaza de toros de La Malagueta, the Mercado de Atarazanas and park in Málaga, and the City Hall of Bilbao, among other works. It was the fourth infrastructure of these open features in Madrid at the end of the 19th century, in a time when the sport of Basque pelota reached a remarkable popularity in the Spanish capital. It was preceded, in this order, the frontons Jai Alai (1891), Fiesta Alegre and Euskal Jai.

It was opened on 29 April 1894 (other sources indicate 29 May that year) and it was in operation until 1919. Leonardo Torres Quevedo used it between 1904 and 1906 as a center for the development of his automatic devices. With the Civil War during Siege of Madrid its facilities were converted into a police station, and during the early years of Francoist Spain, it served as a test site for musical bands linked to the Spanish Falange. In the middle of the 20th century, it was sold to the auto company Citroën, who used it as a repair shop.

In 1997 it was bought for 2.3 million euros by the Basque company Jai Alai Fronton, initially intended its recovery for sport use. Subsequently, the property was taken over by the company Aguirene.

On 27 January 2011 it was declared Bien de Interés Cultural by the Community of Madrid.

In 2010 the City Council of Madrid began a process of expropriation, completed in 2015, and paying for it the amount of 7 million euros and started an extensive restoration, which was completed in 2019.

== Description ==
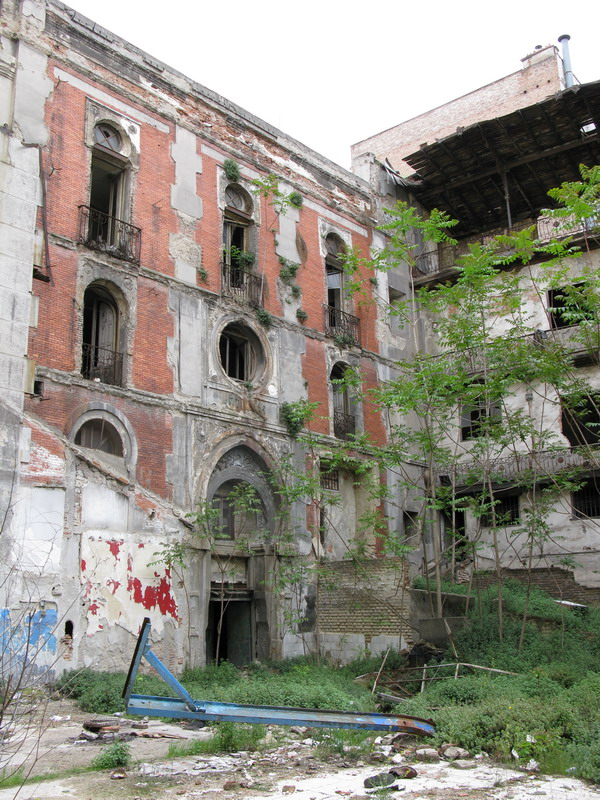
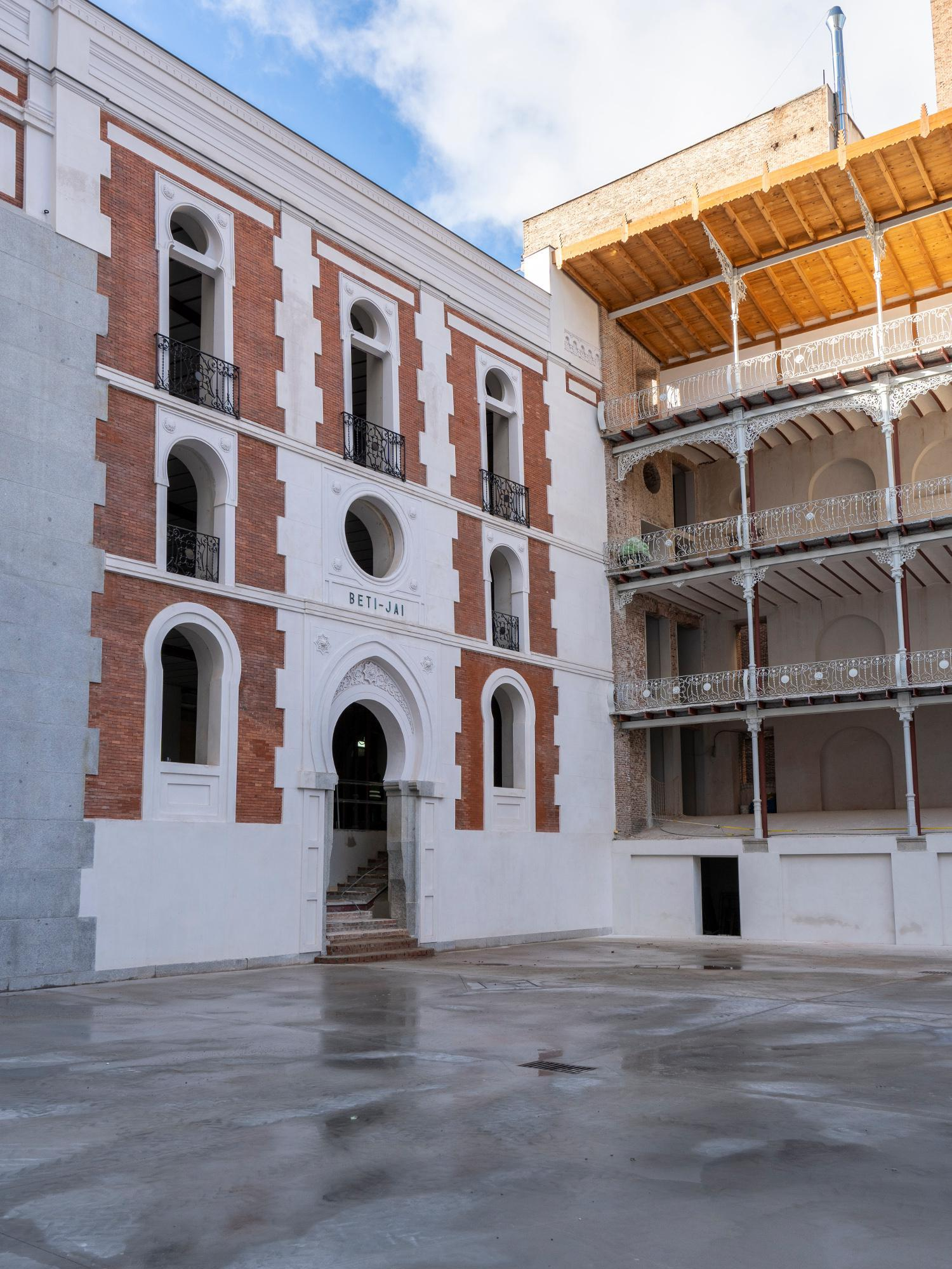
Detail of the Neo-Mudéjar interior facade of the Beti Jai Fronton. Before (left) and after (right) the 2019 refurbishment.

The Beti Jai Fronton is located at number 7 of the Calle del Marqués de Riscal, very nearby of the Paseo de la Castellana, in the Madrilenian district of Chamberí. It occupies a plot of 3609 m^{2} and the built area reaches 10 800m². It is made in different styles, including most notably the Eclectic of the main facade, the Neo-Mudéjar present in some parts of the interior and the Cast-iron architecture characteristic of the 19th century.

Its core comprises an outdoors field, 67 m long, 20 m wide and 11 m high. Around the same it extend the stands, that around the track in its eastern and southern sides, drawing a plant semi-elliptical.

The grandstand has a capacity for 4000 people and is divided into four floors, closed at the inside by balconies with railings interconnected via stairs of wood. It is supported by a network of columns and beams of wrought iron, some of them curved to give inclination to the stands, and has wooden deck. On the roofs are preserved remains of frescoes.

On the western side rises a Neo-Mudéjar curved wall.

== Homonyms frontones ==
There have been other frontones also called Beti Jai in Barcelona, San Sebastián and Logroño. the San Sebastianan was subsequently the Teatro Circo and disappeared when a fire occurred in 1913.
