= Vicente Inglada =

Spanish military, seismologist and geophysicist

Vicente Inglada Ors
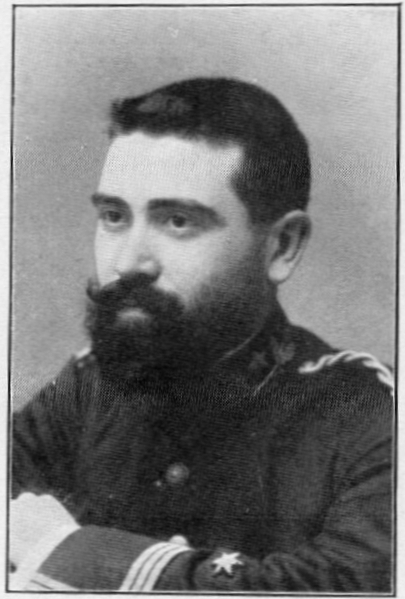
- Vicente Inglada Ors
- Born: 9 January 1879; Alicante, Spain
- Died: January 9, 1949 (aged 70); Madrid, Spain
- Known for: formulas for the calculation of the hypocenter in earthquakes
- Scientific career
- Fields: Seismologist; Geophysicist
- Institutions: Spanish Army; Geophysical Observatory of Toledo; National Institute of Geophysics; War Higher School of Spain

Vicente Inglada Ors (Alicante, January 9, 1879 – Madrid, January 7, 1949) was a Spanish military officer, geophysicist, and seismologist.

== Biography ==
Vicente Inglada was born in Alicante in 1879. He completed his primary and secondary education in the same city, finishing his high school studies at the General and Technical Institute in 1893. In 1896 he began his military career by entering the Toledo Infantry Academy, obtaining the rank of infantry lieutenant in 1897. In 1898 he was appointed a student at the Higher War School, where he completed his studies in 1902. That same year he married Isabel García-Serrano Abela, with whom he had five children. After serving in several military units, in 1905 he was promoted to captain in the General Staff Corps. In 1906 he took part in the preparation of the cartography of the island of Menorca.

In 1907, he requested a temporal leave from the army and began working for the Geographic and Statistical Institute. In 1911, he obtained the position of director of the Central Seismological Station of Toledo, where he reviewed the instruments and substantially improved the Wiechert seismograph that was installed there.

In 1919, he investigated the damages caused by the earthquake of September 10, 1919, in the Bajo Segura area (Alicante). Recognizing the importance of calculating the position of the hypocenter, he developed new formulas to determine it from the arrival times of seismic waves, simplifying the system of Radó von Kövesligethy. Inglada deduced that isosysts were the intersection of the seismic waves (coming from the focus) with Earth's surface and that the depth of the hypocenter was directly proportional to the difference of the radii of two consecutive isosists.

He translated into Spanish the third edition of Alfred Wegener’s work Die Entstehung der Kontinente und Ozeane (La génesis de los continentes y océanos). This translation was published in the Biblioteca de la Revista de Occidente collection in 1924, the same year the first translations into French and English appeared. He also translated into Spanish the lectures on seismometry by Boris Golitsyn.

In 1923, he began teaching “Mathematical Algorithms, Astronomy, Geodesy, and Meteorology” at the Superior War School, a position he held until 1928. In 1924, he represented his country as an official delegate at the International Assembly of the Geodetic and Geophysical Union in Prague. He was a member of the organizing committee of the 14th International Geological Congress, held in Madrid in 1926, and in 1928 he was named a member of the Spanish Royal Academy of Exact, Physical and Natural Sciences.

In 1931, he formally retired from the military to focus on his scientific work at the Geographic Institute, where he worked in the Geodesy Service and eventually became head of the Seismology section at the Geophysics Laboratory. During the Civil War, he was dismissed from his post, but was reinstated following the victory of the Franco's forces. When the National Institute of Geophysics was founded in 1941, he was appointed deputy director and later led the Pure Geophysics section. In 1942, the Institute launched the Revista de Geofísica. a quarterly publication that continued until 1979, when the institute itself was dissolved.

Vicente Inglada was a well-known Esperantist. In 1905, together with Antonio López Villanueva, he published an Esperanto-Spanish and Spanish-Esperanto vocabulary, which went through several editions, as well as an exercise manual. Between 1903 and 1930, he was the main editor of the Esperantist magazine La Suno Hispana, published in Valencia. In 1925, he attended, representing Spain, the International Esperanto Conference in Paris, focused on its use in pure and applied sciences. He translated eighteen plays by Jacinto Benavente from Spanish into Esperanto, as well as some works by Leandro Fernández de Moratín and Santiago Rusiñol. From Esperanto into Spanish, he translated Esperanto verkaro (Fundamento de Esperanto) by L. L. Zamenhof, published in Paris in 1905.He was also interested also in other languages. In addition to Spanish and Catalan, which were his native languages, he spoke English, French and German fluently, and had enough knowledge of Portuguese, Italian, Basque, Latín and Ancien Greek to understand texts in those languages.

== Main publications ==
- (1921). Nuevas fórmulas para abreviar el cálculo de la profundidad aproximada del foco sísmico por el método de Kövesligethy, y su aplicación an algunos temblores de tierra. Talleres del Instituto Geográfico y Estadístico, Madrid, Spain.
- (1923). La corteza terrestre. Talleres del Instituto Geográfico y Estadístico, Madrid, Spain.
- (1923). as observacioes gravimétricas. Talleres del Instituto Geográfico y Estadístico, Madrid, Spain.
- (1926). El Sismo del Bajo Segura de 10 de septiembre de 1919. Cálculo de las coordenadas del foco, basado en la hora inicial de los sismogramas registrados en varias estaciones próximas. Talleres del Instituto Geográfico y Estadístico, Madrid, Spain.
- (1926). Cálculo de las coordenadas del foco sísmico y del instante inicial de la sacudida por medio de las horas del principio de los sismogramas registrados en varias estaciones próximas. Revista de la Real Academia de Ciencias Exactas, Físicas y Naturales de Madrid, 22, 523–592.
