= Mount Ulia =

Ridge near San Sebastián, Spain

Coordinates: 43°19′51″N 1°57′36″W

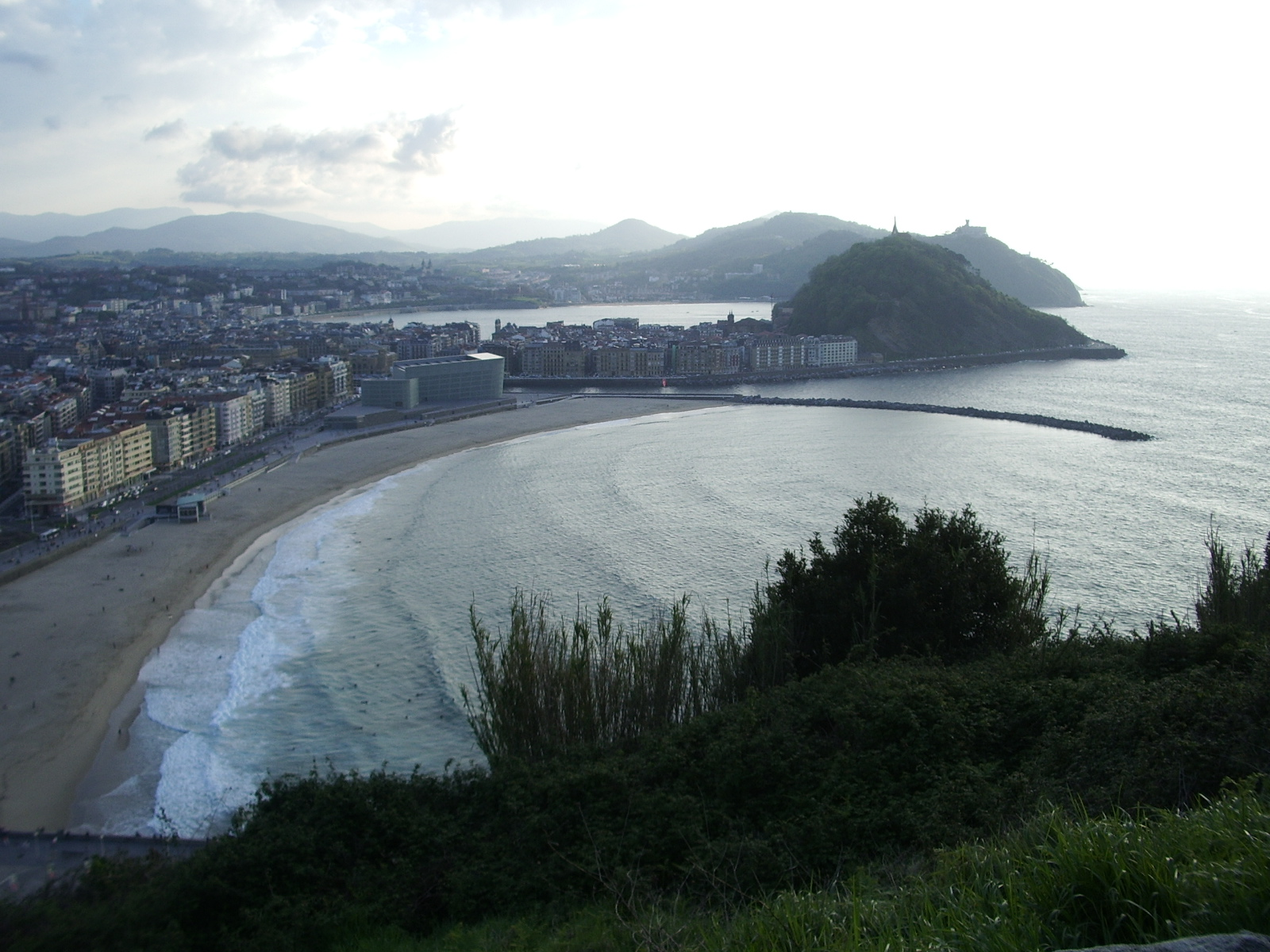
San Sebastián viewed from Ulia

Mount Ulia is a minor ridge located east of San Sebastián in the Basque Country, territory of Spain, reaching 243 m at its highest point. The ridge stretching out to the east along the coastline sinks in the strait leading to the bay of Pasaia. The chain overlooks San Sebastián to the west, with the Zurriola beach and the district of Gros lying right at the foot. This privileged location turned Mount Ulia into a significant leisure and romantic area in the early 20th century, a condition in which it has remained until now, despite the pressure of urban development.

Ulia was recorded as Mirall (a Gascon name and term) in 1530 after the whale observation point or rock still to be seen at the top of the ridge, while it was called Uliamendi as it approached the Zurriola inlet. The rock was used to watch out for migratory whales passing off the Basque coast before they became extinct in this area, with the watchers notifying the whalers from San Sebastián of their presence by means of a bonfire.

Later, the westernmost tip of the ridge standing out onto the sea, Monpas, took on a strategic value for a short period after 1898 and became a stronghold with hidden corridors, military facilities and batteries, ready for an attack from the ocean.

The Park of Nurseries of Ulia is at the beginning of the road going to Mount Ulia from San Sebastián. It is so named since the nurseries situated inside the park were the provider of plants for the public gardens of San Sebastián during all the 20th century and until 2008. The park is of great value because it includes two ancient water-tanks, because of its architectonic elements, and because of its flora and fauna.

From 1907 to 1917, Ulia became the site of the Mount Ulia aerial ropeway designed by Leonardo Torres Quevedo, based on his 1887 multi-wire system patent. Considered a landmark in the development of safe public aerial transport, it preceded the large-scale expansion of passenger aerial tramways in the Alps during the following years.
