= Molledo =

- Municipality
- Flag Coat of arms

- Location of Molledo

- Location in Spain
- Coordinates: 43°9′15″N 4°2′27″W
- Country: Spain
- Autonomous community: Cantabria
- Province: Cantabria
- Comarca: Besaya
- Judicial district: Torrelavega
- Capital: Molledo

Government
  - Alcalde: Dámaso Tezanos Díaz

Area
  - Total: 71.07 km^{2} (27.44 sq mi)
- Elevation: 241 m (791 ft)

Population (2025-01-01)
  - Total: 1,482
  - Density: 20.85/km^{2} (54.01/sq mi)
- Time zone: UTC+1 (CET)
  - Summer (DST): UTC+2 (CEST)

Molledo is a municipality located in the autonomous community of Cantabria, Spain.

== Localities ==
- Cobejo, 20 hab.
- Helguera, 122 hab.
- Molledo (Capital), 425 hab.
- San Martín de Quevedo, 236 hab.
- Santa Cruz, 188 hab.
- Santa Olalla, 159 hab.
- Silió, 620 hab.
