= List of airship accidents =

The following is a partial list of airship accidents. It includes both rigid airships and blimps, which operated differently from one another. Not included on this list are airships shot down or otherwise lost to military action.

Date	Incident	Deaths	Injured
16 July 1889	The Campbell Airship crashed off Long Island, killing pilot Edward D. Hogan.	1	0
12 June 1897	Deutschland fell over Tempelhof Field in Berlin killing Friedrich Hermann Wölfert and his mechanic Robert Knabe.	2	0
12 May 1902	Semi-rigid airship Pax explodes over Paris, killing Augusto Severo and Georges Saché.	2	0
13 October 1902	While over Paris, the gondola separates from the Bradsky's envelope, killing Baron Ottokar de Bradsky and his engineer Paul Morin.	2	0
30 November 1907	French Army airship Patrie breaks loose from its mooring during a storm and is blown over the English Channel; after sightings in Wales and Ireland and a brief touchdown in Belfast, the airship was blown out over the Atlantic Ocean and is never seen again.	0	0
23 May 1908	Morrell airship fell over Berkeley, California. All 16 on board survive, but some with serious injuries.	0	16
5 August 1908	Zeppelin LZ 4 catches fire near Echterdingen after it broke loose from mooring and was blown into some trees.	0	0
25 September 1909	French Army's La République crashes near Avrilly, Allier killing four.	4	0
25 April 1910	Zeppelin LZ 5 (Z II) breaks in two at Limburg an der Lahn after it breaks loose from mooring in a storm.	0	0
28 June 1910	Zeppelin LZ 7 Deutschland crashes in the Teutoburg Forest after flying into a thunderstorm.	0	0
13 July 1910	Airship Erbslöh explodes over Rhenish Prussia killing all five.	5	0
14 September 1910	Zeppelin LZ 6 (Z III) burns in its hangar at Oos, Baden-Baden.	0	0
15 October 1910	American non-rigid airship America disappears without a trace off Nova Scotia after being abandoned by its crew.	0	0
23 February 1911	The Yamada-style No. 2 airship (Japanese: 山田式２号, romanized: Yamada-shiki 2-gō) developed by Yamada Isaburo was destroyed by strong winds while moored for repairs.	0	0
4 May 1911	British Army's Morning Post is blown off course during descent. It crashed into trees and houses before bursting and seriously burning a French mechanic.	0	1
16 May 1911	Zeppelin LZ 8 Deutschland II is caught by a wind gust while being walked out of its hangar and damaged beyond repair after it smashes on the roof of the hangar.	0	0
24 September 1911	HMA No. 1, more commonly known as the Mayfly, is the first rigid airship to be built in the UK. It broke in two due to strong winds while being removed from its shed in Barrow-in-Furness for ground trials.	0	0
28 June 1912	Zeppelin LZ 10 Schwaben burns at Düsseldorf after it breaks loose in strong winds while being put into its shed.	0	30–40
2 July 1912	Privately owned Goodyear-built airship Akron explodes on a transatlantic attempt off Atlantic City, New Jersey, killing all five, including its owner, Melvin Vaniman.	5	0
4 September 1912	Near Budapest, Hungary, a military airship was being prepared for an ascent and was being held down by more than 100 soldiers, a heavy wind prevails and a sudden gust carries the airship away. It rises rapidly and all but three of the men release their grip on the rope. Those three hold on until exhaustion weakens their grip, causing them to fall to their deaths one by one.	3	0
9 September 1913	Imperial German Navy L 1 (Zeppelin LZ 14) crashes in a storm north of Heligoland. 14 drowned, 6 survivors. First fatal Zeppelin accident.	14	6
17 October 1913	Imperial German Navy L 2 (Zeppelin LZ 18) explodes in mid-air and crashes during a test flight. All 28 on board killed.	28	0
20 June 1914	Austro-Hungarian Army k.u.k Militärluftschiff M.III (Körting) collides with an army Farman HF.20 over Fischamend. All seven on airship die along with the two in the biplane.	9	0
13 October 1914	Imperial Russian non-rigid airship Albatross crashes during a forced landing.	0	0
10 February 1915	Imperial Russian semi-rigid airship Giant, Russia's largest airship, bends in two and crashes near Gatchina during flight tests.	0	0
3 September 1915	Imperial German Navy L 10 (Zeppelin LZ 40) is destroyed by fire on 3 September 1915 after being struck by lightning near Cuxhaven, killing 19 crew members.	19	0
1 October 1915	Zeppelin LZ 11 Viktoria Luise breaks apart while being put in its hangar.	0	0
10 November 1915	Imperial German Navy D.1 (Schütte-Lanz type SL6) explodes after take-off over Luftschiffhafen Seddin, killing all 20 on-board.	20	0
17 November 1915	Imperial German Navy L 18 (Zeppelin LZ 52) burns out in shed fire at Tønder.	0	0
1 February 1916	Imperial German Navy L 19 (Zeppelin LZ 54) comes down in the North Sea, off the coast of the Netherlands, after an air-raid on the United Kingdom. All 16 crew survive the crash, but subsequently perish after the crew of a British fishing boat refuse to rescue them.	16	0
21 February 1916	In an experiment to launch a Royal Aircraft Factory B.E.2C fighter from under a SS-class non-rigid airship, Neville Usborne and another British officer are killed.	2	0
3 May 1916	Imperial German Navy L 20 (Zeppelin LZ 59) force-lands off Norway due to low fuel. Six crew jump overboard, leaving eight still on board. Relieved of weight, the airship rises and is blown northwest before its anchor catches a rock on a mountain. The shock of the sudden stop is so great that one of the gondolas falls off into the water, killing three. The airship rises again and continues flying until it slowly falls into the water off Jåsund and breaks in two. The remaining four crew jump before the airship hits the water. On 4 May the wreck is intentionally shot at by Norwegian soldiers and explodes.	3	
12 May 1916	French airship CM-T-1 burns near Porto Torres, Sardinia while en route to Fréjus/St. Raphaël, France.		
16 September 1916	Imperial German Navy L 6 (Zeppelin LZ 31) burns during inflation in hangar at Fuhlsbüttel and is destroyed along with L 9 (Zeppelin LZ 36).	0	0
7 November 1916	Imperial German Army LZ 90 (Zeppelin LZ 60) disappears without a trace after breaking loose in a storm and blown out to sea.	0	0
28 December 1916	Imperial German Navy L 24 (Zeppelin LZ 69) crashes into a wall while being taken into its hangar at Tondern and burns out, along with L 17 (Zeppelin LZ 53).	0	0
20 October 1917	Imperial German Navy L 45 (Zeppelin LZ85) performs a forced landing near Sisteron, France, due to fuel exhaustion; all 17 crew were taken captive after the commander set the airship on fire.	0	0
20 October 1917	Imperial German Navy L 50 (Zeppelin LZ 89) performs a forced landing near Dammartin-sur-Meuse, France due to fuel exhaustion; the control car is torn off in the crash, but the ship drifts over the Mediterranean with five crew on board where it apparently explodes. Remaining 16 crew taken captive as POWs.	5	0
12 December 1917	"North Sea"-class blimp N.S. 5 sets off for RNAS East Fortune, but both engines fail within sight of her destination and she drifts with the wind for about 10 mi (16 km) before they could be restarted. However, since both engines continue to be troublesome it is decided to make a "free balloon" landing; the airship is damaged beyond repair during the attempt.	0	0
13-14 December 1917	Coastal class airship C.26 of the British Royal Naval Air Service was searching for C.27 which had run into difficulties off the British coast. During the search, the rear engine fails for unknown reasons and the airship begins to drift towards the Netherlands. Ballast and equipment were thrown overboard to maintain altitude over water. Three crew jump overboard when the airship gets stuck, but this reduced the weight and the airship took off again and the final crew member lets go and falls into a ditch near Sliedrecht. Unmanned and out of control, C.26 gets stuck again, later breaks loose and crashes onto a bakery in Eemnes. Crew arrested and interned in Groningen until the end of the war.	0	1
5 January 1918	Ahlhorn hangars explode, destroying the LZ 87 (L 47), LZ 94 (L 46), LZ 97 (L 51), LZ 105 (L 58), and SL 20. Fifteen killed, 134 injured.	15	134
7 April 1918	Imperial German Navy L 59 (Zeppelin LZ 104) explodes over Malta for reasons unknown, killing all 21 crew.	21	0
14 May 1919	United States Navy blimp C-5 A-4122 is blown out to sea over the Atlantic after it breaks loose from its moorings in a storm.	0	0
2 July 1919	United States Navy blimp C-8 explodes while landing at Camp Holabird, Maryland, injuring ~80 adults and children who were watching it. Windows in homes a mile away are shattered by the blast.		~80
15 July 1919	Royal Navy North Sea class airship N.S. 11 burns over the North Sea off Norfolk, England, killing twelve. In the early hours of 15 July on what was officially supposed to be a mine-hunting patrol, she was seen to fly beneath a long "greasy black cloud" off Cley next the Sea, on the Norfolk coast, and a massive explosion was heard shortly after. A vivid glare lasted for a few minutes as the burning airship descended, and finally plunged into the sea after a second explosion. There were no survivors, and the findings of the official Court of Enquiry were inconclusive, but amongst other possibilities it was thought that a lightning strike may have caused the explosion.	12	0
21 July 1919	American airship Wingfoot Air Express catches fire over downtown Chicago, 2 passengers, one crewmember and 10 people on the ground die while 2 parachute to safety.	13	28
19 June 1920	United States Navy Goodyear airship D-1, A-4450, burns at the Goodyear Wingfoot Lake Airship Base, Suffield Township, Portage County, Ohio.		
6 February 1921	Soviet military airship Krasnaya Zvezda (ex-French Astra-Torres AT-13) crashes after encountering strong winds.		
7 July 1921	United States Navy airship C-3 burns in mid-air at Naval Air Station Hampton Roads, Norfolk, Virginia		
23 August 1921	British R38, built for U.S. Navy and already carrying "ZR-2" markings, breaks in half and catches fire after suffering structural failure during high-speed trials over Hull. 44 die, 5 survivors.	44	
31 August 1921	U.S. Navy airship D-6, A-5972, burns in its NAS Rockaway hangar, along with airships C-10 and H-1, and the kite balloon A-P.		
21 February 1922	U.S. Army airship Roma (ex-Italian T34) hits power lines in Virginia and burns out following rudder failure, killing 34 of 45 on board.	34	8
17 October 1922	U.S. Army's largest blimp, C-2 (A-4119), catches fire shortly after being removed from its hangar at Brooks Field, San Antonio, Texas for a flight. Seven of eight crew aboard are injured, mostly in jumping from the craft. This accident was made the occasion for official announcement by the Army and the Navy that the use of hydrogen would be abandoned "as speedily as possible". From 14 September to 23 September 1922, the C-2 had made the first transcontinental airship flight, from Langley Field, Virginia, to Arcadia, California, under the command of Maj. H. A. Strauss.	0	7
21 December 1923	French Navy's Dixmude (ex Zeppelin LZ 114) explodes in mid-air over the Mediterranean near Sicily following an apparent lightning strike. All 52 on board killed.	52	0
10 October 1924	U.S. Army blimp TC-2 explodes over Newport News when a bomb it was carrying detonates. Two of the crew of five were killed.	2	
3 September 1925	U.S. Navy USS Shenandoah (ZR 1) is caught in a storm over Noble County, Ohio and breaks apart into several pieces. 14 killed, 29 survivors.	14	
25 August 1927	USS Los Angeles is flipped vertically at the Lakehurst mast. Damage is minor, the photograph becomes famous.	0	0
25 May 1928	Italian semi-rigid Italia crashes on return from successful trip to North Pole. 7 killed, 1 crash survivor dies from exposure; 8 rescued, 6 rescuers lost, including Roald Amundsen.	8	
31 August 1928	Soviet Moscow Rubber Chemist (Russian: Московский химик-резинщик, romanized: Moskovsky Khimik-rezinshchik) suffers damage while flying over the Tver region and is written off. The gondola is salvaged and used for the SSSR-V4 Komsomolskaya Pravda.	0	0
5 October 1930	British experimental design R101 nosedives into the ground during rainstorm in France and burns out. 48 killed, 6 survivors. The crash, the deadliest involving a civilian airship, ended development of British airships.	48	
11 May 1932	During an abortive landing, the USS Akron floats upward at Camp Kearny, California with four members of the mooring crew; one let go at 15 feet and suffered a broken arm, two fell to their deaths, the fourth was able to hold on to his line and was pulled aboard the airship an hour later.	2	1
4 April 1933	USS Akron crashes at sea off the coast of New Jersey in severe storm. With 73 dead - many drowned - and 3 survivors, this remains the deadliest airship accident.	73	3
4 April 1933	United States Navy airship J-3 A-7382 crashes at sea off New Jersey coast with two crew killed while looking for USS Akron survivors.	2	
16 August 1934	Soviet SSSR-V7 Chelyushinets burns in its hangar at Dolgoprudny along with SSSR-V4 Komsomolskaya Pravda and SSSR-V5 after lightning strikes the hangar.		
12 February 1935	USS Macon crashes off coast at Point Sur, south of Monterey, California, after crosswinds break an already-damaged section. 2 dead, 81 survivors.	2	
24 October 1935	Soviet semi-rigid airship SSSR-V7bis hits power lines near the Finnish border and catches fire; one crew member dies while the rest manage to escape.	1	
6 May 1937	German LZ 129 Hindenburg catches fire while landing at NAES Lakehurst, New Jersey. 35 dead, plus one killed on ground, 62 survivors.	36	
6 February 1938	Soviet SSSR-V6 Osoaviakhim crashes into a mountain some 300 km south of Murmansk while on a practice flight for an arctic rescue mission. 13 killed, 6 survivors. The crash deals a severe blow to the Soviet airship program, and it is eventually terminated in 1940.	13	3
6 August 1938	Soviet USSR-B10 is ordered to leave its parking spot at Dolgoprudny to make room for USSR-B8 arriving for scheduled hydrogen replacement and USSR-B10 is hurriedly sent on a flight. The day was sunny and hot; hydrogen in the envelope heated up and expanded. The gas valves, which were supposed to release the excess gas, do not work and the envelope ruptures at 250 m (820 ft). The airship rapidly loses altitude; shutting off the engines and jettisoning ballast does nothing to stop the descent and the airship crashes, killing all seven crew.	7	0
8 June 1942	U.S. Navy blimps G-1 and L-2 collide in mid-air, killing twelve, including five civilian scientists.	12	0
16 August 1942	Designated Flight 101. The two experienced crew of the U.S. Navy blimp L-8 disappear without explanation during the flight, giving it the name "The Ghost Blimp". The blimp drifts inland from its Pacific patrol route, striking the ground and leaving its depth charge armament on the beach. It then lifts off and drifts further inland and crashes on a downtown street in Daly City, California. The gondola door had been latched open, and the safety bar, which was normally used to block the doorway, was no longer in place. Two of the three life jackets on board were missing, but these would have been worn by the two crew during flight, as regulations required. A year after their disappearance the pilots were officially declared dead.	2	0
19 April 1944	U.S. Navy airship K-133, of Airship Patrol Squadron 22 (ZP-22), operating out of NAS Houma, Louisiana, crashes in the Gulf of Mexico after flying into a thunderstorm while on a patrol mission, 12 of 13 crew die; the sole survivor is recovered after spending 21 hours in the water.	12	1
21 April 1944	The southeast door of blimp hangar at NAS Houma, Louisiana, is chained open due to a fault. A gust of wind carries three K-class blimps (all of ZP-22) out into the night. K-56 travels 4.5 miles before it crashes into trees. K-57 caught fire 4 miles from the air station. K-62 is blown into high-tension power lines a quarter-mile away and burns. K-56 is salvaged, repaired at Goodyear at Akron, Ohio, and returned to service.		
16 May 1944	Training accident at Lakehurst, New Jersey kills ten of eleven crewmen of K-5 as it crashed into the number one hangar.	10	
2 July 1944	U.S. Navy blimp K-14 crashes off Maine, killing six of the ten crewmen. Her loss has been attributed to accident or machine gun fire from a U-boat.	6	4
7 July 1944	U.S. Navy blimp K-53 crashes into the Caribbean, killing one of her crew of ten.	1	
17 October 1944	U.S. Navy blimp K-111 crashes on Santa Catalina Island, California, killing seven of her ten crewmen.	7	
5 November 1944	U.S. Navy blimp K-34 crashes off the coast of the State of Georgia, killing two of eleven crewmen.	2	
3 May 1945	A Navy blimp's fuel tanks explode over Santa Ana, California killing eight of the crew of nine.	8	
29 January 1947	While flying at low altitude, Soviet airship Pobeda hits power lines. The wires wrap around the propellers, jamming them. Ballast is dropped, but the airship rises so rapidly that the relief valves cannot keep up. Eventually the envelope ruptures and the airship crashes, killing the three crew.	3	0
1947	Soviet airship SSSR-V12 is blown onto a gate and burns while flying into the boathouse at Dolgoprudny. Some metal structures are used in the construction of SSSR-V12bis Patriot.	0	0
14 May 1959	U.S. Navy ZPG-2 crashes into hangar roof during a dense fog at Lakehurst, New Jersey killing one and injuring 17.	1	17
6 July 1960	U.S. Navy N-class blimp ZPG-3W crashes into the sea off New Jersey. 18 of the 21 crew were killed.	18	
8 October 1980	The 170 foot Jordache EA-1 blimp, N5499A, leased by Jordache Enterprises Co., crashes at Naval Air Engineering Station Lakehurst, New Jersey on its maiden flight. Launched at 085 h and with a flight plan to Teterboro Airport and thence to a Manhattan photo shoot, the airship, weighed down with gold and burgundy paint, reached 600 feet altitude before beginning an unplanned right descending turn, with pilot James Buza, 40, making a "controlled descent" into a garbage dump, impaling the blimp on a pine tree, coming down just a quarter-mile from the site of the Hindenburg's 1937 demise. Buza, the only crewmember, was unhurt. According to the NTSB report, the cause was poor design. The pilot also had zero hours experience in the type.	0	0
1 July 1986	The experimental Piasecki PA-97 Helistat, re-using the envelope of a retired U.S. Navy ZPG-2W N-class blimp, crashed at Naval Air Engineering Station Lakehurst in Lakehurst, New Jersey, during a test flight, killing a test pilot and injuring another three.	1	3
30 September 1990	Goodyear GZ-20, tail number N10A, suffers an intentional mid-air collision with a radio-controlled airplane.	0	0
4 July 1993	U.S. LTA 138 S airship Bigfoot, which bore the Pizza Hut logo, crashed on top of buildings in Manhattan. The cause included inadequate FAA standards according to the NTSB report.	0	2
23 May 1994	WDL-1B airship was attempting to land in Giessen, Germany, when it is lifted by a sudden wind gust. Ten of the ground crew attempt to hold it down, but eight let go of the ropes. The remaining two fell to their deaths.	2	0
11 September 1994	An Airship International blimp bearing the Gulf Oil logo crashes on a house at Farmingdale, Long Island, having lost gas pressure. It was on its way to cover the U.S. Open tennis championship. There were no injuries, but power was lost in the neighborhood.	0	0
May 1995	The Goodyear Blimp type GZ-20 "Eagle", tail number N10A, suffers a deflationary incident when the blimp struck the ground near its Carson, California, mooring site, while unmanned. No injuries were reported. This blimp was repaired and re-registered with tail number N2A.	0	0
1 July 1998	Icarus Aircraft Inc. / American Blimp Corporation ABC-A-60, tail number N760AB, encounters a severe downdraft on positioning flight from Williamsport, Pennsylvania to Youngstown, Ohio, and is substantially damaged when it hits trees at 1105 h during uncontrolled descent ~eight miles (~13 km) NW of Piper Memorial, near Lock Haven, Pennsylvania. After being blown from treetop to treetop for about ten minutes, gondola settles in a tree about 40 feet (12 m) in the air and the two pilots exited uninjured and climbed down the tree. Some fifteen minutes later the airship was blown another 900 feet (275 m) before coming to rest.	0	0
28 October 1999	The Goodyear Blimp type GZ-22 "Spirit of Akron", tail number N4A, crashes in Suffield Township, Portage County, Ohio, when it suddenly enters an uncontrolled left turn and begins descending. The pilot and technician on board receive only minor injuries when the blimp impacts with trees. The NTSB reported the probable cause as being improperly hardened metal splines on the control actuators shearing and causing loss of control.	0	1
16 June 2005	The Goodyear Blimp type GZ-20 "Stars and Stripes", tail number N1A, crashes shortly after takeoff in Coral Springs, Florida. No one was injured. Bad weather may have been a factor in the incident.	0	0
26 September 2006	The Hood blimp, an American Blimp Corporation A-60, crashes into a wooded area of Manchester-by-the-Sea, Massachusetts. The airship left Beverly Municipal Airport at about 12:15 hrs. Shortly after, the pilot starts to have problems and he tries to land on Singing Beach, but instead gets caught in some trees near Brookwood Road. The pilot was not injured.	0	0
12 June 2011	A Goodyear Blimp operated by The Lightship Group in Reichelsheim (Wetterau), Germany catches fire and crashes, resulting in the death of Australian, Michael Nerandzic, an experienced pilot whose last-minute action saved the lives of his three passengers.	1	
14 August 2011	The Hangar-1 blimp operated by The Lightship Group breaks free of its mooring in Worthington, Ohio, and crash lands in a yard. No injuries.	0	0
4 May 2012	An Israeli spy blimp crashes when a crop duster strikes the blimp's side.		
28 October 2015	An experimental United States military defense airship becomes untethered in Maryland, and drifts 100 miles north before crashing in Anthony Township, Pennsylvania.		
24 August 2016	The Hybrid Air Vehicles HAV 304 Airlander 10 suffers cockpit damage, but no injuries, and drags a mooring rope through power lines near the airfield, as a result of an anomalously steep approach and landing on its second test flight at Cardington Airfield in Bedfordshire, England.		
15 June 2017	A thermal airship crashes near Erin Hills in Erin, Wisconsin after some of its fabric envelopes tear away mid-flight. Advertising PedFed Credit Union, the airship was flying by the 2017 U.S. Open golf championship when it began deflating rapidly. The pilot suffered from compressed vertebrae in his lower back and third degree burns on his neck, arms, a thigh, and 75% of his back.	0	1
25 September 2024	An Airship do Brasil ADB-3-3 crashed over building in Osasco, Brazil, while performing an advertisement flight for the football club São Paulo FC. The airship was substantially damaged and the 2 occupants on board were injured.	0	2

== See also ==
- List of ballooning accidents
