= 2011 Lightship Europe airship crash =

Airship crash in Germany

2011 Lightship Europe airship disaster
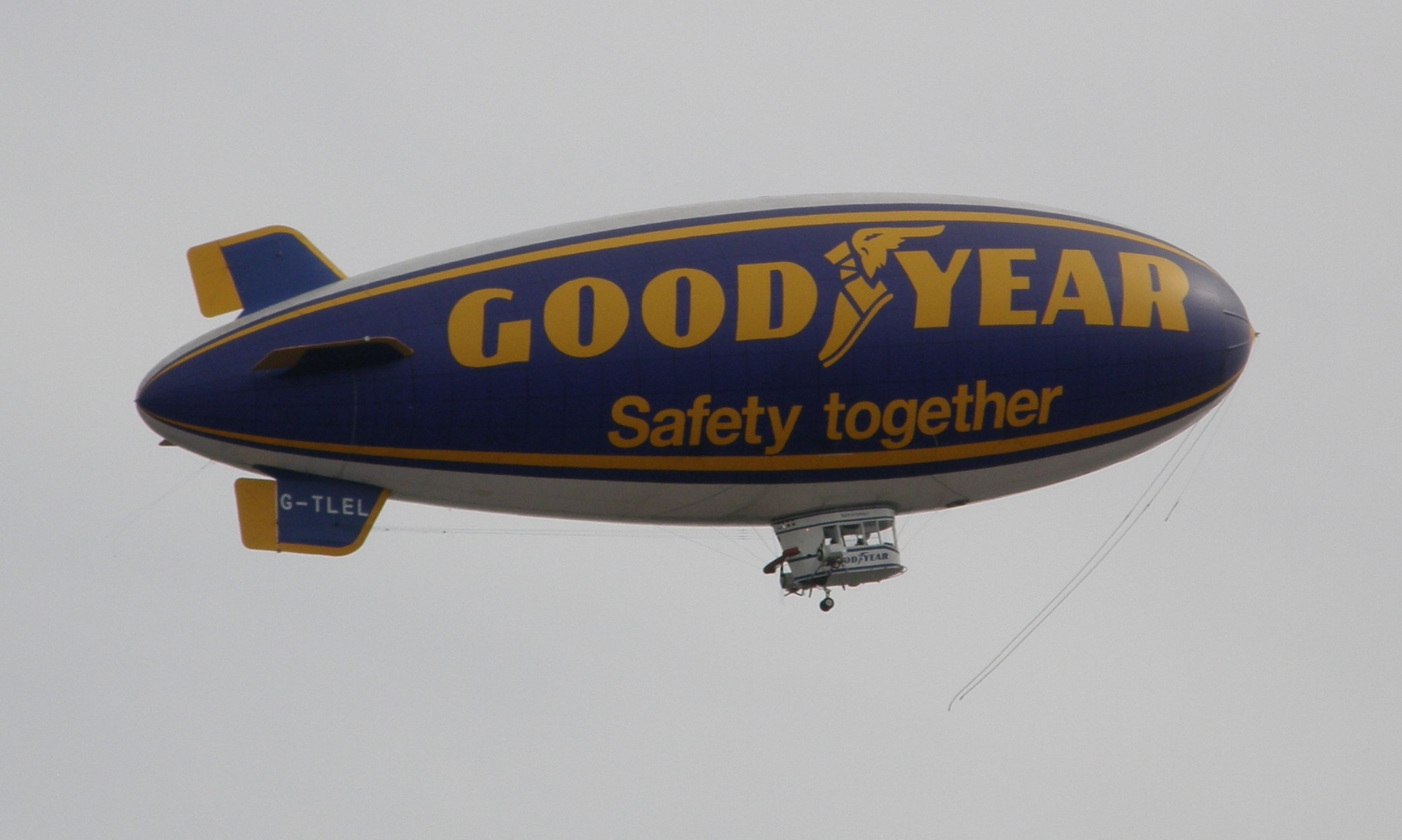
- G-TLEL, the airship involved in the accident, seen the day of the accident

Accident
- Date: 12 June 2011
- Summary: Caught fire after fuel leak caused by a broken gear and overloading
- Site: Near Reichelsheim, Hesse, Germany

Aircraft
- Aircraft type: American Blimp A-60+
- Aircraft name: Spirit Of Safety I
- Operator: Lightship Europe Ltd.
- Registration: G-TLEL
- Flight origin: Oberursel, Hesse, Germany
- Destination: Reichelsheim, Hesse, Germany
- Occupants: 4
- Passengers: 3
- Crew: 1
- Fatalities: 1
- Survivors: 3

On June 12, 2011, an American Blimp A-60+, operated by Lightship Europe, caught fire during landing at Reichelsheim. The initial impact during the landing procedure damaged the blimp's landing gear which started a fuel leak that eventually lead to a fire. The blimp was on an advertisement flight with passengers. Out of the 4 occupants on board, the pilot died.

== Background ==
=== Aircraft ===
The airship involved was an American Blimp A-60+ that had the Goodyear logo written on it. The registration of the aircraft was G-TLEL, and although operating in Germany, the airship had a United Kingdom registration. It was manufactured in 1991 and powered by two Limbach L2000 EC1 engines.

=== Passengers and crew ===
The pilot was 52 years old Australian Micheal Nerandzic, he had 12,330 flight hours on blimps. The passengers were all reporters. The blimp was on an advertisement flight with passengers to promote a festival in the city of Oberursel.

== Accident ==
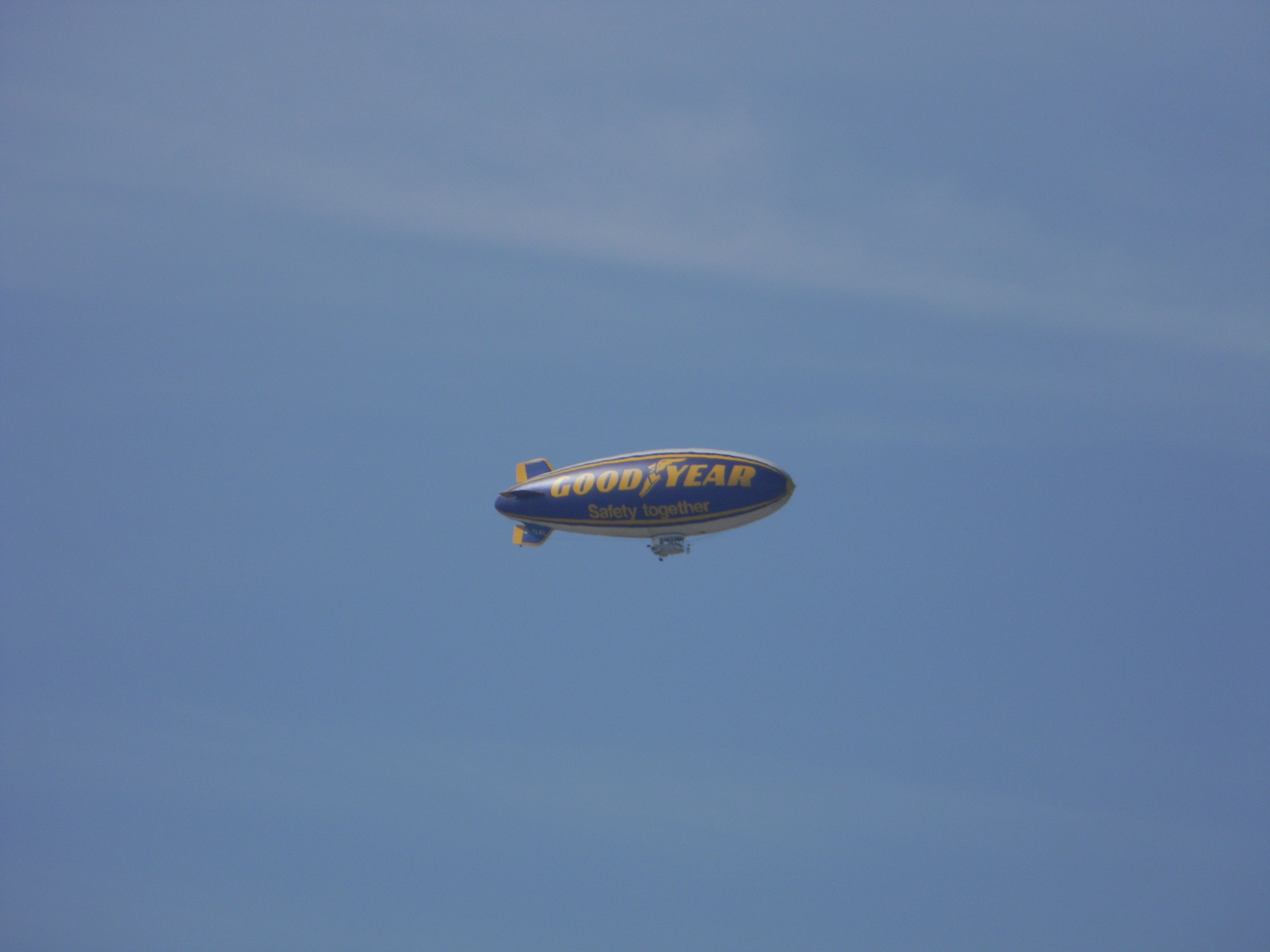
The airship involved while flying over the United Kingdom

At 8:30 am local time the airship began preparation for the flight, and the gas started being pumped inside it. At 9:30 am the load sheet was redacted, the aircraft had a weight of nearly 1,400 kg. At 6:08 pm the airship took off for the eighth flight of the day, on board that flight were pilot Nerandzic (who was the second pilot to fly the airship that day) and the three passengers. The flight plan was to fly over Bad Homburg, to allow the journalists to take photos of the preparation for a concert. After two hours of flight the pilot contacted the Reichelsheim airfield to report his position in preparation for landing; at that time he was 5 nautical miles south-west of the airfield. During the approach the passengers observed that the aircraft was descending quickly, and at 8:15 pm the airship impacted the ground about 470 m away from the landing spot. After the impact the occupants started to smell fuel on board and heat was perceived inside the gondola, this eventually led to a fire, that started to develop in the aft part of the cabin. The ground crew reported smoke coming from the cabin, and soon after the three passengers disembarked and the airship started to climb again. The aircraft reached 100 m of height, and the fire spread throughout the rest of the cabin and the envelope. At 8:20 pm the airship crashed about 400 m away from the touchdown point. The final report concluded that the landing gear moved so far back that the steel cable ruptured. As a result, the airship slid on the ground for a few meters and, during that movement, the broken gear ruptured a valve causing the fuel leak.

== Final report ==
The final report concluded that the crash was caused by pilot error, and that the wind conditions at the landing airport and the erroneous loading of the airship were contributing factors.

== Aftermath ==
The day after the crash Lightship Europe issued a statement sending condolences to the family of the dead pilot. The company also suspended the operations with their second airship until further notice. In 2014 the pilot was posthumously assigned a Star of Courage by Australia for saving the passengers. The final report on the accident was published by the German Federal Bureau of Aircraft Accident Investigation.

== See also ==
- Wingfoot Air Express crash
- List of airship accidents
