= The Campbell Airship =

1888 semi-rigid airship

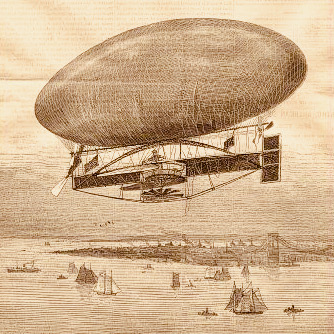
- The Campbell Airship

General information
- Type: Private airship
- National origin: United States
- Manufacturer: Novelty Airship Company
- Designer: Peter Campbell
- Status: Lost
- Number built: 1

History
- First flight: 8 December 1888
- Last flight: 16 July 1889

The Campbell Airship was an unsuccessful airship designed by Peter Carmount Campbell, with the assistance of other American aeronauts like Carl Myers and James K. Allen. After an initial test flight in December 1888, the Campbell Airship crashed at sea on a trial flight on 16 July 1889, killing the pilot, Canadian aeronaut Edward D. Hogan (1852–1889).

Car of the Campbell Airship

Peter Campbell was a jeweler in Brooklyn, New York and aeronautical enthusiast who had discussed his concept with others like Horace Greeley and Samuel Morse before beginning construction in 1888. Campbell hoped to eventually produce his airship for $1,500 a piece and use them to handle passenger traffic in large cities.

== Design ==
The design was a semi-rigid airship, using a metal rod for an external keel. The envelope was 60 feet long and 42 feet wide, for a total of 18,000 cubic feet. The balloon was made of Japanese silk. The ship was propelled by a hand crank and propeller, with a second propeller beneath the car for vertical control. The rudder, which gave the airship steering, was constructed of a light fabric stretched over a reed frame. Hinged wings on both sides gave it control. Campbell held a US patent, number US-1887-362605 for his airship.

== Initial trial ==
By December 1888, Campbell and his team had prepared the airship for an initial test flight. Campbell employed James K. Allen, the eldest son of American balloonist James Allen, to pilot the craft. After waiting for good weather, Allen ascended on 8 December 1888 in front of a few hundred people on Coney Island.

In a 28 December 1888 edition of the Chicago Tribune, aviation pioneer Octave Chanute published an anonymous analysis of Campbell's initial effort. Chanute noted that while Campbell may have made notable progress in designing improved steering methods, the ship did not have enough lift capacity to carry a large enough motor. Chanute estimated that the airship could not manage more than 6-8 miles per hour for 1-2 hours of flight.

== Failed flight ==
After breaking for the winter, Campbell attempted a second flight, having enlisted Hogan to pilot the airship. Hogan was an experienced balloonist with over 200 ascensions. The first attempt occurred on 19 Jun 1889 in front of about 500 people at the Manhattan Athletic Club. The attempt was called off after several hours, as the gas-generating tanks leaked and failed to fill the bag.

A second attempt was made on 16 July 1889. At 10 o’clock Hogan took off on a flight from Brooklyn. Hundreds of New Yorkers came to see the flight. When the command was given to release the holding ropes, the airship was discovered to be too light for the gas in the balloon, and the airship quickly ascended to 1,000 feet. Professor E. D. Hogan started the engine to control the flight, but the eight-foot-long propeller under the airship broke off and crashed to the ground. The mechanical failure and now loss of control caused the wind to blow the airship out to sea. The airship went out over the Atlantic Ocean, south of Long Island.

== Aftermath ==
Following the disappearance of Hogan and the airship, a muddied situation emerged in the news. Three days after the launch, the pilot boat Caprice returned to port, and the pilot related seeing what he believed to be the airship on the water, but was unable to find the car. Professor Hogan's body was never found, although various rumors and variations on the story cropped up in the papers. Campbell conveyed to the New York Tribune that he had been opposed to Hogan taking the ship up in its current state, essentially blaming Hogan's haste for the results. The New York Evening World ran an article stating that the car of the airship flown had been one of Hogan's own design and not Campbell's, and also noted unconfirmed rumors that Hogan had landed on Long Island and was still alive. Despite these rumors, Hogan never turned up and was presumed dead.

In late 1889, there were reports in Buffalo area newspapers that Campbell planned to build a second airship and fly it in the area. Based on a published illustration, at least the car of this design was different from the design Hogan flew. The flight was postponed twice, and ultimately failed in front of 8,000 people on the Parade House grounds in Buffalo. A similar attempt on 28 June 1891 in Columbus, Ohio was also largely unsuccessful, traveling only a mile. A similar attempt a month later in Fort Wayne, Indiana reportedly ended with Campbell disappearing with the entrance fees.

== See also ==
Related lists

- List of airship accidents
- List of missing aircraft
