= Great Industrial Exposition of Berlin =

1896 exposition in Berlin, Germany

1896 Berlin
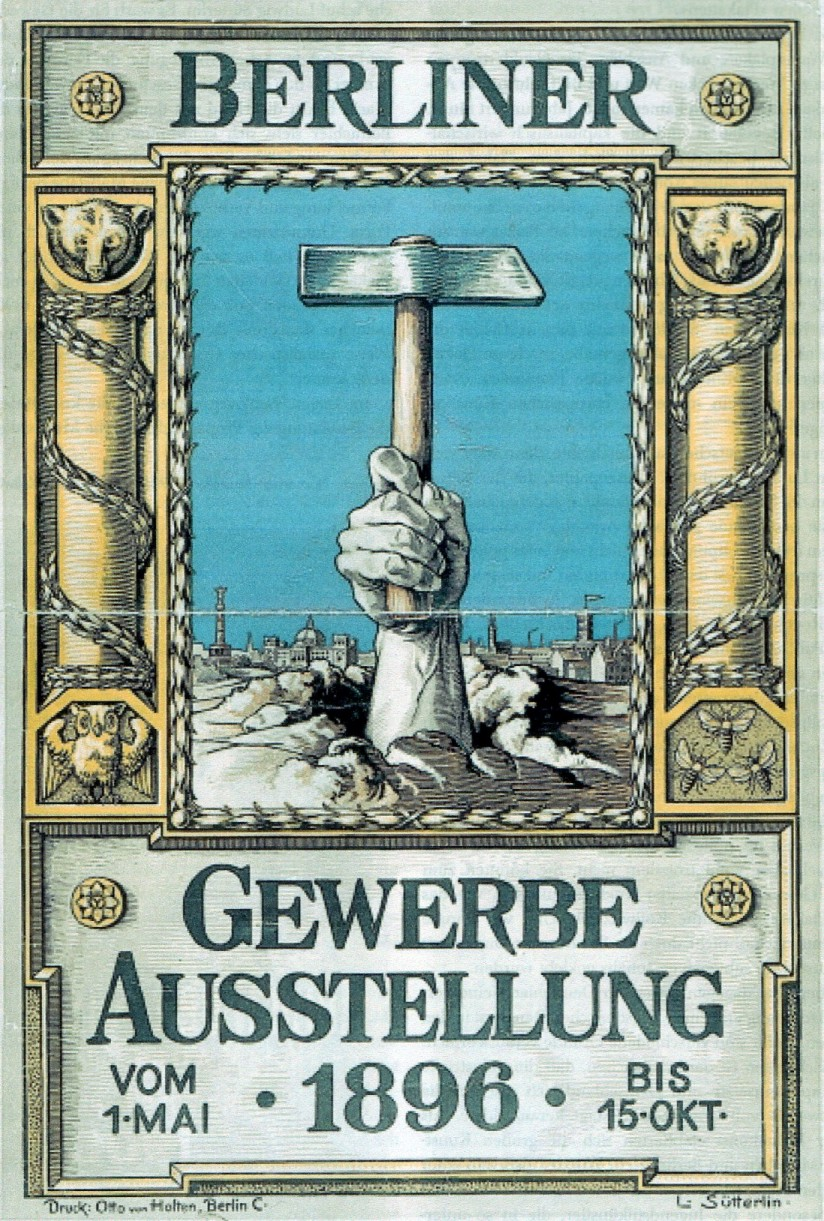

Overview
- BIE-class: Unrecognized exposition
- Name: Berliner Gewerbe Ausstellung
- Building(s): Archenhold Observatory
- Invention(s): X-ray
- Visitors: 7,000,000

Participant(s)
- Business: 3,780

Location
- Country: Germany
- City: Berlin
- Venue: Treptower Park
- Coordinates: 52°29′25″N 13°28′12″E

Timeline
- Opening: 1 May 1896
- Closure: 15 October 1896

expositions
- Previous: World's Columbian Exposition in Chicago
- Next: Brussels International (1897) in Brussels

The Great Industrial Exposition of Berlin 1896 (German: Große Berliner Gewerbeausstellung 1896) was a large exposition that has also been dubbed "the impeded world fair (Die verhinderte Weltausstellung)".

Under the official name of a Berlin Industrial Exposition (German "Berliner Gewerbeausstellung") - borrowing the name from earlier exhibitions - the Universal Exposition of Berlin took place between 1 May and 15 October 1896 in the Treptow borough of Berlin.

The exposition featured one of the largest and longest Great refractors up-to that time, and it was preserved after the exposition and survived to the 21st century.

== Precursors ==
The first Berlin Industrial Exposition was initiated by the Prussian Minister Christian Peter Wilhelm Beuth. The trade fair took place from 1 September to 15 October 1822, as an exhibition of regional trades in the House of Industries in the Klosterstraße. There were 182 exhibition companies showing 998 different products to 9514 visitors. The second trade fair took place in 1827 at the same place.

In 1844 the General German Industrial Exhibition (in German Allgemeine Deutsche Gewerbe-Ausstellung) took place in the old arsenal house, the Zeughaus of Berlin. Among 3040 exhibition companies there were 685 Berlin companies showing a large variety of German industrial goods - the exhibition saw 260,000 visitors.

=== Berlin Industrial Exposition 1879 ===
In 1879 a large exhibition was set in an exhibition park created near the Lehrte Station. The exhibition was not only a show of technological advancements but it was also created as an amusement park.

One of the main attractions of the event was the first electric locomotive from Siemens & Halske. Originally built for use in a coal mine, it pulled three small cars fitted with wooden benches, each car being capable of carrying six passengers for a ride along a 300-meter circular track. Electrical power was supplied to a third rail from a nearby generating station. During the four months of the exhibition, it carried 90,000 passengers. The original locomotive is now displayed at the Deutsches Museum in Munich and a replica is shown at the German Museum of Technology (Berlin).

== Background ==
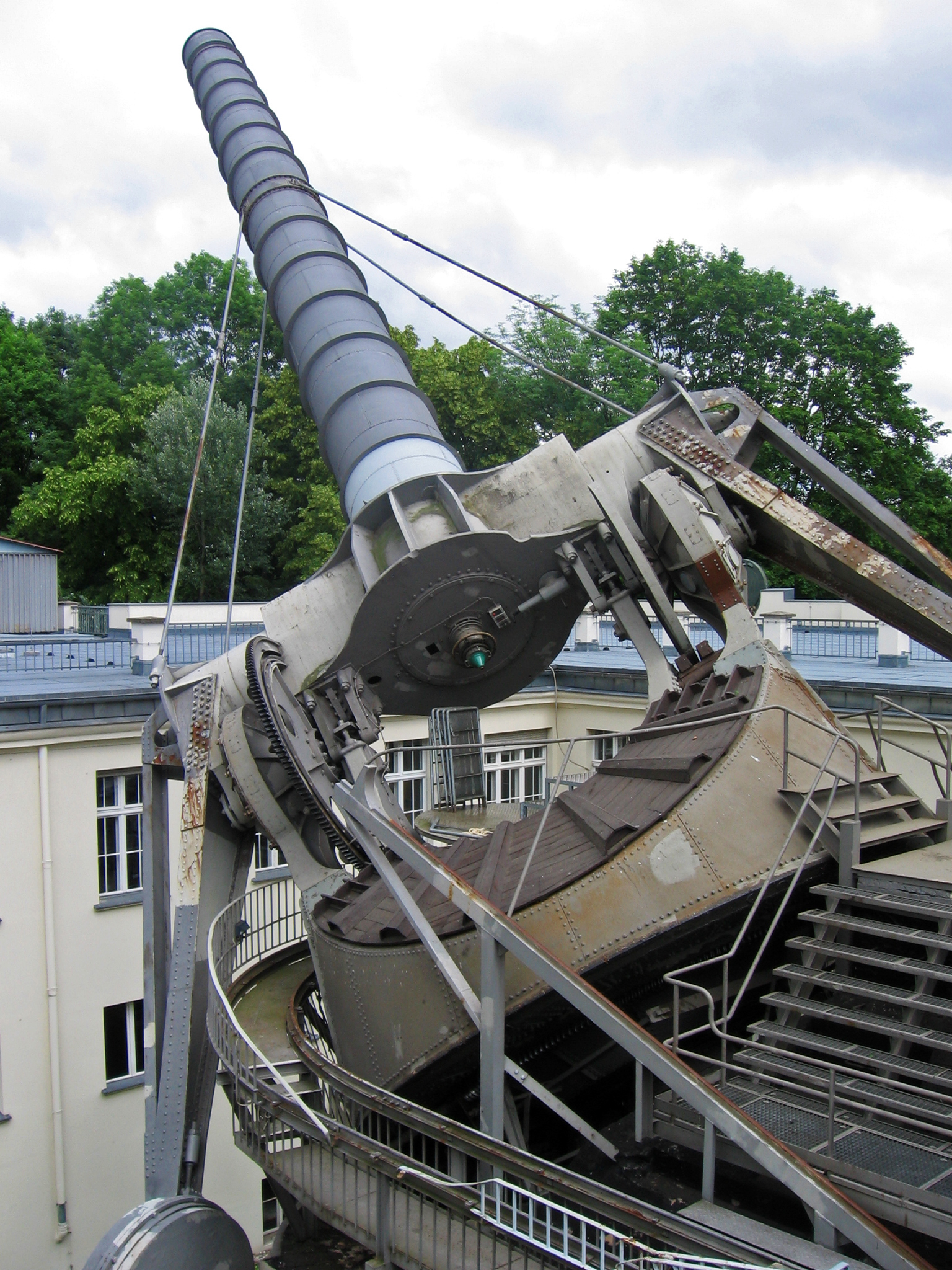
The Great Refractor of the Great Industrial Expo, survives today at Archenhold Observatory

After the successful world fairs in London and Paris the Berlin press argued at large for a world fair to be held in Berlin as well. Especially the "Verein Berliner Kaufleute und Industrieller" (Association of Merchants and Industrialists) was on the forefront - the association had been founded for the industrial exposition of 1879. Its chairman Max Ludwig Goldberger took it as a personal aim of life to make a world fair happen in Berlin. Goldberger had lived in the United States for a time and he had written a book called "Land der unbegrenzten Möglichkeiten" (literally "country of boundless possibilities", the German wording for the catch phrase of "the land of opportunity"). He knew quite well of the international benefits for the industry deriving from a world fair. With the Eiffel Tower showing the industrial strength on the world fair in Paris of 1889 the national press was nearly frantic about a German world fair to show off to the "Erbfeind" (hereditary enemy).

Despite eager proposition around, the national chamber of commerce as well as the council of ministers rejected the idea multiple times due to the financial situation of the Reich. Even though the emperor Wilhelm II was well known for some grandstanding in his time, he was very opposed to the idea of a world fair. On 20 July 1892 he wrote to his chancellor Leo von Caprivi:

Der Ruhm der Pariser läßt den Berliner nicht schlafen. Berlin ist Großstadt, also muss es auch eine Ausstellung haben. Das ist völlig falsch. Paris ist nunmal, was Berlin hoffentlich nie wird, das große Hurenhaus der Welt.

Paris's fame keeps Berliners from sleeping. Berlin is a major city, and as such it must have an exhibition. This is completely false. Paris is simply what Berlin will hopefully never become: the biggest whorehouse in the world."

On every occasion thereon that the topic was brought up he came to be used to say "Ausstellung isnich" ("Exposition isn't happening"), taking up a wording from the Berlin dialect.

In a kind of defiance action the "Association of Berlin Merchants and Industrialists" (VBKI) took over the tasks and they founded an interest group to prepare the exhibition. Due to the political conflict the exposition could not be called world fair however - instead they related the project to the earlier industrial expositions in Berlin and the project was run under the name of "Industrial Exposition of Berlin 1896". The year 1896 was chosen as it was the 25th anniversary of Berlin as the capital of the Reich so that it could find support by authorities.

== The exhibition ==
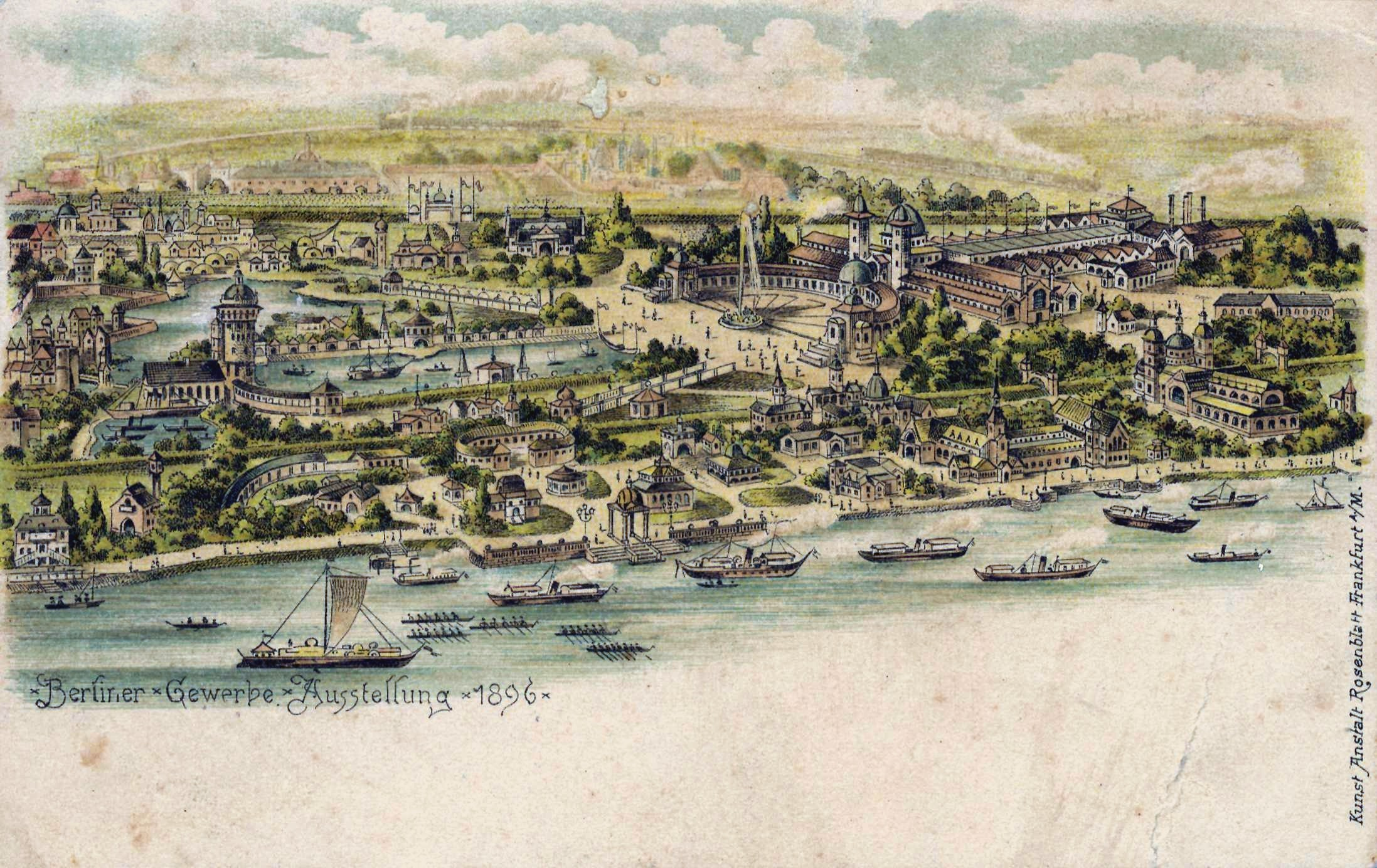
Overview from east across the river Spree

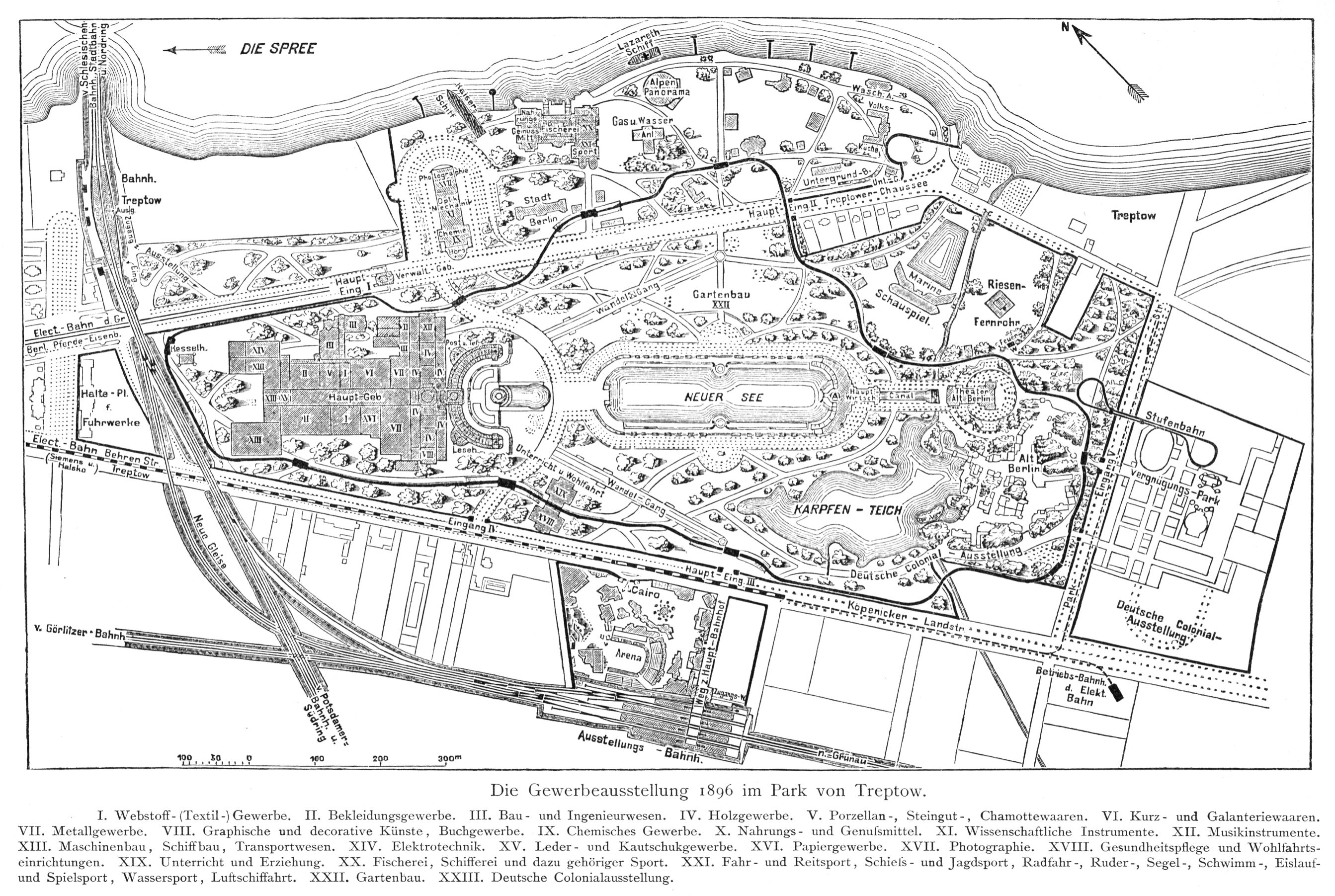
Fairground map (showing a length of about 2 km with the river Spree at the top)

The construction work started in 1894 with the intention to create a show room for the German industry - Germany was at the height of technological advancements and Berlin was at the center of science, industry and services. When the area was completed it occupied over 900,000 square meters - larger than any other fair in the world before. The "New Lake" ("Neuer See") in the middle was created as an artificial water basin occupying 10,000 square meters (it was roughly situated where the central area of the Soviet War Memorial (Treptower Park) is now). It required its own electrical tramway route to get around on the large fair ground. The 3,780 exhibition companies had areas in 23 different topic groups. The largest building with 13 groups was the "Haupt-Industrie-Gebäude" (Main Industry Building) at one end of the New Lake while others were run in pavilions along the lake sides. The electrification of the area required a dedicated power plant on the fair ground - the electric illumination of the complete area was a sensation of its own at the time.

The exhibition was marketed worldwide - although it was rainy on 120 of the 168 exhibition days there were seven million visitors coming to the fair ground.

== Notable attractions ==
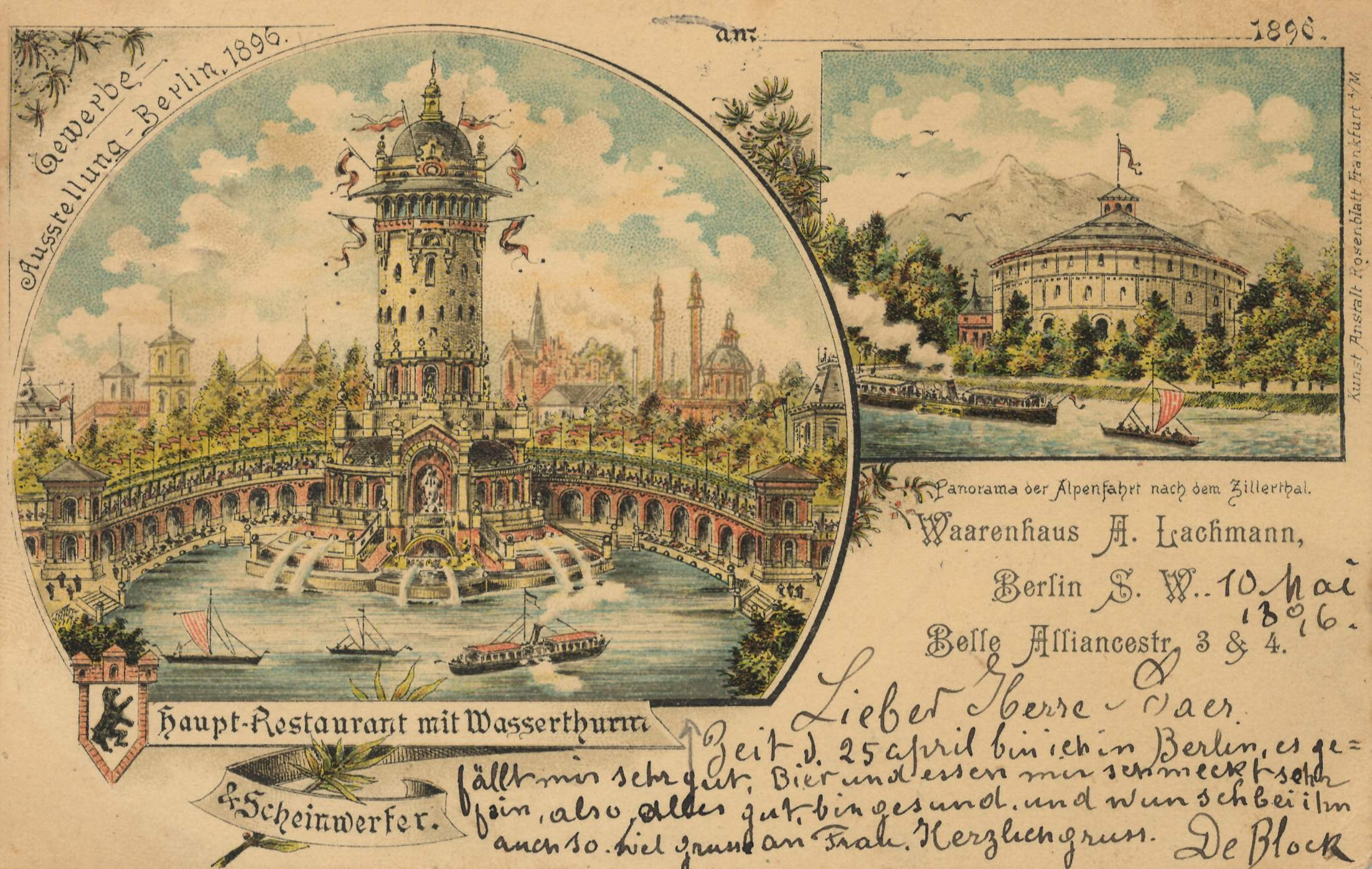
The main restaurant

The exhibition was not a simple trade fair but it was more cast as a piece of art. It was not only about showing industrial advancements but at the same time it showed the world to visitors of Berlin.

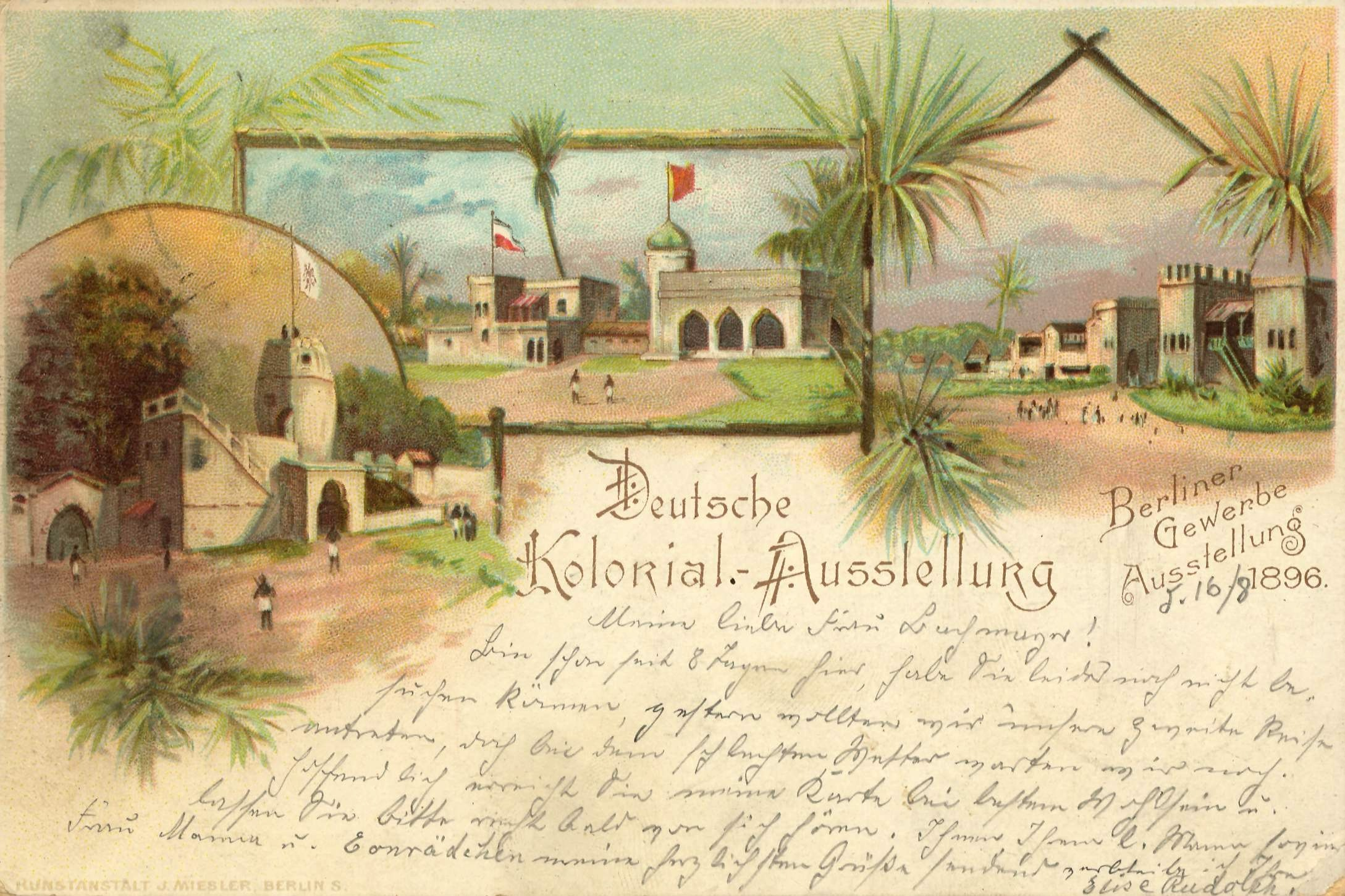
The colonial exhibition

The German food industry not only showed its products, but they were also sold in the many restaurants. Beer gardens as well as high class gastronomy were present all around. In the lake haven one could use Venetian gondolas to travel to the other side of the lake. A circus showed animals from the tropics and a large panorama showed north pole impressions. One could use a balloon to look at the place from above that had also a large water slide, the American Theatre and long series of other funfair rides.

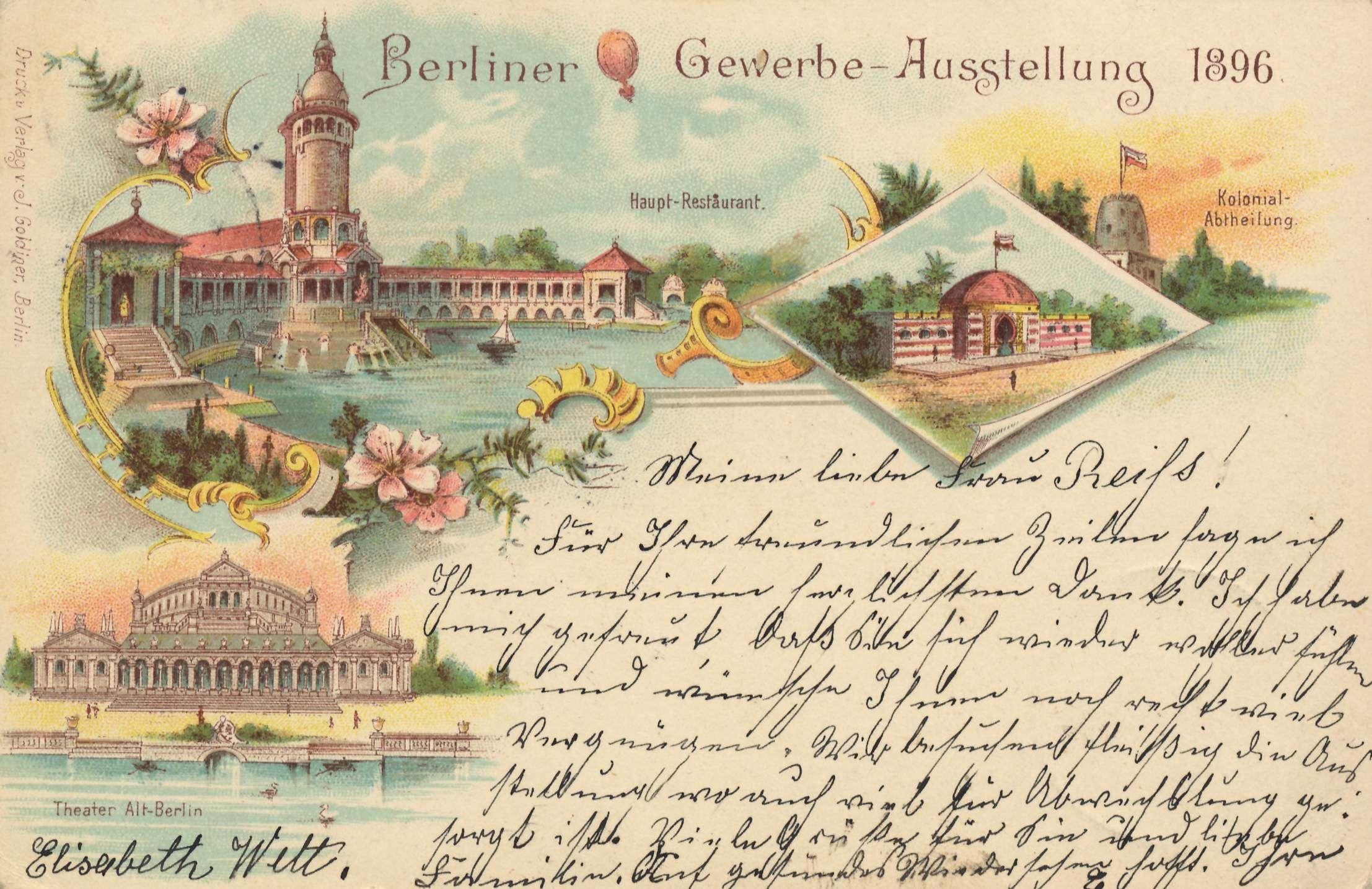
Old Berlin Show

The German Colonial Exhibition (Deutsche Kolonial-Ausstellung) showed recreations of villages from East Africa, Togo, Cameroons and New Guinea complete with more than 100 natives that were brought to Berlin for the real authentic impression. In the "Kairo" section the small bazaar streets of the Cairo Old Town were recreated complete with an Arabic Café and a mosque. A pyramid was erected along with a small Egyptian peasant village. A lift ran alongside the pyramid to the top to be used as a high viewpoint.

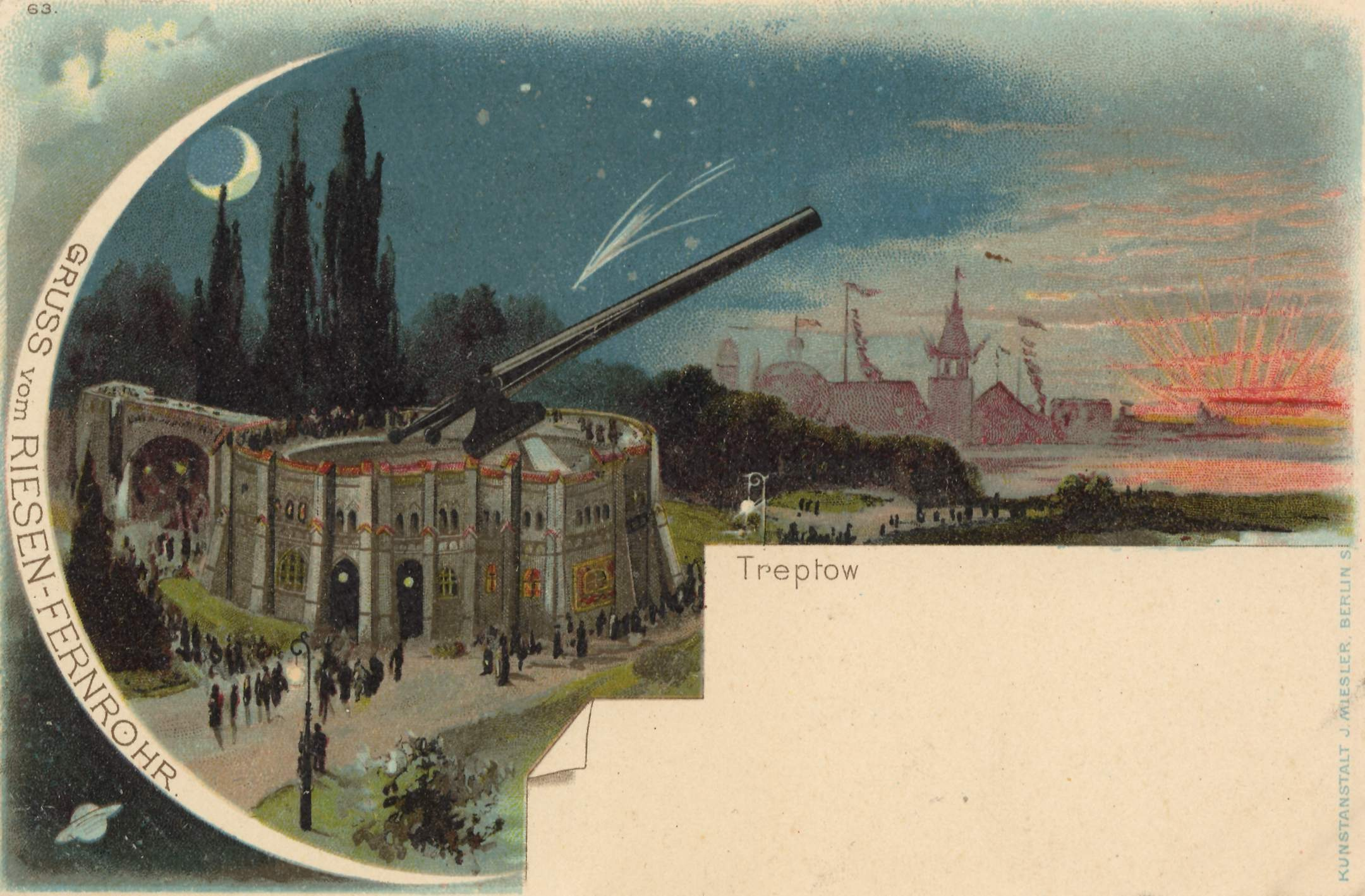
The large telescope

The Old Berlin Exhibition showed a Berlin impression as it had existed in the Middle Ages, complete with a market, a town hall and a theater.

Otto Lilienthal was showing his steam engines - he was not allowed to demonstrate his airplanes but he gave a lecture on practical flight experiments on 16 June.

Friedrich Wölfert showed his hydrogen-filled airship Deutschland.

The large telescope was a major success despite only being completed in September. Due to the large public interest it was later moved to its own building, today the Archenhold Observatory today. All the other buildings had to be torn down as the fair allowance included a requirement that the installations were only to be temporary.

== The Great Telescope ==
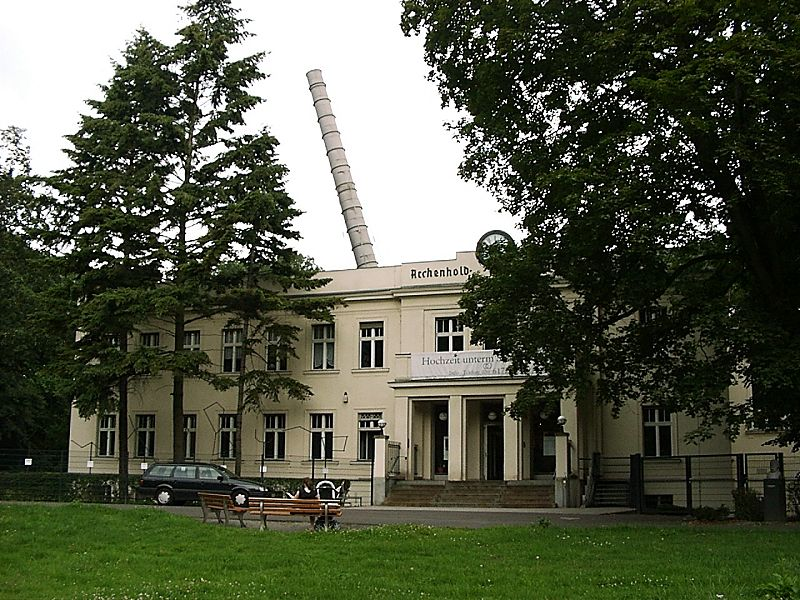
The expo telescope tube rising above the observatory in the modern day

The Great telescope of the exhibition was noted as the most popular exhibit of the expo. At the time the biggest telescope in Germany was an 18-inch aperture refractor, while the exhibit telescope had a 27-inch lens. The tube is about 68 feet long (21 meters), the focal length of the lens.

The lens was made by Schott and also Steinhell attended the lens grinding.

== Fair sections ==
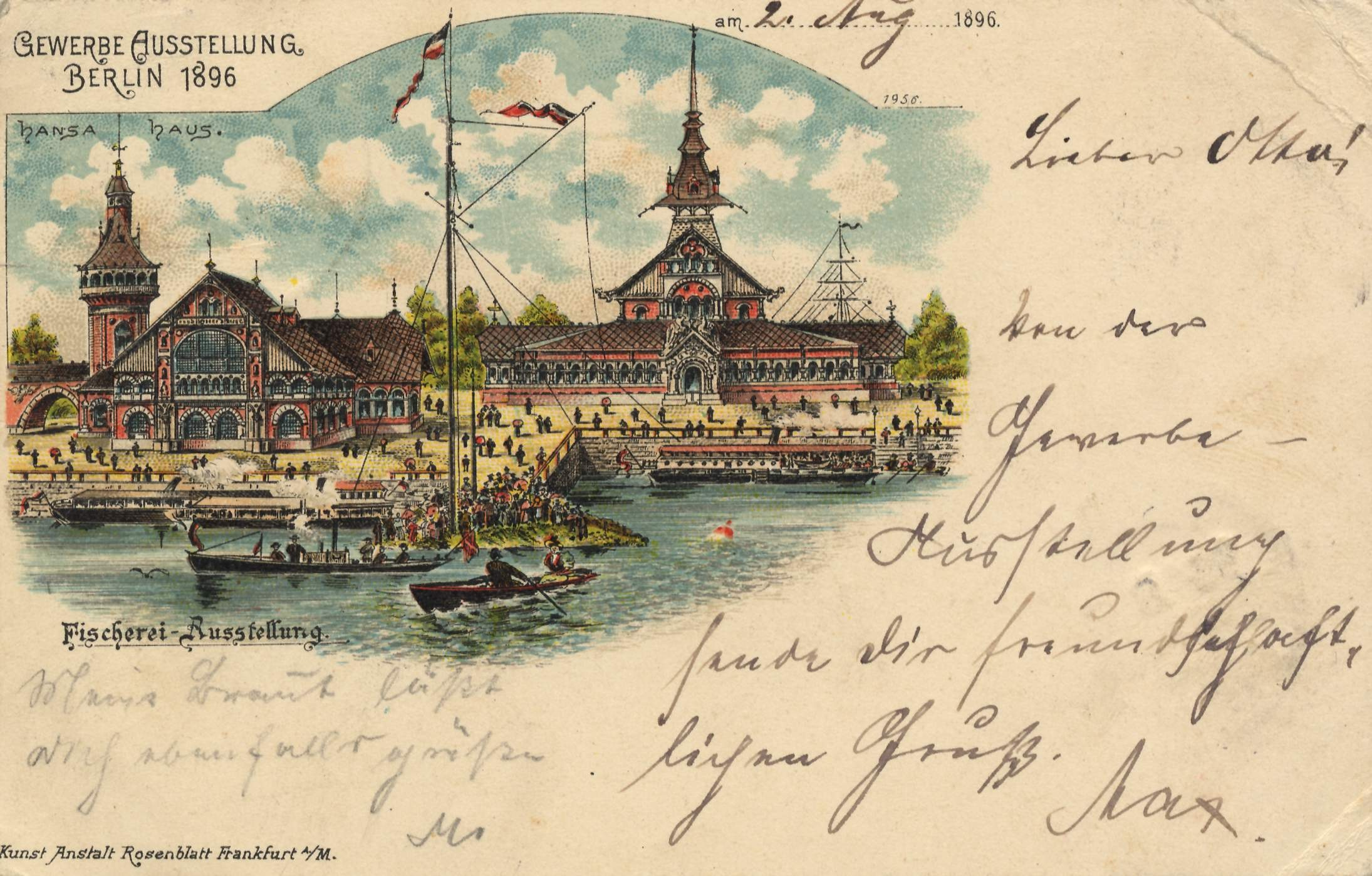
Fishery exhibition

There were 23 industry groups

- I. Textil-Industrie (textile industry)
- II. Bekleidungs-Industrie (garment industry)
- III. Bau- und Ingenieurwesen (construction and engineering)
- IV. Holz-Industrie (wood industry)
- V. Porzellan-, Chamotte- und Glas-Industrie (porcelain, fireclay and glass industry)
- VI. Kurz- und Galanteriewaren (haberdashery and fancy goods)
- VII. Metall-Industrie (metal industry)
- VIII. Graphische und decorative Künste. Buchgewerbe (graphics, arts and typography)
- IX. Chemie (chemical industry)
- X. Nahrungs- und Genuss-Mittel (food and beverage)
- XI. Wissenschaftliche Industrie (industrial sciences)
- XII. Musik-Instrumente (music industry)
- XIII. Maschinenbau, Schiffbau und Transportwesen (mechanical engineering, shipbuilding and transportation)
- XIV. Elektrotechnik (electrical devices)
- XV. Leder- und Kautschuk-Industrie (leather and rubber industry)
- XVI. Papier-Industrie (paper industrie)
- XVII. Photographie (photography)
- XVIII. Wohlfahrts-Einrichtungen (welfare organizations)
- XIX. Unterricht und Erziehung (education and formation)
- XX. Fischerei (fishery)
- XXI. Sport (sports)
- XXII. Gartenbau (horticulture)
- XXIII. Deutsche Kolonial-Ausstellung (German colonial exhibition)

== Literature ==
- Die Berliner Gewerbeausstellung 1896 in Bildern. 1997, ISBN 3-931703-07-X
- Hella Kaeselitz (Hrsg.), Erhard Crome, Kerstin Ohms, Horst Köhler (Mitarb.): Die verhinderte Weltausstellung. Beiträge zur Berliner Gewerbeausstellung 1896. 1996, ISBN 3-929666-25-1
- Julius Stinde: Hotel Buchholz. Ausstellungs-Erlebnisse der Frau Wilhelmine Buchholz. Herausgegeben von Julius Stinde. Berlin: Freund & Jeckel 1897
- Georg Simmel: Berliner Gewerbe-Ausstellung [25.7.1896] In: Georg Simmel: Gesamtausgabe. Band 17, Hg. v. Klaus Christian Köhnke. Frankfurt am Main 2004, S. 33–36.
- Alexander C. T. Geppert: Weltstadt für einen Sommer: Die Berliner Gewerbeausstellung 1896 im europäischen Kontext. In: Mitteilungen des Vereins für die Geschichte Berlins 103.1 (Januar 2007), S. 434–448.
- Alexander C. T. Geppert: Fleeting Cities. Imperial Expositions in Fin-de-Siècle Europe, Basingstoke/New York: Palgrave Macmillan, 2010.

== See also ==
- List of world's fairs
- The Great Exhibition
