= Airship N.S.11 crash =

1919 aviation incident in England

Airship NS11 crash
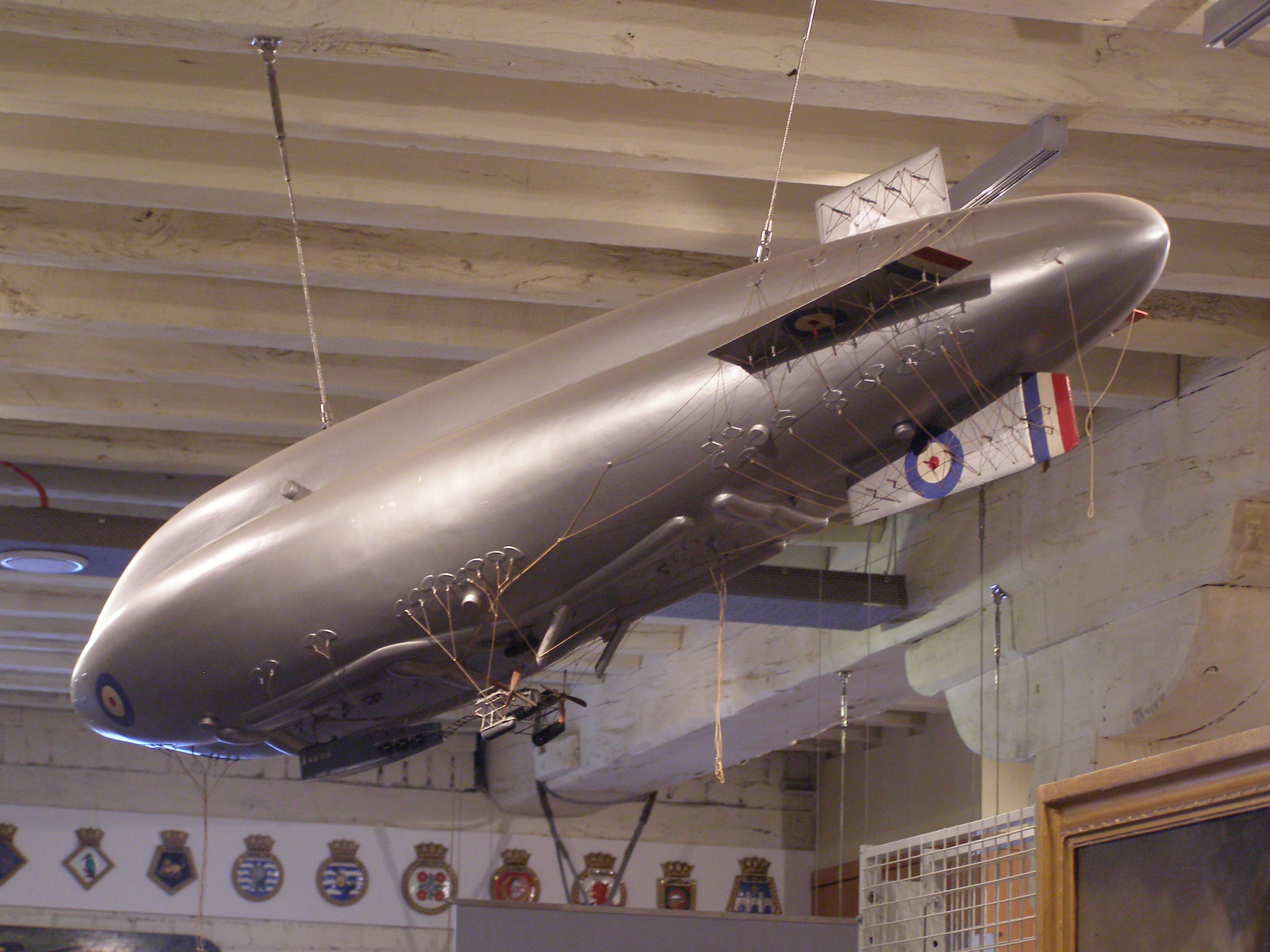
- A model of an NS class airship similar to NS11

Accident
- Date: 15 July 1919
- Summary: Lightning strike (suspected)
- Site: North Sea off Cley next the Sea, Norfolk, England; 52.951°N 1.043°E

Aircraft
- Aircraft type: NS class airship
- Operator: Royal Air Force
- Registration: NS11
- Flight origin: RAF Pulham
- Destination: RAF Pulham
- Crew: 9
- Fatalities: 9
- Injuries: 0
- Survivors: 0

The Airship NS11 crash was an airship accident which occurred on 15 July 1919. The Royal Air Force (RAF) airship exploded off the east coast of England over the North Sea, killing all nine crew on board.

== Aircraft ==
NS11 was one of 14 North Sea-class airships ordered by the Royal Navy for the Royal Naval Air Service, but by the time NS11 was delivered in September 1918, the Royal Naval Air Service had been amalgamated with the Royal Flying Corps to form the RAF. The airship was built and tested at RNAS Kingsnorth near Kingsnorth in Kent. She was fitted with two 260 hp (195 kW) Fiat engines and had an envelope with a capacity of 360,000 ft^{3} (10,000 m^{3}) cubic feet. Prior to the accident, she had made voyages of more than 1000 miles (1600 km) over the North Sea, setting a world record for non-rigid airships.

== Accident ==
NS11 had taken off from RAF Pulham in Pulham St Mary, Norfolk, around midnight on the night of 14/15 July 1919 and was heading over the North Sea on a mine-hunting patrol. In the early hours of 15 July, she was seen to fly beneath a long "greasy black cloud" off the village of Cley next the Sea on the Norfolk coast when locals reported an abnormal noise from her engines (which may have suggested she was experiencing engine trouble). She was returning towards the coast when she exploded into a ball of flames, causing a vivid glare lasting for several minutes as the burning airship descended, plunging into the sea after a second explosion. None of the nine crew members on board the airship survived. The Sheringham lifeboat was launched but its crew could only find a small part of the aluminium wreckage.

The accident occurred less than 48 hours after the airship R34 arrived at RAF Pulham after a successful double-crossing of the Atlantic Ocean, including the first-ever east–west crossing by air.

== Cause ==
The findings of the official Court of Enquiry were inconclusive, but amongst other possibilities it was thought that a lightning strike may have caused the explosion.

== Aftermath ==
There is a memorial plaque and drinking fountain in the grounds of the Viaduct Sports & Social Club in Earlestown, Merseyside. The names of the crew are commemorated on Hollybrook Memorial, Southampton. One of the crew was buried at Ann's Hill Cemetery in Gosport.

== See also ==
- R38-class airship
- R101
- List of airship accidents
- History of the Royal Navy
