= A Convoy, North Sea =

Painting by John Lavery

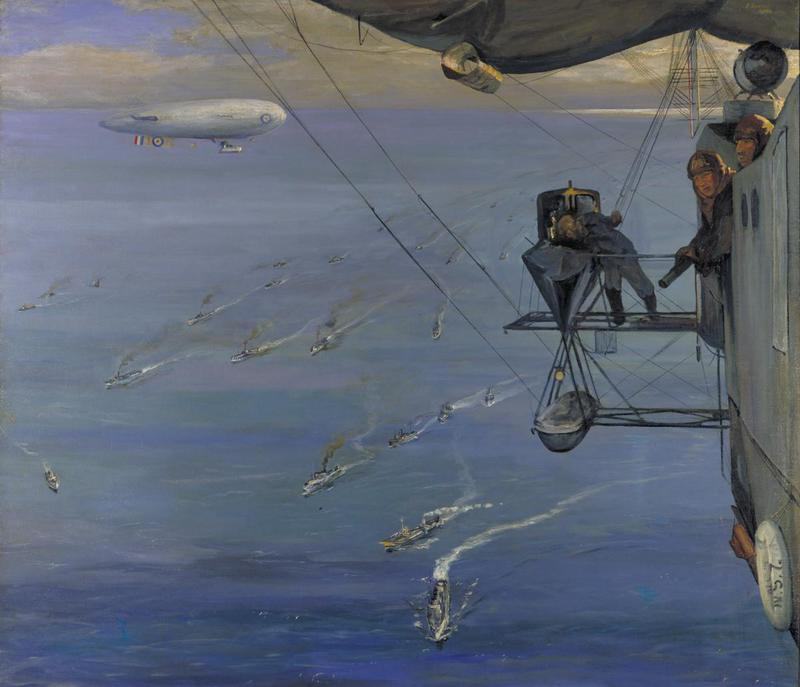
- Artist: John Lavery
- Year: 1918
- Type: Oil on canvas, war art
- Dimensions: 172.7 cm × 198.1 cm (68.0 in × 78.0 in)
- Location: Imperial War Museum, London

A Convoy, North Sea is a 1918 oil painting by the Irish artist John Lavery. It shows a view on a British airship looking down at the North Sea below as gunners search for signs of approaching German U-boats that might threaten the vulnerable shipping. Lavery produced the work while at East Fortune in Haddingtonshire, which was used as a base for naval air patrols to safely secure convoys of ships across the North Sea. Lavery initially sketched the scene from aboard the airship NS7. The painting is now part of the collection of the Imperial War Museum.

== Bibliography ==
- Drozdzewski, Danielle, Waterton, Emma & De Nardi, Sarah (ed.) Memory, Place and Identity: Commemoration and Remembrance of War and Conflict. Taylor & Francis, 2016.
- McConkey, Kenneth. Sir John Lavery. Canongate Press, 1993.
- O'Brien, Gerard & Roebuck, Peter. Nine Ulster Lives. Ulster Historical Foundation, 1992.
