= C-5 (blimp) =

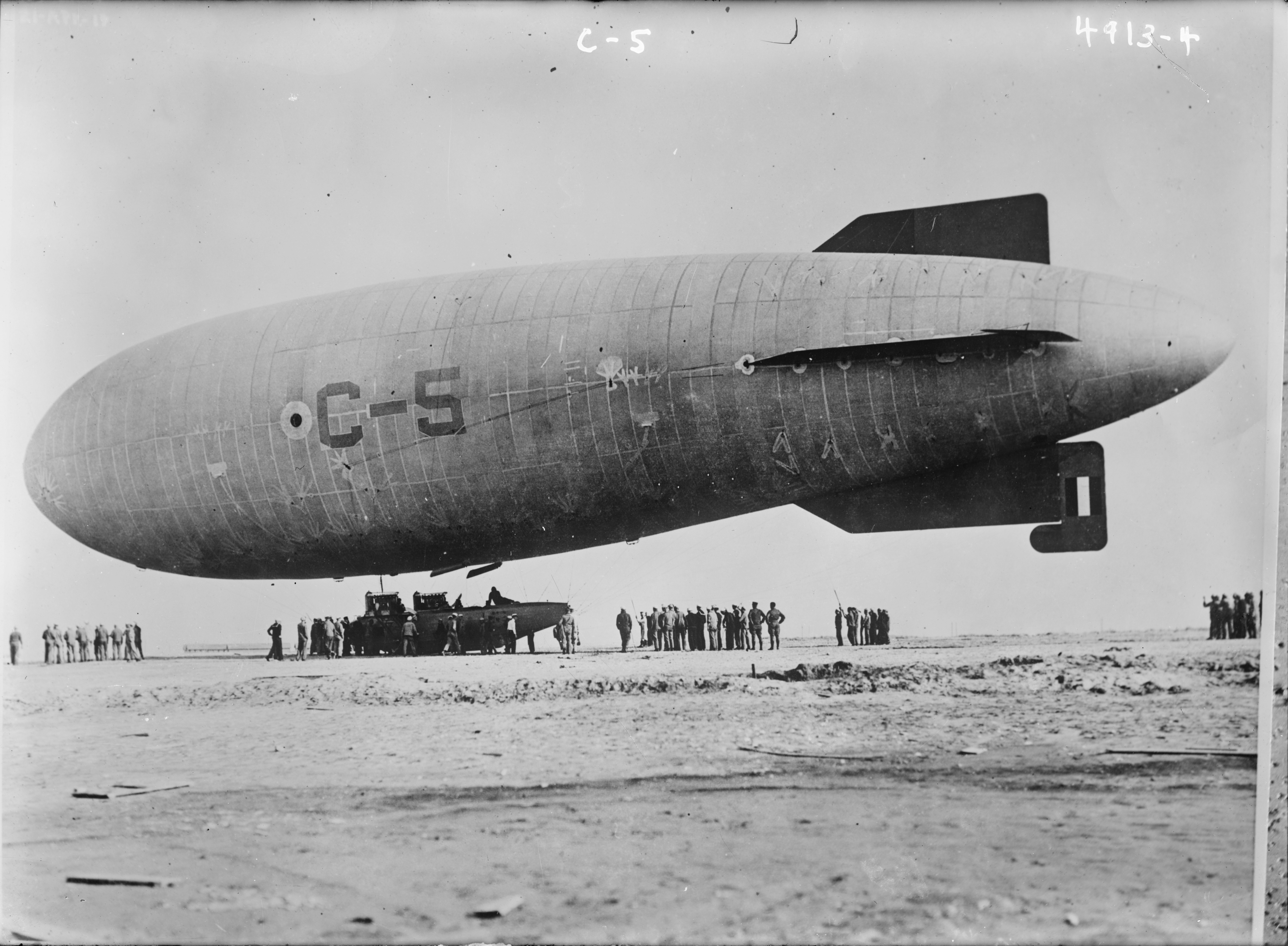
- US Navy Blimp C-5, seen with ground crew in 1919

General information
- Type: patrol airship
- Manufacturer: Goodyear-Zeppelin Corp., B.F. Goodrich Co.
- Status: Lost
- Primary user: United States Navy

History
- First flight: 1918

C-5 was a C class blimp operated by the U.S. Navy in 1918 and 1919. It was one of ten C class hydrogen inflated non-rigid airships constructed by Goodyear and Goodrich primarily for naval patrol duty and training during World War I.

== History ==
The C-5's engines were built by Hispano-Suiza, and its control car was built by Curtiss Aeroplane and Motor Company. In early May 1919, the C-5 made a pioneering flight from its home base at Cape May, New Jersey to Montauk, New York and St. John's, Newfoundland, becoming the first airship to reach that city and in the process sending the first radio voice transmission from Newfoundland. The C-5's goal was to fly across the Atlantic, paralleling the route used by the U.S. seaplane NC-4. Previous attempts to cross the Atlantic Ocean in a balloon or dirigible were unsuccessful. The most famous of these attempts was that of the airship America in October, 1910.

On 14 May 1919, the C-5 departed Montauk in clear weather. The airship made good time, but encountered heavy fog and thunderstorms near Saint Pierre Island and became lost for several hours. Eventually, the C-5 regained its way, but the extended trip caused the crew to exhaust their supply of food and water. Wind and rain continuously tossed and buffeted the blimp and many of the crew became airsick. The airship pitched and rolled so heavily that the engines stalled several times and had to be restarted. After reaching Newfoundland, the C-5 again became lost when its radio navigation equipment malfunctioned. The blimp's crew used its voice radio to contact the U.S. Navy cruiser Chicago, which was in St. John's, and the radio signal was used to guide the airship to the tracks of the Colonial Railroad, which the C-5 followed to St. John's and a safe landing at 11 a.m. on 15 May 1919. Lieutenant Commander Coll, in command of the C-5, said it was the roughest trip he had ever experienced.

While most of the C-5's crew left to eat lunch and sleep, a few of them stayed to service the blimp's engines. In the meantime, a storm rolled in and additional cables were tied over the airship in order to secure it with help from crewmen of the Chicago. The sustained winds intensified from 30 miles per hour (48 km/h) to over 40 miles per hour (64 km/h) with higher gusts, and the blimp began to break free from its moorings. The airship's engines couldn't be restarted because they were partially disassembled. Lieutenant Charles Little attempted to pull the emergency cord to open the gasbag to deflate it, but the cord broke and the C-5 began to lift off, tearing loose the remaining cables and injuring two crewmen. As the blimp rose into the sky, Little jumped from the gondola, injuring his ankle. The C-5 was blown eastward, over the Atlantic Ocean.

The destroyer USS Edwards was dispatched to retrieve the blimp, which continued to drift eastward. Later news reports that the C-5 crashed into the Atlantic and was found by a passing British ship were false. There were also reports that the blimp may have been sighted over Ireland and the Azores but these were unconfirmed and the C-5 was never seen again.

On the same day the C-5 was lost, the British government announced plans to send the rigid airship R-34 on a transatlantic flight to Cape May, the C-5's home base. The R-34 successfully completed that flight in July 1919, becoming the first aircraft to navigate the Atlantic Ocean from east to west, nonstop.

== Specifications (typical C class blimp) ==
General characteristics

- Crew: Four
- Length: 196 ft 0 in (59.76 m)
- Diameter: 42 ft 0 in (12.80 m)
- Height: 54 ft 0 in (16.46 m)
- Volume: 181,000 cu ft (5,125 m^{3})
- Useful lift: 4,050 lb (1,837 kg)
- Powerplant: 2 × Hispano-Suiza , 150 hp (112 kW) each

Performance

- Maximum speed: 60 mph (97 km/h, 52 kn)
- Cruise speed: 40 mph (64 km/h, 35 kn)
- Range: 1,440 mi (2,320 km, 1,250 nmi)
- Endurance: 31 hours 30 minutes
- Service ceiling: 8,600 ft (2,620 m)

Armament

- 1 × .303 Lewis gun
- 4 × 270 lb (122 kg) bombs
