= C-class blimp =

C class
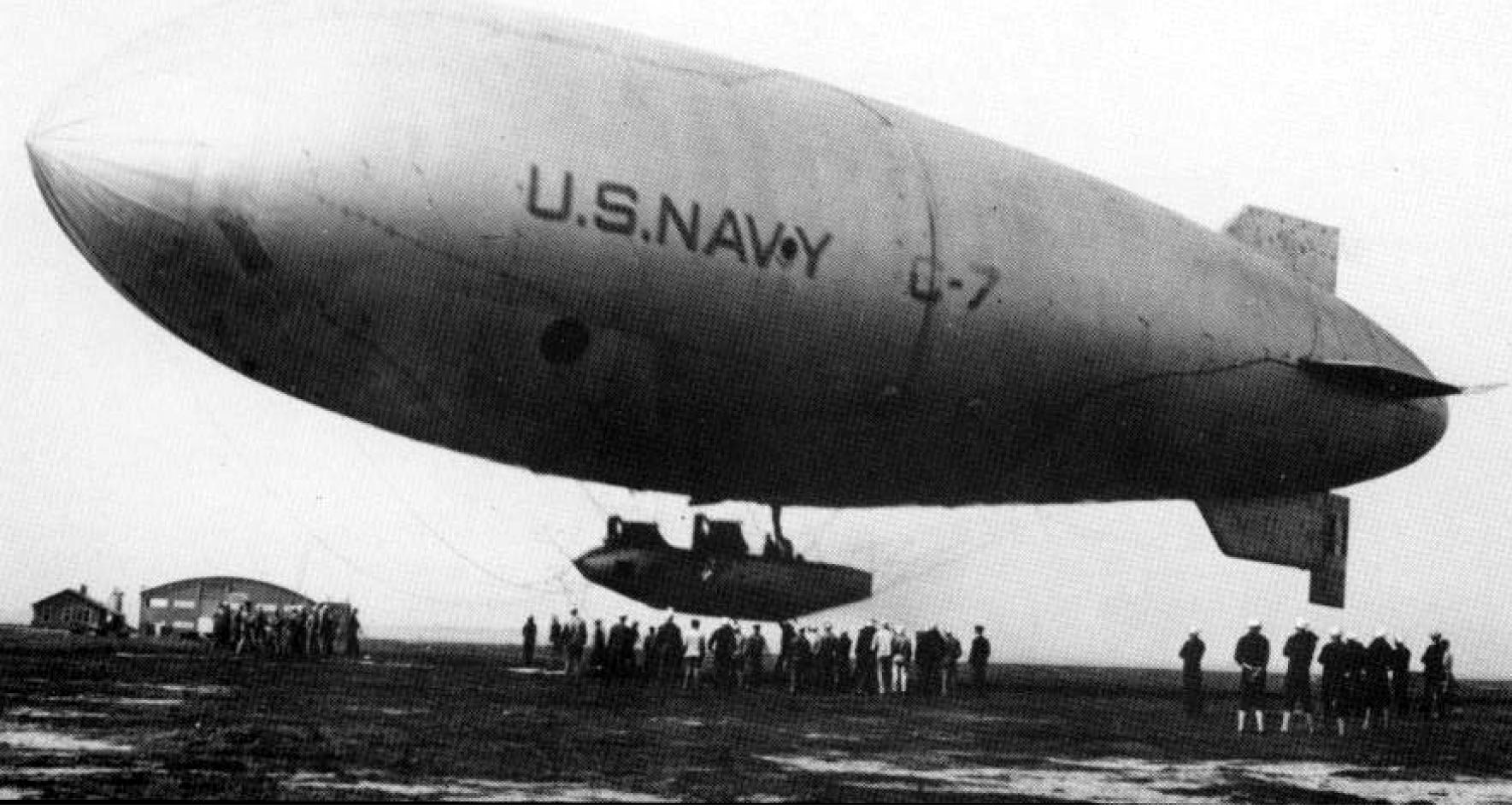
- NAVY C-7

General information
- Type: Patrol airship
- Manufacturer: Various (Goodyear, Goodrich)
- Primary user: US Navy
- Number built: 10

History
- First flight: 30 September 1918, at Wingfoot Lake
- Retired: 1922

The C-class blimp was a patrol airship developed by the US Navy near the end of World War I, a systematic improvement upon the B-type which was suitable for training, but of limited value for patrol work. Larger than the B-class, the C-class blimps had two motors and a longer endurance. As with the B-class, the envelope production was split between Goodyear and Goodrich, with control cars being built by the Burgess division of Curtiss Aeroplane and Motor Company. Originally the Navy ordered 30 but reduced the number to 10 after the armistice in November 1918. All ten of the "C" type airships were delivered in late 1918, and examples served at all of the Navy's airship stations from 1918 to 1922. In 1921, the C-7 was the first airship ever to be inflated with helium. The Navy decommissioned its last two remaining C-type blimps, the C-7 and C-9 in 1922.

== Operations ==
Arriving too late for wartime use, the C-type became more of an experimental airship and was used for training and a variety of other activities. C-1 was the first airship to release an airplane in flight when the C-1 dropped a Curtiss JN-4 over Fort Tilden, New York on 12 December 1918. C-1 also tested a job which Navy blimps would also perform for the rest of their service. It was flown to Key West, Florida where it tracked torpedoes fired in practice from submarines. The most notable C-type blimp was the C-5, which was flown to St. John's, Newfoundland, where it was to attempt a transatlantic flight in competition with the US Navy's heavier-than-air Curtiss NC flying boats. In the race to be the first to cross the Atlantic by air, in addition to the C-5 and NC flying boats, there were two British entrants. This unofficial race drew much public interest on both sides of the Atlantic and was covered extensively by the press in the US and Europe. The attempt ended when a sudden windstorm tore the unmanned C-5 from the hands of the ground crew and it was blown out to sea and never seen again. Two C-type blimps were transferred to the US Army. On 2 July 1919, the C-8 suddenly exploded while landing at Camp Holabird, Maryland, injuring about 80 civilians who were watching it. Windows in homes a mile away were shattered by the blast. On 7 July 1921, the C-3 caught fire while airborne and was destroyed at Naval Air Station Hampton Roads, Norfolk, Virginia.

== Fat Man nuclear bomb ==
The first US nuclear bombs, the Fat Man (Mark III) had remarkably bad ballistics. Los Alamos engineers, in an effort to fit the awkward shape of the weapon into an aerodynamically sound shape, based the Mark IV bomb casing upon the shape of the C-type blimp envelope.

== Operators ==
United States

- United States Navy
- United States Army

== Specifications (typical) ==
General characteristics

- Crew: Four
- Length: 196 ft 0 in (59.76 m)
- Diameter: 42 ft 0 in (12.80 m)
- Height: 54 ft 0 in (16.46 m)
- Volume: 181,000 cu ft (5,125 m^{3})
- Useful lift: 4,050 lb (1,837 kg)
- Powerplant: 2 × Hispano-Suiza , 150 hp (112 kW) each

Performance

- Maximum speed: 60 mph (97 km/h, 52 kn)
- Cruise speed: 40 mph (64 km/h, 35 kn)
- Range: 1,440 mi (2,320 km, 1,250 nmi)
- Endurance: 31 hours 30 minutes
- Service ceiling: 8,600 ft (2,620 m)

Armament

- 1 × .303 Lewis gun
- 4 × 270 lb (122 kg) bombs

== See also ==
- List of airships of the United States Navy
