= NS class airship =

North Sea class
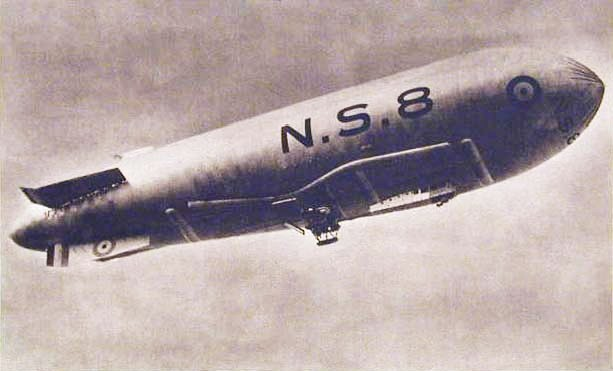
- N.S.8

General information
- Type: Naval patrol airship
- National origin: United Kingdom
- Manufacturer: RNAS Kingsnorth
- Status: Retired
- Primary user: Royal Navy; Royal Air Force
- Number built: 14

History
- Introduction date: 1917
- First flight: 1 February 1917
- Retired: 25 October 1921 (last flight)

The British NS (North Sea) class non-rigid airships were the largest and last in a succession of "blimps" that served with the Royal Naval Air Service during World War I; developed from experiences gained with earlier classes to operate off the east coast of Britain on long-range patrols. Despite early problems, examples of the class went on to break all flying records for non-rigid airships, and the type became regarded as the most efficient of its kind.

== Design ==
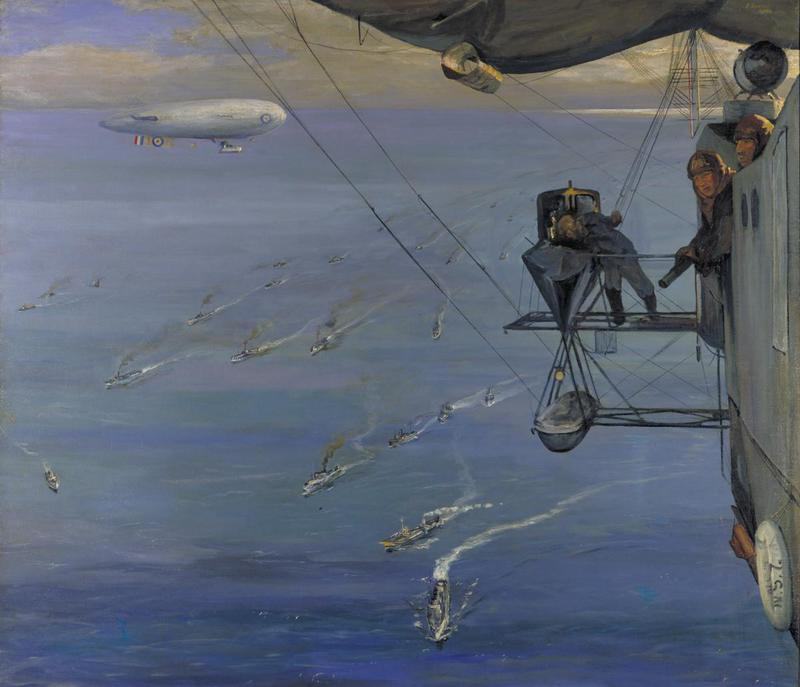
A Convoy, North Sea by John Lavery, 1918

The NS class airship was developed in response to the increasing requirement of the RNAS to carry out long-range anti-submarine patrols and convoy escort duties off the west coast of Great Britain, though its name came from the fact that the type was intended to work in collaboration with the Grand Fleet which mainly operated in the North Sea east of the British Isles.

In 1916, Britain's rigid airship programme was unable to provide an effective airship; the NS class was developed as a substitute using experiences gained with the Coastal and improved C* classes to create a larger and more weather-worthy long-endurance non-rigid vessel. The main requirements for the new design were:

- Capability to carry out flights of considerable duration [ 24 hours with a speed of 55–60 knots (102–111 km/h) ].
- Great reliability.
- The necessary lift to carry an ample supply of fuel.
- Adequate arrangements to accommodate a double crew in comfort.

Approval was given in January 1916 for the construction of six NS class airships; designed and built at RNAS Kingsnorth on the Hoo Peninsula, not far from the Chatham Dockyard in Kent.

=== Envelope ===
Similar to the Coastal and C-Star classes, the "North Seas" employed a tri-lobe envelope based on the Astra-Torres design principles. It incorporated all the improvements that had been previously suggested for those classes – its shape was streamlined throughout, and having a capacity of 360,000 ft^{3} (10,000 m^{3}) it was significantly larger than that of the "Coastals". Six ballonets of 128,000 ft^{3} (3,600 m^{3}) in total were provided; equivalent to 35.5% of the total volume.

Attached to the envelope were four fins. The smaller top fin was merely for stabilizing purposes; while the larger other three were identical in size and shape, and carried the rudder and elevators. The aluminium fuel tanks were initially situated above the top ridges of the envelope, but its varying shape caused the aluminium fuel lines to fracture and consequently the tanks were later placed inside the envelope.

=== Cars ===
The first examples of the type were equipped with two enclosed cars slung from the underside of the envelope – a control car, and to the rear an engineers' car (power or engine car), joined by an exposed wooden walk-way suspended on cables.

The control car was rectangular in cross-section, 35 ft (11 m) long and 6 ft (1.8 m) high, and was constructed from a frame of light steel tubing braced with diagonal wires. The forward portion was clad in duralumin, and the remainder covered with fabric laced to the framework. Duralumin sheeting was chosen instead of aluminium as it is not affected by the combined action of sea air and water. Windows and portholes provided both light for the crew, and afforded a good field of view.

The forward section of the control car was extensively glazed, and formed the pilot's cabin which housed all the flight controls, navigating instruments, engine telegraphs and voice pipes. Behind this was the wireless telegraphy cabin, while the living and sleeping accommodation for the 10-man crew was located at the rear of the car. In addition to the radio equipment, the wireless operators' compartment carried Aldis lamps as well as international maritime signal flags. The latter could be lowered from the control car, and were effective for communicating with foreign vessels.

The engineers' car housed the controls for the engines, and gave access to a flanged hotplate for cooking that was attached to one of the engine exhaust pipes. Two dynamos and batteries provided power for the ship's electrical systems which included lights, telephones and signalling lamps etc.

=== Propulsion ===
The type was initially fitted with a pair of 250 hp (190 kW) Rolls-Royce Eagle engines mounted one either side of the power car in streamlined enclosures. Each drove a 9 ft (2.7 m) diameter four-bladed propeller on independent shafts through an elaborate transmission system.

=== Armament ===
A maximum of six 230 lb (100 kg) bombs could be carried as well as up to five machine-guns. Similar to the Coastal and C-Star class airships, one gun was mounted on a platform on top of the envelope which was reached through a climbing shaft.

=== Crew ===
The normal crew comprised two watches of five – necessary for extended patrols – and consisted of a captain and Second Officer, a Coxswain and Second coxswain, two W/T (Wireless Telegraph) Operators, two Engineers and two Air Gunners. The Captain was in overall command of the vessel, and was assisted by the Second Officer in navigating, maintaining height, and regulating gas pressure. The Coxswain was responsible for the rest of the crew, and for the care and maintenance of the ship whilst on the ground. He or the Second Coxswain steered the vessel in flight from a position at the very front of the control car. During patrols, the Air Gunners took on the duties of look-outs and also acted as cooks.

== Development ==
=== Testing and problems ===
The first example, N.S.1, carried out initial flight trials on 1 February 1917. Preliminary trials were regarded as being satisfactory; the ship achieving a speed of 50 mph (80 km/h) and proving easy to handle. Two further flights were carried out in March, the second of which was a longer cross-country round trip from Kingsnorth to Maidenhead, Farnborough, Guildford, and back to Kingsnorth again. Following the success of this flight, N.S.1 transferred to RNAS Pulham, Norfolk, on 18 April 1917 for more extensive trials. Minor snags encountered during flights over the next few weeks were ironed out, and it was then decided to carry out a full-scale endurance test taking place on 5 June. However, just over 16 hours into the flight, the universal joint on one of the propeller driveshafts broke and the ship returned to Pulham. Then, on 26 June, she again took to the air at 06:00 and remained aloft until 07:22 on 28 June – a flight duration of 49 h 22 min during which she covered 1,536 miles (2,472 km) and encountered only minor technical problems. At that time, this was a record for a British airship of any type.

N.S.2's early trials at Kingsnorth were also satisfactory, but during an endurance trial on 27 June similar to that of N.S.1, she became unmanageable when she lost gas and was wrecked in an attempted landing near Stowmarket, Suffolk.

N.S.3 made an 11-hour non-stop flight on 22 July 1917 to her operational base at RNAS East Fortune following trials in June at Kingsnorth. She was joined there on 6 September by N.S.1, and by N.S.4 from Kingsnorth on 15 October. N.S.5 set off for East Fortune on 12 December, but both engines failed within sight of her destination, and she drifted with the wind for about 10 miles (16 km) before they could be restarted. However, since both engines continued to be troublesome it was decided to make a "free balloon" landing, but she was damaged beyond repair during the attempt.

=== Modifications ===
The Rolls-Royce engines together with their method of installation and complex transmission continually presented problems. They were connected to the propellers via long, heavy driveshafts that were only lightly supported, thus placing undue strain on the transmission system and invariably causing the universal joint nearest the propeller to fracture.

The Kingsnorth design team hastily set about redesigning the power car and transmission gear, and at the same time, staff at East Fortune were also looking into ways of improving the design. Kingsnorth considered the idea of replacing the Rolls-Royce engines with 240 hp (180 kW) Fiat units having a direct drive to the propellers; while East Fortune's Engineering Officer, Lt.Cdr. A. S. Abell, RNVR, together with Flt.Cdr. J. S. Wheelwright, DSC (Captain of N.S.3), came up with the idea of raising the control car to the same level as the engineers' car; form them into a single fully enclosed unit that measured 85 ft (26 m) in length and tapered to the stern, and fit the propellers directly onto the engine crankshafts. These and other minor measures provided the crew with more room and improved their comfort; increased top speed through reduced air resistance (the redesigned car was more aerodynamic and positioned closer to the envelope); resulted in a reduction in weight; and improved reliability due to the abolition of the troublesome transmission shafts. In January 1918, the Admiralty granted permission for these modifications to be undertaken at both Kingsnorth, and at East Fortune where the work was completed by the beginning of March.

Mainly due to the lack of a suitable alternative, official interest continued in the NS class despite the early reliability problems and the loss of two examples during their first months of service, and a further six were subsequently ordered in November 1917. Production continued until the end of the war and for a short time after.

== Operational history ==
=== N.S.3 ===
Under the continuing command of Captain Wheelwright and with Admiralty officials on board, N.S.3 successfully completed test flights on 11 March 1918, and the following day she undertook an eight-hour trial whilst maintaining a speed in excess of 60 mph (97 km/h). Subsequently, numerous requests to start operational duties were submitted to the Admiralty, and on 3 April permission was granted for a three-quarters power duration flight over land. N.S.3 flew from Longside to Kingsnorth and back to East Fortune; a journey of 816 miles (1,313 km) in 22 hours which at the time constituted a record for British airships. During the flight both engines ran perfectly – the starboard engine ran continuously, while the other was only stopped for about five minutes to replace a broken dynamo drivebelt.

On 17 April N.S.3 performed her first convoy escort, and from 20 to 22 April she completed a flight of 55 hours with various convoys – the longest flight to that date of any non-rigid airship. During May 1918, she flew over 130 hours – one patrol lasted for 33 hours, and another for 20 hours which was curtailed only by orders to return to base due to increasing winds. During a flight on the night of 31 May / 1 June whilst participating in the testing of the anti-aircraft capabilities of the Grand Fleet and shore batteries near Rosyth, N.S.3 achieved a height of 10,000 ft (3,000 m) – another record for the type. In early June 1918, she commenced towing trials with the destroyer HMS Vectis to examine the possibility of towing an airship at speed should it break down or run short of fuel. The tests were initially successful reaching speeds of almost 20 knots (37 km/h), and on the final run N.S.3 touched down on the sea to exchange two officers from Vectis for two of N.S.3′s crew.

N.S.3's final patrol commenced on 21 June 1918 with orders to proceed from East Fortune to escort a south-bound Scandinavian convoy. She joined the convoy off Aberdeen around 7 pm; however, later that night increasing winds prompted the decision to return to base at full speed, but severe turbulence and loss of gas caused the ship to crash into the sea early on 22 June 1918 with the loss of five lives. The survivors were picked up from the floating wreckage some time later by the destroyer HMS Moy.

=== Other ships ===
In its modified form the type contributed much valuable war service, and at the Armistice on 11 November 1918 six examples were still in service at operational stations – N.S.7 and 8 were based at East Fortune and escorted the surrendered German High Seas fleet back to Rosyth, while N.S.4, 6, 11 and 12 operated from Longside. Two further ships, N.S.14 and 16, were under construction at Kingsnorth, and were flown after the war.

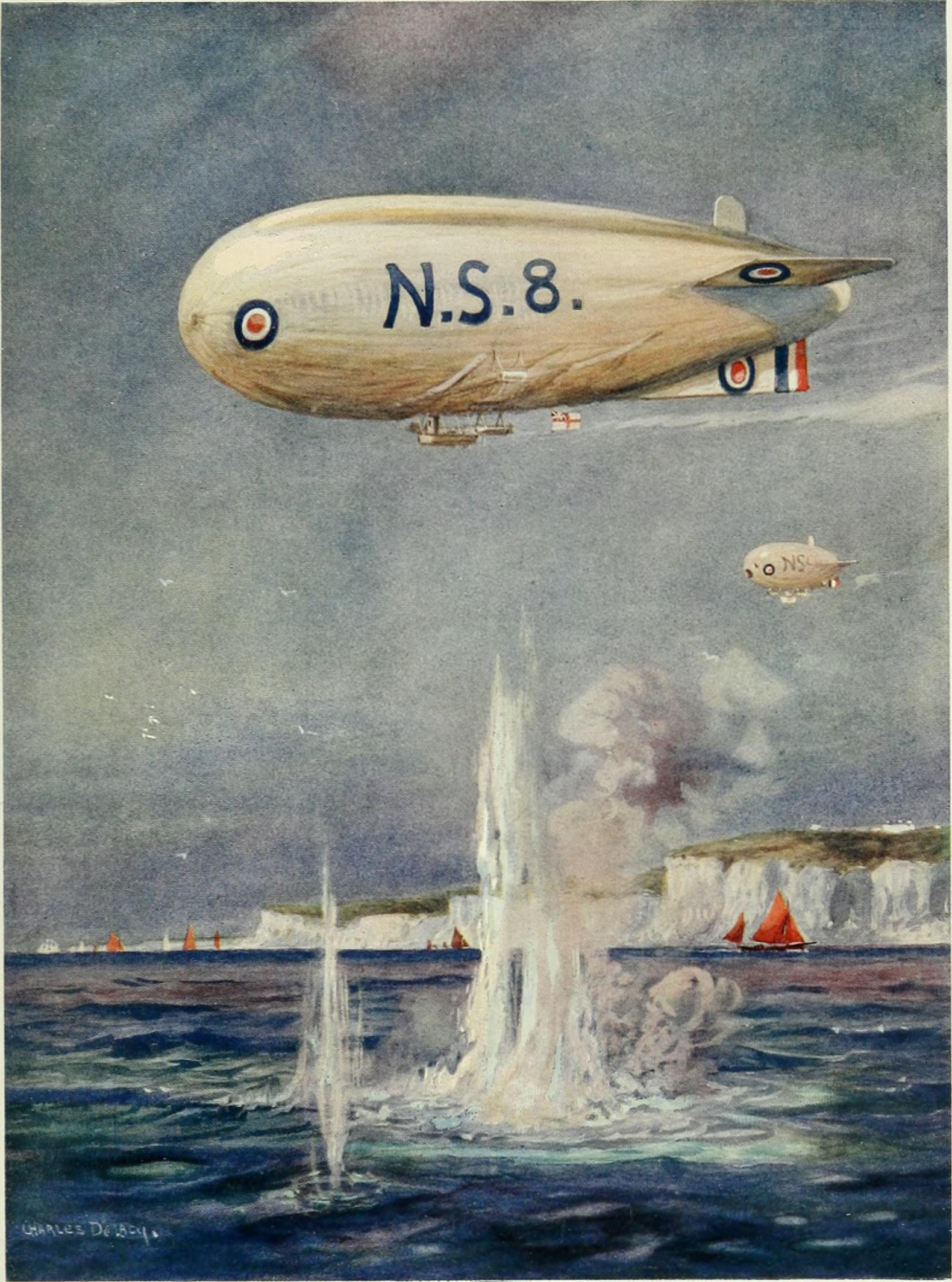
N.S.8 of the NS class portrayed in 1919.

Under the command of Captain W. K. Warnford N.S.11 set an early endurance record of 61 h 30 min, and accompanied by N.S.12 made the first airship journey to Norway. N.S.11 then went on to set a further flight endurance record of 101 hours during a mine-hunting patrol on 9–13 February 1919 having covered some 4,000 miles (6,400 km). Rigid airship R34 then broke this record when she completed a voyage from East Fortune to Mineola, Long Island, United States in 108 hours, and while subsequently attempting (unofficially) to regain this record N.S.11 was lost. In the early hours of 15 July on what was officially supposed to be a mine-hunting patrol, she was seen to fly beneath a long "greasy black cloud" off Cley next the Sea on the Norfolk coast and a massive explosion was heard shortly after. A vivid glare lasted for a few minutes as the burning airship descended, and finally plunged into the sea after a second explosion. There were no survivors, and the findings of the official Court of Enquiry were inconclusive, but amongst other possibilities it was thought that a lightning strike may have caused the explosion.

Following the loss of N.S.11, only N.S.7 and 8 remained in service – N.S.14 had been sold to the US Navy and the rest had either been wrecked, deleted or deflated. N.S.8 was deleted in October 1919, while the final flight of the last of the type, N.S.7, took place on 25 October 1921. N.S.14 was transferred to the US Navy on 8 November 1918. N.S.14 was shipped to Wingfoot lake, then to Hampton Roads, arriving on 30 January 1920, There currently are no records of N.S.14 operating with the US Navy.

In total 14 NS class blimps were constructed. The extended endurance flights and records broken were simply the result of normal operational flying routine while escorting convoys, hunting for submarines and performing other duties with the Fleet, and due to their success in modified form they were regarded as being probably the best large non-rigid airship that had been produced by any country.

== Operators ==
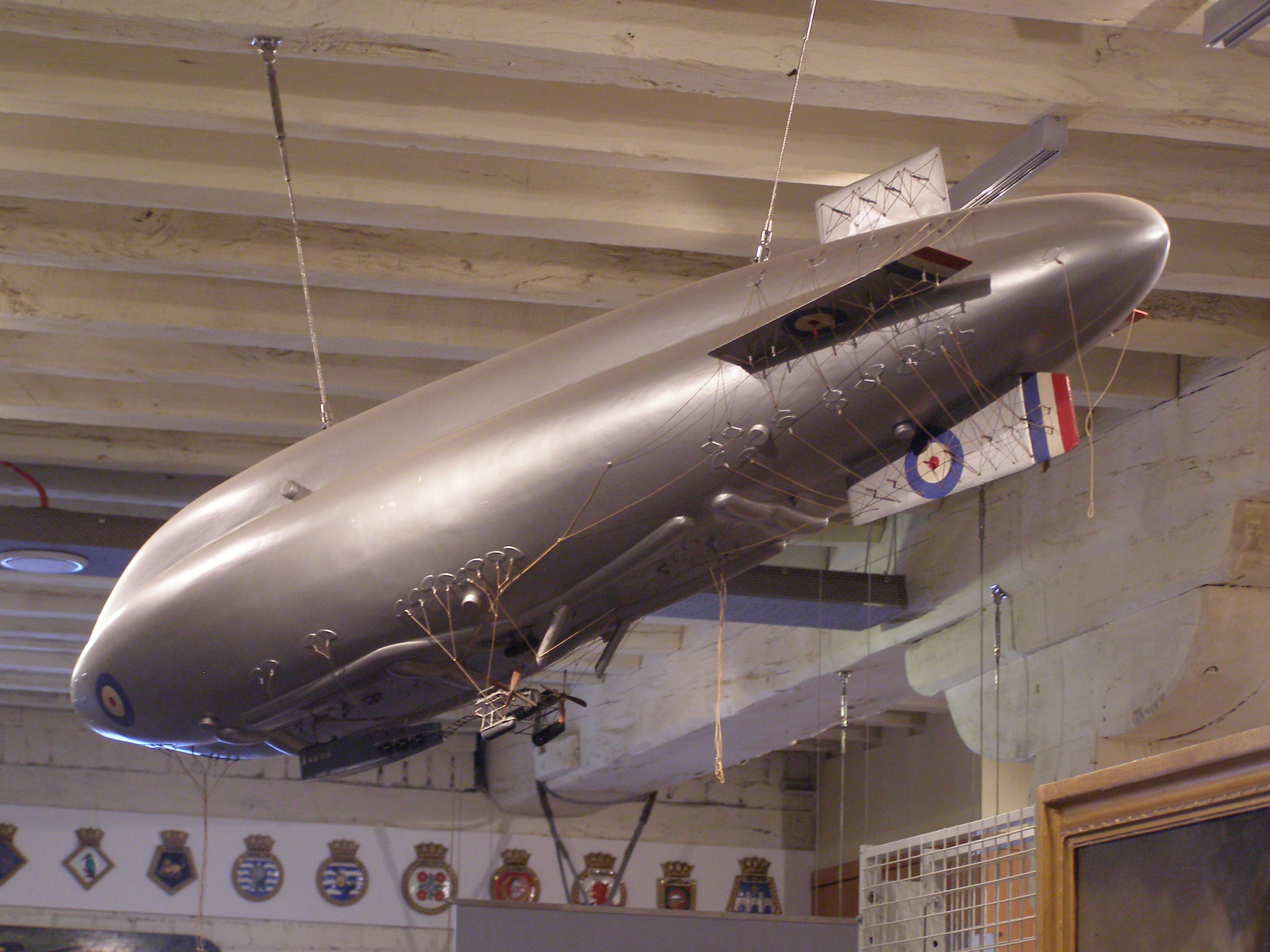
Model at Chatham Dockyard, Kent

United Kingdom

- Royal Navy

United States

- United States Navy

== Specifications ==
Data from

General characteristics

- Crew: 10 (2 × 5)
- Length: 262 ft 0 in (80 m)
- Diameter: 56 ft 9 in (17.3 m)
- Height: 69 ft 3 in (21.1 m)
- Volume: 360,000 cu ft (10,000 m^{3})
- Useful lift: 8,500 lb (3,900 kg)
- Powerplant: 2 × Rolls-Royce Eagle , 250 hp (190 kW) each Later:
- Powerplant: 2 × Fiat , 240 hp (180 kW) each

Performance

- Maximum speed: 57 mph (92 km/h, 50 kn)
- Endurance: 24 hours
- Service ceiling: 9,500 ft (2,900 m)

Armament

- 5 × machine guns
- 6 × 230 lb (100 kg) bombs
- Ballonets: [×6] 128,000 ft^{3} (3,600 m^{3})

== See also ==
- British blimps operated by the USN
- List of aircraft of the Royal Naval Air Service
