= Deutschland (1896 airship) =

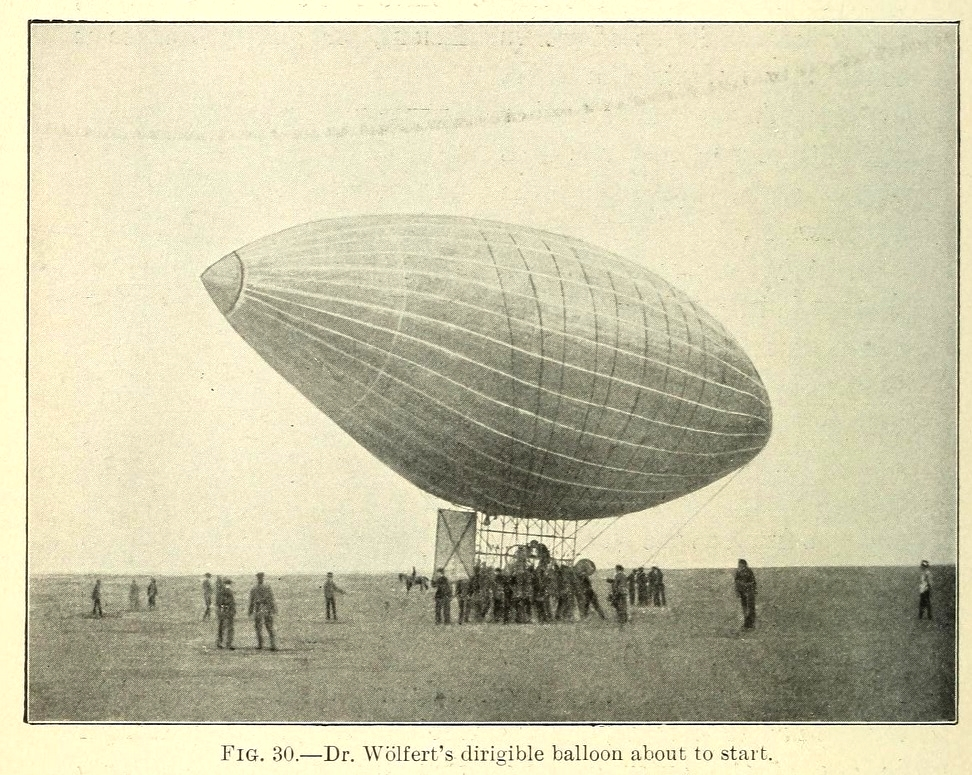

General information
- Type: Experimental airship
- National origin: Germany
- Designer: Friedrich Wölfert
- Status: Destroyed
- Number built: 1

History
- First flight: 1896

Deutschland was an experimental, hydrogen-filled, non-rigid airship built in Germany in the late 19th Century by Dr Friedrich Wölfert. During a test flight in Berlin in 1897, Deutschland caught fire and crashed. Wölfert and his mechanic, Robert Knabe, were killed, thus becoming the first two airship fatalities. It was the second of Wölfert's airships to be named Deutschland.

== Design and development ==
Deutschland had an elliptical envelope that contained the hydrogen lift gas within itself, without the use of a ballonet. Ropes passing over the top of the envelope suspended an open-framed gondola beneath. An engine drove two aluminium propellers, one at the front of the gondola for thrust, and one underneath it for altitude control. A large rudder was fitted to the rear of the gondola.

Power was originally supplied by a 2-kW (3-hp) Siemens electric motor. When this proved inadequate, Wölfert replaced it with a two-cylinder Daimler petrol engine of 6 kW (8 hp).

== Operational history ==
Wölfert displayed Deutschland at the 1896 Great Industrial Exposition of Berlin, where it attracted the personal attention of Kaiser Wilhelm II. The Kaiser was sufficiently impressed as to arrange for Wölfert to continue his work at the Prussian Balloon Corps in Tempelhof, Berlin.

Throughout 1896 and 1897, Wölfert tested the airship. He conducted the eighth flight on 12 June 1897 at Templehof, with himself and his mechanic Robert Knabe aboard. Deutschland quickly climbed hundreds of metres, then eyewitnesses on the ground saw the airship suddenly engulfed by flame. The wreckage crashed nearby, and Wölfert's and Knabe's charred bodies were found among it.

The fire is attributed to the open flame of the engine's Hot-tube ignition system igniting the envelope and fuel tank.

== Specifications (with internal-combustion engine) ==
Data from D'Orcy 1917, p.127

General characteristics

- Crew: 2
- Length: 27.5 m (90 ft 3 in)
- Diameter: 8.5 m (27 ft 11 in)
- Volume: 875 m^{3} (30,900 cu ft)
- Powerplant: 1 × Daimler petrol engine, 6 kW (8.0 hp)

== Bibliography ==
- Collier, Basil (1974). The Airship: A History. London: Putnam.
- D'Orcy, Ladislas (1917). D'Orcy's Airship Manual: An International Register of Airships with a Compendium of the Airship's Elementary Mechanics. New York: Century.
