= Wingfoot Air Express crash =

1919 in-flight fire and crash of a blimp in Chicago

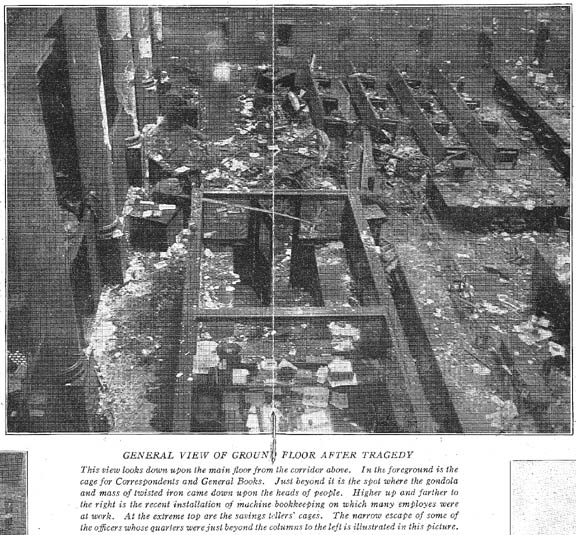
- Aftermath of the crash

Accident
- Date: July 21, 1919
- Summary: Fire in flight
- Site: Chicago, Illinois, United States; 41°52′42″N 87°37′55″W
- Total fatalities: 13
- Total injuries: 27

Aircraft
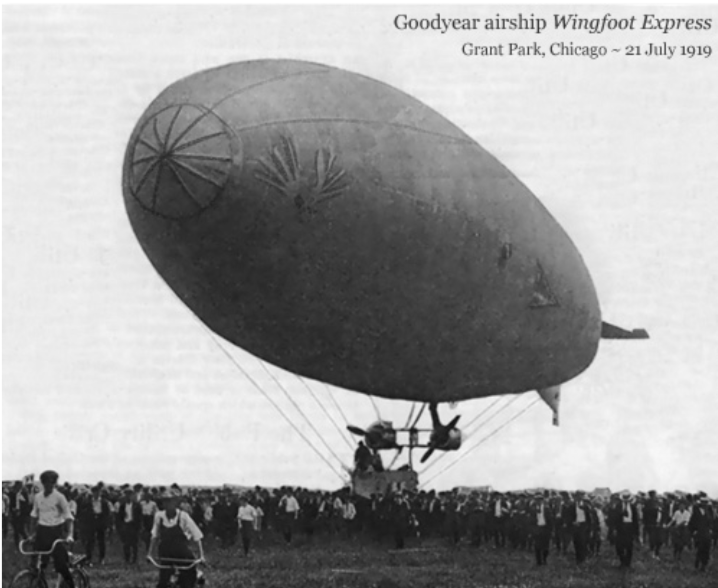
- The Wingfoot Air Express, photographed the day of the accident
- Aircraft type: Type FD dirigible
- Aircraft name: Wingfoot Air Express
- Operator: Goodyear Tire and Rubber Company
- Flight origin: Grant Park, Chicago, Illinois
- Destination: White City amusement park, Chicago, Illinois
- Passengers: 2
- Crew: 3
- Fatalities: 3
- Injuries: 0
- Survivors: 2

Ground casualties
- Ground fatalities: 10
- Ground injuries: 27

The Wingfoot Air Express was an early Goodyear Blimp that caught fire and crashed into the Illinois Trust and Savings Building in Chicago on July 21, 1919. The Type FD airship, manufactured and owned by the Goodyear Tire and Rubber Company, was transporting passengers from Grant Park to the White City amusement park. One crew member, two passengers and ten bank employees were killed in what was the worst airship accident in the United States up to that time.

== Accident ==
The airship's flammable hydrogen caught fire for unknown reasons at about 4:55 pm while cruising at an altitude of 1,200 ft (370 m) over the Chicago Loop. When it became clear the dirigible was failing, pilot Jack Boettner and chief mechanic Harry Wacker used parachutes to jump to safety. A second mechanic, Carl Emery Weaver, died when his parachute caught fire, while passenger Earl H. Davenport, a publicity agent for the White City Amusement Park, had his parachute get tangled in the cables which suspended the gondola from the envelope, leaving him hanging fifty feet below the burning craft; he was killed instantly when the airship crashed. The fifth person who parachuted from the dirigible, Chicago Daily News photographer Milton Norton, broke both legs on landing and later died in the hospital.

At the Illinois Trust & Savings Bank building at the northeast corner of LaSalle Street and Jackson Boulevard, 150 employees were closing for the day in and around the main banking hall, which was illuminated by a large skylight. The remains of the blimp struck the bank's skylight, with flaming debris falling through to the banking hall below. Ten employees were killed and 27 injured as a result.

== Aftermath ==
In addition to causing the city of Chicago to adopt a new set of rules for aviation over the city, the crash led to the closing of the Grant Park Airstrip and the creation of Chicago Air Park (now Midway Airport).

== See also ==
- List of airship accidents
