= Friedrich Hermann Wölfert =

Friedrich Hermann Wölfert (17 November 1850 in Riethnordhausen, Kreis Sangerhausen – 12 June 1897 in Tempelhof (in Berlin) was a German publisher and aviation pioneer.

== Early life ==
From 1870 he studied theology and philosophy at Leipzig, and he founded his own publishing company in 1873. He published over 50 books and newspapers, some of which he wrote himself. In the same year he married Christiane Trautmann, with whom he had two daughters.

== Human-powered airships ==
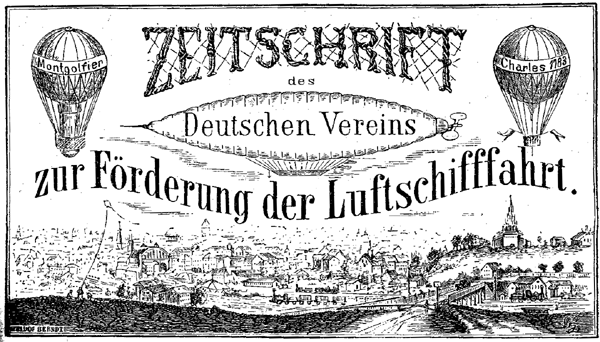
1882 title sheet of the first German technical newspaper for airflight

After meeting the forester Georg Baumgarten in 1879, he became fascinated with airship flight and offered not only financial support but helped him further develop airships. Baumgarten had patented and experimented with his own airship designs, but his royal employer soon forbade him from airship work. Therefore, they both continued work using Wölfert's name. Their first cooperative work, the Dreigondelluftschiff (three gondola airship) flew on 31 January 1880, and crashed. In 1881 further models were built, all of them, non-rigid designs. Due to their activities the Verein zur Förderung der Luftschifffahrt was founded on 8 September 1881.

Wölfert neglected his publishing business, which was sold in 1881. After Baumgarten's death in 1884 he continued the work and built a series of seven airships, including the human-powered Deutschland which flew in Berlin.

== Gottlieb Daimler's petrol engine ==
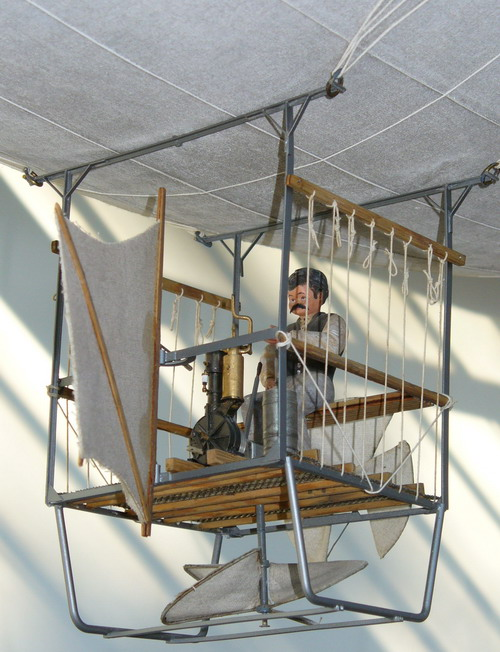
Daimler-airship model of 1888

After flying another airship in Dresden in 1887, a Leipzig illustrated newspaper printed a detailed account, describing it as a muscle-powered airship and hinting at a military project. Gottlieb Daimler noticed this article and, after patenting his new petrol engine for airflight, invited Wölfert to Cannstatt.

On 10 August 1888 Wölfert's airship, driven by Daimler's so-called Standuhr (Grandfather Clock) petrol engine, flew 10 kilometres from Cannstatt to Aldingen (part of Remseck am Neckar) and back. Other flights were made in Cannstatt, Ulm, Augsburg, Munich, and Vienna. He also offered the use of one for military purposes to the Berlin airship department.

== 1896 to 1897 ==
Wölfert wished to present his airship at the 1896 Berliner Gewerbeausstellung (a large commercial exposition). A sponsor provided 50,000 Marks to build a hangar at the expo. At least three flights were made; one on 20 May 1896 reached the then record height for an airship of 1,940 metres (6,360 ft).

Later flights included the delivery of post, from which some envelopes still exist. These successes led to support from the military and at the last, and fatal, flight at Tempelhof. Guests from Greece, China and Japan were present. Wölfert again named the airship Deutschland. It had a gas volume of 800 cubic metres and an eight-horsepower Daimler motor.

On 12 June 1897 it climbed to about 200 m (670 ft) but caught fire and crashed, killing Wölfert and his mechanic.

Wölfertstraße, a street not far from the accident site, was named after him on 4 August 1930.
