= RAF Mona =

Royal Air Force relief landing ground in Isle of Anglesey, Wales

RAF Mona
- Bodffordd, Anglesey in Wales
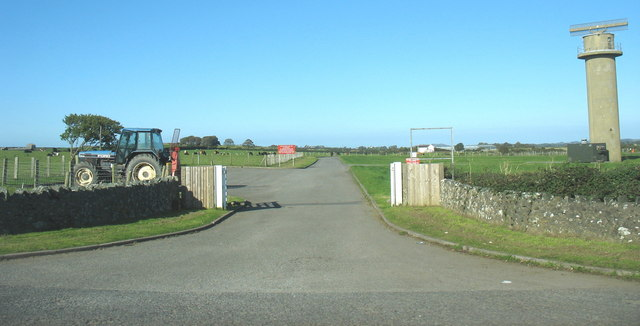
- Entrance to RAF Mona.

Site information
- Type: Royal Air Force station *RAF Relief Landing Ground
- Owner: Ministry of Defence
- Operator: Royal Air Force
- Controlled by: No. 22 Group (Training)

Location
- Shown within Anglesey RAF Mona (the United Kingdom)
- Coordinates: 53°15′31″N 004°22′25″W

Site history
- Built: 1915
- In use: 1915-Present

Airfield information
- Identifiers: ICAO: EGOQ
- Elevation: 62 metres (203 ft) AMSL
Runways
Direction	Length and surface
04/22	1,579 metres (5,180 ft) Asphalt

Royal Air Force Mona, or more simply RAF Mona, (ICAO: EGOQ) is a Royal Air Force station near Bodffordd on the island of Anglesey, Wales. It is primarily used as a relief landing ground for RAF Valley.

RAF Mona is also the home of Mona Flying Club who operate some evenings and most weekends.

== History ==
=== First World War ===
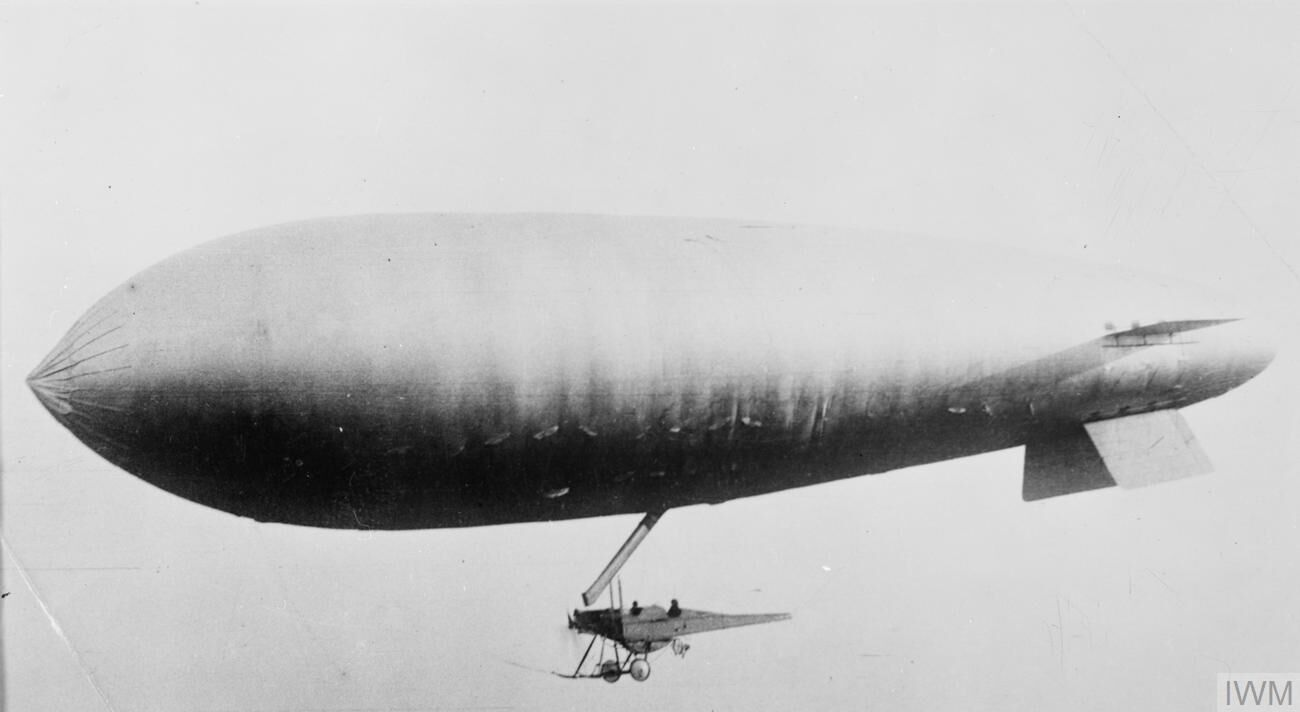
SS class airship

This location was first used for aviation during the First World War when the Royal Naval Air Service opened an airship base here named Royal Naval Air Station (RNAS) Anglesey (also known as RNAS Bodffordd, RNAS Gwalchmai and RNAS Llangefni).

RNAS Anglesey was commissioned on 26 September 1915, when it was operated by 14 Group RNAS, operating SS18, an SS class airship, which was later joined by airships SS22, SS24 and SS25. The station had in a large airship hangar, 120 by 318 feet (37 m × 97 m) long, workshops, hydrogen gas production sheds and accommodation huts. The airships, which could drop bombs, escorted ships and patrolled for enemy submarines in the central section of the Irish Sea between Bardsey Island, Dublin, the Isle of Man and Morecambe Bay. This area includes the approaches to the Port of Liverpool, then one of the busiest ports in the world.

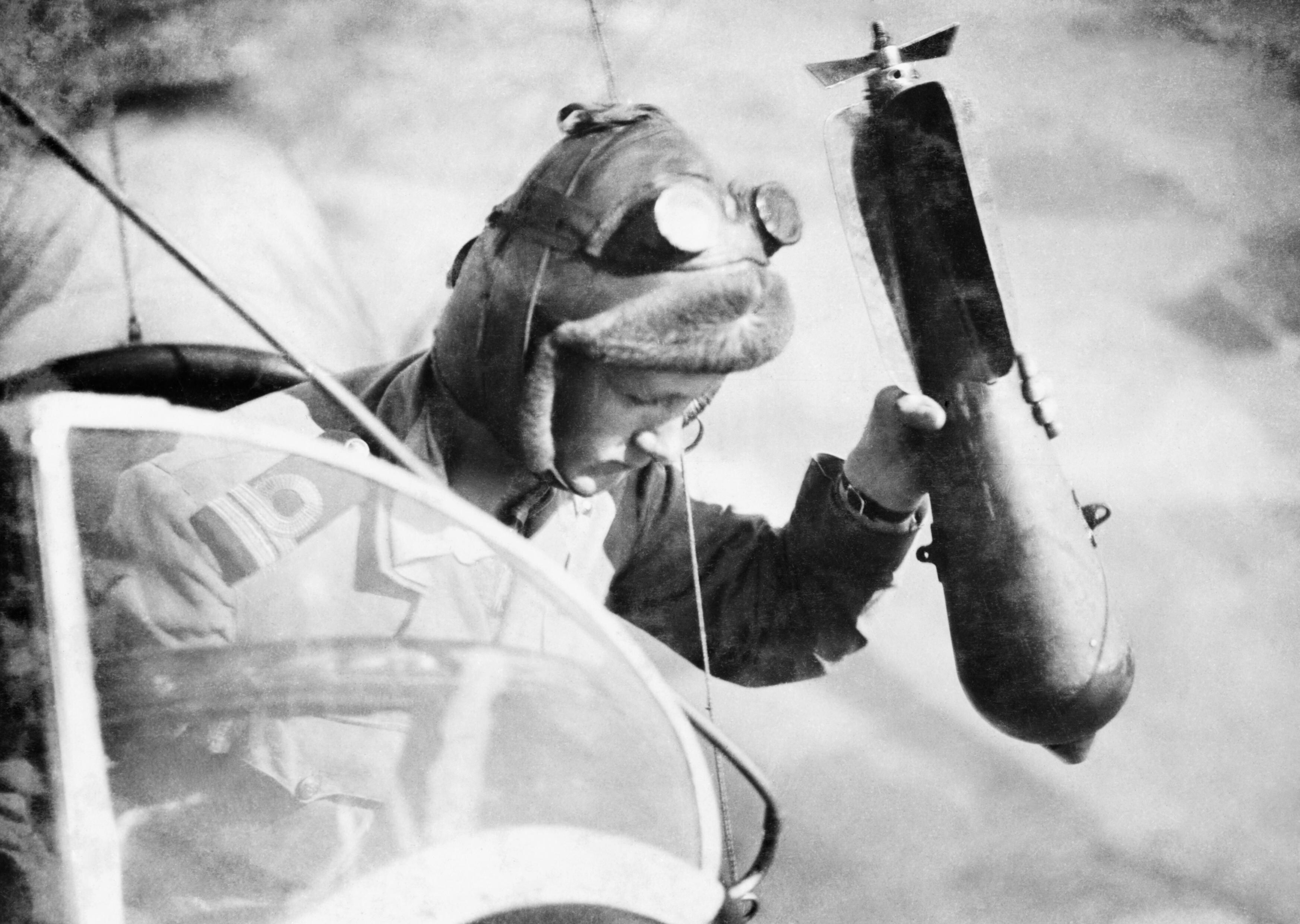
Dropping a bomb from an SSZ class airship

In June 1917 three SSP class airships, SSP1, SSP5 and SSP6, replaced two of the original SS class airships, the other two old airships continued in use. The airships were later replaced by eight SSZ class airships, which had greater speed, endurance and bomb load.

The airships communicated by radio with a relay station at Llaneilian on the north coast of Anglesey, whose operators contacted the airship station by telephone.

In November 1917 an unsuccessful attempt was made to base Airco DH.4 light bomber biplanes at RNAS Anglesey. From August to November 1918, eight Airco DH.6 biplanes of No. 255 Squadron RAF were based at RNAS Anglesey, but the poorly-drained land caused difficulty, and the aircraft were transferred to the newly opened Bangor Aerodrome on the mainland.

In July 1918 a mooring-out site was established in the grounds of Malahide Castle, 9 miles (14 km) north of Dublin. There were plans to base airships at Malahide from 1919, but the plans were abandoned at the end of the war.

Experimental work conducted at RNAS Anglesey during the First World War included the use of hydrophones suspended under airships to detect submarines, the use of phosphorus to create smoke screens at sea, and the use of hydrogen from the airship envelope to fuel the engine.

At the end of the First World War, Major Thomas Elmhirst, the commanding officer of the station, celebrated the armistice by successfully piloting an SSZ airship under the Menai Suspension Bridge. The act did not harm Elmhirst's career, and he later became Air Marshal Sir Thomas Walker Elmhirst, a senior commander of the RAF.

In 1920 the site was bought by Anglesey County Council. The aircraft shed was demolished and some of the buildings were used as an isolation hospital.

=== Second World War ===
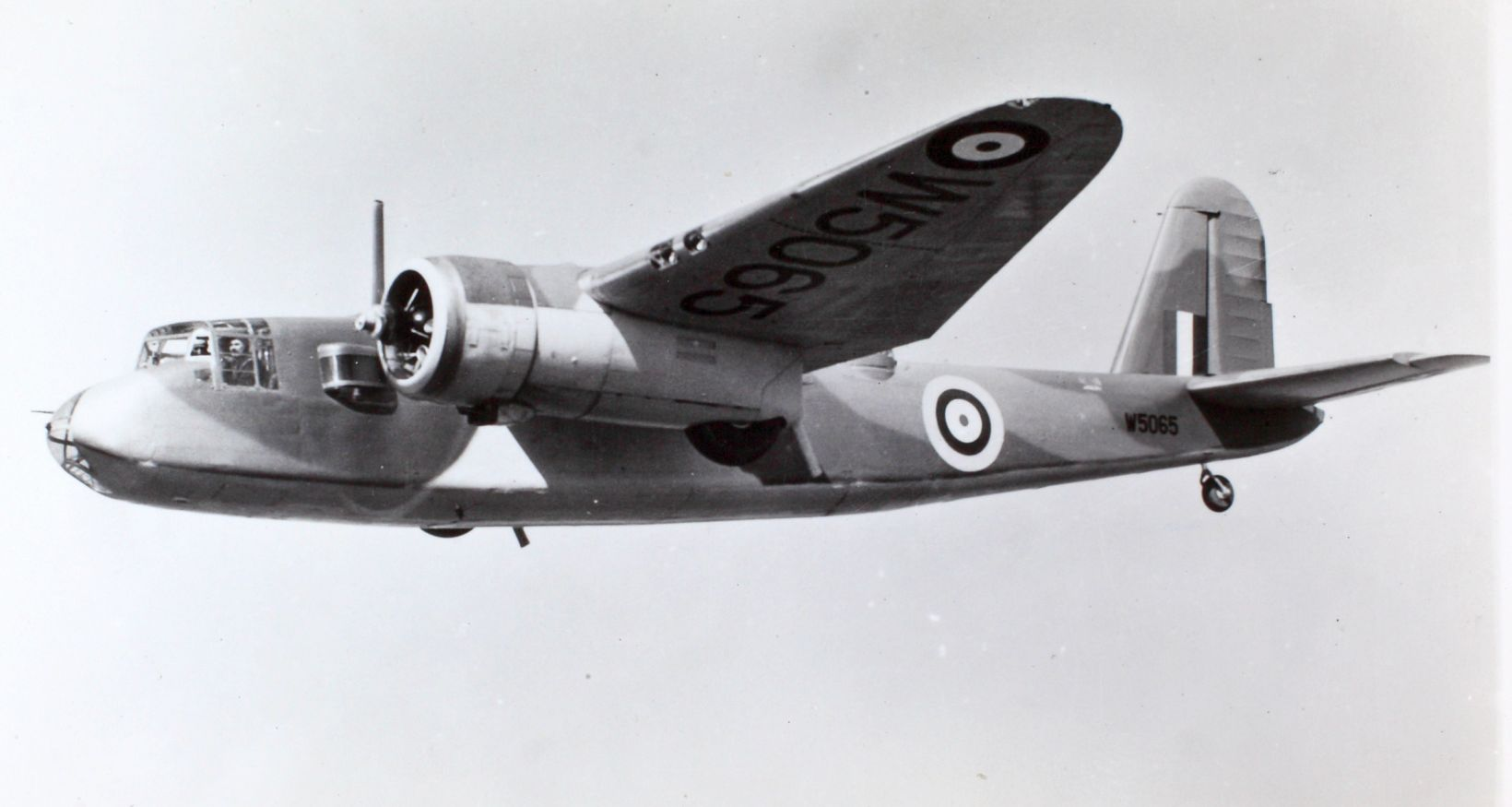
Blackburn Botha torpedo bomber

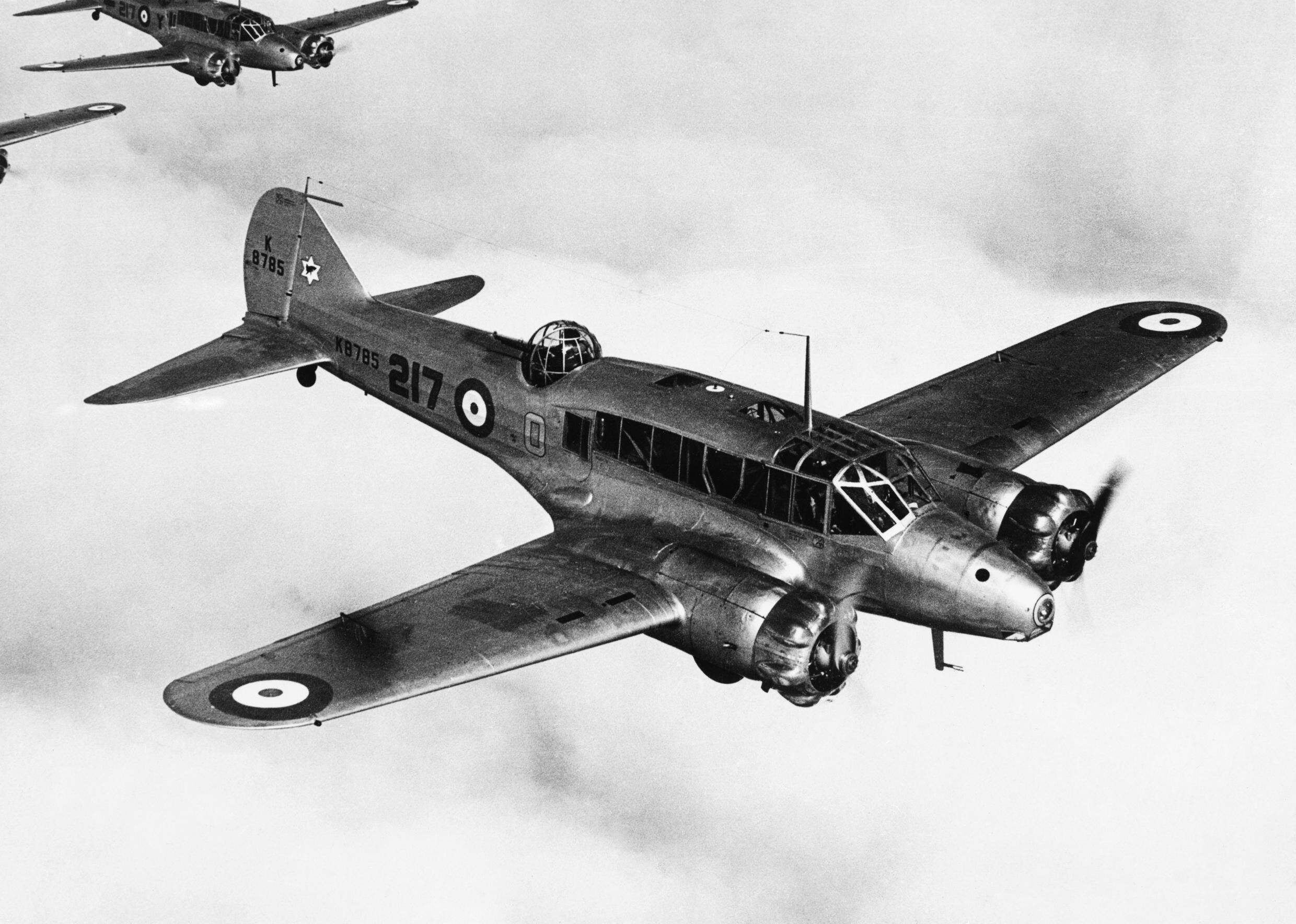
Avro Anson

In 1941 the site was requisitioned for use as an airfield, and the hospital was transferred to Llangefni. In 1942 three tee hangars and seventeen blister hangars were constructed, and concrete runways were laid in 1943. At this time the base was controlled by RAF Flying Training Command. The RAF base was initially named RAF Heneglwys (a nearby hamlet) but was soon renamed RAF Mona (Latin for Anglesey).

The base was intended to be used by No. 6 Air Gunnery School (AGS), but this unit was not established and RAF Mona was instead used by 3 AGS, which transferred from RAF Castle Kennedy in south-west Scotland in December 1942. 3 AGS was initially equipped with 48 Blackburn Botha torpedo bombers, 6 Fairey Battle light bombers and 8 Miles Martinet target tug aircraft. These were subsequently replaced by Avro Anson multi-role aircraft. in October 1943, 3 AGS returned to RAF Castle Kennedy.

In spring 1943 RAF Mona was used by No. 5 (Pilots) Advanced Flying Unit to train Turkish officers, using Miles Master aircraft. From November 1943 until June 1945, No. 8 (Observers) Advanced Flying Unit were based at RAF Mona, equipped with Avro Ansons. At the end of the Second World War, 1,378 officers and men of the RAF and 408 officers and women of the WAAF were based at RAF Mona. The airfield was placed on care and maintenance at the end of the war.

=== After 1945 ===
RAF Mona reopened in 1951 as a relief landing ground for RAF Valley, then used by No. 202 Advanced Flying School operating de Havilland Vampire jet fighters. RAF Mona still has this role.

Today, Mona is used for circuit practice by BAE Systems Hawk T.2's from RAF Valley along with a civilian flying club and 2474 (Cefni) Squadron Air Training Corps.

=== RAF units ===
The following units were based at RAF Mona:

- No. 3 Air Gunners School RAF (December 1942 - November 1943)
- Satellite of No. 4 Flying Training School RAF (August 1960 - )
- Detachment of No. 5 (Pilots) Advanced Flying Unit RAF (February - March 1943)
- Relief Landing Ground for No. 7 Flying Training School RAF (June 1954 - August 1960)
- No. 8 (Observers) Advanced Flying Unit RAF (November 1943 - June 1945)
- No. 63 Gliding School RAF (June - December 1946)
- Relief Landing Ground for No. 202 Advanced Flying School RAF (July 1951 - June 1954)
- No. 255 Squadron RAF
- No. 521 (Special Duty) Flight (June - August 1918)
- No. 522 (Special Duty) Flight (June - August 1918)
- No. 577 Squadron RAF
- Detachment of No. 1606 (Anti-Aircraft Co-operation) Flight RAF (January - February 1943 & February 1944)

== Accidents and incidents ==
A Hawk aircraft crashed at RAF Mona in 2007. The pilot ejected safely and made a full recovery.

A Hawk aircraft overshot the runway on 13 September 2013. The aircraft was practising forced landings when it hit a goose while on the runway and ended up in the arresting safety net. Both instructor and pupil were unhurt.

In June 2016 a man was convicted of endangering aircraft by shining a powerful torch at pilots undertaking night-time fast jet training at RAF Mona.

== See also ==
- List of Royal Air Force stations
- List of air stations of the Royal Navy

== Bibliography ==
- McLelland, Tim (2010). Action Stations Revisited: The Complete History of Britain's Military Airfields. Vol. 5: Wales and the Midlands. Manchester, UK: Crecy Pub. ISBN 978-0-85979-111-3.
- Sturtivant, R.; Hamlin, J. (2007). Royal Air Force flying training and support units since 1912. UK: Air-Britain (Historians). ISBN 978-0851-3036-59.
