= RNAS Capel =

Royal Naval Air Service, then Royal Air Force airship station in Kent, England

RNAS Capel RAF Folkestone
- Near Folkestone, Kent in England

Site information
- Type: Airship station
- Owner: Admiralty; Air Ministry
- Operator: Royal Naval Air Service; Royal Air Force
- Condition: Closed

Location
- Shown within Kent RNAS Capel (the United Kingdom)
- Coordinates: 51°06′21″N 1°13′37″E

Site history
- Built: 1915
- In use: 1915 - 1919
- Battles/wars: First World War

RNAS Capel (later RAF Folkestone) was a First World War airship station operated by the Royal Naval Air Service near Folkestone, Kent, England.

== History ==
When Germany declared in February 1915 that it would commence unrestricted submarine warfare, the Royal Navy responded with the building of airship stations around the coast. Being close to the Dover Straits the open fields east of Capel-le-Ferne were seen as ideal location for a base and work began in April 1915. Although not entirely completed, the base was officially opened on 8 May 1915, under the command of Lt. A.D. Cunningham. The first airship for Capel was to have been SS-1 the first of a new sea scout class of non-rigid airships, on delivery to Capel from RNAS Kingsnorth on 7 May it hit telegraph wires and was destroyed. Despite the accident, more sea scouts were soon delivered to Capel.

== Airship production ==
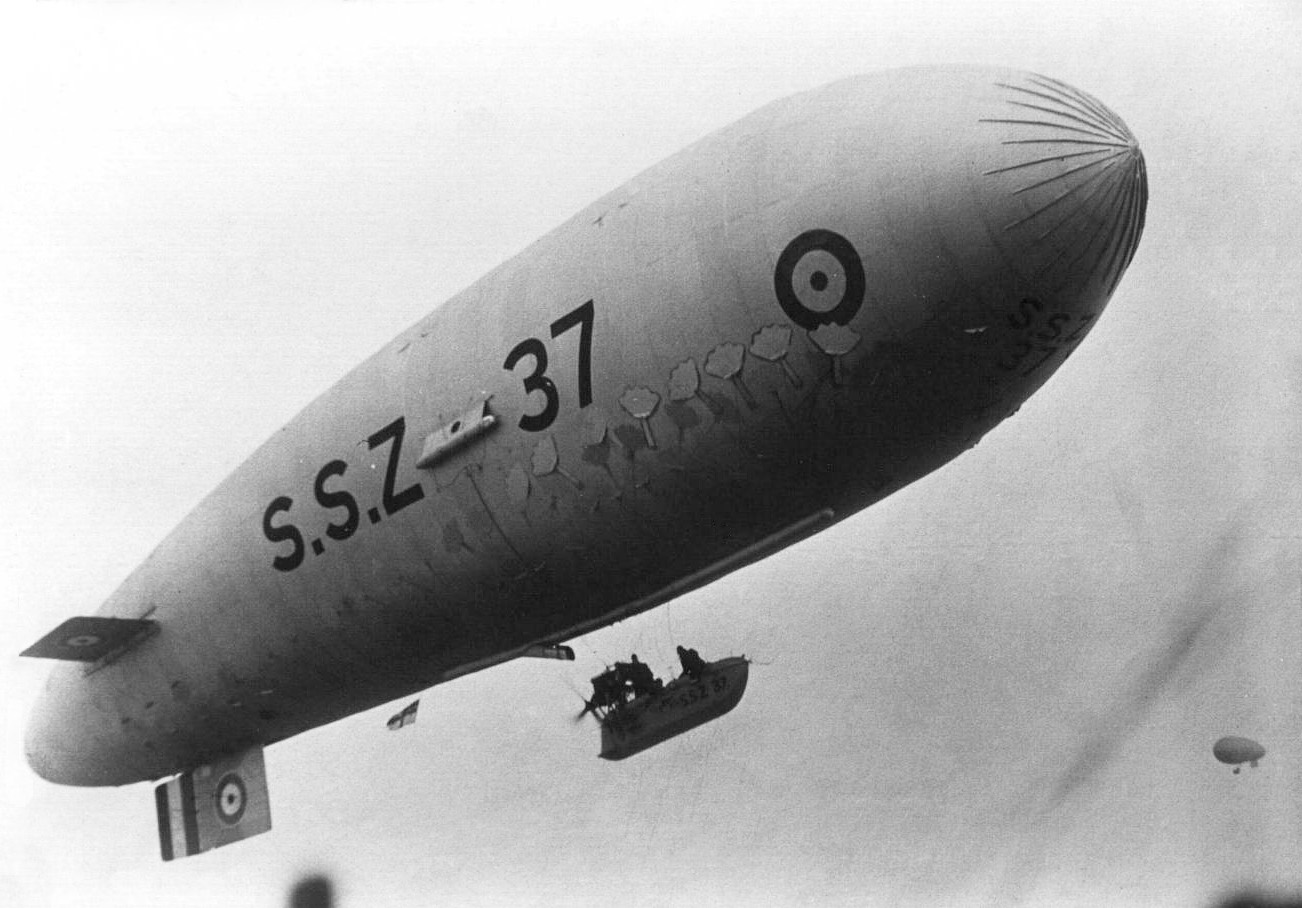
SSZ-37 a type designed at Capel

Following the successful repair to SS-10 at Capel production of the airships moved from Kingsnorth to Capel, although by 1916 production had moved again to Vickers at Barrow and RNAS Wormwood Scrubs. The engineering section at Capel went on to design an improved variant of the SS airship, which would be known as the SSZ. The SSZ had an improved aluminium covered ash-framed car and was fitted with a 75 hp Rolls-Royce Hawk aero-engine, it was fitted with a 70,000 cu ft (2,000 m^{3}) envelope and test flown in August 1916. When the Admiralty were informed about the new airship they censured the air station for carrying out unauthorised modifications, but on the other hand ordered the type into production.

== Operations ==
The airships carried out patrols along the English coast, and escorted shipping across the channel as a lookout for submarines. In April 1918, the Royal Air Force was formed and Capel became RAF Folkestone. By then it had three large airship sheds and a grass landing area. On 16 September 1918, while under the command of a United States Navy officer, SSZ.1 depth-charged and sank submarine UB-103.

Two sub-stations were used: at Godmersham Park north of Wye, and Wittersham south of Tenterden. The sites were used as mooring-out bases where airships could be secured in a sheltered area.

== Closure ==
Following the end of the First World War, the station closed during the summer of 1919. In the Second World War the site was used as a radio monitoring station.

== See also ==
- Battle of Britain Memorial, Capel-le-Ferne, on the other side of the village, is a memorial to the RAF aircrew of the Battle of Britain.
