= SST class airship =

World War I airship class

SST class

General information
- Type: Patrol airship
- National origin: United Kingdom
- Primary user: Royal Air Force
- Number built: 13

History
- Introduction date: June 1918

The SST (Sea Scout Twin) class of non-rigid airship or "blimp" was developed in Great Britain during World War I from the earlier SS class airship. The main role of these craft was to escort convoys and scout or search for German U-boats. A secondary purpose was to detect and destroy mines.

Designs were submitted in 1917 for a twin-engined SS class airship, the idea being that should there be an engine failure, the craft would not be rendered helpless and therefore less likely to be lost. The first submission was a failure, but the second showed promise and was put into production. Designated the SST class, the first of 13 examples entered service in June 1918, and the last in May 1919, three of which, S.S.T.9, 11 and 12 were purchased by the US Navy.

The SST used a larger 100,000 cu ft (2,800 m^{3}) envelope than any of the other SS class types, and was equipped with a streamlined and waterproofed car that could accommodate a crew of five. Two 100 hp (75 kW) Sunbeam or 75 hp (56 kW) Rolls-Royce Hawk engines were each mounted on a gantry either side of the car, and drove 9 ft (2.7 m) diameter four-bladed propellers in pusher configuration. At 57 mph (92 km/h), the SSTs had a greater top speed than all other SS class types, had the highest useful lift, and could stay airborne for up to two days. They were also cheaper to produce and easier to handle than the successful C Star class airship. Three SST were transferred to the Navy in June 1919. No Serial Numbers were assigned and there is no evidence they operated by the Navy. The 3 SST's were transferred to the Army in 1919-1920. The Army operated the SST's until late 1923 or early 1924.

Experiments involving SSTs were carried out at the end of the war; one notable example being SSE.3 (SS Experimental) that had an envelope design known as shape "U.271", the shape from which the hulls of both R100 and R101 were derived.

== Operators ==
United Kingdom

- Royal Naval Air Service / Royal Air Force

United States

- United States Army

== Specifications ==
Data from

General characteristics

- Crew: 5
- Length: 165 ft 0 in (50 m)
- Diameter: 35 ft 6 in (10.8 m)
- Height: 49 ft 0 in (15 m)
- Volume: 100,000 cu ft (2,800 m^{3})
- Useful lift: 2,240 lb (1,020 kg)
- Powerplant: 2 × Sunbeam , 100 hp (75 kW) each or
- Powerplant: 2 × Rolls-Royce Hawk , 75 hp (56 kW) each

Performance

- Maximum speed: 57 mph (92 km/h, 50 kn)
- Rate of climb: 1,200 ft/min (6.1 m/s)

== See also ==
- Comparative specifications for all SS class variants
- British blimps operated by the USN
- List of aircraft of the Royal Naval Air Service
