= SS class airship =

British airship

SS class
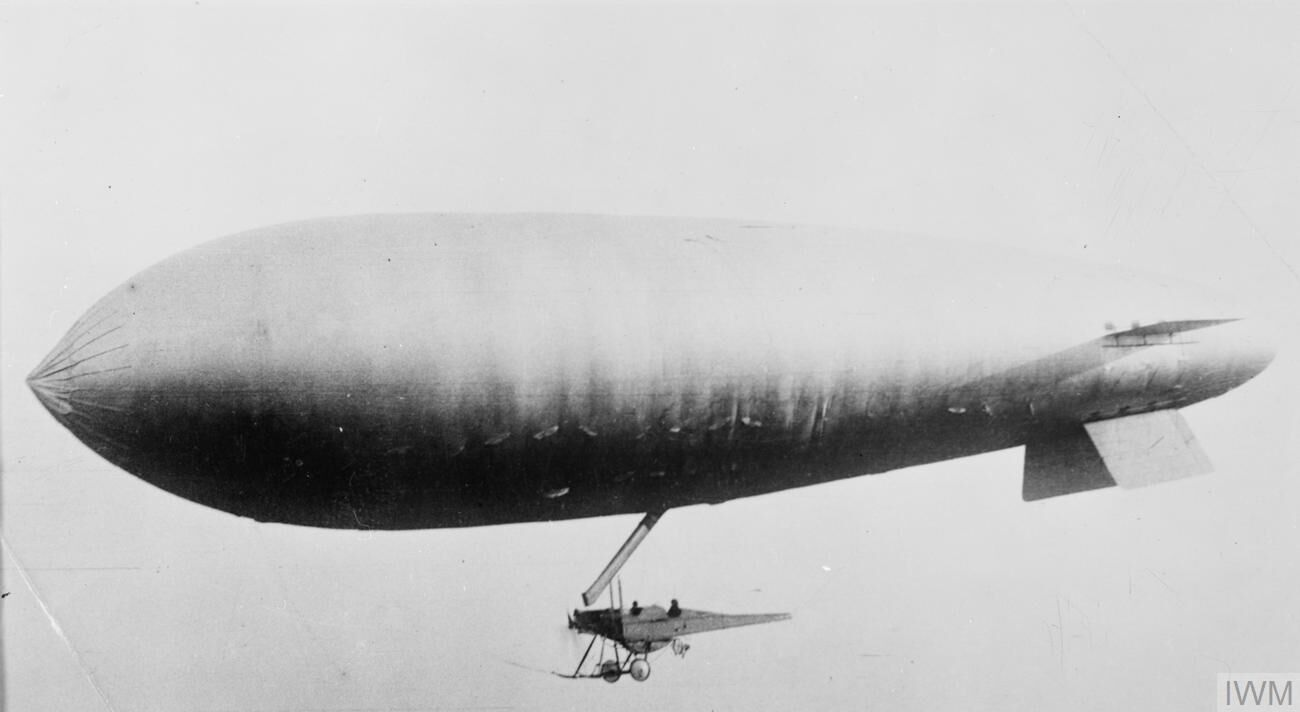
- An SS class airship using a B.E.2c fuselage as a gondola

General information
- Type: Patrol airship (submarine scout)
- National origin: United Kingdom
- Manufacturer: Royal Aircraft Factory; RNAS Kingsnorth; RNAS Capel; RNAS Wormwood Scrubs; Vickers
- Primary user: Royal Navy
- Number built: 60 original SS class (158 all variants)

History
- Introduction date: 18 March 1915
- First flight: 1915
- Variants: SSP, SSZ and SST class

SS (Submarine Scout or Sea Scout) class airships were simple, cheap and easily assembled small non-rigid airships or "blimps" that were developed as a matter of some urgency to counter the German U-boat threat to British shipping during World War I. A secondary purpose was to detect and destroy mines. The class proved to be versatile and effective, with a total of 158 being built in several versions.

== Requirement ==
Soon after the outbreak of World War I, the threat to British shipping from German submarines became increasingly apparent, with numerous losses occurring during October and November 1914. Then, on 4 February 1915, a communiqué issued by the Imperial German Admiralty declared that: "All the waters surrounding Great Britain and Ireland, are hereby declared to be a war zone. From 18 February onwards every enemy merchant vessel found within this war zone will be destroyed."

The situation had become critical and the Admiralty recognised that airships would be effective at spotting submarines and useful for Fleet observations, but at that time Britain's airship fleet consisted of just seven craft – four RNAS airships (HMA 17, 18, 19, and 20), two continental ships and a small Willows training craft – with only four airfields existing that possessed hangars capable of housing them. Consequently, on 28 February the First Sea Lord, Admiral Lord Fisher, called a meeting with Commander E. A. D. Masterman (Officer Commanding the Naval Airship Section) and representatives from Vickers and the London-based firm of Airships Limited to discuss the possibilities of creating a fleet of suitable patrol airships, sometimes referred to as "scouts".

== Design and development ==
The type was to have a speed of 40–50 mph (64–80 km/h), carry a crew of two, 160 lb (73 kg) of bombs, wireless equipment, fuel for eight hours flying, and capable of reaching an altitude of 5,000 ft (1,500 m). Most importantly the design had to be simple, in order to ease production and to facilitate training of the crews, since the new airships, designated the "Submarine Scout" or "Sea Scout" (SS) class, needed to be operational within weeks rather than months.

=== Prototype ===
The prototype SS craft was created at RNAS Kingsnorth on the Hoo Peninsula, and was effectively a B.E.2c aeroplane fuselage and engine minus wings, tailfin and elevators, slung below the disused envelope from airship HMA No. 2 (Willows No. 4) that had been lying deflated at the Royal Aircraft Establishment (RAE), Farnborough Airfield. It was ready for evaluation trials within a fortnight of approval being granted for the scheme, and on 18 March 1915 the first SS class airship entered service. The whole process had taken less than three weeks, and voicing his approval, Admiral Fisher made the famous comment: "Now I must have forty!"

The officer commanding the Kingsnorth facility was Wing-Commander N. F. Usborne, who also assisted in the design of the airship. In recognition of his contributions the following comment was made: "Admiral Sueter desires to place on record his high appreciation of the hard work and devotion to the airship cause displayed by Commander Usborne. Far into the night and the early hours of the morning this scientific officer worked to make these airships a success and due to him in large part their wonderful success was due."

Two private firms, Armstrong Whitworth and Airships Ltd., were also invited to submit designs and consequently three versions of the SS class blimp were produced: the SS "B.E.2c", the SS "Armstrong Whitworth" and the SS "Maurice Farman" (thus named because the car designed by Airships Ltd. resembled a Farman aeroplane body).

=== Envelope ===
The envelope of the experimental prototype had a volume of 20,500 ft^{3} (580 m^{3}) of hydrogen gas, but production models used a 60,000 ft^{3} (1,700 m^{3}) envelope of similar shape that provided a typical gross lift of 4,180 lb (1,900 kg), a net lift of 1,434 lb (650 kg) and a disposable lift of 659 lb (299 kg) with full fuel tanks and a crew of two on board. Each of the SS versions used similar envelopes that were composed of four layers: two of rubber-proofed fabric with a layer of rubber between them, and a further rubber layer on the inner, or gas surface. The external surface had five coats of dope applied to it to protect it from the elements and to render the envelope completely gastight. The first two coats were of "Delta dope" (a flexible dope used for the first time in 1913 on the British Army semi-rigid airship Delta), followed by two of aluminium dope and finally one of aluminium varnish. To stiffen the nose of the envelope and to prevent it blowing in, 24 canes were arranged radially from its centre and covered with an aluminium cap.

The envelope contained two ballonets of 6,375 ft^{3} (180.5 m^{3}) each instead of just one as used on the prototype. These were supplied with air from the propeller draught via a scoop and a slanting aluminium tube to the underside of the envelope, and then via horizontal fabric hoses containing non-return fabric valves known as "crab-pots".

=== Planes ===
The original design featured four fins (or planes) and rudders set radially to the envelope: two horizontal fins, and two below the envelope in an inverted V-tail configuration; however, in some cases the two lower fins were replaced with a single central fin that carried a larger rudder. The fins were identical in size and shape, and were constructed of spruce, aluminium, and steel tubing, braced with wire and covered with doped fabric.

=== Versions ===
==== SS B.E.2c ====
Similar to the prototype, the production car was a wingless B.E.2c fuselage stripped of various fittings, and equipped with two ash skids in place of the wheeled undercarriage. Mounted at the front of the car was an air-cooled 75 hp (56 kW) Renault engine driving a 9 ft (2.7 m) diameter four-bladed propeller.

The pilot was seated behind the observer, who also served as the wireless operator. A camera was fitted, and the armament consisted of bombs carried in frames suspended about the centre of the undercarriage and a Lewis Gun mounted on a post adjacent to the pilot's seat. The bomb sight and release mechanism were located on the outside of the car on the starboard side of the pilot's position.

==== SS Maurice Farman ====
The Airships Ltd. design initially used 60,000 ft^{3} (1,700 m^{3}), and later 70,000 ft^{3} (2,000 m^{3}) envelopes. Dual controls were fitted for the pilot and the observer/wireless operator. Occasionally a third seat was fitted to carry a passenger or an engineer. Renault engines were normally fitted, mounted at the rear of the car in pusher configuration, but a Rolls-Royce Hawk proved effective in one instance. The type was slightly slower than the SS B.E.2c, but the cars were roomier and more comfortable.

==== SS Armstrong Whitworth ====
The version fitted with the Armstrong Whitworth F.K. car was similar in many respects to the B.E.2c type, but had a single-skid landing gear with buffers, and required the larger 70,000 ft^{3} (2,000 m^{3}) envelope to maintain a reasonable margin of lift. A water-cooled 100 hp (75 kW) Green engine was fitted in tractor configuration, and fuel was carried in two aluminium tanks supported in fabric slings suspended from the envelope, saving 100 lb (45 kg) in weight compared to the internal tanks fitted to the B.E.2c.

=== Airship stations ===
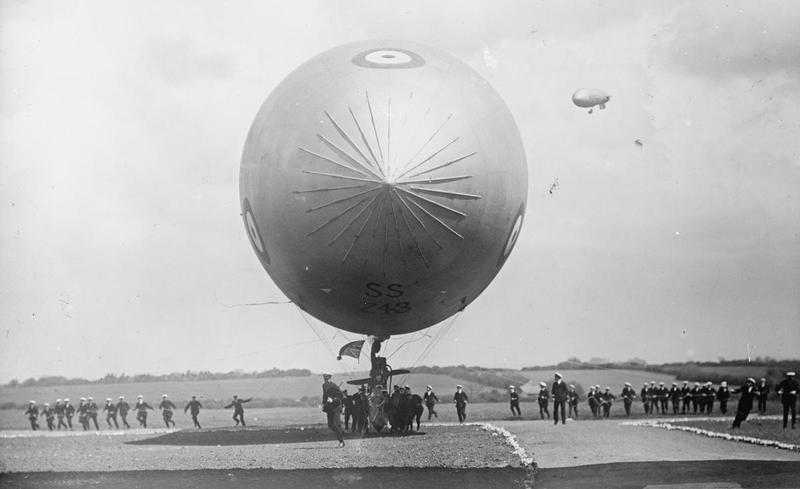
An SS airship lands after a patrol, showing the large crew required for handling on the ground. Another SS airship can be seen in the air.

At the same time a number of new air stations were set up as well as a training station at Cranwell. The rigid airship programme was also gathering momentum, and these stations were later joined by several more that together formed a chain all around the UK coast.

== Production ==
Initially undertaken by the Royal Aircraft Factory at Farnborough, production was soon transferred to Kingsnorth, and in addition shortly afterwards to Vickers' works at Barrow-in-Furness and to the Wormwood Scrubs Naval Air Station in London. However, construction at each of the facilities was hampered by aeroplane orders affecting the supply of envelopes.

In total, some 60 examples of the three versions of SS class blimp were assembled, costing around £2,500 each (equivalent to £120,000 in 2025, when adjusted for inflation).

== Service history and legacy ==
During the final 15 months of the war SS type airships carried out over 10,000 patrols, flying nearly one-and-a-half million miles in more than 50,000 hours. A total of 49 U-boats were sighted, 27 of which were attacked from the air or by ships. In all, there was only one instance of a ship being sunk whilst being escorted by an airship.

An SS B.E.2c set the current altitude record for a British airship when it reached 10,300 ft (3,100 m) in the summer of 1916, and the sole Hawk-engined SS Maurice Farman on one occasion carried out an extended patrol of 18 hours 20 minutes. Also in the summer of 1916, an Armstrong Whitworth model coated with black dope carried out night-time operations over France, proving that airships could be of value when operating with military forces over land.

The SS type was further developed with purpose-built cars to create the SSP (Pusher), SSZ (Zero), SST (Twin) and SSE (Experimental SST) types. A grand total of 158 of all versions and variants were constructed, some of which were acquired by France, Italy and the United States.

Although the SS class types proved invaluable, their use was restricted to coastal patrols in reasonably fair weather owing to their low engine power and comparatively small size. For work farther out at sea and in all weathers, three further classes were developed: the Coastal, the C* and North Sea-class ships. Each had larger engines and envelopes, carried more crew, and had greater patrol duration than the previous class ships.

== Operators ==
France

- French Air Force

Kingdom of Italy

- Italian Air Force

Japan

- The Imperial Japanese Navy acquired an SS-3 from the Royal Navy in 1921; it exploded in a hangar at Yokosuka Naval Base in 1922, just weeks after its maiden flight in Japan. The IJN then completed a domestically-produced replica in 1923, which flew once from Yokosuka to Osaka and back to Kasumigaura Air Field; it exploded in midair in 1924, killing all of its crew.

United Kingdom

- Royal Navy

United States

- United States Navy

== Specifications (typical) ==
Data from

General characteristics

- Length: 143 ft 5 in (43.7 m)
- Diameter: 27 ft 9 in (8.5 m)
- Height: 43 ft 9 in (13.3 m)
- Volume: 60,000 cu ft (1,700 m^{3})
- Powerplant: 1 × Green/Renault/Rolls-Royce , 75 hp (56 kW)

Performance

- Maximum speed: 50 mph (80 km/h, 43 kn)
- Service ceiling: 5,000 ft (1,500 m)

Armament

- 160 lb (73 kg) bombs
- Lewis Gun

=== Comparative specifications ===
General characteristics	SS ^{[BE]}	SS ^{[MF]}	SS ^{[AW]}	SSP	SSZ	SST
Length	143 ft 5 in (43.71 m)	143 ft 5 in (43.71 m)	143 ft 5 in (43.71 m)	143 ft 5 in (43.71 m)	143 ft 5 in (43.71 m)	165 ft (50 m)
Diameter	27 ft 9 in (8.46 m)	30 / 32 ft	32 ft (9.8 m)	30 ft (9.1 m)	30 ft (9.1 m)	35 ft 6 in (10.82 m)
Height	43 ft 5 in (13.23 m)	43 ft 5 in (13.23 m)	43 ft 5 in (13.23 m)	43 ft 5 in (13.23 m)	46 ft (14 m)	49 ft (15 m)
Volume	60,000 ft^{3} (1,700 m^{3})	60 / 70,000 ft^{3} (2,000 m^{3})	70,000 ft^{3} (2,000 m^{3})	70,000 ft^{3} (2,000 m^{3})	70,000 ft^{3} (2,000 m^{3})	100,000 ft^{3} (2,800 m^{3})
Ballonet	12,750 ft^{3} (361 m^{3})	12,750 / 19,600 ft^{3} (560 m^{3})	19,600 ft^{3} (560 m^{3})	19,600 ft^{3} (560 m^{3})	19,600 ft^{3} (560 m^{3})	19,600 ft^{3} (560 m^{3})
Gross lift	1.85 t	2.2 t	2.2 t	2.2 t	2.2 t	3.1 t
Disposable lift	0.64 t	0.6 / ~0.8 t	0.7 t	0.7 t	0.6 t	1.0 t
Car length	24 ft (7.3 m)	20 ft (6.1 m)	26 ft (7.9 m)	26 ft (7.9 m)	17 ft 6 in (5.33 m)	17 ft 6 in (5.33 m)
Engine type	Renault	Renault	Green	Rolls-Royce/Green	Rolls-Royce	Rolls-Royce/Sunbeam
Engine power	70 / 75 hp	75 hp (56 kW)	100 hp (75 kW)	75 / 100 hp	75 hp (56 kW)	75 / 100 hp
Fuel capacity	60 gal	64 gal	90 gal	120 gal	120 gal	120 gal
Performance						
Maximum speed	50 / 52 mph	40 mph (64 km/h)	45 mph (72 km/h)	52 mph (84 km/h)	53 mph (85 km/h)	57 mph (92 km/h)
Endurance (full speed)	7–8 hours	7–8 hours	12 hours	12 hours	17 hours	17 hours
Endurance (half speed)	14–16 hours	14–16 hours	24 hours	24 hours		
Rate of climb	700 ft/min	790 ft/min	500 ft/min	500 ft/min	1,200 ft/min	1,200 ft/min

_{Notes: · [BE] B.E.2c car · [MF] Farman car · [AW] Armstrong Whitworth car}

== See also ==
- British blimps operated by the USN
- List of aircraft of the Royal Naval Air Service
- List of British airships
