= Astra-Torres airship =

Non-rigid airships built by Société Astra in France

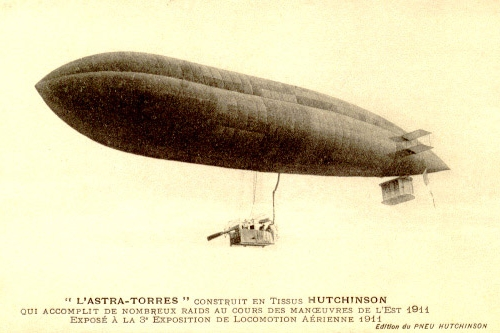
Astra-Torres AT-1 at an air show in 1911

The Astra-Torres airships were non-rigid airships built by Société Astra in France between about 1908 and 1922 to a design by the Spaniard Leonardo Torres Quevedo in 1902. They had a highly characteristic tri-lobed cross-section rather than the more usual circular cross-section. This was the result of moving most of the blimp's bracing wires inside the envelope in an attempt to minimise drag. Early Astra-Torres airships could be trimmed by moving the entire gondola fore and aft.

Astra-Torres airships, like Alsace, were used by the French Navy during the First World War and for a few years before and after. A few of these were transferred to the American expeditionary forces in Europe, and AT-1, AT-13 and AT-17 were eventually taken back to the United States.

Britain's Royal Naval Air Service purchased AT-14, AT-17 and AT-19, these becoming HMA No. 3, HMA No. 8 and HMA No. 16 respectively. They went through testing and evaluation at RNAS Kingsnorth before all were later taken out of service in May 1916, although the Astra-Torres design was imitated in Britain's own Coastal class, and North Sea blimps that served through to the end of the war.

After the war, AT-16 was operated by Transaérienne, carrying sightseeing passengers over Paris, and AT-24 was purchased by the Japanese Navy.

== Operators ==
France

- French Navy

Japan

- Imperial Japanese Navy - The IJN purchased a Nieuport AT-2 from France in 1922, shortly after losing its first airship, a British SS class airship, in an explosion. It was assembled at Tokorozawa in 1923 and stationed at Kasumigaura Air Base later that year. It was dismantled in 1924.

United Kingdom

- Royal Naval Air Service

== See also ==
- 1911 in aviation
