= Capel-le-Ferne =

Village in Kent, England

Coordinates: 51.1037°N 1.2016°E

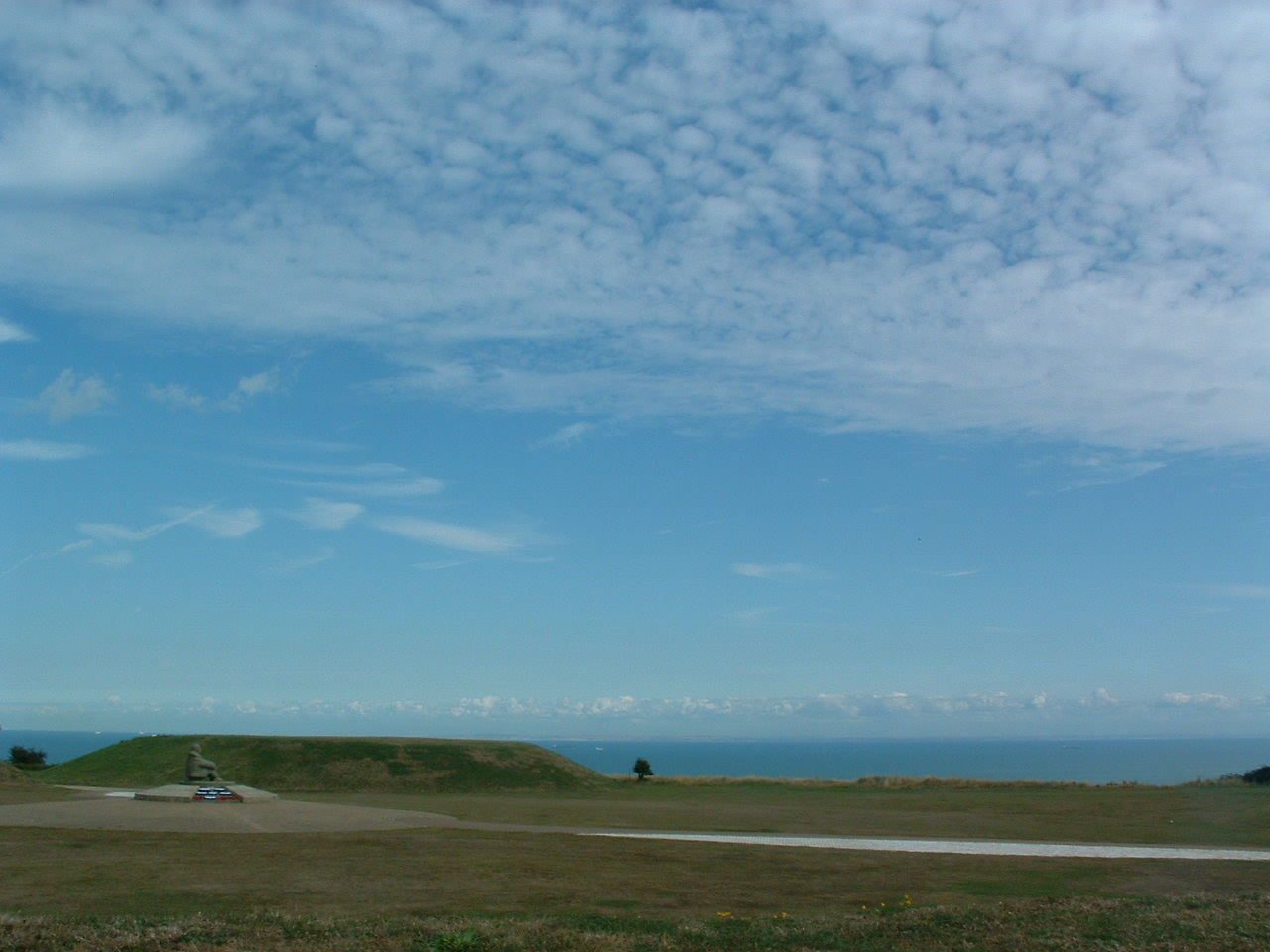
- The memorial to The Few at Capel-le-Ferne

- Location within Kent
- Population: 1,884 (2011)
- OS grid reference: TR242386
- District: Dover
- Shire county: Kent
- Region: South East
- Country: England
- Sovereign state: United Kingdom
- Post town: Folkestone
- Postcode district: CT18
- Dialling code: 01303
- Police: Kent
- Fire: Kent
- Ambulance: South East Coast
- UK Parliament: Dover and Deal

Capel-le-Ferne /ˌkeɪpəl lə ˈfɜːrn/ is a village and civil parish on the White Cliffs of Dover, near Folkestone in the Dover district, in Kent, England. Its name derives from a medieval French term meaning "chapel in the ferns".

Its foremost attraction is the Battle of Britain Memorial, opened by the Queen Mother on 9 July 1993 and dedicated to those who fought in the battle. The Memorial is built upon part of a coastal battery (No. 2 and No. 3 guns) used during the Second World War (the other part of the battery site is privately owned and is under restoration).

In 2011 the parish had a population of 1 884. The village is twinned with the commune of Oye-Plage, which is 11 km/7 miles east of Calais, France.

== Transport ==
The New Dover Road, also known as the B2011, runs through the village. The A20/E15 runs to the north, and is used by freight and ferry traffic heading for Dover. The Channel Tunnel runs underneath the northernmost part of the village.

== Governance ==
The electoral ward of Capel-le-Ferne includes Hougham Without and at the 2011 census it had a population of 2,347.

== In popular culture ==
Russell Hoban gave Capel-le-Fern the name "Crippel the Farn" in his post-apocalyptic novel Riddley Walker (1989).

== See also ==
- RNAS Capel a first world war airship station to the east of the village
- St Mary's Church, Capel-le-Ferne
- Listed buildings in Capel-le-Ferne
Battle of Britain Memorial

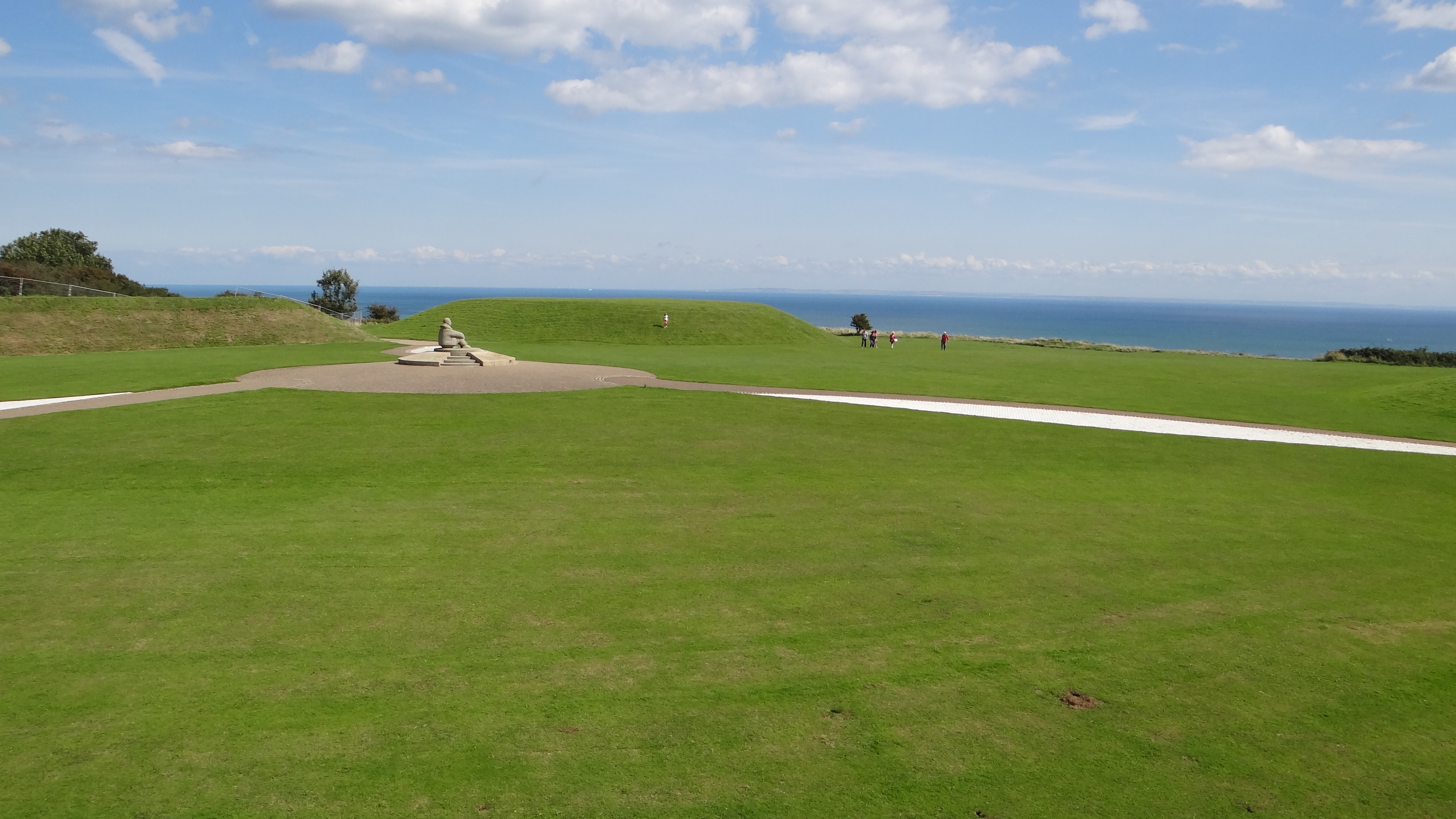

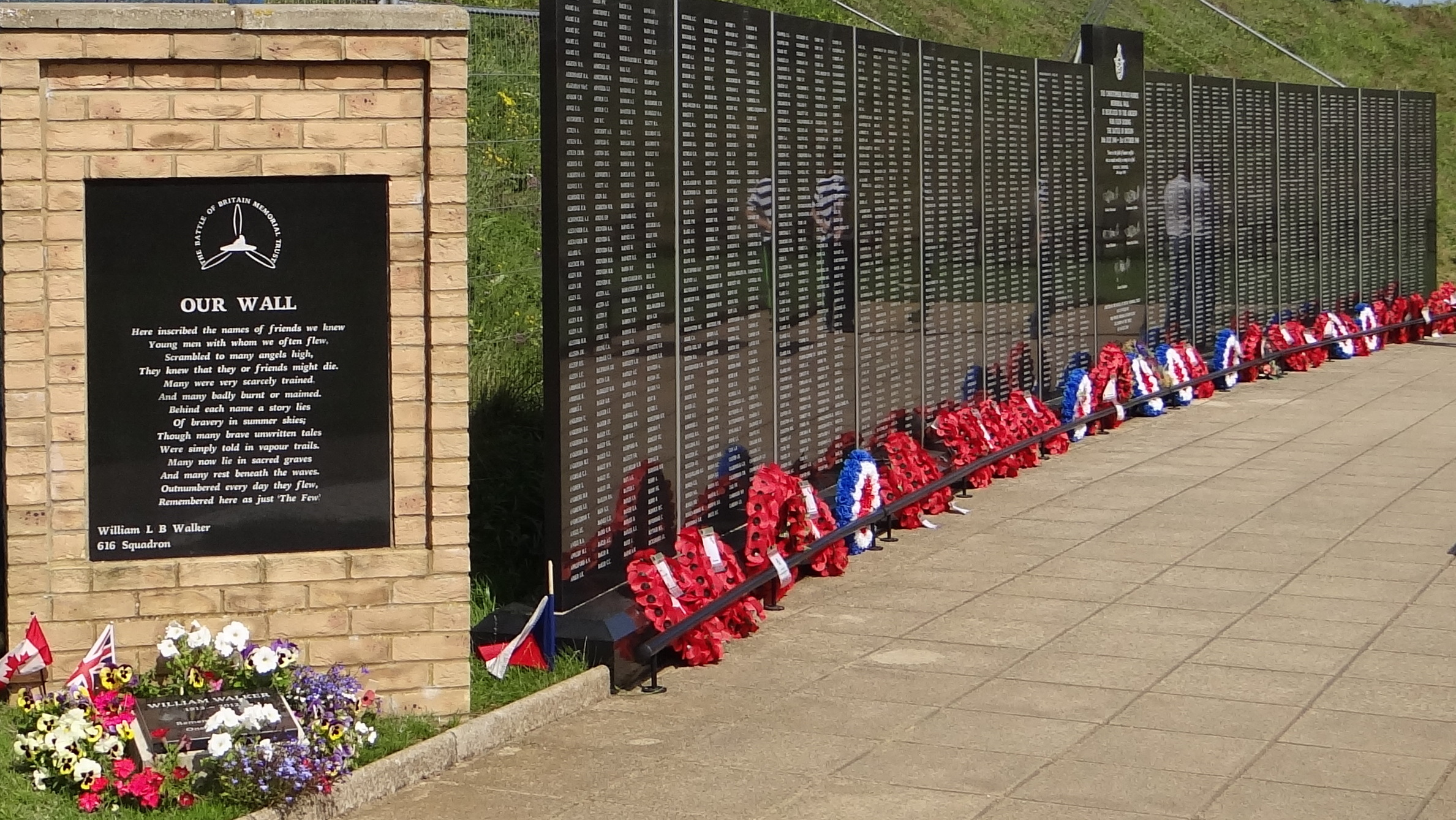
Memorial Wall

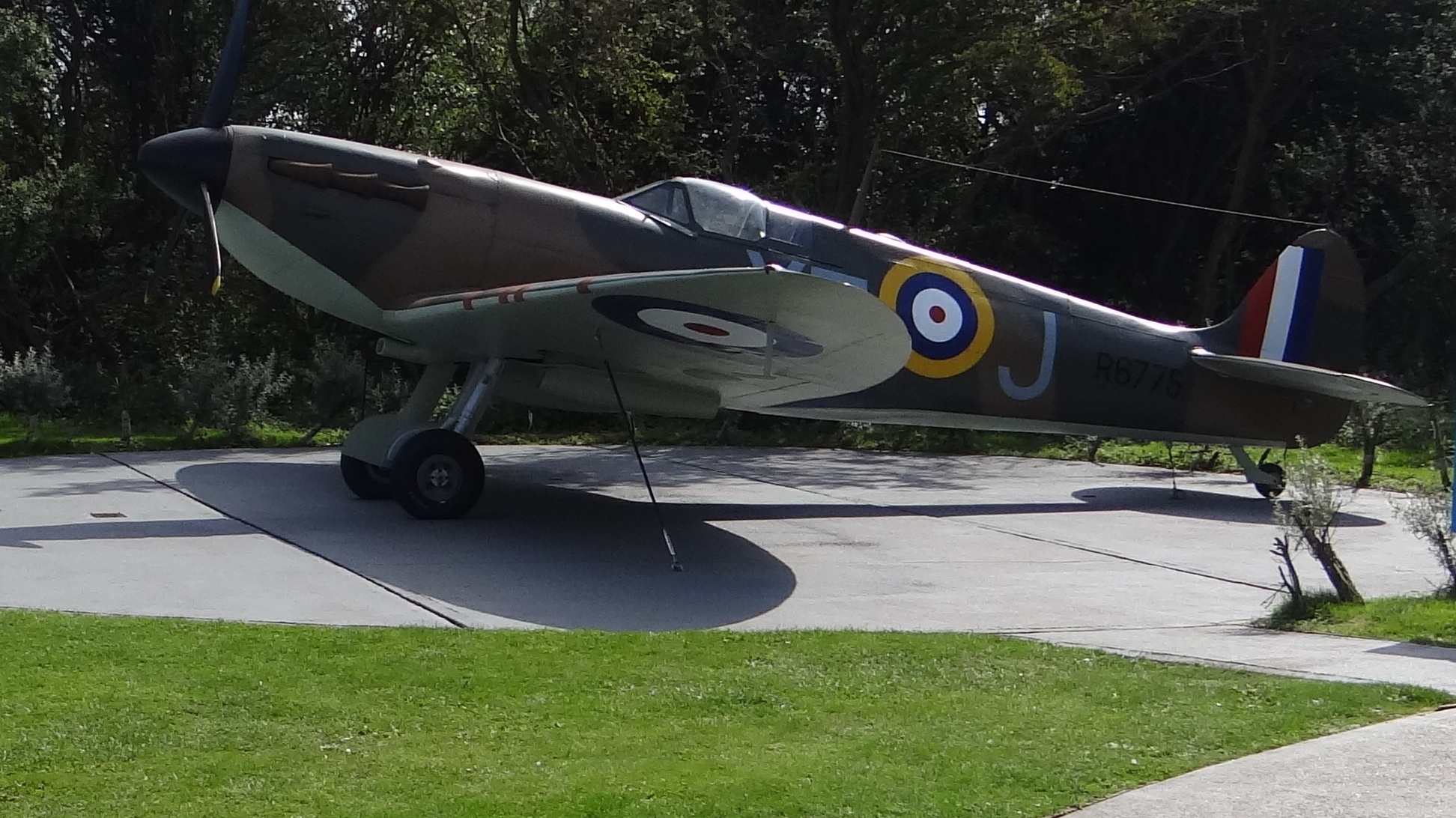
Spitfire Replica
