= British blimps operated by the USN =

British blimps operated by the United States Navy

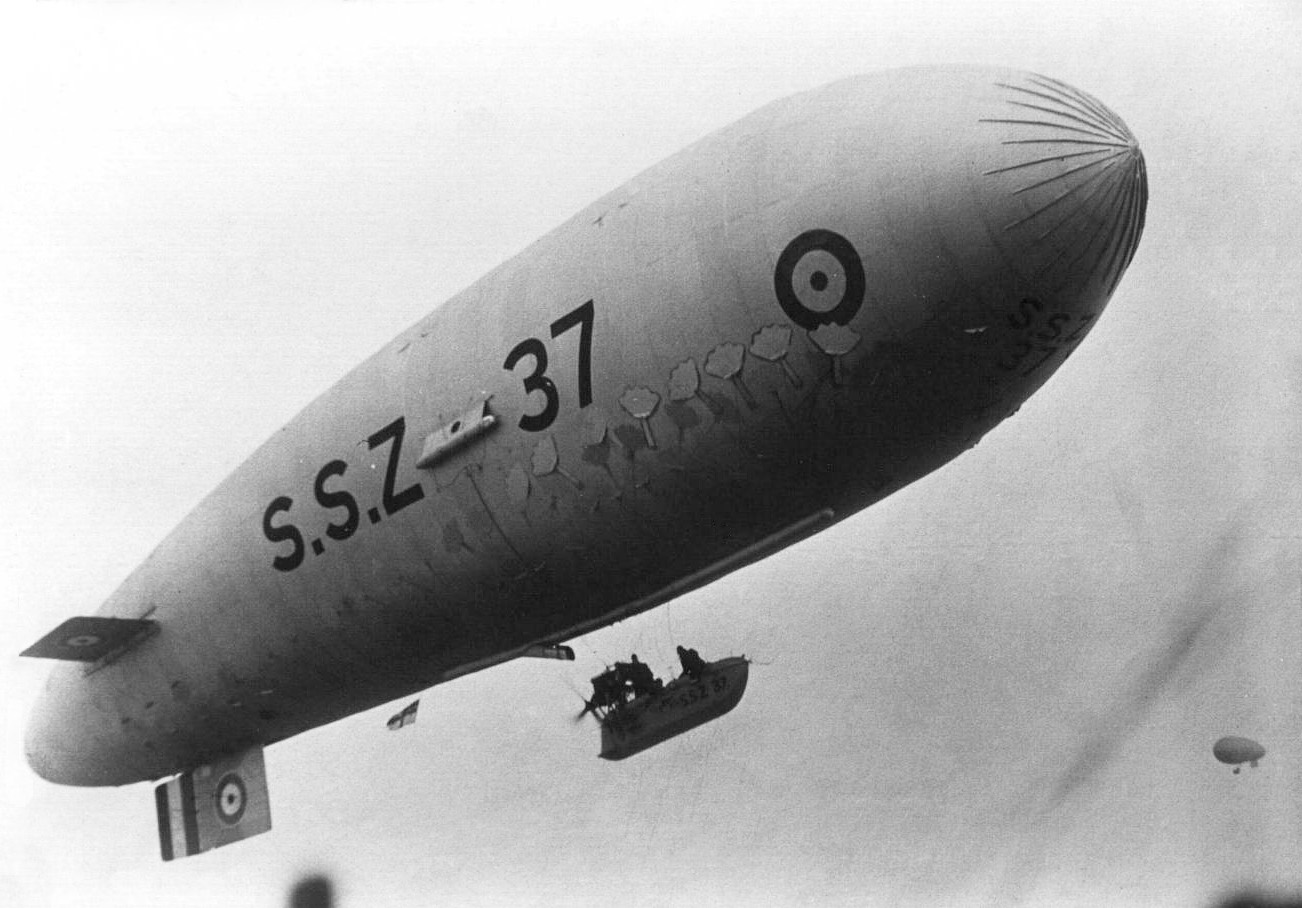
The SSZ class 37

During the First World War, the United States Navy trained crews at British bases, and operated British designed and built blimps on combat patrols. The Navy purchased three types of British blimps. Operations were flown in a US SSZ and airships operated by the Royal Navy.

== SSZ class ==
The US Navy purchased two SSZ class blimps, which were 142 feet (43 m) long, 32 feet (9.8 m) in diameter and had a volume of 70,000 cubic feet (2,000 m^{3}). They were propelled by a single 75 hp (56 kW) Rolls-Royce Hawk engine. A replacement SSZ-23 was acquired in November 1917 and first operated from Cranwell for training. It was then assigned patrol duties from RNAS Howden. These operations included at least 24 operational missions in the spring of 1918. Ensign Phillip Barnes received the Distinguished Flying Cross from King George V during one of those flights. The SSZ-23 then was transferred to Lowthorpe and completed another 24 operational flights by August, when it returned to Howden where it was destroyed in an accident. While preparing to mate the old SSZ-23 envelope to a spare control car, the US maintenance crew started a fire which burned the SSZ-23, SSZ-38, SSZ-54 as well as the rigid airship R27. A replacement airship, also designated SSZ-23 was acquired on 22 November 1917 and was eventually shipped to the United States and erected at Cape May in early February 1919. Served at Cape May until April of that year and was stricken from the Navy registry in June 1920. The SSZ-24 was assembled and tested by the Navy and Goodyear in March 1918. It was shipped to Hampton Roads. There are no records of any operations at Hampton Roads. The SSZ-24 may have been burned in the summer of 1918.

== North Sea class ==
The US Navy purchased one North Sea class airship. N.S.14 was sold to the US in early November 1918 after flying 206 hours in British service and the USN designation NS-1. NS-1 was shipped to Wingfoot Lake, and then Hampton Roads, but there is no record it was ever flown while owned by the US Navy. North Sea blimps were 260 feet (79 m) long, had a diameter of 57 feet (17 m) and a volume of 360,000 cubic feet (10,000 m^{3}). They had a top speed of 57 mph (92 km/h), an endurance of 24 hours and were powered by two 250 hp (190 kW) Rolls-Royce Eagle engines or two 240 hp (180 kW) Fiat engines.

== SST class ==
The US Navy purchased three SST (Sea Scout Twin) airships from Britain in 1919. The SST-9, SST-11 and SST-12 were transferred to the USN; the Navy designations were probably to be SST-1, 2, and 3. The three SSTs were transferred directly to the US Army and operated by that service between 1920 and the winter of 1923–24.

SST class airships were 165 feet (50 m) long, 35 feet 6 inches (10.82 m) in diameter and had a top speed of 57 mph (92 km/h). They were powered by two engines, either 100 hp (75 kW) Sunbeam or 75 hp (56 kW) Rolls-Royce Hawks, and carried a crew of five.
