= Kasumigaura Air Field =

Military airport in Kasumigaura, Japan

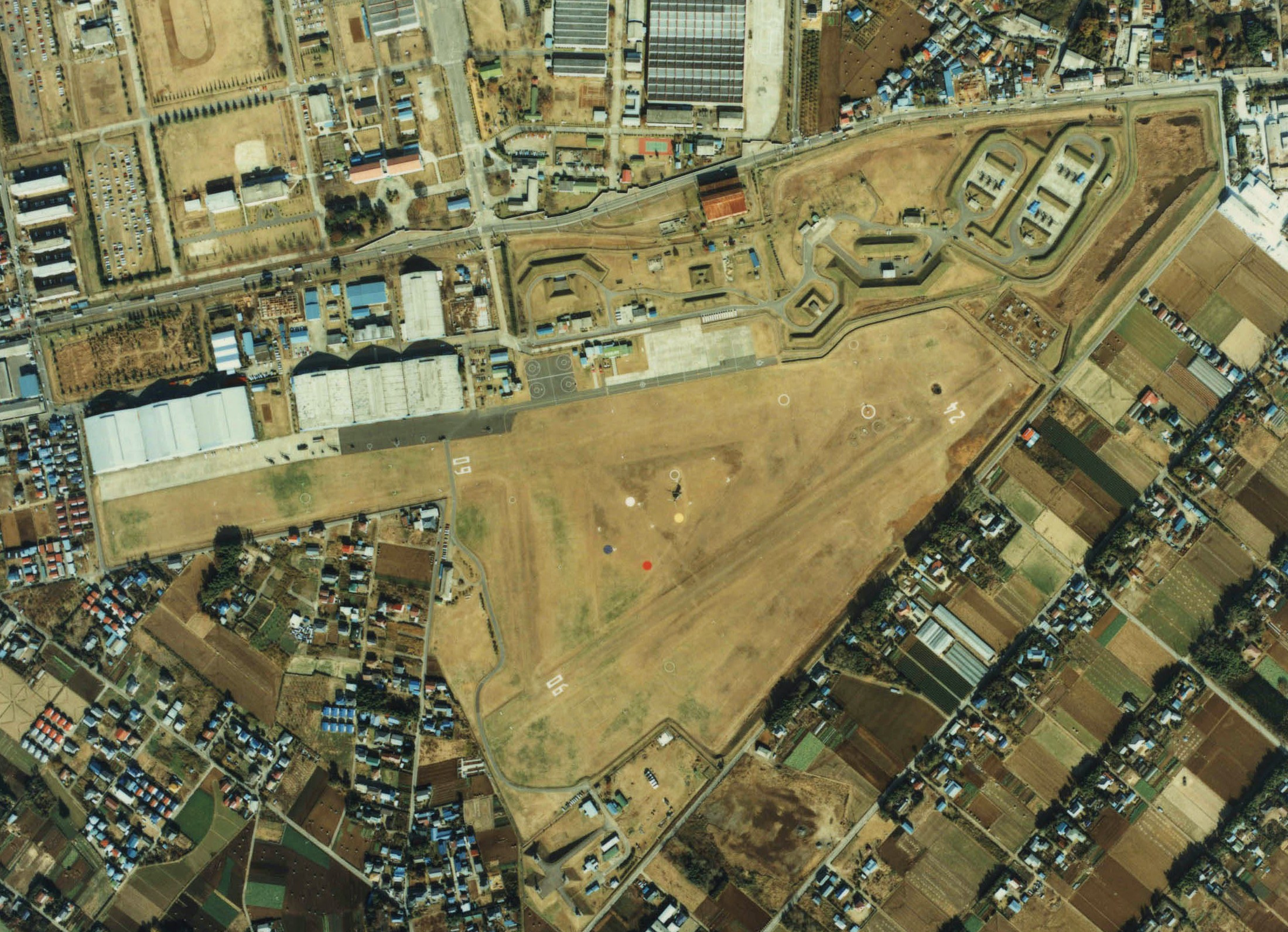
- IATA: none; ICAO: RJAK

Summary
- Airport type: Military
- Operator: Japan Ground Self-Defense Force
- Location: Kasumigaura, Japan
- Elevation AMSL: 85 ft / 26 m
- Coordinates: 36°02′05″N 140°11′34″E

Map
- Location in Japan

Runways
Direction	Length		Surface
Direction	m	ft	Surface
06/24	550	1,804	Sod and roll
- Source: Japanese AIP at AIS Japan

Kasumigaura Air Field (霞ヶ浦飛行場, Kasumigaura Hikōjō; ICAO: RJAK) is a military aerodrome of the Japan Ground Self-Defense Force Camp Kasumigaura (霞ヶ浦駐屯地, Kasumigaura Chūtonchi), 2.7 NM (5.0 km; 3.1 mi) south of Tsuchiura in Ibaraki Prefecture, Japan.

== History ==
The base was established in 1921 as the Imperial Japanese Navy Aeronautical Technology and Training Center (海軍航空技術講習所). In 1923 Japan, which had fought with the allies, received the German airship hangar from Jüterbog airbase as part of its war reparations, and the hangar was installed at Kasumigaura air base. On 19 August 1929, the airship LZ-17 Graf Zeppelin stopped at Kasumigaura for several days while on its round-the-world trip. The Zeppelin visit made Tsuchiura famous throughout Japan for its potato-based curry.

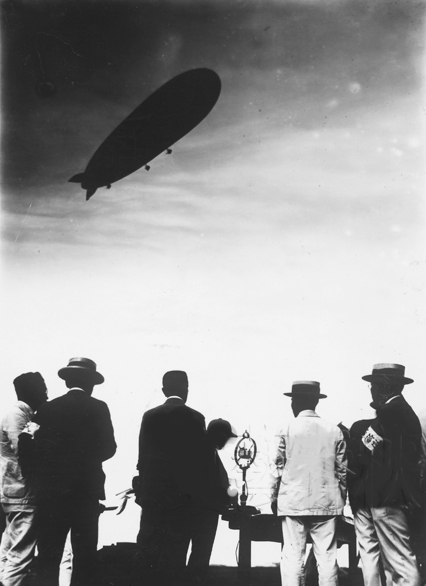
LZ 127 Graf Zeppelin arriving in Kasumi-ga-Ura

The IJN ordered an Astra-Torres airship from France in 1922 and stationed it at Kasumigaura from 1923, alongside a Japanese-built Vickers SS-3; both of these airships left service around 1924. Kasumigaura later hosted three Fujikura airships and one Nobile airship between 1927 and 1932, at which point the Navy ceased airship operations and dismantled its fleet. The airship hangar was dismantled in 1943.

The U.S. military took over the base in 1945 and handed it over to the Japanese defense ministry in 1953. Since then it has been used as a supply depot and as a training base for helicopter pilots and mechanics, with approximately 2,000 personnel stationed on base.
