= Alsace (airship) =

General information
- Role: reconnaissance/bomber
- National origin: France
- Manufacturer: Société Astra
- Service: French Navy

History
- Last flight: 2 October 1915
- Fate: Destroyed after taking AA fire

The Alsace was a French Astra-Torres airship that flew a number of reconnaissance and bombing missions before being shot down by Imperial German fire on 2 October 1915.

== Service ==
On the night of 30 September and 1 October 1915, the Alsace bombarded the junction of Amagne-Lucquy, and the stations of Attigny and Vouziers on railways that went through Luxemburg and the Ardennes. While on a 2 October 1915 bombing mission the airship took German FLAK fire and crashed in the forests near Rethel, France. The crew, consisting of Lt Lieutenant Maurice Cohen, Capt Thierry, Lt Tabry, Chogenard and Gongland, were captured by the Germans.

== Specifications ==
General characteristics

- Length: 89.91 m (295 ft 0 in)
- Volume: 23,000 m^{3} (810,000 cu ft) hydrogen
- Propellers: propellers
