= Listed buildings in Capel-le-Ferne =

Civil Parish in Kent, England

Capel-le-Ferne is a village and civil parish in the Dover District of Kent, England. It contains three listed buildings that are recorded in the National Heritage List for England. Of these one is grade I and two are grade II.

This list is based on the information retrieved online from Historic England.

== Key ==
| Grade | Criteria |
|---|---|
| I | Buildings that are of exceptional interest |
| II* | Particularly important buildings of more than special interest |
| II | Buildings that are of special interest |

== Listing ==
| Name | Grade | Location | Type | Completed (Note: The date given is the date used by Historic England as significant for the initial building or that of an important part in the structure's description.) | Date designated | Grid ref. (Note: The grid reference is based on the British national grid reference system, sometimes known as OSGB36, used by the Ordnance Survey.) Geo-coordinates | Notes | Entry number (Note: The "List Entry Number" is a unique number assigned to each listed building and scheduled monument by Historic England.) | Image | Wikidata |
|---|---|---|---|---|---|---|---|---|---|---|
| Row of 10 Headstones About 1 to 20 Metres South of Church of St Mary | II | | | | 28 May 1987 | TR2571240006; 51°06′54″N 1°13′25″E | | 1363355 | Upload Photo | Q26645186 |
| Two Headstones About 10 Metres South of Church of St Mary | II | | | | 28 May 1987 | TR2571840007; 51°06′54″N 1°13′25″E | | 1070048 | Upload Photo | Q26323580 |
| Church of St Mary | I | | church building | | 22 August 1962 | TR2571140018; 51°06′54″N 1°13′25″E | | 1070047 | Church of St Mary More images | Q7594294 |

== See also ==
- Grade I listed buildings in Kent
- Grade II* listed buildings in Kent

== Sources ==
- Newman, John (2013) [1969], Kent: North-East and East, The Buildings of England, New Haven and London: Yale University Press, ISBN 978-0-300-18506-5
