= SSP class airship =

SSP class

General information
- Type: Patrol airship
- National origin: United Kingdom
- Primary user: Royal Navy
- Number built: 6

History
- Introduction date: 1917

The SSP (Submarine Scout Pusher) were a class of Royal Navy non-rigid airship or "blimp" developed by the United Kingdom during World War I as a successor to the earlier SS class airship. Found to be inferior to a parallel development, the Submarine Scout Zero non-rigid, only a few were built. The main role of these craft was to escort convoys and scout or search for German U-boats.

== Design and development ==
In 1916, design commenced at RNAS Kingsnorth on an SS class -type airship that would have a more comfortable purpose-built car, and not simply be an adaptation of an aeroplane fuselage. The SSP cars were of rectangular cross-section, had a blunt nose, and could accommodate a crew of three.

As the name suggests, the SSP was powered by a 100 hp (75 kW) Green engine mounted on bearers to the rear of the car, powering a 9 ft (2.7 m) diameter four-bladed propeller in pusher configuration. Four examples of the type were later fitted with 75 hp (56 kW) Rolls-Royce Hawk engines.

Six SSPs entered service between January and June 1917, but because of the success of the SSZ type it was decided that these would become the standard SS variant, and the SSP programme was terminated.

== Operators ==
Royal Navy

== Specifications ==
Data from

General characteristics

- Crew: 3
- Length: 143 ft 5 in (43.7 m)
- Diameter: 30 ft 0 in (9.1 m)
- Height: 43 ft 5 in (13.2 m)
- Volume: 70,000 cu ft (2,000 m^{3})
- Useful lift: 1,570 lb (710 kg)
- Powerplant: 1 × Green , 100 hp (75 kW) or
- Powerplant: 1 × Rolls-Royce Hawk , 75 hp (56 kW)

Performance

- Maximum speed: 52 mph (84 km/h, 45 kn)
- Endurance: 24 hours
- Rate of climb: 500 ft/min (2.5 m/s)

== See also ==
- Comparative specifications for all SS class variants
- List of aircraft of the Royal Naval Air Service
