= C Star class airship =

C-Star class
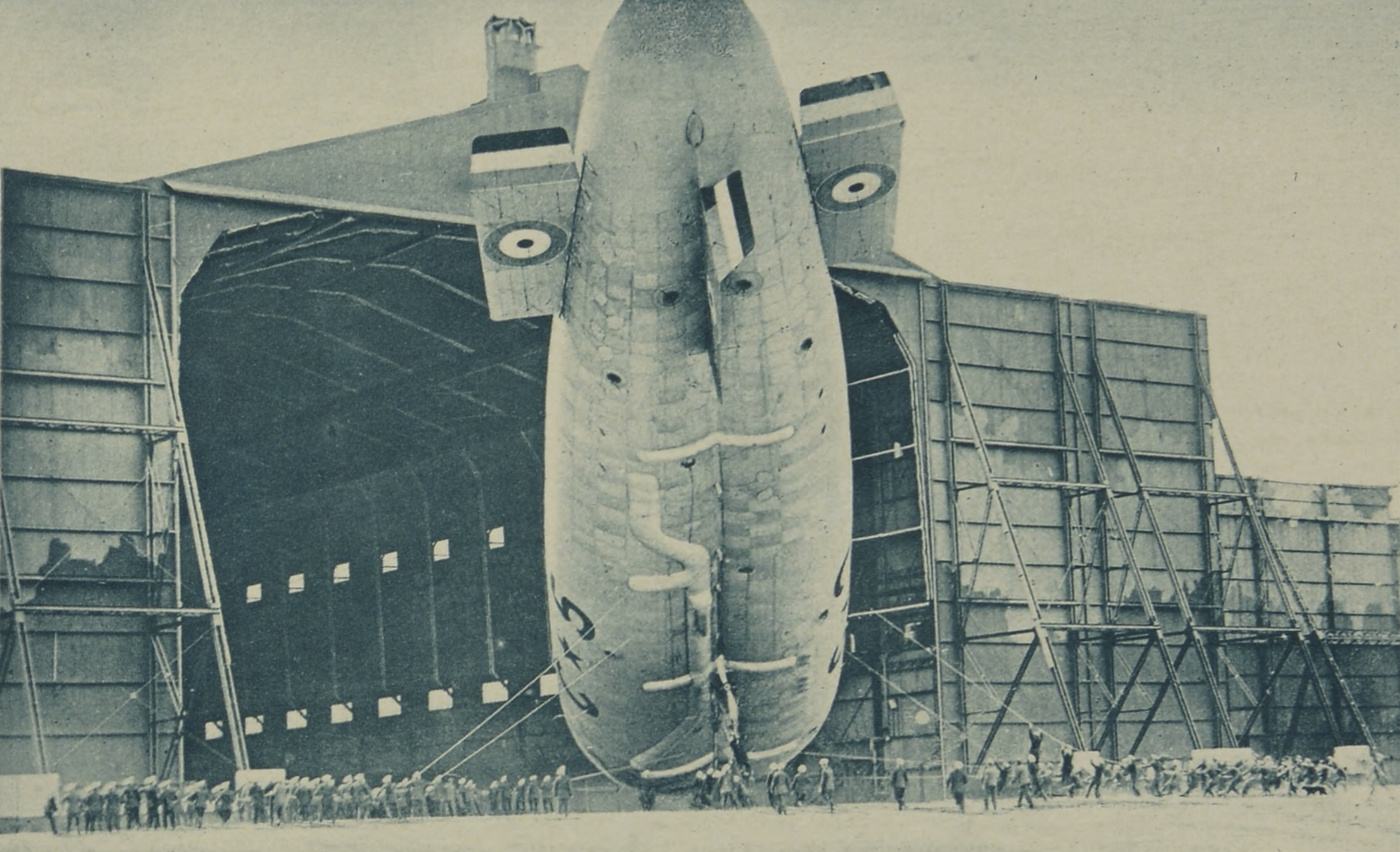
- H.M. Airship C*5 entering her hangar in a thirty-mile-an-hour wind (1918)

General information
- Type: Patrol airship
- National origin: United Kingdom
- Number built: 10

The C-Star class (sometimes written as C* class) of non-rigid airships or "blimps" were used by Britain's Royal Naval Air Service for convoy escort duties during World War I. Developed from the Coastal class (often referred to as the "C class"), the "*" in their designation indicated a modification of the original class which they slowly replaced in service.

The C-Star class were slightly larger than their predecessors. With an endurance of up to 30 hours, and more powerful (and reliable) Renault engines, the C*s had the same basic layout as the Coastal Class, with the same trilobe envelope. However, the envelope tapered towards the rear, as on the SSZ class, which greatly improved stability, as did the larger control surfaces.

== Operators ==
United Kingdom

- Royal Naval Air Service

== Specifications ==
Data from

General characteristics

- Crew: Five
- Length: 218 ft 0 in (66.46 m)
- Width: 49 ft 3 in (15.01 m)
- Height: 57 ft 3 in (17.53 m)
- Volume: 210,000 cu ft (6,000 m^{3})
- Useful lift: 4,030 lb (1,830 kg)
- Powerplant: 1 × tractor-mounted Berliet engine , 110 hp (82 kW)
- Powerplant: 1 × pusher-mounted Fiat , 260 hp (193 kW)

Performance

- Maximum speed: 58 mph (93 km/h, 50 kn)
- Endurance: at half speed 20 hours; at full speed 10 hours
- Service ceiling: 9,500 ft (2,900 m)
