= SSZ class airship =

British military blimps during WWI

SSZ class
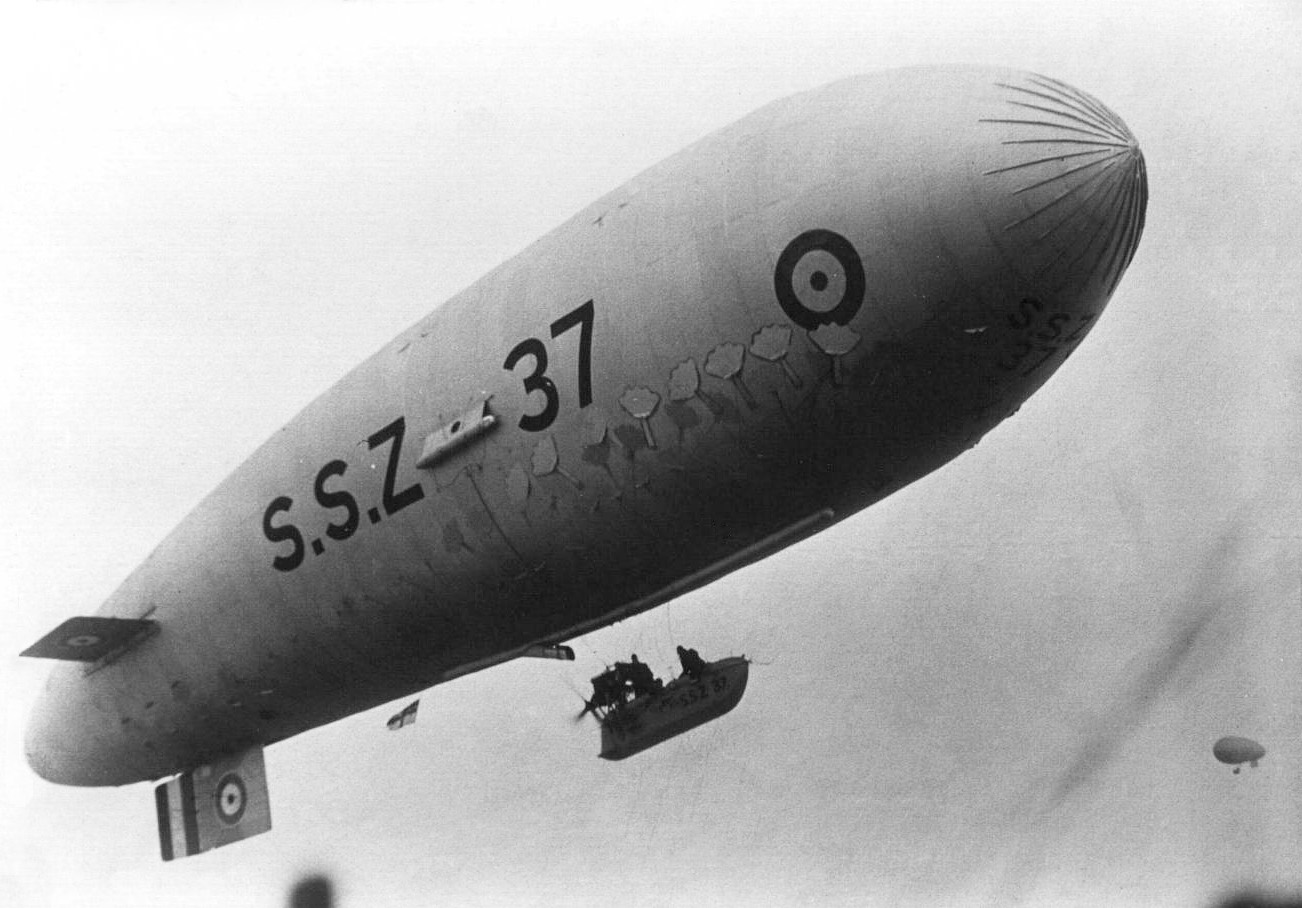

General information
- Type: Patrol airship
- National origin: United Kingdom
- Primary user: Royal Navy
- Number built: 77

History
- First flight: 1916

The SSZ (Sea Scout Zero) non-rigid airships or "blimps" were developed in United Kingdom during World War I from the earlier SS ("Sea Scout") class. The main role of these craft was to escort convoys and scout or search for German U-boats. A secondary purpose was to detect and destroy mines.

== Design and development ==
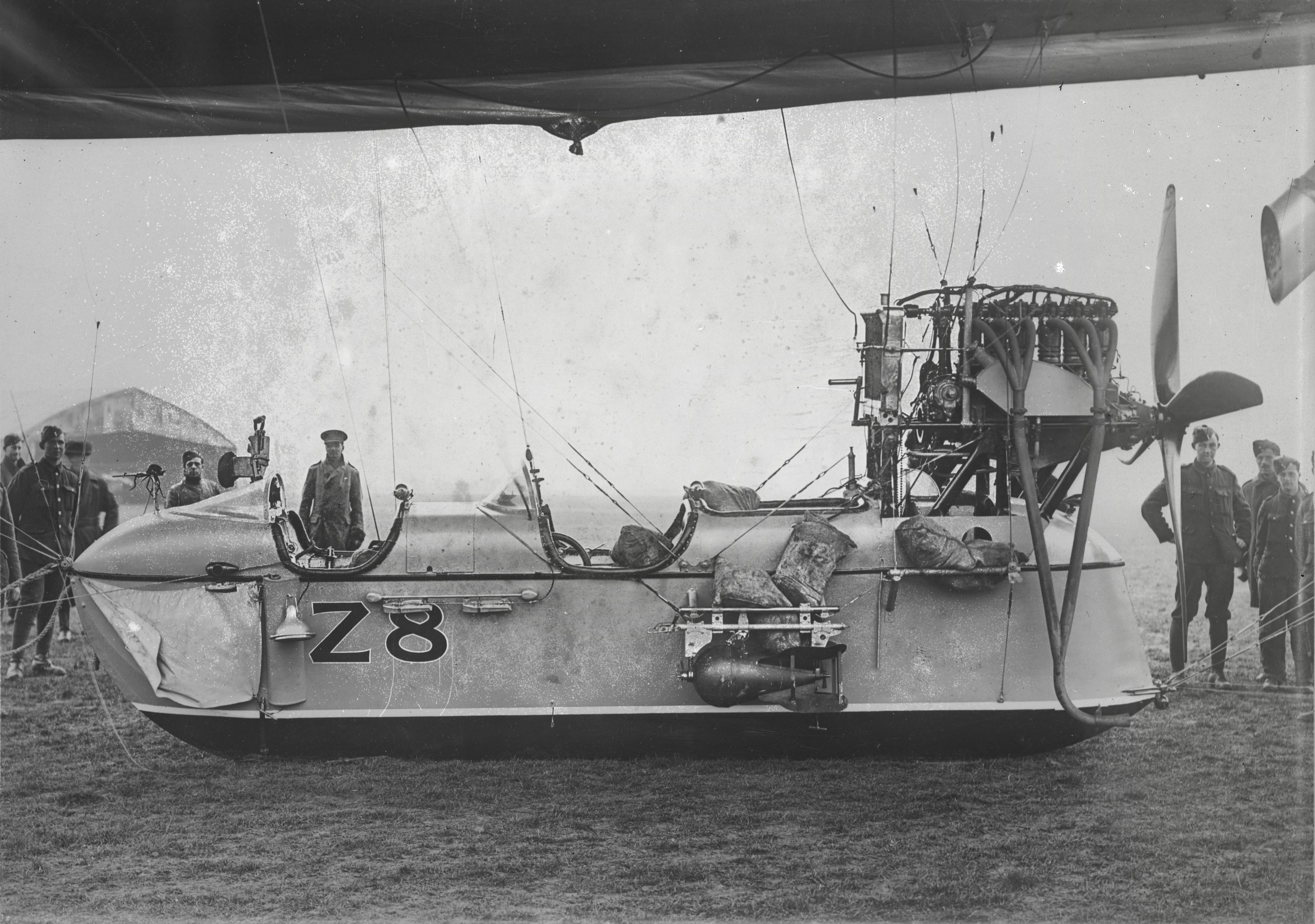
SSZ 8 airship cockpit, Alberta, Canada

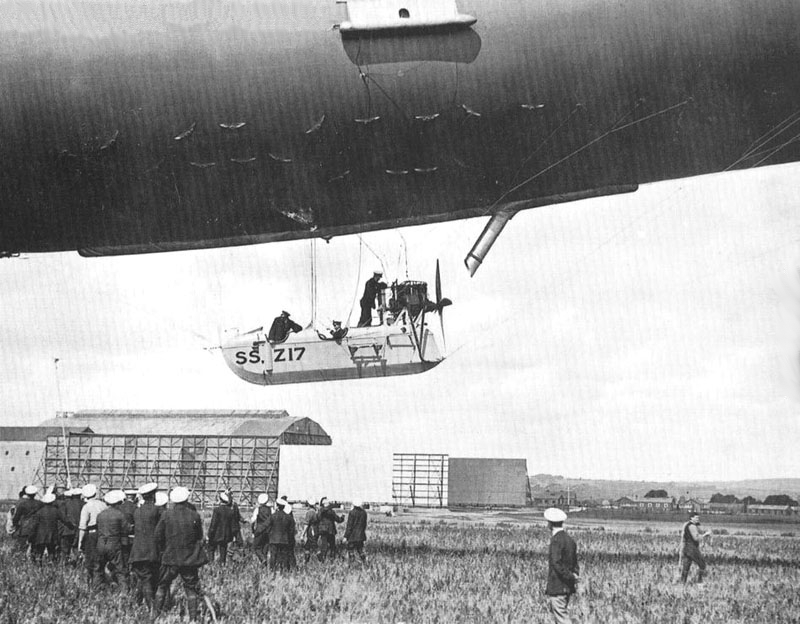
SSZ 17 landing at Pembroke, 1917. Note the boat-shaped car and scoop to supply air to the ballonets.

The SSZ was built at the Royal Naval Air Service (RNAS) airship station at Capel-le-Ferne near Folkestone to the design of three officers that were serving there as a successor to the SS class.

Similar to other SS class types, the SSZs had an envelope of 70,000 ft^{3} (2,000 m^{3}) capacity containing two ballonets of 6,375 ft^{3} (180.5 m^{3}) each; and like the SSPs, the fuel was contained in aluminium tanks slung on the axis of the envelope.

The design of the car was a departure from that of other SS types. It was streamlined, boat-shaped and watertight, was floored from end-to-end, and was enclosed with sides of fabric-covered 8-ply wood or aluminium. The car was comfortable and accommodated a 3-man crew – the forward position being occupied by the wireless operator/gunner with the pilot seated amidships, and the engineer was stationed at the rear.

A single water-cooled 75 hp (56 kW) Rolls-Royce Hawk engine was mounted on bearers above the level of the rear of the car, and drove a 9 ft (2.7 m) diameter four-bladed propeller in pusher configuration.

The SSZ design was judged superior to the SSP, which had been developed at RNAS Kingsnorth at the same time, and so the SSP was cancelled.

== Operational history ==
The SSZ's patrolled extensively from late 1917 to late 1918. The average patrol lasted eight hours, but there were instances of flights of much greater duration – three of 25–26 hours; one of 30 h 20 min; and a record of 50 h 55 min held by SSZ.39 in the summer of 1918. After the Armistice, SSZ-73 became the only airship to fly under a bridge. Major Thomas Elmhirst (CO RNAS Anglesey), piloted SSZ-73 under the Menai Suspension Bridge. The act did not harm Elmhirst's career.

On 16 August 1918, a makeshift SSZ ship was being assembled from the old SSZ-23 envelope and a spare SS Zero car at RNAS Howden airship station. Petrol fumes from a spillage in the car were ignited some time later by a spark when the radio equipment was being tested, and the ensuing fireball, fed by fuel and gas, completely enveloped and destroyed the old SSZ-23 envelope/spare car hybrid and R23X class airship R27 which were sharing a hangar. Although the hangar itself survived, one airman lost his life, and two further blimps that were moored nearby, SSZ.38 and SSZ.54, were also destroyed.

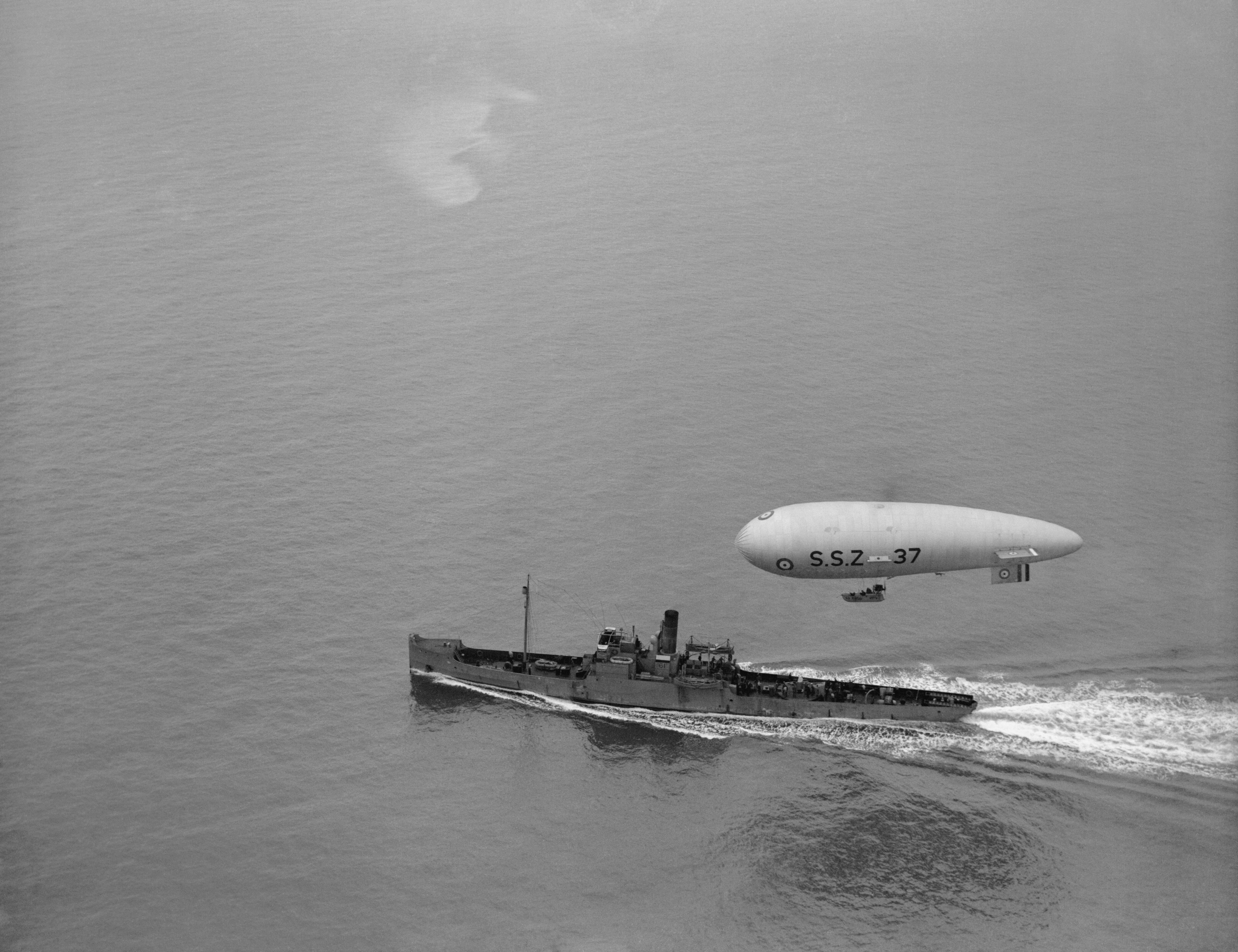
An SSZ airship escorts a Royal Navy sloop.

The SSZ's greater stability in flight and longer endurance enabled them to operate in worse weather conditions than had previously been attempted, and early in 1917 all existing SS types were superseded by the SS Zero. They were turned out as fast as they could be built, and a total of 77 SSZs were produced between 1916 and 1918, two of which were acquired by France and two by the United States. The US Navy operated two SSZ's. SSZ-23 (A-1030), and SSZ-24 (A-1029), the SSZ-23 envelope was destroyed in a hangar fire Howden in 1918, SSZ-23 the car was sent from Howden to the US on 4 August 1918. SSZ-24 apparently burned at Hampton Roads in the summer of 1918. The SSZ-23 was at Cape May, NJ, for erection on 5 February 1919. The SSZ-23 was withdrawn by mid-1920.

== Operators ==
- France
- United Kingdom
  - Royal Navy
- United States
  - United States Navy

== Specifications ==
Data from

General characteristics

- Crew: 3
- Length: 143 ft 5 in (43.70 m)
- Diameter: 30 ft 0 in (9.10 m)
- Volume: 70,000 cu ft (2,000 m^{3})
- Useful lift: 1,334 lb (605 kg)
- Powerplant: 1 × Rolls-Royce Hawk , 75 hp (56 kW)

Performance

- Maximum speed: 53 mph (85 km/h, 46 kn)
- Rate of climb: 1,200 ft/min (6.1 m/s)

Armament

- 1 x Lewis Gun
- 2 x 110 lb (50 kg) bombs or 1 x 250 lb (110 kg) bomb

== See also ==
- Comparative specifications for all SS class variants
- British blimps operated by the USN
- List of aircraft of the Royal Naval Air Service
