= Coastal class airship =

Coastal class
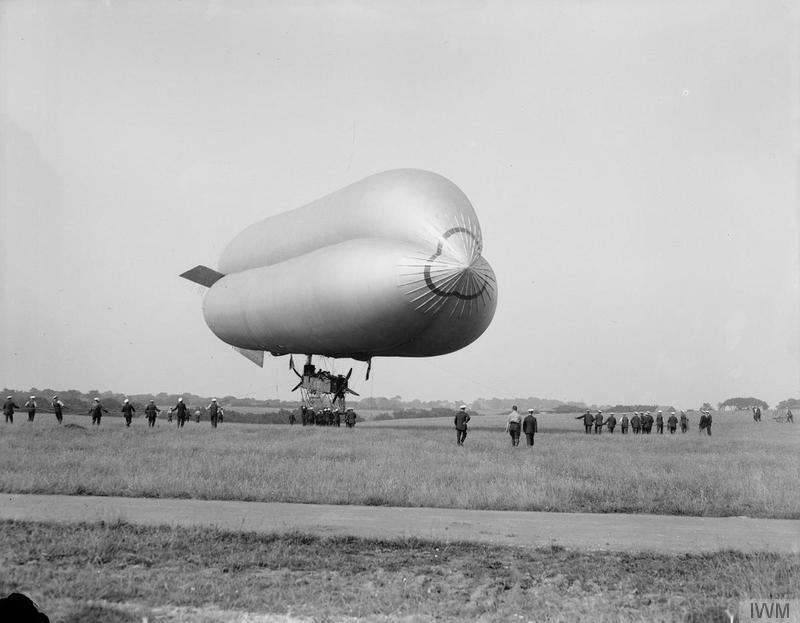
- C.23A

General information
- Type: Patrol airship (coastal patrol)
- National origin: United Kingdom
- Manufacturer: RNAS Kingsnorth
- Primary user: Royal Naval Air Service
- Number built: 35

History
- Introduction date: 1916
- First flight: 1916
- Retired: 1918
- Variant: C Star class

The Coastal Class (often known as the C-Class or simply the "Coastals") were a class of non-rigid airship or "blimp" used by the Royal Naval Air Service (RNAS) during World War I. The C-class blimp operated by the United States Navy after the war was a completely unrelated design. In total 35 Coastals were built, all at RNAS Kingsnorth, Kent. Entering service in 1916, the Coastal class remained in widespread service until 1918, with a few members of the class still in service at the signing of the Armistice, while others were replaced by the improved C-Star class as they became unfit for service. The blimps were used for long anti-submarine patrols in the Western Approaches and English Channel, protecting convoys from German U-boats. The Coastal class was one of the first aircraft types specifically designed to detect and attack submarines.

== History and design ==
The C-Class was far from a new design. The prototype was built in 1915 by using the envelope from the No. 10 Astra-Torres airship designed by Spanish engineer Leonardo Torres Quevedo, and a gondola built using the front-sections of two Avro seaplane fuselages joined together back-to-back to provide one tractor- and one pusher propeller. The envelope was composed of rubber-proofed fabric that was also doped to hold the gas and resist the effects of weather, and had a distinctive trilobe shape in which the two lower lobes were situated side-by-side, and the third was positioned centrally above them.

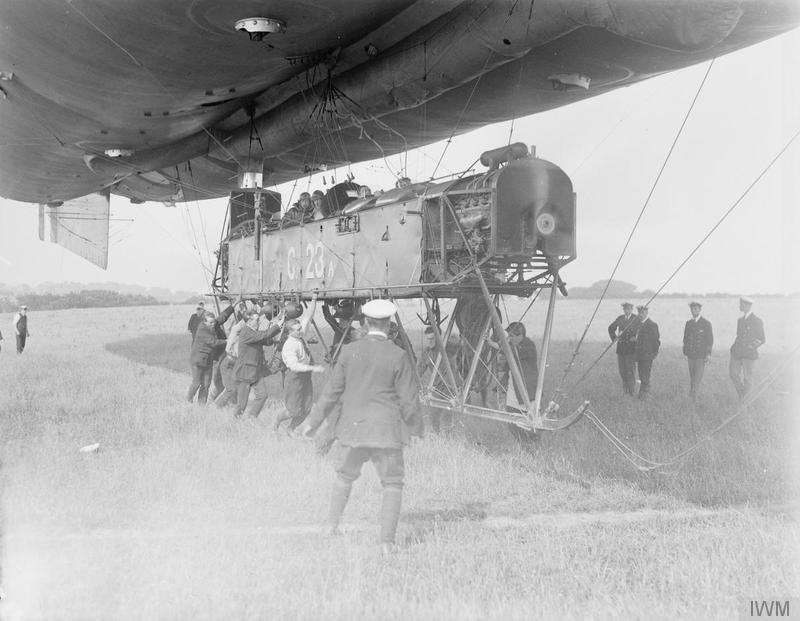
Gondola of C.23A

Sometimes referred to as the "ugliest" dirigibles ever made, production Coastals looked very similar, but used a bespoke gondola with canvas sides built over a wooden frame. The trilobe envelope allowed the gondola to be hung closer to the envelope, reducing the overall height of the aircraft and slightly reducing head resistance. Four ballonets, two in each of the two lower lobes, were used to maintain the envelope's shape and pressure. These were kept inflated by a metal air scoop mounted in the slipstream of the forward propeller on earlier examples, and at the rear propeller on later versions. The nose of the envelope was made of aluminium sheet reinforced with bamboo canes to prevent it deforming due to the airflow pressure as the airship moved. Three tailfins were used. The two upper ones were mounted in a shallow V-tail configuration and carried the elevators, while the single vertical fin below the envelope incorporated a rudder. Ten main suspensions were incorporated in the Coastal envelope, of which seven supported the weight of the gondola, and the remaining three took the guys that allowed the 196 ft (60 m)-long airships to be handled on the ground. No landing gear was fitted, apart from two wooden skids at either end of the gondola which also protected the propellers.

Various engines were used on the Coastal class. The most common configuration was two water-cooled Sunbeam engines, producing 150 hp (111 kW) each. Some replaced the aft unit with a Renault engine of 220 hp (164 kW), and various airships were deployed with a 100 hp (74 kW) Berliet engine in the front position. The former change was usually an attempt to improve the Coastals' leisurely top speed, whilst the latter was an attempt to improve reliability over the Sunbeam units, which had short lives when required to run at full speed for hours at a time in the long patrols undertaken by the airships.

A 1.5 horsepower (1.1 kW) ABC engine was mounted in the gondola. This drove a dynamo to power the radio and, if needed, an auxiliary ballonet blower.

The standard layout was to carry two 110-gallon (500 litre) fuel tanks, one per engine. These were usually mounted within the gondola, but when using the non-standard engines, the tanks would sometimes have to be relocated to outside the gondola or even hung from the rigging. Other equipment carried in the gondola included the compressed-air tanks for the engine starters, the engine oil tanks and the sandbag ballast.

There was no standard armament for the class. The most usual set-up consisted of at least two .303 Lewis guns. These could be mounted in a variety of places around the gondola. Another Lewis Gun was mounted on a Scarff ring on the top of the envelope to provide a token defence from attacking aircraft. This position was accessed by climbing up a light wooden- or rope ladder inside a tube running up inside the envelope. Some C-Class commanders fitted additional Lewis guns to the bottom of the gondola to provide added firepower against submarines. Firing these required the crew to lean out of their cockpits or even stand on the landing skid to operate the weapon.

The main anti-submarine armament was bombs. Most patrols carried four 100 or 112-lb (45 or 50 kg) bombs, but these could be replaced with a pair of 230-lb (104 kg) bombs or depth charges. The standard British Lee–Enfield rifle was often carried by one of the crew to destroy any mines found. A plate camera could be carried, usually used for surveys to prepare nautical charts.

The standard crew was five: a pilot, a coxswain, an observer, a radio operator and a mechanic.

== Performance ==
The design of the C-Class was unsophisticated. The type was unstable, with poor control authority. The responsiveness in the controls was sluggish and often caused the crew to be airsick. However one of the main advances in airship technology was the very high rate of climb which the coastals managed to provide. It had a top speed of around 40 knots (75 km/h), making it vulnerable to enemy aircraft and even surface ships. Even at these modest speeds, and despite its strengthening ribs, the nose of the airship was prone to denting, further compromising handling.

The engines were prone to failure, regardless of the type used. This was mainly due to the extended duration of the patrols, which could reach 20 hours in length. The engines were run at virtually full speed all this time, leading to many units simply wearing out, and RNAS station maintenance crews became skilled at rapidly overhauling the engines. Other problems stemmed from the engine's magnetos. Before the war, the majority of magnetos used worldwide had been made in Germany, usually by Bosch and AEG; but the British-made Lucas replacements were of poorer quality and it was common for crews to carry several spares on patrol and many became adept at changing them in mid-flight.

The open, unheated cockpits of the Coastals were uncomfortable; some crew members resorted to walking around the outside of the gondola on the grab-handles to stretch their legs. In winter crews were at risk from frostbite and hypothermia. Often ground staff had to lift crewmen from their cockpit, they being unable to help themselves.

Shortly after entering service, the ballonet air-scoop was relocated from behind the front propeller to behind the rear propeller. This not only improved the efficiency of the system, but greatly improved the visibility from the front cockpits, making the difficult task of landing the airships slightly easier.

Despite these flaws, the C-Class was the only aircraft available that could mount the long patrols needed to keep the Western Approaches and carry a useful bomb load in the hope of destroying a U-boat.

== Operations ==
To maximise the amount of daylight for patrols, takeoffs would be made before dawn and landings would take place in darkness at night. RNAS stations were not equipped with floodlights or marker lights, and most landings were made in near-total darkness, with only hurricane lanterns held by the ground crew providing basic illumination. Later C-Class airships had a hatch in the floor of the gondola to allow a flare to be fired downwards to light up the landing ground.

The RNAS provided a standard ration pack for each crew member for the flight. This was usually little more than some salted bacon or a sandwich, some Cadbury's chocolate and a flask of tea.

The airships carried no mechanical method of detecting submarines. On war patrols, crews had to rely on their own eyesight to find a U-boat, but in 1918 experiments were carried out to develop a buoy carrying a basic ASDIC set that would be trailed below the craft; however, the war ended before this project was completed.

If the sea was calm, it was sometimes possible to make out the wake of a submerged submarine's periscope poking above the surface, or even the faint outline of the submarine itself if it was running just below the surface. The more reliable method was to search for a light oil slick on the surface coming from the various external bearings on the submarine. The airship crew would follow this trail until they reached the end of the slick, where it could be assumed the U-boat was.

Most encounters started with the submarine on the surface. Even if the airship crew sighted the submarine, the enemy crew were just as likely to sight the slowly approaching airship, dive and so have a good chance of escape.

When airships escorted convoys, it was more effective to shadow the convoy and wait for the submarine to attack. The release of air when a torpedo was fired and the weapon's wake would betray the submarine's position.

The overall offensive capabilities of the C-Class was weak – in total, only six U-boats were confirmed sunk by the 35-strong class during World War I. However, they had a great deterrent value. The type allowed the RNAS to operate a continuous air presence in the Western Approaches and English Channel. U-boat commanders were wary of the British airships and many chose to operate only outside the main shipping lanes, which greatly decreased the risk to convoys. Throughout 1918 not a single convoy ship was lost to U-boat action whilst the convoy was being protected by an RNAS airship. The C-Class, and other RNAS airship classes, also contributed to the sinking of several U-boats by surface ships, being able to track a submarine's course and guide a destroyer or armed trawler to its position. Even if the airships attacked a target but failed to damage it, the submarine would often abort an attack once the commander knew an airship was on hand. Similarly, airship crews soon realised that after an attack a submarine commander would often surface to confirm his "kill", and to allow his boat to exit the area at maximum speed. Airships simply had to hover over the site of the attack and wait for the U-boat to come to the surface.

The sluggish performance of the Coastal class made them vulnerable to enemy aircraft. The RNAS was careful to keep its airships away from the central and eastern parts of the English Channel, which were in range of German bombers and some fighters. On the rare aerial encounters that occurred, the airship crew's tactic was to run for the nearest coast, where anti-aircraft guns could drive away the attackers. It was difficult to physically destroy the blimps – bullets could knock out the engines, which would simply cause the airship to drift; or puncture the envelope, which would cause the craft to slowly settle to the ground. German fighter aircraft posed the greatest threat as their tracer ammunition could ignite the hydrogen in the envelope. The gunner manning the gun position at the top of the envelope was especially vulnerable, being directly in an attacker's line of fire and sitting atop a large, slow-moving bag of hydrogen. Many airship crews decided that the upper gun was ineffective, and moved it down onto the gondola to provide further offensive power.

Towards the end of 1917, many of these ships were in need of a complete refit having been in commission for over two years. Initially several were put in order, but it was later decided instead to replace each ship as it became no longer fit to fly by the more modern Coastal type known as the C-Star (C*) -class. These had a larger envelope with a capacity of 210,000 cu ft (5,900 m^{3}) containing six ballonets of 68,860 cu ft (1,950 m^{3}) in total for an increased useful lift of 4,030 lb (1,830 kg); had a greater fuel capacity, a top speed of 57 mph (92 km/h), and had a service ceiling of 9,500 ft (2,900 m).

The most successful Coastal airship (often described as "the darling of the airship service" during the War) was C-9, operating out of RNAS Mullion in Cornwall. C-9 had one confirmed and three probable "kills" during her long career. She entered service in June 1916 and was struck off on 14 September 1918, after completing 3,720 hours of flying, covering 68,200 miles (109,800 km). It was claimed that in her 805 days of service she never missed an assigned patrol.

In July 1917 C-24 set a new world record for airborne endurance when she mounted a patrol that lasted for 24 hours, 15 minutes.

A total of 45 standard Coastals and C-Stars were built. Twelve were totally destroyed in one way or another, but only two were lost to enemy action in the entire war, and just four survived to the Armistice.

== Operators ==
United Kingdom

- Royal Naval Air Service

== Specifications (typical) ==
Data from

General characteristics

- Crew: Five
- Length: 218 ft 0 in (59.76 m)
- Width: 39 ft 6 in (12.04 m)
- Height: 52 ft 0 in (15.85 m)
- Volume: 170,000 cu ft (4,800 m^{3})
- Useful lift: 3,580 lb (1,630 kg)
- Powerplant: 2 × Sunbeam engines , 150 hp (112 kW) each

Performance

- Maximum speed: 52 mph (84 km/h, 45 kn)
- Endurance: at full speed 11 hours, at half speed 22 hours
- Service ceiling: 8,000 ft (2,400 m)
- Rate of climb: 1,000 ft/min (5.1 m/s)

Armament

- 2–6 × .303 in (7.7 mm) Lewis machine guns
- 4 × 112 lb (50 kg) bombs or 2 × 230 lb (104 kg) bombs or depth charges

== Sources ==
- London, P. (1999). U-boat Hunters: Cornwall's Air War 1916–19. Truro: Dyllansow Truran. ISBN 1-85022-135-9.
- Turpin, Brian J. (2023). "The Pulham Coastals: Royal Naval Air Service Airship Operations in Norfolk, 1916–17". The Aviation Historian (44): 92–100. ISSN 2051-1930.
- Jane's All the World's Aircraft 1919. London: Sampson Low Marston.
