= Rolls-Royce Hawk =

Hawk
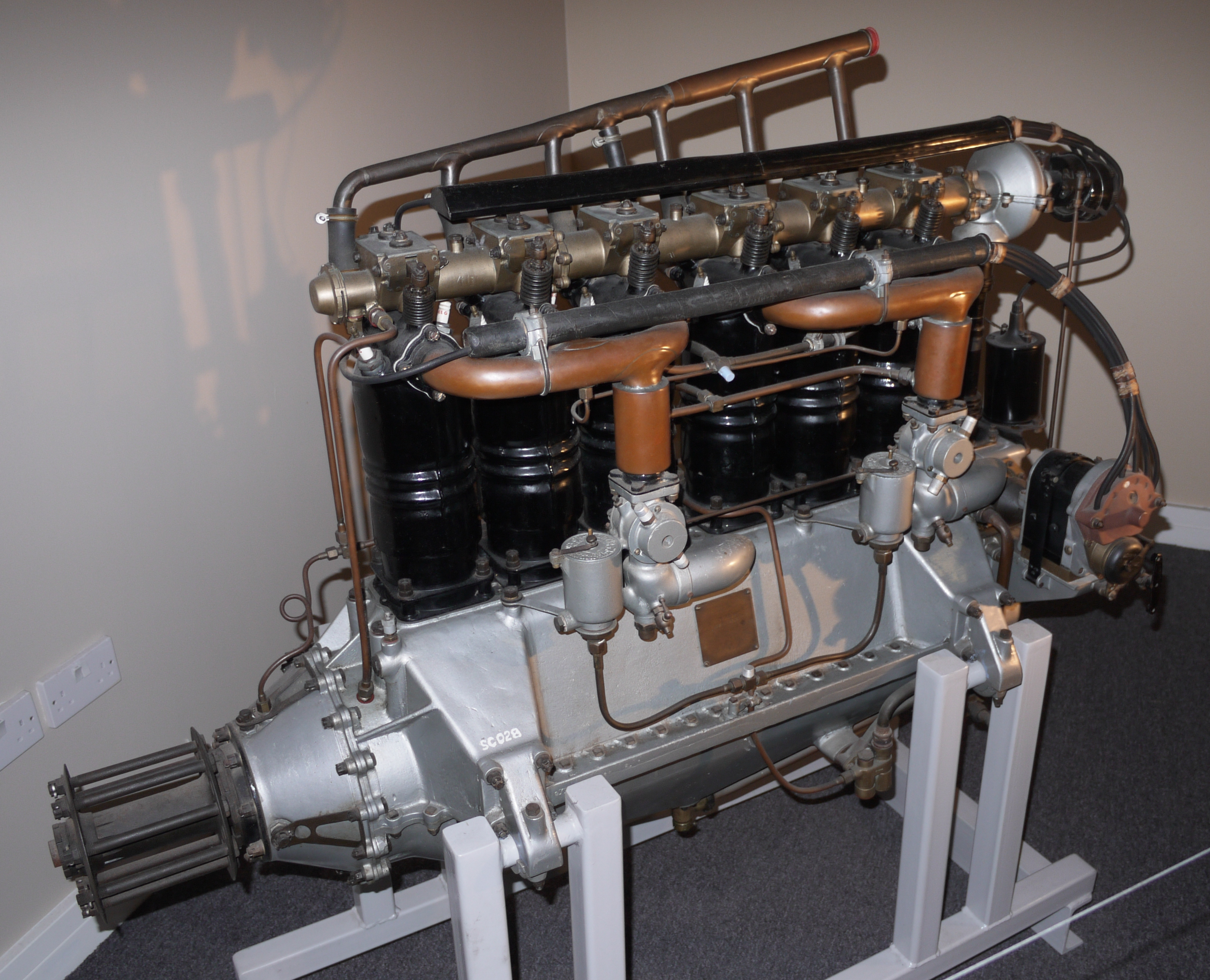
- Preserved Rolls-Royce Hawk
- Type: Liquid-cooled six-cylinder inline piston engine
- Manufacturer: Rolls-Royce Limited
- First run: 1914
- Major applications: SSZ class blimp
- Number built: 205

The Rolls-Royce Hawk was a British aero engine designed by Rolls-Royce in 1915. Derived from one bank of six cylinders of the Rolls-Royce Eagle, it produced 75 horsepower at 1,370 rpm. Power was progressively increased to 91 hp by February 1916, and 105 hp by October 1918.

After Rolls-Royce made the prototypes, the Hawk was manufactured under licence by Brazil Straker in Bristol between 1915 and 1918. During this period 204 engines were built, and the Hawk earned a reputation for high reliability.

Many engines of this type were used to power the SSZ class coastal patrol airships of which 76 were built.

== Applications ==
- Avro 504F
- Farman MF.7
- Royal Aircraft Factory B.E.2
- Sage Type 3
- SS class blimp (1 example)
- SSP class blimp
- SSZ class blimp
- SST class blimp

Post war one engine (serial number 332) was fitted into a specially built hull and launched on Windermere in 1922 with the name Canfly. With a flywheel added it was directly connected to the boat's propeller without a gearbox. Capable of reaching speeds of 26 knots (30 mph; 48 km/h) Canfly was used as the official's boat at several world speed record attempts during the 1920s and 1930s. The boat and engine are now displayed in a working but non-operational state at the Windermere Jetty museum.

== Specifications (Hawk I) ==
Data from Lumsden

=== General characteristics ===
- Type: 6-cylinder liquid-cooled inline aircraft piston engine
- Bore: 4 in (101.6 mm)
- Stroke: 6 in (152.4 mm)
- Displacement: 452.3 in^{3} (7.41 L)
- Length: 46.85 in (1190 mm)
- Width: 23.5 in (597 mm)
- Height: 35.5 in (902 mm)
- Dry weight: 387 lb (175.5 kg)

=== Components ===
- Valvetrain: OHC – Overhead camshaft
- Fuel system: Twin Claudel-Hobson FZR carburettors
- Fuel type: Petrol
- Cooling system: Liquid-cooled

=== Performance ===
- Power output: 75 hp (56 kW) at 1,350 rpm
- Compression ratio: 5.1:1
- Power-to-weight ratio: 0.2 hp/lb (0.3 kW/kg)

== See also ==
- Rolls-Royce aircraft piston engines

Comparable engines

- Mercedes D.II

Related lists

- List of aircraft engines
