= Akron-class airship =

Early 1930s US Navy rigid airships

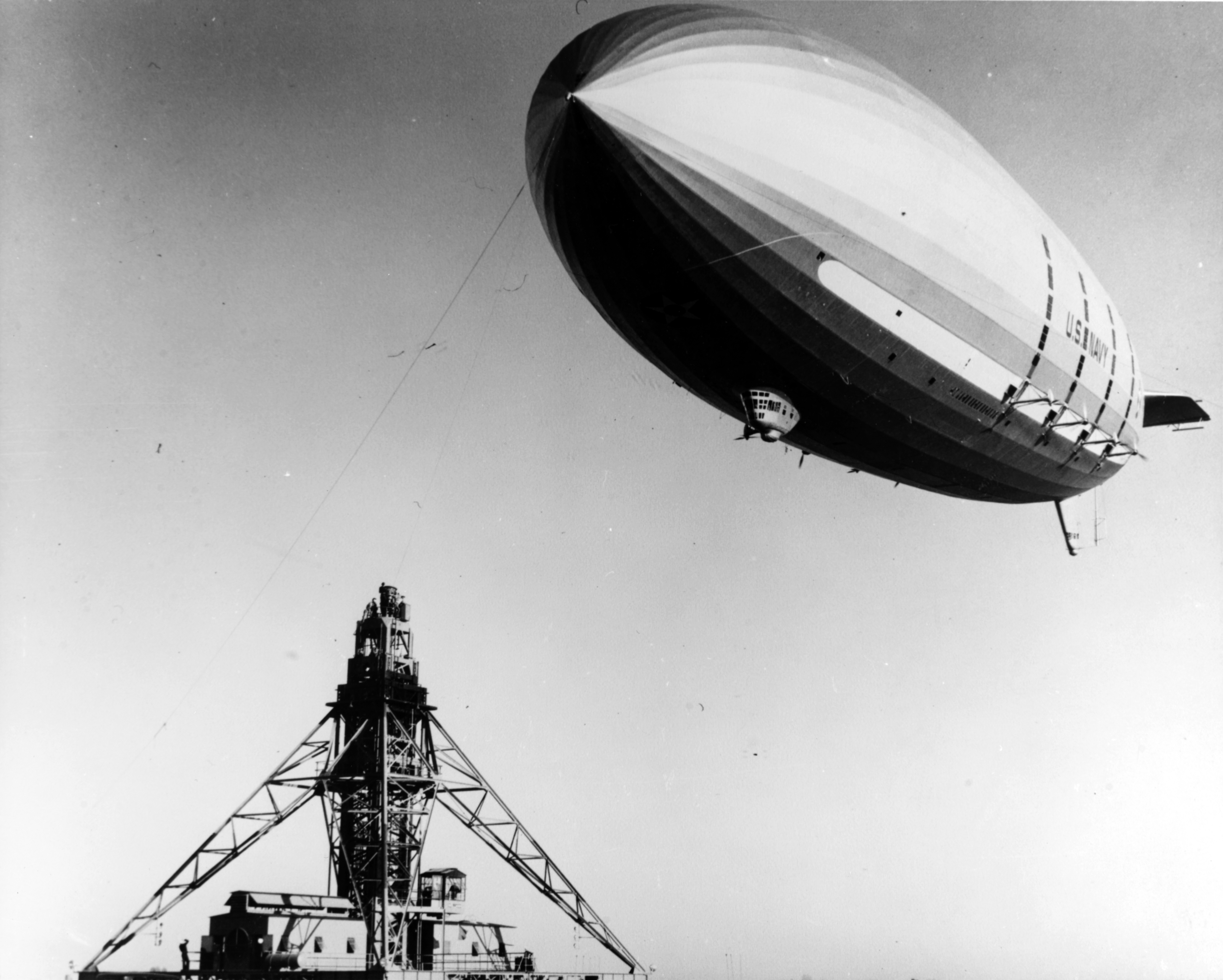
- USS Macon preparing to tie up to the mooring mast at NAS Moffett Field in October 1933

General information
- Type: Patrol and reconnaissance airship
- Manufacturer: Goodyear-Zeppelin Corporation, Springfield Township, Ohio
- Primary user: United States Navy
- Number built: 2

The Akron-class airships were a class of two rigid airships constructed for the US Navy in the early 1930s. Designed as scouting and reconnaissance platforms, they were intended to act as "eyes for the fleet", extending the range at which the US Navy's Scouting Force could operate to beyond the horizon. This capability was extended further through the use of the airships as airborne aircraft carriers, with each capable of carrying a small squadron of airplanes that could be used both to increase the airship's scouting range, and to provide self-defense for the airship against other airborne threats.

The two ships were built as a continuation of the US Navy's rigid airship program that had started just after World War I, and were used to further refine the tactics of the use of such machines in the fleet, predominantly over whether it was the airship that was the scout, with its air group only there for self-defense, or whether the airship was merely the mother ship and the airplanes were responsible for carrying out the long-range scouting mission.

Both ships had short careers in the US Navy, as each one crashed into the sea during routine flights less than two years after it was commissioned.

== Background ==
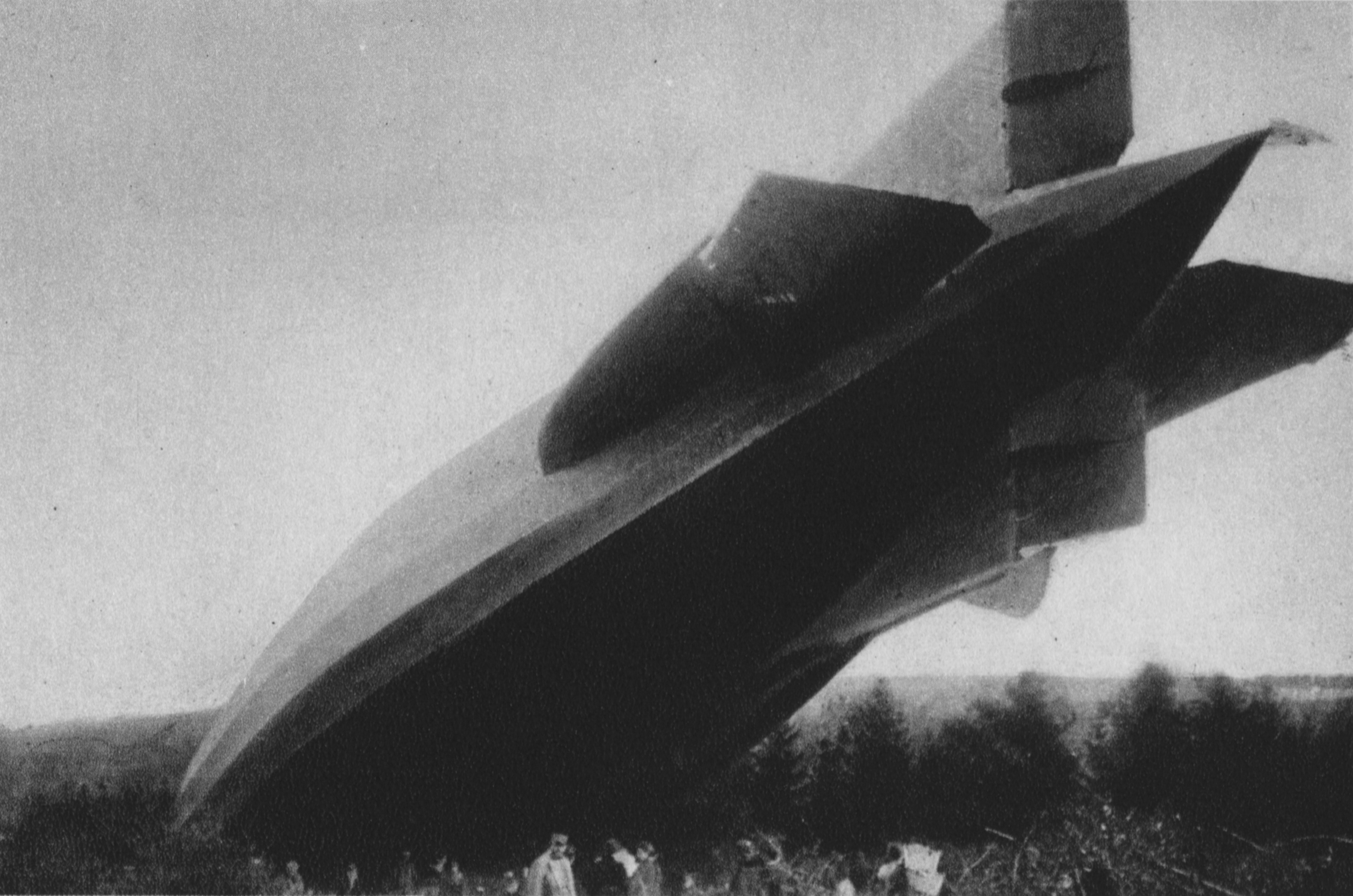
The German zeppelin L 49; the study of this captured zeppelin influenced the design of the first US Navy rigid airship, USS Shenandoah

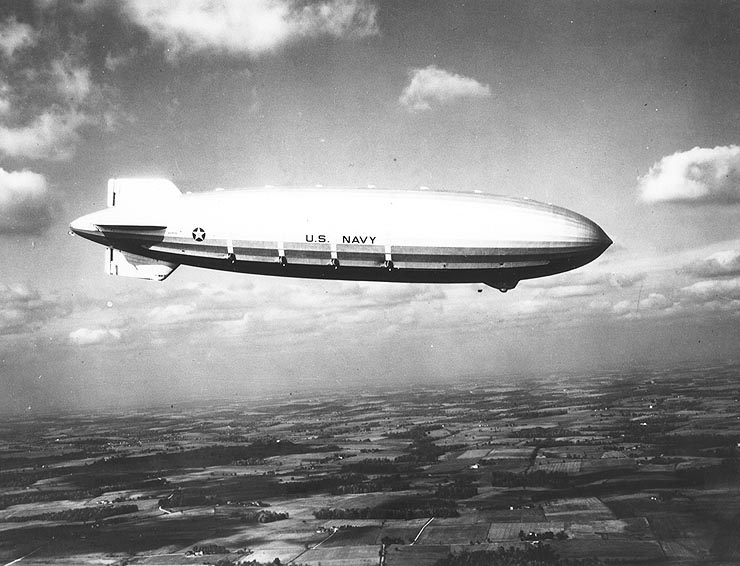
USS Akron on its first flight after commissioning into the US Navy

The US Navy had been experimenting with rigid airships since shortly after the end of the First World War. In 1917, a German zeppelin, L 49, was forced down in France following a bombing raid over England, and was captured virtually undamaged. This led to the idea of the United States obtaining a pair of German airships as part of the reparations plan, but they were destroyed by their crews in 1919. As a substitute plan, it was agreed that Germany would build and pay for an airship to be turned over to the Americans, while the US would build one of its own. In July 1919, the US Navy placed an order with the Naval Aircraft Factory in Philadelphia for the components to build a new rigid airship, which would be assembled at Naval Air Station Lakehurst in New Jersey; initially designated as FA-1 (Fleet Airship Number 1), the ship was redesignated as ZR-1. The plan for the Germans to construct an airship was modified when the Royal Navy cancelled its order for four rigid airships. The first ship of the class, R38, was already under construction, and so an agreement was reached in October 1919 to sell the incomplete airship to the United States, which gave it the designation ZR-2.

In 1921, ZR-2 was completed and undertook test flights from its construction site at Cardington, before travelling for further testing over the North Sea, being based at Howden. During a test flight in August, ZR-2 experienced a catastrophic structural failure and crashed into the Humber Estuary, killing all but five aboard. Despite this setback, the US Navy continued with its rigid airship program, starting construction of ZR-1 in June 1922. As a safety measure, it was decided that rather than using hydrogen as the lifting gas, which had been used on ZR-2, and which caused the fires following its crash, ZR-1 would be filled with helium. The scarcity of helium, and the expense of extracting it, meant that the airship used most of the world's reserve of the gas. ZR-1 was commissioned into the US Navy as USS Shenandoah in October 1923. At this time, another new rigid airship was under construction at the Luftschiffbau Zeppelin works in Germany - intended to replace the ships intended for reparations after the war, the ship was also used as a means of keeping zeppelin construction alive in Germany. Known initially by its construction number as LZ 126, it was appropriated by the US Navy as ZR-3 and commissioned as USS Los Angeles in November 1924. Owing to the scarcity of helium, upon its commissioning, Los Angeles used gas obtained from Shenandoah; the intention was to alternate use of the two airships until more of the gas could be obtained.

The use of Shenandoah and Los Angeles as platforms to evolve the tactics of airship use with the fleet led to the US Navy instituting a plan to procure a pair of new, purpose-built airships, which originated in a set of design studies undertaken by the Bureau of Aeronautics in 1924 as BuAer Design No. 60, intended as an improvement over the Shenandoah design. The loss of Shenandoah in a crash in Ohio in September 1925 did not interrupt this; indeed, the incident left the US Navy with only one rigid airship that, under the terms of her construction, was not permitted to take part in military operations. As a consequence, a pair of new airships was authorized in June 1926, with the Goodyear-Zeppelin Corporation winning the contract to build them in October 1928. To facilitate construction, the company built a brand-new construction and storage hangar, which came to be known as the Goodyear Airdock, in 1929. Upon completion of the building, work began on building the first of the new airships, which received the designations ZRS-4 and ZRS-5.

== Design ==
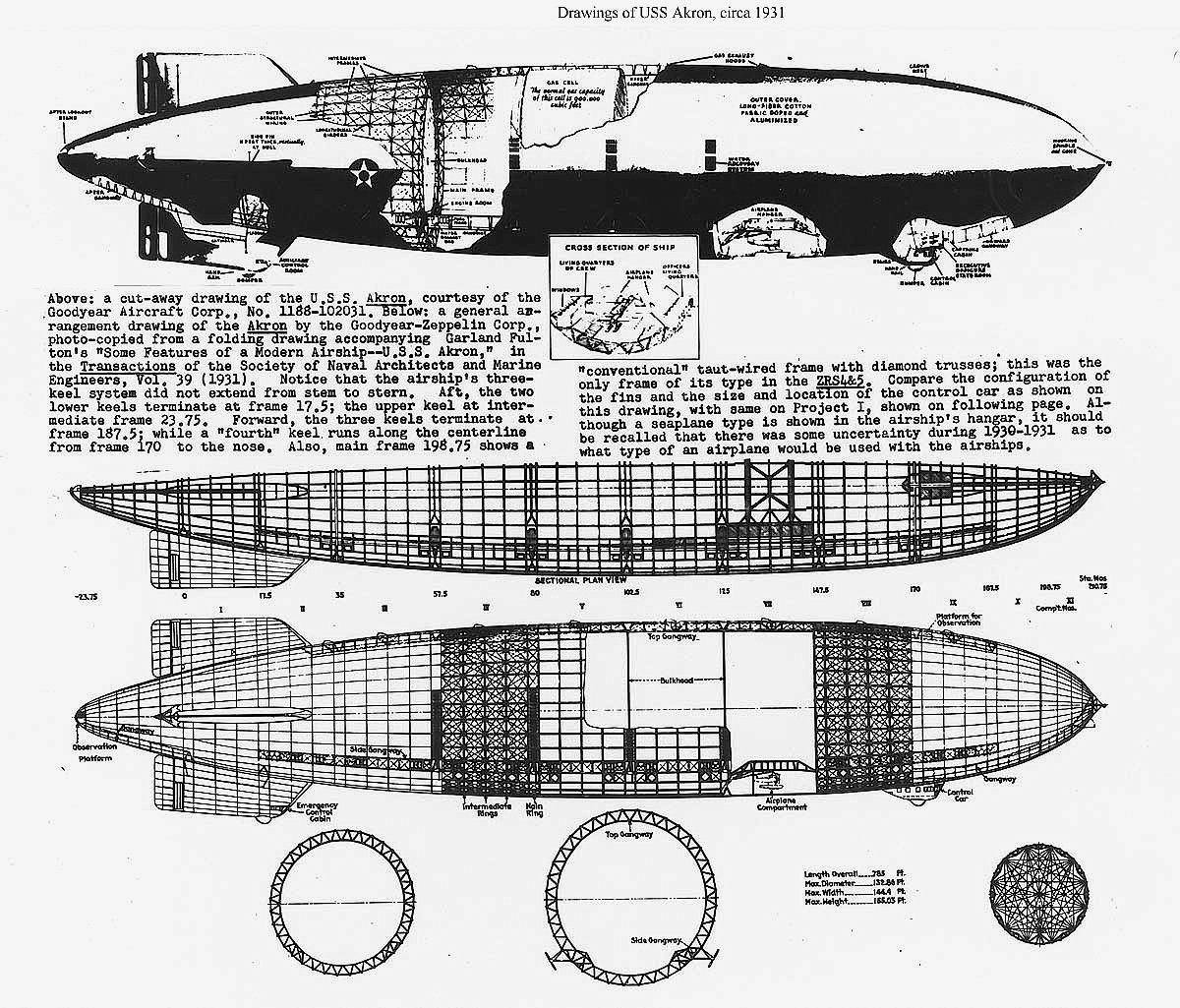
Design drawings of the Akron class

The two ships that became the Akron class were the first large rigid airships to be both designed and built in the US. Goodyear-Zeppelin was a joint venture between Goodyear and Luftschiffbau Zeppelin, with the sharing of German experts and ideas to train the employees of Goodyear in airship construction. As part of this collaboration, Luftschiffbau Zeppelin's Chief Stress Engineer, Karl Arnstein, went to the United States to work with Goodyear on new designs and techniques. This allowed Arnstein to develop ideas of airship design away from the more conservative methods employed by the German company's chief designer, Ludwig Dürr.

=== "Deep Rings" and triple keel ===
Most traditional zeppelin designs were composed of a series of main rings, made from a single reinforced girder, with unreinforced rings, which provided shape but not structural strength, in the spaces in between. Arnstein's proposal for the two new ships was to have the main rings composed of a pair of rings, connected by supports that formed triangles all around the circumference of the ring. These "deep rings", made of duraluminum, were spaced further apart than the single rings used in zeppelins, and were believed to offer greater strength, for which the US Navy was prepared to accept that the framework was heavier than in similar German-produced airships. Similarly, rather than using a single structural keel along the underside of the hull, Arnstein's design had three, triangular shaped keels - one along the top of the airship, which was used to provide access to the valves of the ship's gas cells, and two more placed at 45 degree angles on each side of the bottom of the hull, which supported the engine compartments and crew spaces.

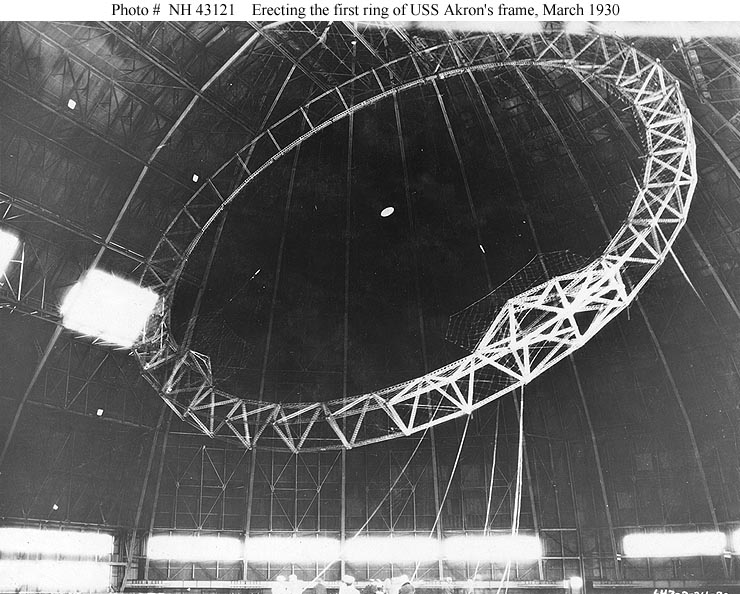
One of Akron's main rings during construction, showing the "deep ring" design with triangular supports

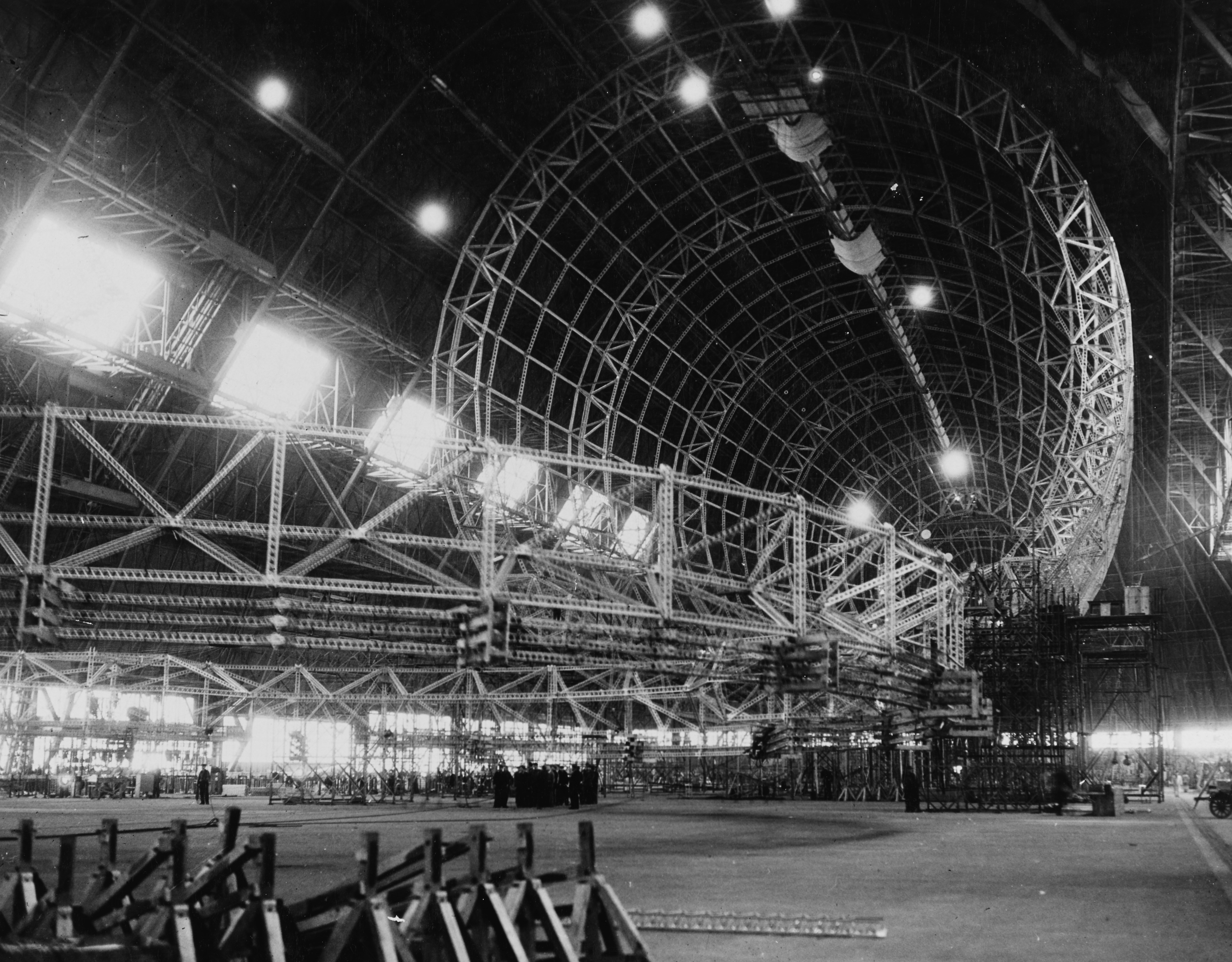
Macon under construction; the design of the main ring can be clearly seen

=== Engines and gas cells ===
Unlike in previous airship designs, the new US ships, with their triple keels and using helium rather than hydrogen, were designed to have their engine compartments installed within the hull, rather than having external power cars, which had the benefits of easier access to the engines and reduced drag in flight. Each of the eight Maybach VL-2 12-cylinder gasoline-powered engines was capable of 560 hp (418 kW), with the propeller shafts attached being rotatable, allowing forward and reverse thrust, and downward thrust to assist in landing. The ships had installed a total of twelve gas cells made of gelatin-latex fabric, each containing 541,660 ft^{3} (15,338 m^{3}) of helium.

One compromise that had to be reached over the placement of the engines was that they were mounted in a straight line. Most airships of the period had their engines mounted at different heights along the length of the hull, which allowed each propeller to operate in relatively "clean" air that had not been displaced by the propeller in front. However, attempting to re-engineer the structure of the hull to try and stagger the placement of the engines was seen as both adding too much weight and being too complex.

Akron, as originally built, was fitted with 18 ft (5.5 m) two-bladed, fixed-pitch wooden propellers to each of her engines but, in June 1932, was modified to be fitted with new, three-bladed, variable pitch metal propellers. These new propellers were fitted to Macon as standard while it was under construction, increasing the ship's fuel efficiency. This, combined with design improvements that removed some hull protrusions (improving the aerodynamics) and a reduction of her overall dead weight by as much as 4 short tons (3,600 kg), led to it achieving a speed of 75.6 knots (140.0 km/h; 87.0 mph) during speed trials in August 1933, more than 3 knots faster than the maximum speed requirement specified by the Navy, and 6 knots faster than Akron's best recorded speed of 69 knots (79 mph; 128 km/h).

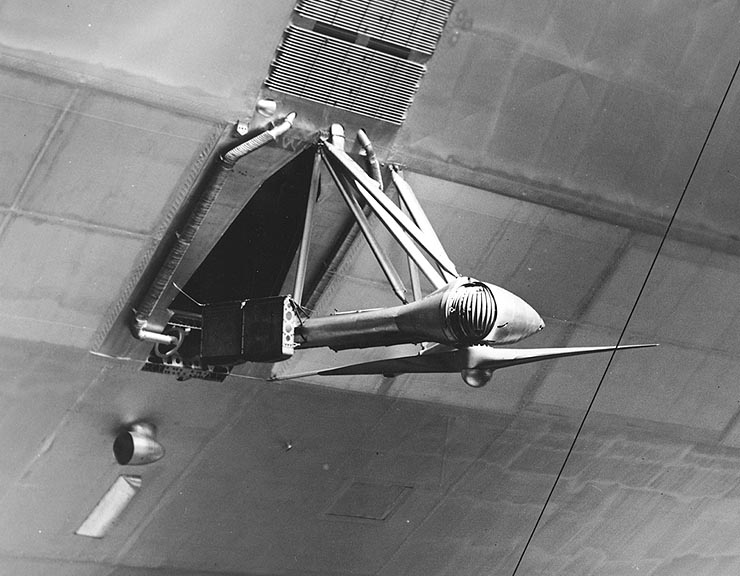
One of Akron's propellers emerging from the ship's hull

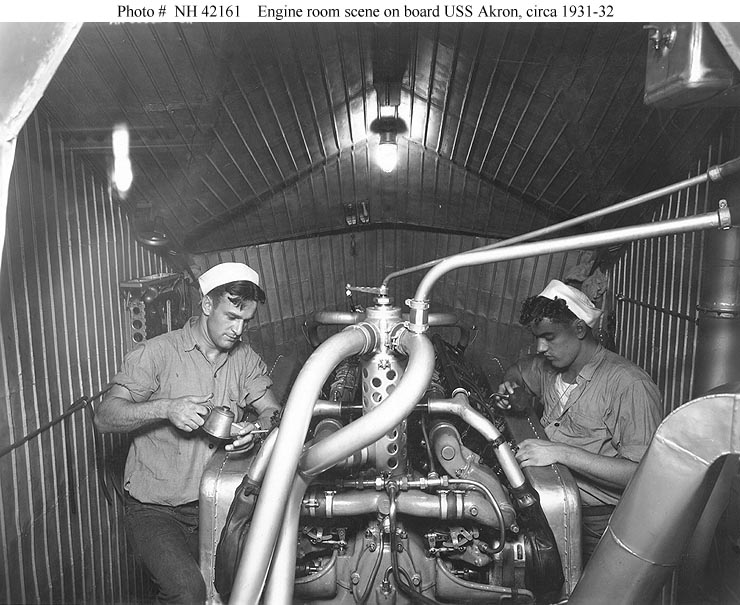
Two engineers in one of Akron's engine rooms

=== Tail and stabilizers ===
The design of the Akron class did away with the traditional cruciform tail and altered the shape and position of the stabilizers. The ship's stabilizers were originally designed to be secured on the hull at three main ring points, but this was changed by shortening them to have them secured at only two points, with the leading edge only attached to the intermediate frame rather than the load-bearing structure. This design change came about following an incident involving the German passenger airship Graf Zeppelin, which, when taking off in 1929, had almost struck a set of power lines with its lower fin, which could not be seen from the ship's control gondola. In order to make the lower fin visible, the design was changed to shorten the fin. This proved to be a design flaw that was a major contributory factor to the loss of Macon in 1935.

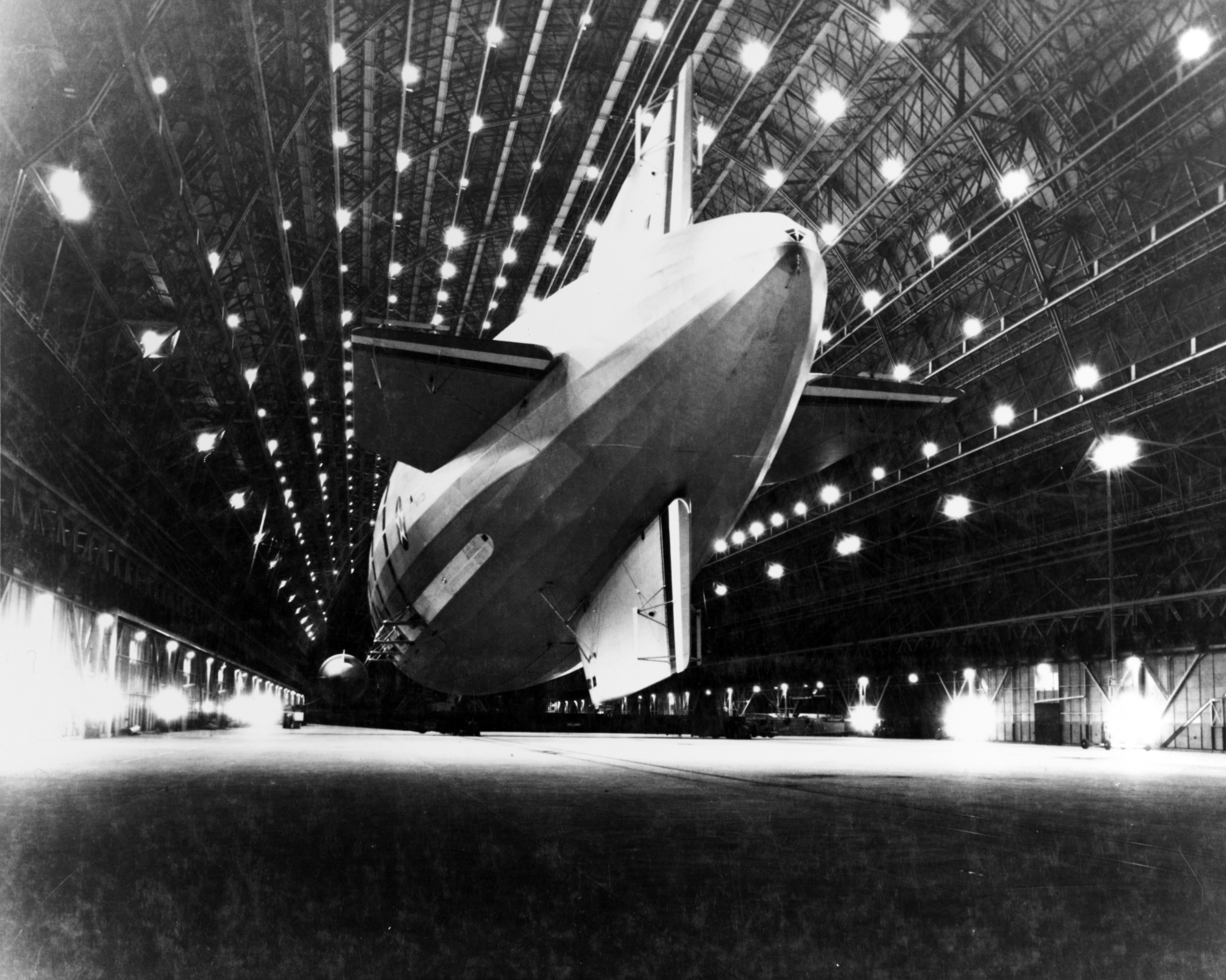
Macon showing its tail; unlike traditional rigid airship designs, the tail was not cruciform, with the stabilizers instead mounted onto the hull rings at the rear of the ship.

=== Water recovery ===
When the decision was taken to use helium instead of hydrogen in 1922, Shenandoah was fitted with a set of condensers to allow the collection of water vapor from the engine exhausts to create ballast and manage the ship's buoyancy. In most airship designs this would have been accomplished by venting gas as fuel was burned, but because helium was so expensive to produce (approximately $55 per 1000 ft^{3} in 1923), and Shenandoah had required approximately 2.1 million cubic feet (59,000 m^{3}) to fill its gas cells, the decision was taken to not routinely vent the valuable gas, and instead collect water vapor. The Akron class required three times more gas to fill the cells, which made the collection of water more important, in spite of the increased availability of helium through improvements in production, transport and storage. The condensers appeared as black strips on the ship's envelope directly above each propeller.

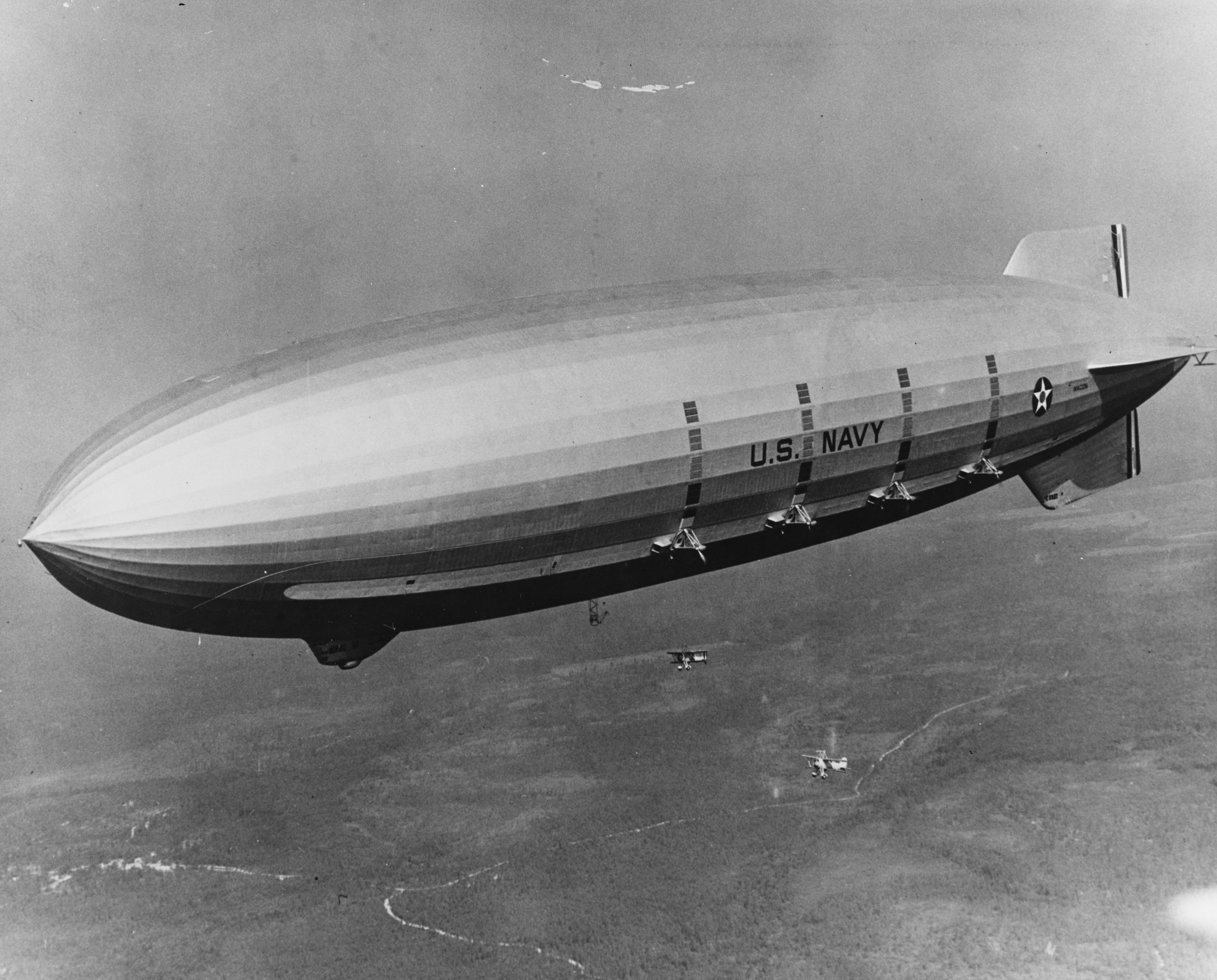
The dark strips above each propeller led to the water condensers

=== Aircraft hangar ===
One significant innovation of the Akron class airships was the inclusion in the hull of a 75-by-60-by-16-foot (22.9 m × 18.3 m × 4.9 m) hangar capable of accommodating up to five small airplanes for use as scouts and fighters. A trapeze-and-hoist apparatus was included on the airship for launching and recovering the parasite aircraft during flight. Each Akron class ship was built with four individual hangar bays; a fifth aircraft could be stored on the trapeze. In the USS Akron, however, structural girders obstructed the two rearmost hangars, meaning it was capable of accommodating no more than three aircraft when first commissioned. Plans were in place to modify the supports, but the ship was lost before the work could take place.

Each of the aircraft was fitted with a skyhook that latched to a horizontal spar on the trapeze. For launch, the aircraft were hooked on inside the hangar and lowered through a T-shaped opening in the hangar deck. Once below the airship, the pilot would start the engine before detaching the hook from the trapeze. The same process worked in reverse for in-flight recovery. The pilot would match the speed of the airship and carefully latch the skyhook to the trapeze. The aircraft could then be lifted back into the hangar. A second trapeze near the airship's tail allowed a second aircraft to "perch" while waiting for its turn to come aboard. To ease stability and lower lift requirements during the airship's launch, the normal practice was for the airship and its complement of parasite aircraft to depart separately and then to rendezvous once the airship was airborne.

The Akron class also included a spy basket, a small, aerodynamic gondola suspended from the ship by a 3,000-foot (910 m) line, which allowed observation of any enemy formation while the ship remained hidden within cloud cover. The basket could also be used as a lift to retrieve downed pilots.

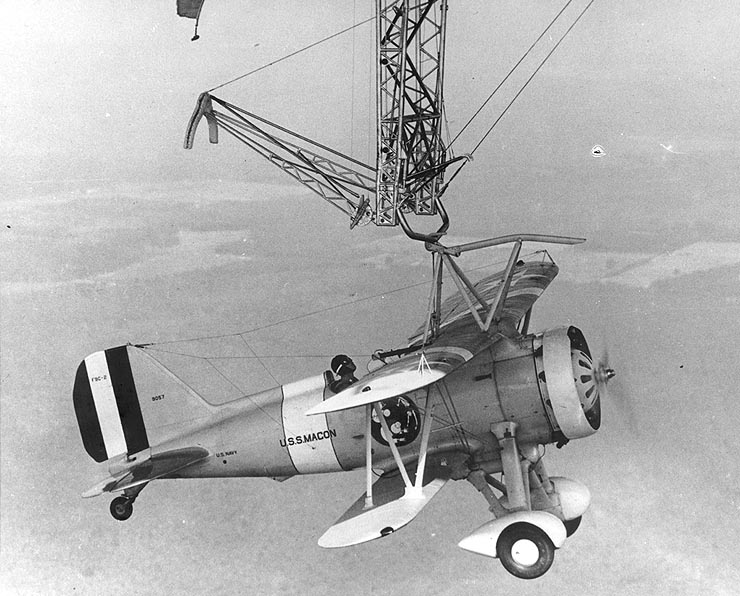
An F9C Sparrowhawk catches the trapeze aboard Macon in 1933

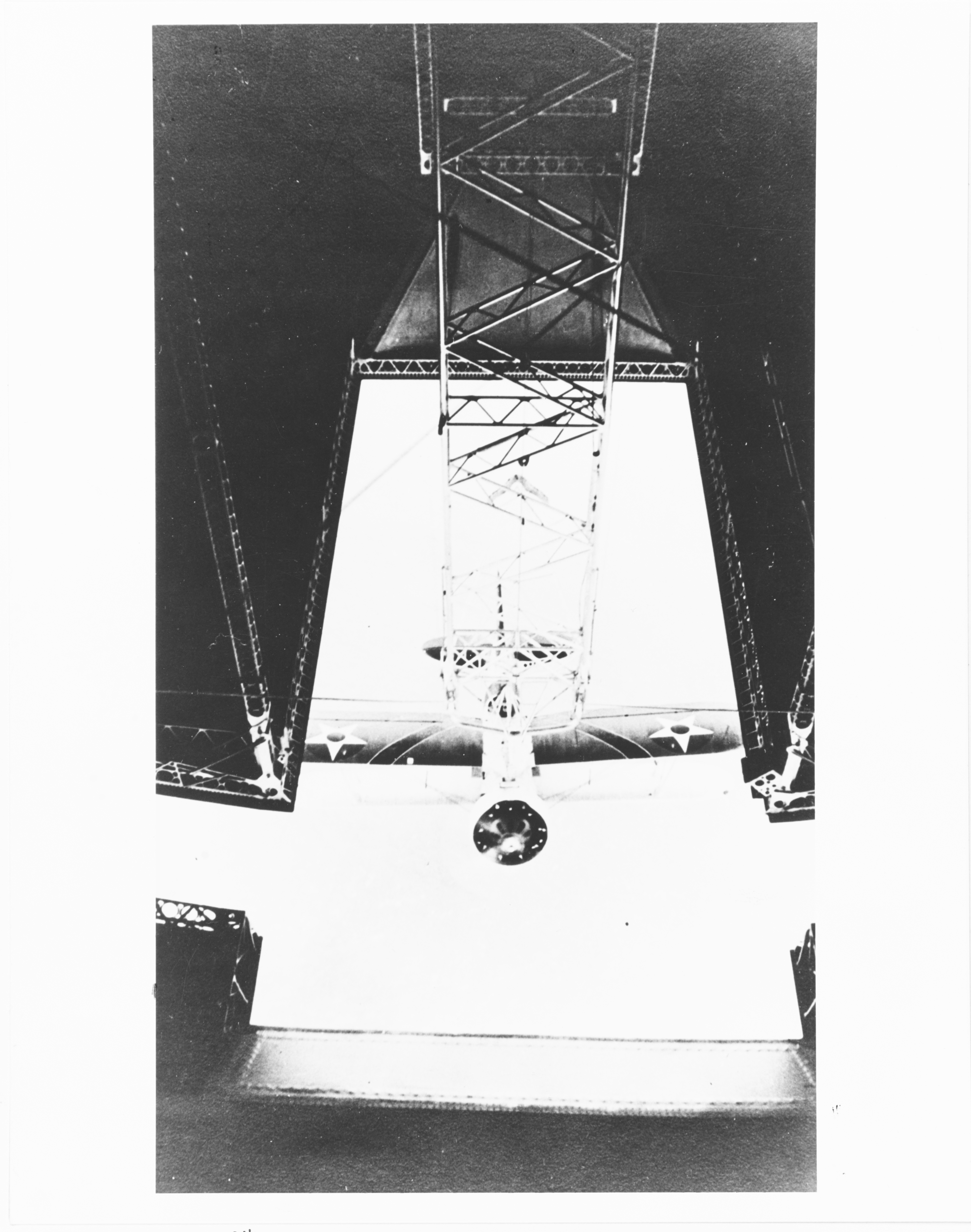
A Sparrowhawk connecting to the trapeze viewed from the Macon's hangar in 1934

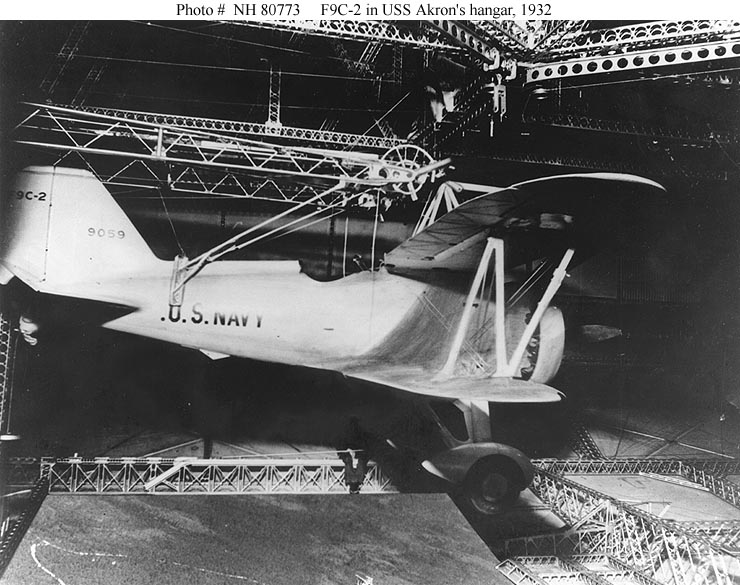
A Sparrowhawk secured in the hangar aboard Akron

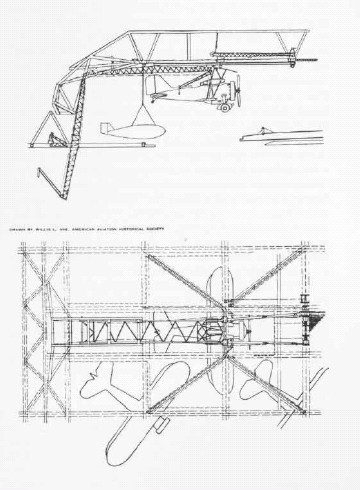
Plan of the hangar, with Sparrowhawk fighters and the spy basket

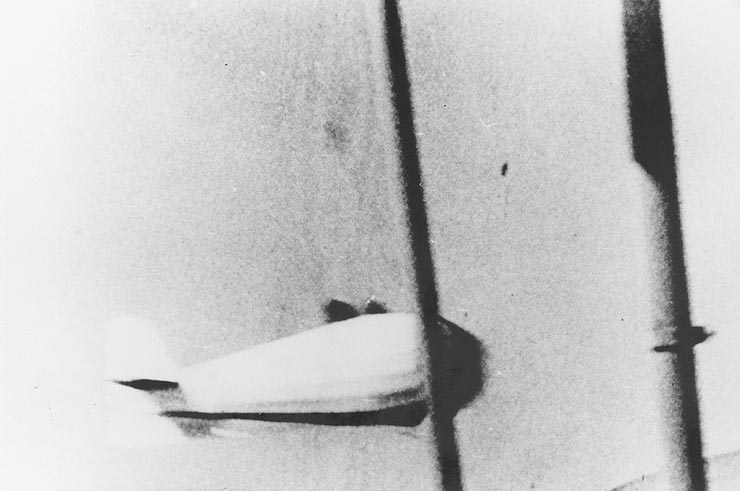
Test of the Macon's spy basket in 1934

== Role and operation ==
Akron operating over Chesapeake Bay in 1932

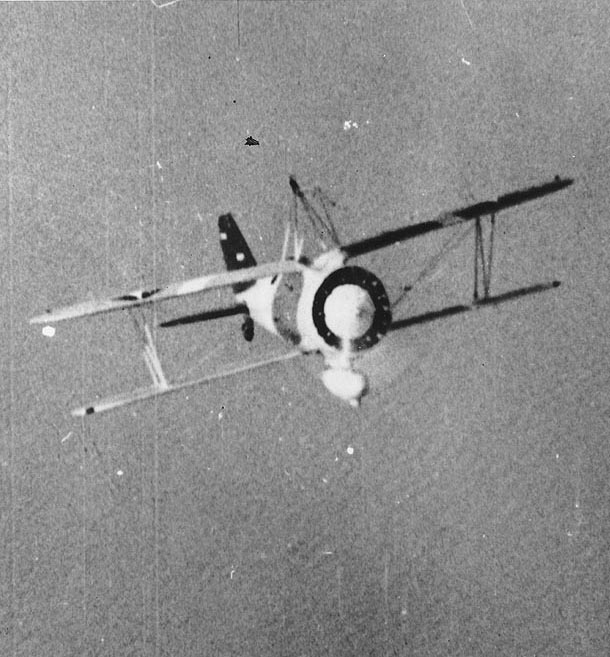
A Sparrowhawk from Macon operating with external fuel tank in place of undercarriage

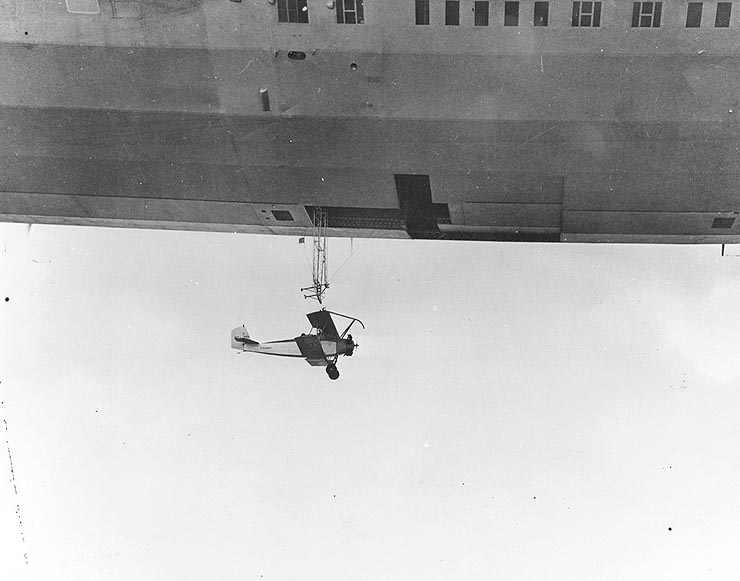
An N2Y aircraft is launched from Akron

The primary role of the Akron class was long-range reconnaissance, with their attainable height, long range and endurance enabling them to patrol far beyond visual range. The addition of onboard airplanes allowed the airship to triple the size of its patrol area. However, there was disagreement over the best use of both the ship and its embarked air group. Initially, the Navy envisaged the air group providing fighter protection for the airship, with the ship undertaking the scouting and thus proceeding right over the enemy. For this reason, the primary aircraft carried was the Curtiss F9C Sparrowhawk, a small biplane fighter armed with a pair of .30 in M1919 machine guns that was more suited to the air defense mission rather than reconnaissance. However, several exercises in 1933 and 1934 showed that the ship itself was extremely vulnerable to attack both by aircraft and shipborne anti-aircraft fire. The Navy, over the objections of many officers such as Charles E. Rosendahl, who had commanded both Los Angeles and Akron, elected to alter the mission of the airship from direct scout to genuine airborne aircraft carrier, leaving the reconnaissance to the air group. This tactical evolution began to be developed using Akron and, after it was lost, continued with Macon. To extend the Sparrowhawk's range, the planes were modified to accommodate an additional external fuel tank, capable of carrying up to 30 US gallons (110 L). The installation of the fuel tank, along with RDF equipment, led to suggestions that the aircraft could scout an area up to 200 miles in any direction from the ship.

The Sparrowhawk was the primary operational aircraft carried by the Akron class airships, but two other types were used regularly. The Fleet N2Y-1 two-seat trainer was used as the primary training aircraft for new pilots to practice using the trapeze; it was also the initial utility aircraft used to fly personnel to and from the ship as required. In 1934, these were supplemented by a pair of modified Waco UBF two-seaters, redesignated as XJW-1s.

== Ships ==
When the Bureau of Aeronautics first conceived its plan for a pair of new, large, purpose-built airships, it envisaged having one stationed on each coast, with facilities set up at NAS Sunnyvale (later NAS Moffett Field) in California and NAS Lakehurst in New Jersey. However, the two ships of the Akron-class never had the opportunity to serve together, as Akron was lost just over three weeks after the launch of Macon.

Two Akron class airships were built by the Goodyear–Zeppelin Corporation under a fixed-price contract from the Bureau of Aeronatutics at a total cost of $7.825 million (equivalent to $142 million in 2025) — $5.375 million for the Akron and $2.45 million for the Macon between 1929 and 1933.

Name	Hull number	Builder	Ordered	Laid down	Launched	Commissioned	Fate
Akron	ZRS-4	Goodyear–Zeppelin Corporation	24 June 1926	31 October 1929	8 August 1931	27 October 1931	Crashed off coast of New Jersey, 4 April 1933
Macon	ZRS-5	Goodyear–Zeppelin Corporation	24 June 1926	1 May 1931	11 March 1933	23 June 1933	Crashed off Point Sur, California, 12 February 1935

Despite the loss of both the Akron and Macon in crashes, Naval officials remained interested in continuing the program. A five-year airship program, covering 1937 to 1941 and costing $16.75 million, called for the construction of two further Akron class ZRS rigid airships and six non-rigid airships, along with a smaller rigid airship (designated ZRN) for training purposes. Only the 650-foot (200 m) ZRN was proposed for funding, but President Roosevelt, who wanted the Navy to invest in long-range patrol aircraft instead of rigid airships, intervened ordering that any new airship be limited to 350 feet (110 m) in length and terminating the ZRN project.

=== Akron ===
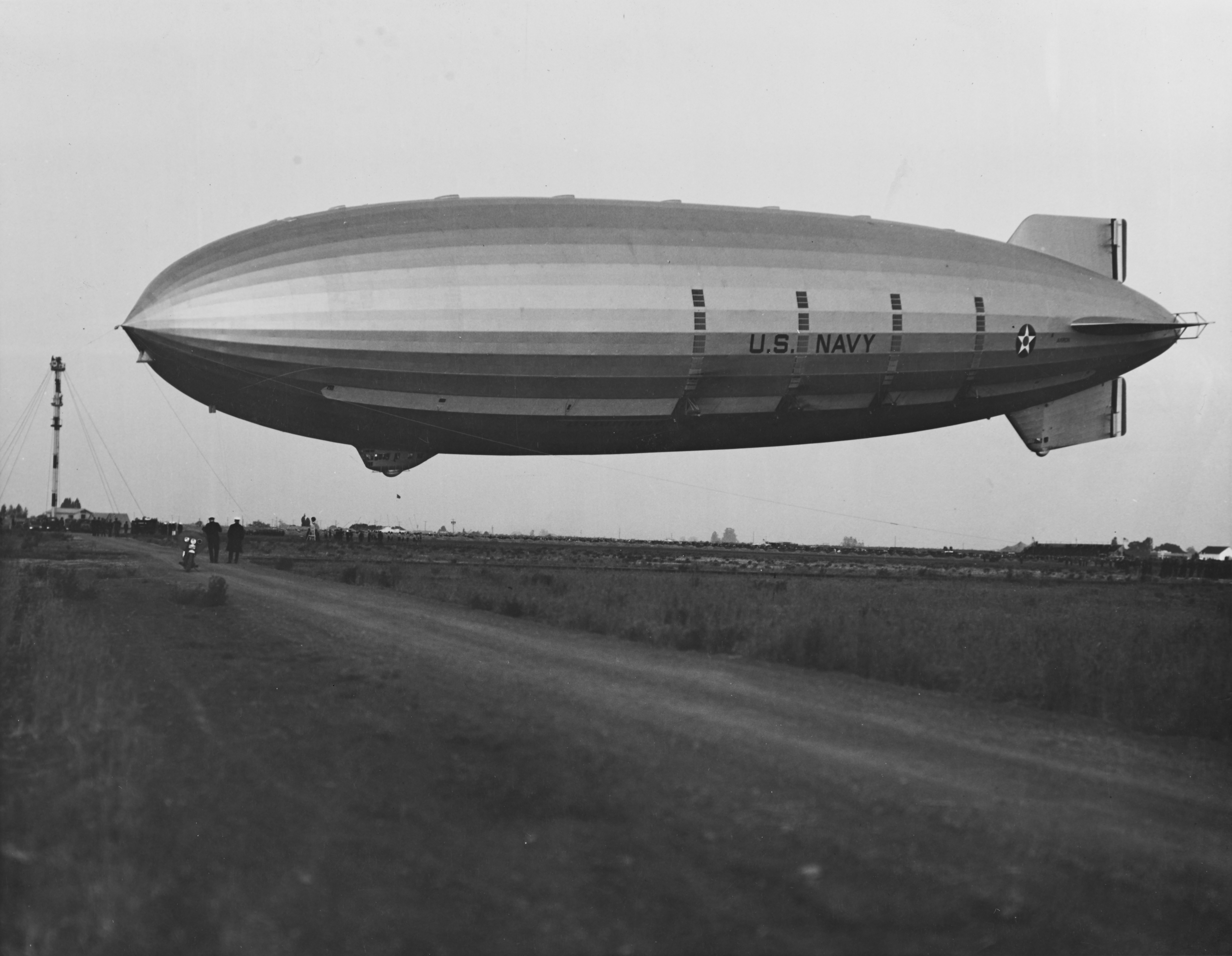
Akron approaches the mooring mast at NAS Sunnyvale in May 1932

Work on Akron commenced on 7 November 1929 at the Goodyear Airdock. The ship was christened on 8 August 1931 by the First Lady, Lou Henry Hoover, undertook her first flight trial on 23 September, and was commissioned on 27 October. Between November 1931 and January 1932, Akron undertook training flights before proceeding on its first mission with the Scouting Fleet off the coast of the Carolinas on 9 January 1932. On 22 February, the ship was damaged while being removed from the hangar at Lakehurst, which led to it missing the 1932 fleet problem exercise in the Pacific. On 3 May, Akron used the aircraft trapeze for the first time, before flying from Lakehurst to San Diego. From 1–4 June, Akron exercised with the Scouting Fleet off the coast of California, before returning to the east coast. The remainder of the year was spent in maintenance, and flight testing of the ship's new air group to develop the tactics for its use. In early March 1933, Akron was used as part of President Roosevelt's inauguration ceremony. On 3 April, the ship left Lakehurst to engage in the calibration of radio direction finders in New England. The ship was caught in a storm off the coast of New Jersey and crashed just after midnight on 4 April, killing 73 people on board, including Rear Admiral William Moffett, the Chief of the Bureau of Aeronautics.

=== Macon ===
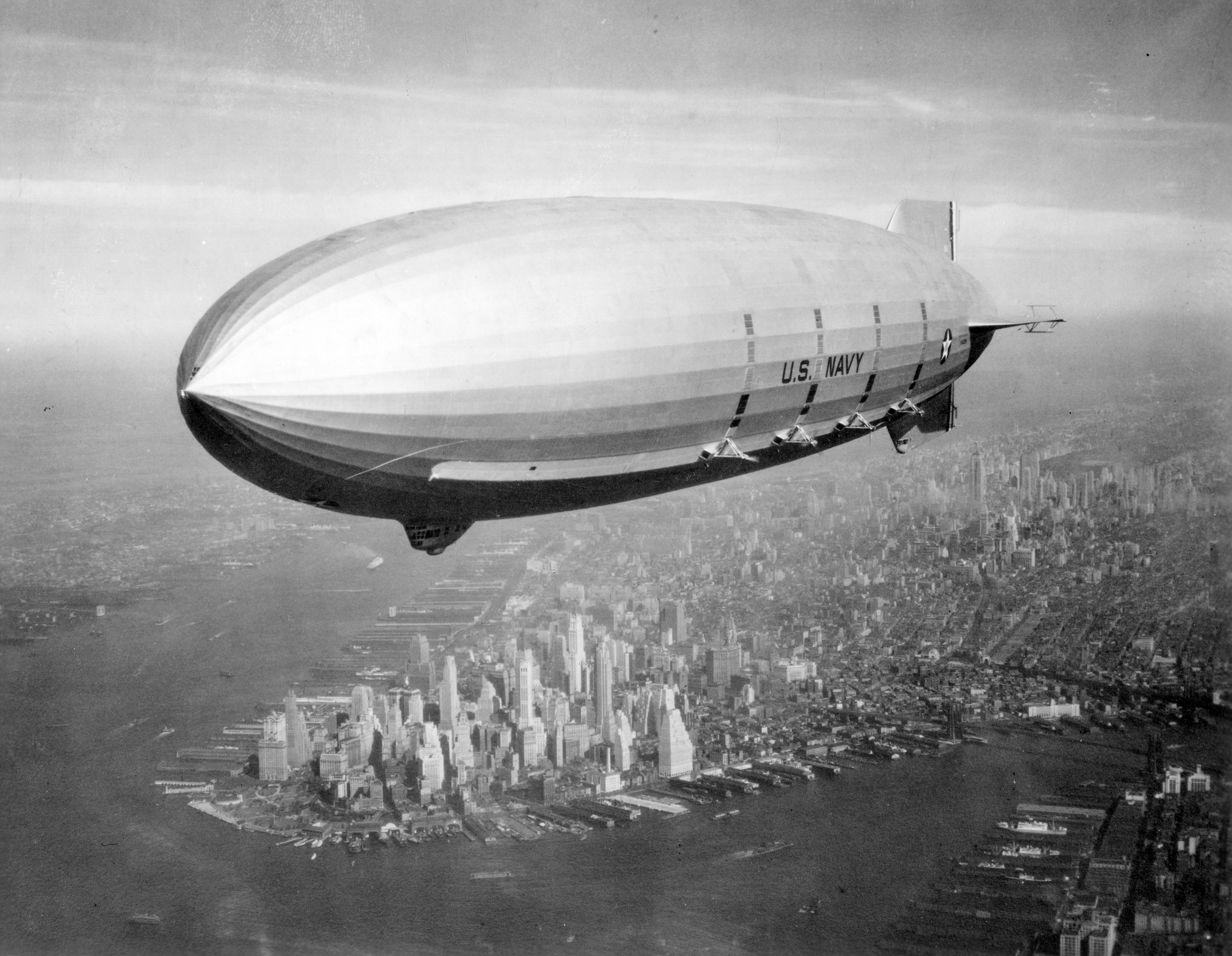
Macon cruising over Manhattan in mid-1933

Construction of Macon commenced at the Goodyear Airdock in October 1931, once Akron had been handed over to the US Navy. It was christened on 11 March 1933 by the wife of Rear Admiral Moffett, before undertaking its first flight trial on 21 April. Macon was commissioned on 23 June, before departing for Lakehurst the same day. On 7 July, while cruising along Long Island Sound, the ship's air group came aboard for the first time. On 12 October, the ship departed Lakehurst for the transit flight to NAS Moffett Field in California, which was planned as the ship's permanent home base. Between November 1933 and January 1934, Macon undertook a number of exercises with the fleet, being "shot down" on many occasions by both carrier-based aircraft and anti-aircraft fire. In May, the ship returned to the east coast to participate in the 1934 fleet problem. In July, it undertook a training mission that included an attempt to intercept a pair of cruisers, including USS Houston, which was taking President Roosevelt on vacation to Hawaii. For the remainder of 1934, the ship undertook exercises, including the first use of new tactics that saw the ship used as an aircraft carrier, with its aircraft undertaking the reconnaissance mission. In this exercise, aircraft from Macon were able to locate the aircraft carrier USS Saratoga and keep her under surveillance for several hours. Macon was also able to show its versatility by being able to mark the position of the crews of two aircraft lost at sea until they could be rescued. In early 1935, the ship participated in further exercises until, on 12 February, while returning to Moffett Field, having lost one of her stabilizers, it made a forced landing in the sea off Point Sur, sinking with the loss of two of her crew.

== ZRCV ==
The evolution of the rigid airship as an aircraft carrier, as was done with the Macon, led to naval planners considering the use of airships as offensive weapons with an air group of dive bombers. The ZRCV concept, which planned for a 9.55 million ft^{3} (270,000 m^{3}) rigid airship — significantly larger than the Akron class — capable of carrying up to nine Douglas-Northrop BT-1 dive bombers. However, the loss of Macon in February 1935, combined with President Roosevelt ordering a limitation on the size of new airships, meant ZRCV was never more than an idea.
