= Goodyear Airdock =

Ohio airship hangar completed 1929

- U.S. National Register of Historic Places
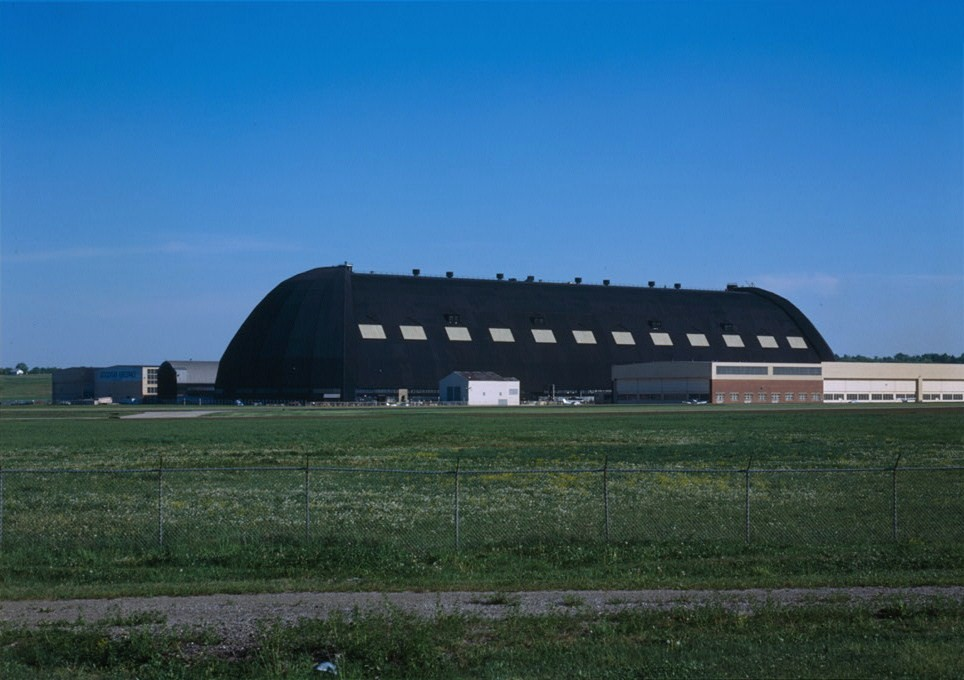
- The Goodyear Airdock

- Location within Ohio Location within the United States
- Location: S side of the Akron Fulton International Airport, Akron, Ohio
- Coordinates: 41°1′55″N 81°28′15″W
- Built: 1929/30
- Architect: Karl Arnstein, Paul K. Helma, Wilbur J. Watson
- NRHP reference No.: 73002259
- Added to NRHP: April 11, 1973

The Goodyear Airdock is an airship construction and storage hangar in Akron, Ohio. At its completion in 1929, it was the largest building in the world without interior supports.

== Description ==
The building has a unique shape which has been described as "half a silkworm's cocoon." It is 1,175 feet (358 m) long, 325 feet (99 m) wide, and 211 feet (64 m) high, supported by 13 steel arches. There is 364,000 square feet (34 000 m^{2}) of unobstructed floor space; an area larger than 8 football fields side-by-side. The airdock has a volume of 55 million cubic feet (~1.5 million cubic meters). A control tower and radio aerial sit at its northeast end. At each end of the building are two semi-spherical doors that each weigh 600 tons (544 000 kg). At the top, the doors are fastened by hollow forged pins 17 inches (43 cm) in diameter and six feet (1.8 m) long. The doors roll on 40 wheels along specially designed curved railroad tracks, each powered by an individual power plant that can open the doors in about 5 minutes.

The airdock is so large that temperature changes within the structure can be very different from that on the outside of the structure. To accommodate these fluctuations, which could cause structural damage, a row of 12 windows 100 feet (30 m) off the ground was installed. Furthermore, the entire structure is mounted on rollers to compensate for expansion or contraction resulting from temperature changes. When the humidity is high in the Airdock, a sudden change in temperature causes condensation. This condensation falls in a mist, creating the illusion of rain, according to the designer.

== History ==
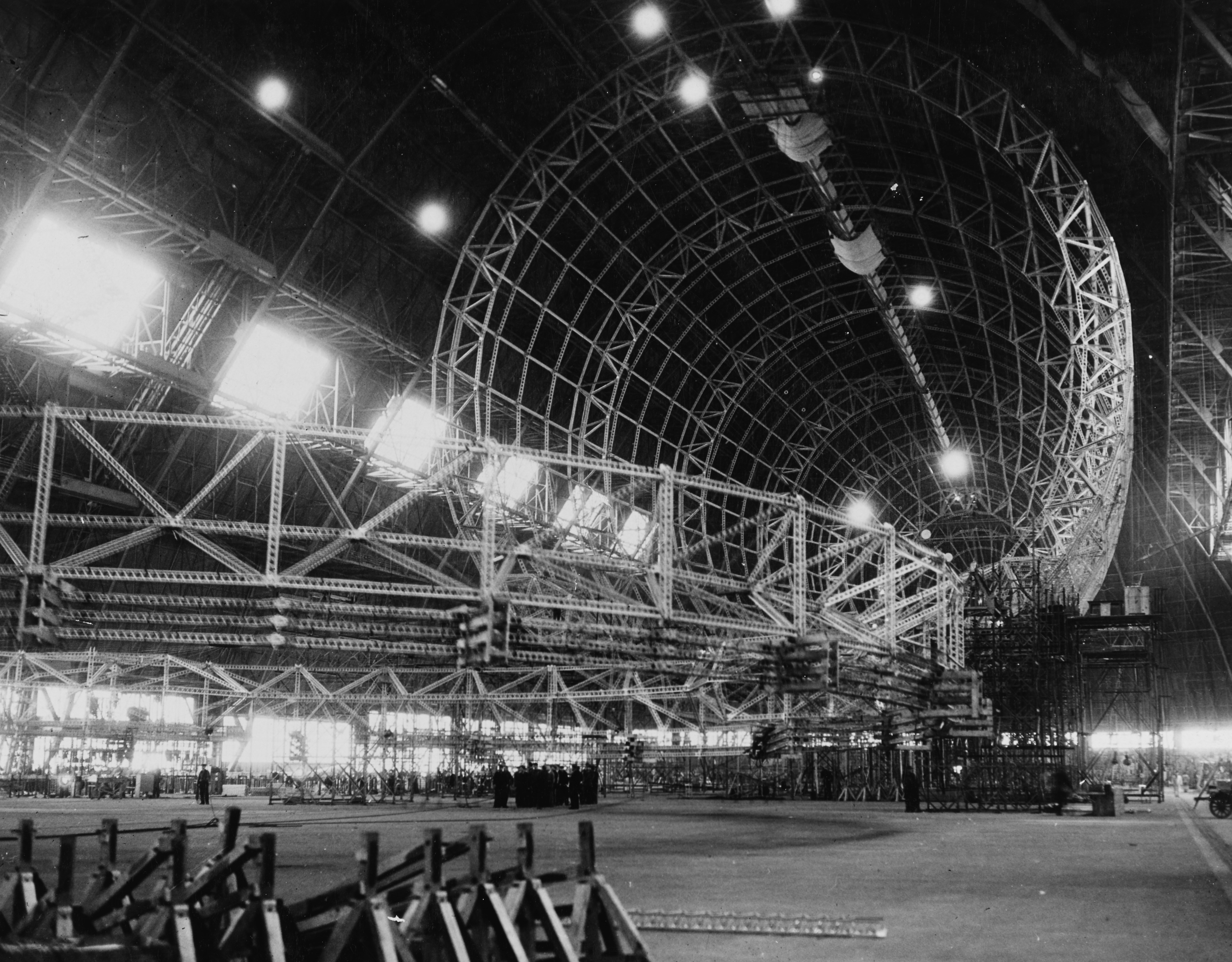
The U.S. Navy airship USS Macon under construction at the Goodyear Airdock in 1932.

In 1929, Goodyear Zeppelin Corporation, later Goodyear Aerospace, sought a structure in which "lighter-than-air" ships (later known as airships, dirigibles, and blimps) could be constructed. The company commissioned Karl Arnstein of Akron, Ohio, whose design was inspired by the blueprints of the first aerodynamic-shaped airship hangar, built in 1913 in Dresden, Germany.

Construction took place from April 20 to November 25, 1929, at a cost of $2.2 million (equivalent to $31.55 million in 2024).

The first two airships to be constructed and launched at the airdock were USS Akron, in 1931, and its sister ship, USS Macon.

When World War II broke out, enclosed production areas were desperately needed, and the airdock was used for building airships. The last airship built in the airdock was the U.S. Navy's ZPG-3W in 1960. The building later housed the photographic division of the Goodyear Aerospace Corporation.

In 1980, the Goodyear Airdock was designated a Historic Civil Engineering Landmark by the American Society of Civil Engineers.

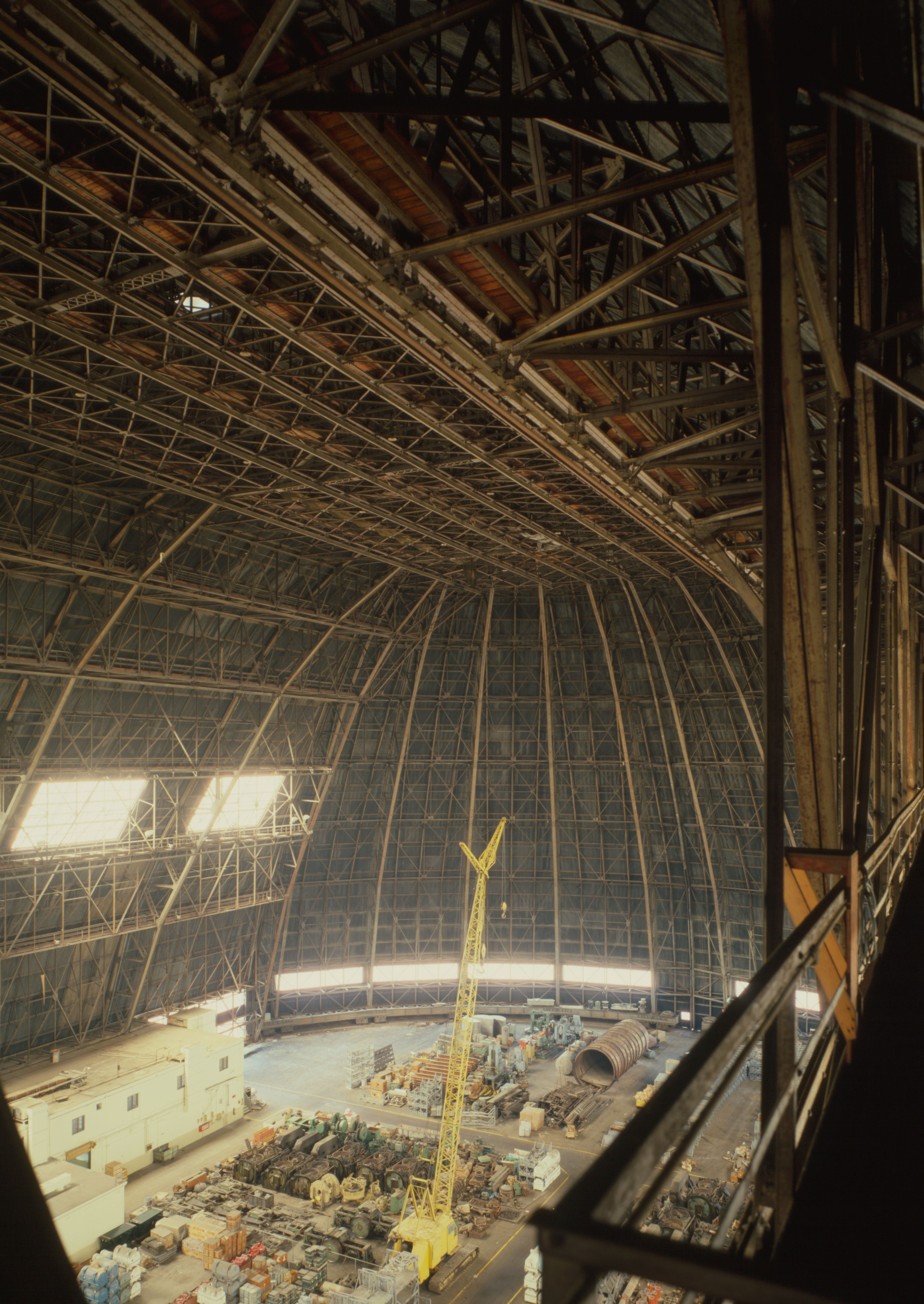
Interior of the Goodyear Airdock, May 1985

The airdock served as the site of the 1986 kickoff rally for the United Way of Summit County, where more than 350,000 members of the public visited. Bill Clinton spoke there during his 1992 election campaign.

In 1987, the Loral Corporation purchased Goodyear Aerospace and the Goodyear Airdock as a result of James Goldsmith's greenmailing of Goodyear. The Loral Corporation (and its holdings, including the Goodyear Airdock) was purchased by Lockheed Martin in 1996.

As of 2021 California company LTA Research and Exploration, together with the University of Akron, plans to use the airdock to develop electric-powered airships.

The airdock is not open to the public, but it can be seen by those traveling on U.S. Route 224 southeast of downtown Akron.

== See also ==
- Airship hangar
- Hangar No. 1, Lakehurst Naval Air Station
- Hangar One (Mountain View, California)
- Weeksville Dirigible Hangar
- Bartolomeu de Gusmão Airport
- MCAS Tustin
