= ZWG =

ZWG may refer to:

- Goodyear ZWG, ZW Airborne Early Warning Airship
- Zimbabwean ZiG, also known as Zimbabwe Gold, the currency of Zimbabwe since 2024
