= Goodyear Meteor Junior =

Reusable spacecraft concept

Meteor Junior
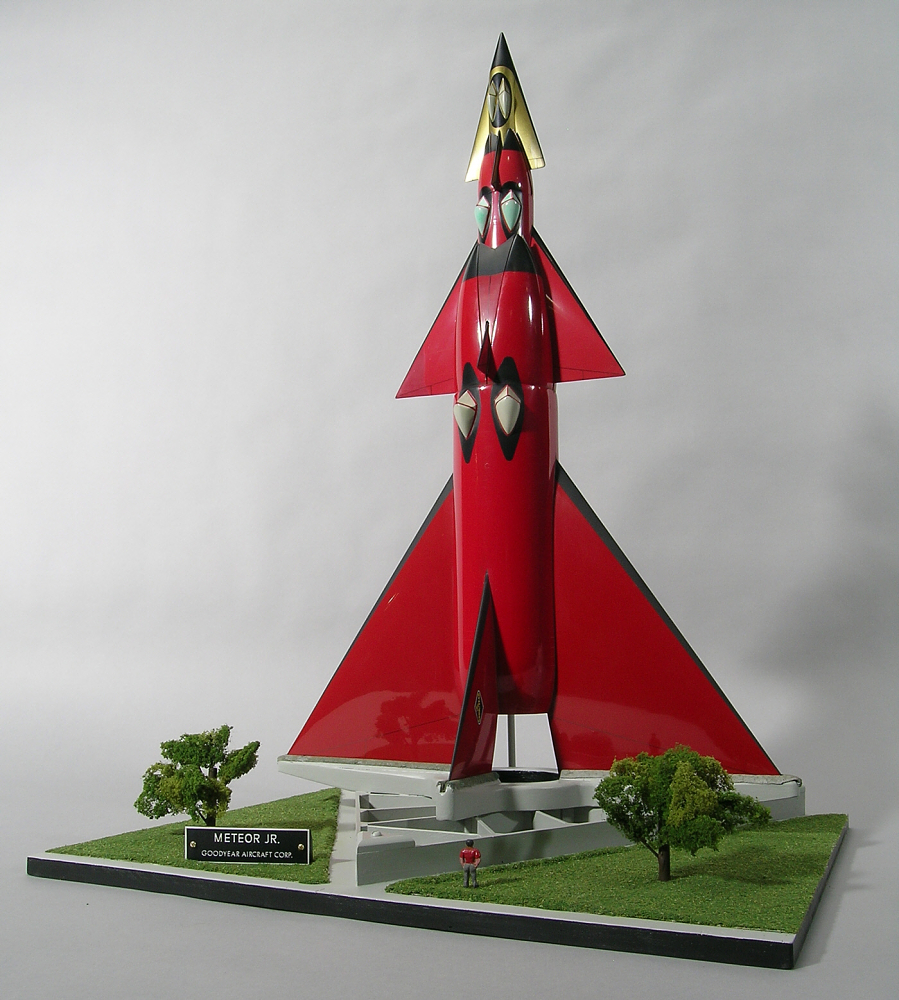
- Model at the Smithsonian Institution
- Manufacturer: Goodyear Aerospace
- Designer: Darrell C. Romick
- Country of origin: United States
- Applications: Manned spaceflight

The Goodyear Meteor Junior was a 1954 concept for a fully reusable spacecraft and launch system designed by Darrell C. Romick and two of his colleagues employed by Goodyear Aerospace, a subsidiary of the American Goodyear Tire and Rubber Company. Darrell Romick originally estimated that the craft would cost about the same as an intercontinental B-52 bomber.

== Concept ==
The concept was introduced in 1954, before the dawn of human spaceflight, to be displayed at the annual conference of the American Rocket Society. The design called for a winged spacecraft piloted by a crew of three. The craft was to contain three stages, of which only the uppermost, containing the crew, would ultimately be propelled to orbit around Earth. Each of these three stages was to contain landing gear and a crew of its own, allowing the stages to be piloted to a landing to be reused in a future launch. For reentry and landing, the nose of each stage had a mechanism that would allow the nose to close into a point.

The craft would have been 142 ft (43 m) long, and would weigh 500 tons. The craft itself would have been impractically massive for the time period; however, the design ignited public interest in that it was an early concept for a reusable vehicle to transport crew and cargo to space and back, and was the subject of an article in the December 1957 issue of Popular Science magazine.

The original concept envisioned the craft launching from the White Sands Missile Range. At a downrange distance of 300 mi (480 km) and an altitude of 24 mi (39 km), the first stage would separate from the craft. At 1,000 mi (1,600 km) downrange, the second stage would separate at an altitude of 41 mi (66 km). After launch was completed, the third stage/crew compartment would orbit the Earth at an altitude of 500 mi (800 km) at a velocity of 16,660 miles per hour (26,810 km/h), where it would stay for approximately two months before returning to Earth.
