= ZRCV =

Proposed aircraft carrier

The ZRCV was a large dirigible aircraft carrier proposed by the Lighter-than-Air Bureau of the United States Department of the Navy and the Goodyear-Zeppelin Corporation. It would have been a 9.55-million-cubic-foot (270,000 m^{3}) airship designed to carry nine Douglas-Northrop BT–1 dive bombers.

Building the ZRCV became impossible when the Roosevelt administration, which wanted greater investment in long-range patrol aircraft, placed an upper limit of 350 feet (110 m) in length for any new rigid airships.

== Origin of name ==
Previous Navy airships had used the designation "ZR" (Zeppelin Rigid), which was combined with the designation for aircraft carriers, "CV" (Carrier aViation).

== Design ==
Like the Akron-class airships that preceded it, the ZRCV was designed as an aerial aircraft carrier. With a complement of nine BT–1 dive bombers, the ship would have required a strong keel and design more in line with conventional Zeppelins than the Akron-class airships. The ship was designed at 897 feet (273 m) with a diameter of 148 feet (45 m). With a gas volume of 9.55 million cubic feet (270,000 m^{3}), the ZRCV would have had a gross lift weight of 592,000 pounds (269,000 kg) with a dead weight of 295,000 pounds (134,000 kg). The design called for eight 750 hp engines arranged in four pairs, each of which would drive a single four-bladed propeller. Like the Akron-class airships, a complement of 60 sailors were expected to fly the ship. Fully laden with nine bombers weighing 6,000 pounds (2,700 kg) each, the ZRCV was expected to have an endurance of 175 hours at 50 knots (58 mph; 93 km/h) and an ultimate range of 8,750 nautical miles (10,070 mi; 16,200 km).

== ZRCCN and ZRCVN ==
In the early 1970s, a Naval Research Lab report proposed reviving the Navy's lighter-than-air program with an updated, nuclear-powered version of the ZRCV. Dubbed the ZRCCN, the proposed airship would be substantially larger than the ZRCV with a length of 1,000 feet (300 m) and diameter of 200 feet (61 m). With a gas volume of 22 million cubic feet (620,000 m^{3}), the ZRCCN would have a gross lift of 1.36 million pounds (620,000 kg). The report envision equipping the airship with an 18,000 kW nuclear reactor to power propulsion system to provide practically unlimited range with a cruising speed of 80 miles per hour (70 kn; 130 km/h) at an altitude of 5,000 feet (1,500 m) and a cargo of up to 65,000 pounds (29,000 kg). Such an airship could be used as a troop transport or for large loads of matériel. The main limitation on operations would be connected to radiation levels and exposure in the passenger area.

The report also suggested developing a strategic bombing platform using two ZRCCNs connected by a wing section and helicopter-type rotors with 800 feet (240 m) separation between the airship hulls. This configuration, dubbed ZRCVN, would require a 63,000 kW reactor. This ship could carry 75–100 aircraft, making use of hangar space in the wing.

== Sources ==
- Clements, E. W.; O'Hara, G. J. (1972). The Navy Rigid Ship (PDF) (NRL-MR-2463). Washington, D.C.: Ocean Technology Division, Naval Research Laboratory.
- Smith, Richard K. (1965). The Airships Akron & Macon: Flying Aircraft carriers of the United States Navy. Annapolis, Maryland: United States Naval Institute Press. ISBN 978-0-87021-065-5.
