= Hangar One (Moffett Federal Airfield) =

Historic structure in Mountain View, California, US

- U.S. Historic district – Contributing property
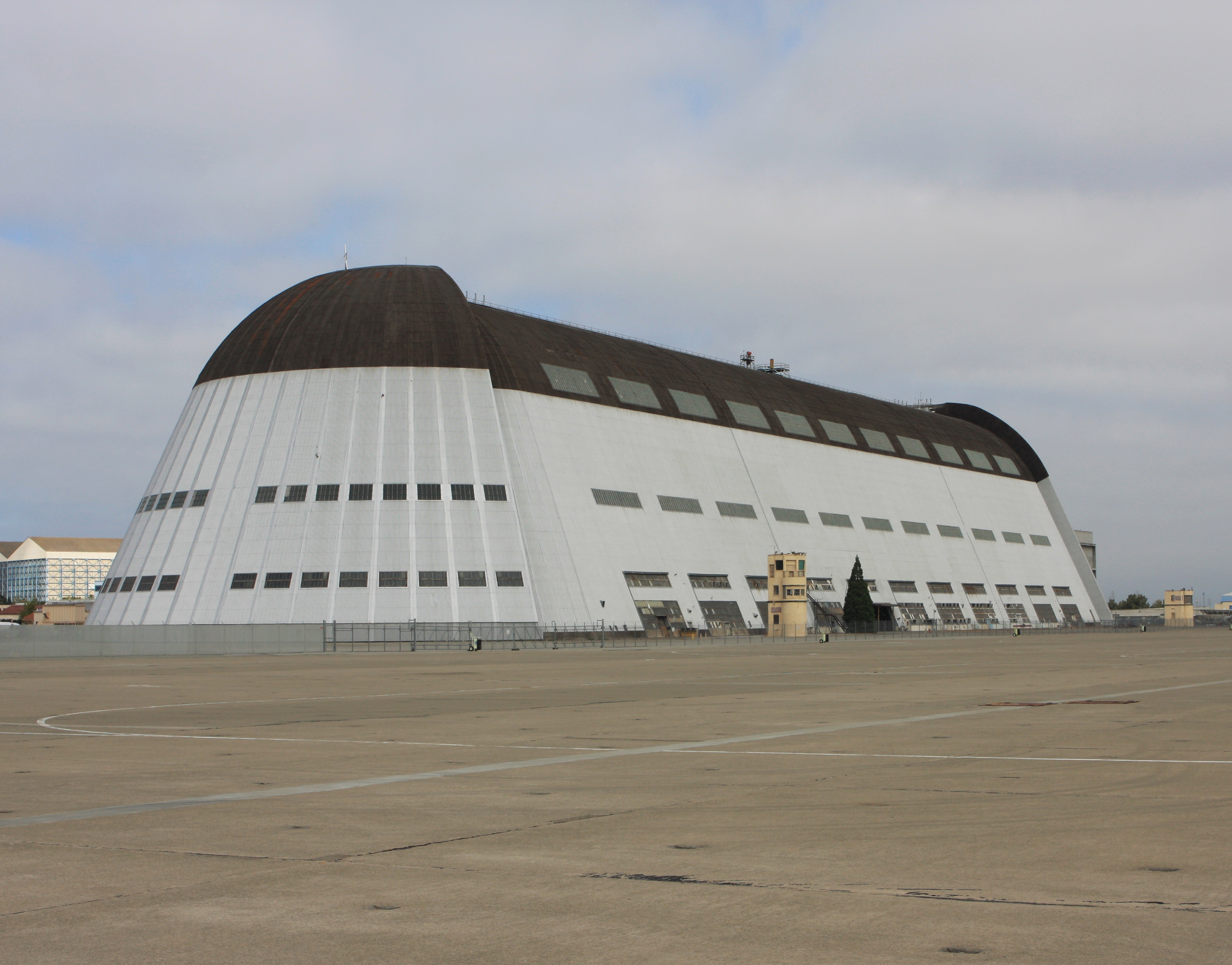
- The hangar in 2009

- Location within San Jose, California Location within California Location within the United States
- Location: Santa Clara County, near Mountain View and Sunnyvale, California, USA
- Coordinates: 37°24′46.47″N 122°03′13.91″W
- Area: 8 acres (32,000 m^{2})
- Built: 1933
- Architect: Dr. Karl Arnstein and Wilbur Watson Associates Architects and Engineers
- Part of: US Naval Air Station Sunnyvale, California, Historic District (ID94000045)
- Designated CP: February 24, 1994

Hangar One is one of the world's largest freestanding structures, covering 8 acres (32,000 m^{2}; 3.2 ha) at Moffett Field near Mountain View, California in the San Francisco Bay Area.

The massive hangar has long been one of the most recognizable landmarks of California's Silicon Valley. It was built in the 1930s as a naval airship hangar for USS Macon and is now part of the NASA Ames Research Center.

== Design and construction ==
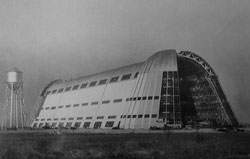
The hangar at its opening in 1933

Designed by German airship and structural engineer Dr. Karl Arnstein, Vice President and Director of Engineering for the Goodyear Zeppelin Corporation of Akron, Ohio, in collaboration with Wilbur Watson Associates Architects and Engineers of Cleveland, Ohio, Hangar One is constructed on a network of steel girders sheathed with galvanized steel. It rests firmly upon a reinforced pad anchored to concrete pilings. The floor covers 8 acres (32,000 m^{2}) and can accommodate six 360-by-160-foot (110 by 50 m) American football fields. The airship hangar measures 1,133 feet (345 m) long and 308 feet (94 m) wide. The building has an aerodynamic architecture. Its walls curve inward to form an elongated approximate catenary form 198 feet (60 m) high. The clam-shell doors were designed to reduce turbulence when Macon moved in and out on windy days. The "orange peel" doors, weighing 200 short tons (180 metric tons) each, are moved by their own 150-horsepower (110 kW) motors operated via an electrical control panel.

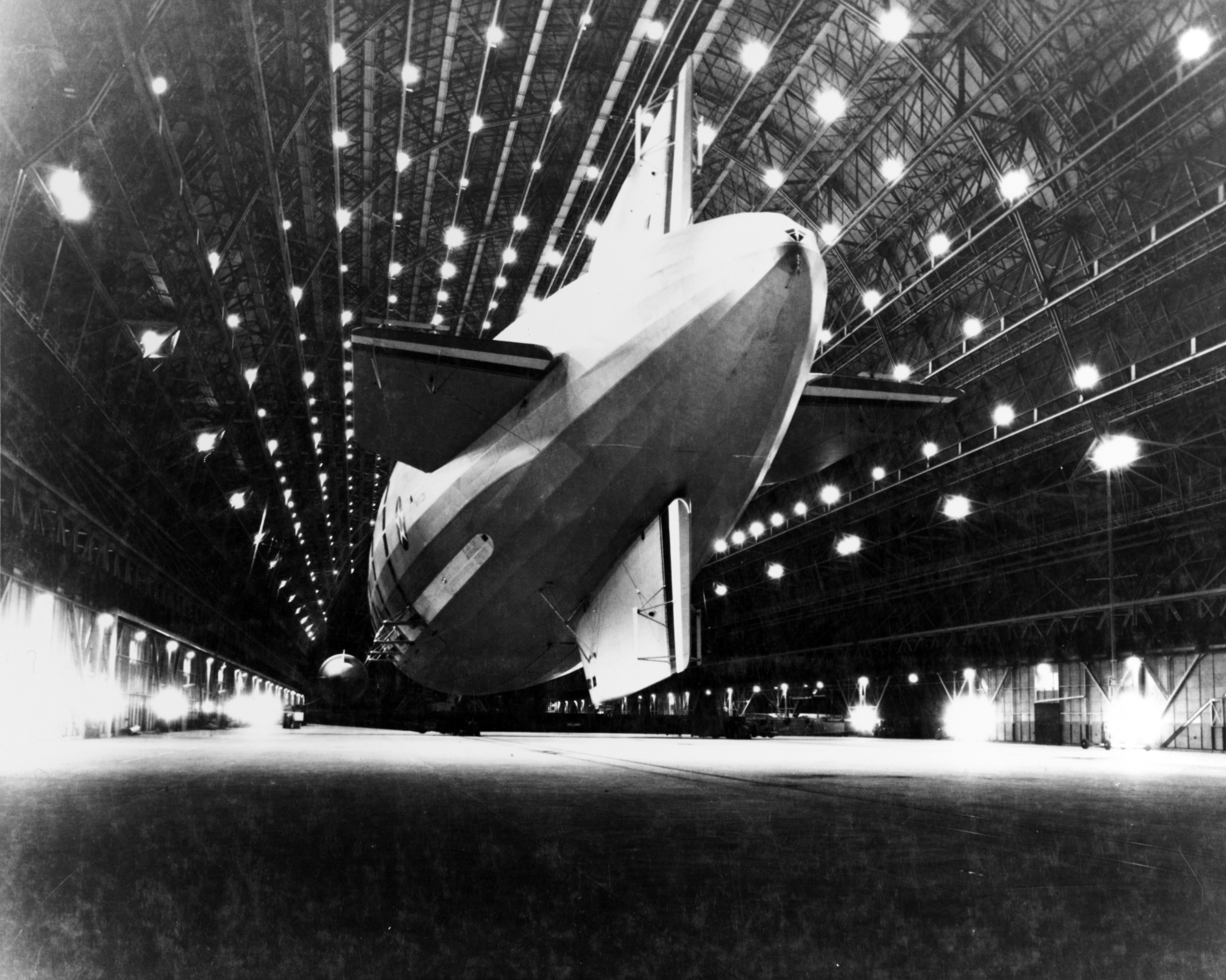
USS Macon in Hangar One on October 15, 1933, following a transcontinental flight from Lakehurst, New Jersey

The hangar's interior is so large that fog sometimes forms near the ceiling.

Standard gauge tracks run through the length of the hangar. During the period of lighter-than-air dirigibles and non-rigid aircraft, the rails extended across the apron and into the fields at each end of the hangar. This tramway facilitated the transportation of an airship on the mooring mast to the hangar interior or to the flight position. During the brief period that Macon was based at Moffett, Hangar One accommodated not only the giant airship but several smaller non-rigid lighter-than-air craft simultaneously.

=== Similar structures ===
Hangar One is similar to the Goodyear Airdock in Akron, Ohio which was built by the Goodyear Zeppelin Corporation in 1929. At the time the Goodyear Airdock was built, the structure, located in Northeast Ohio, was the largest building in the world without interior supports. It provided an unusually extensive room for the construction of "lighter-than-air" ships (airships, dirigibles, or blimps). The first two airships to be constructed and launched at the Goodyear Airdock were Akron and its sister ship, Macon, built in 1931 and 1933, respectively. These two airships were 785 feet (239 m) in length.

Other historic references date back to Europe. An outstanding example are the two hangars d'Orly for dirigibles at Orly Air Base near Paris. They were designed and built in 1921–1922 by French structural and civil engineer Eugène Freyssinet, the major pioneer of prestressed concrete, and destroyed in World War II.

Another remarkable example of a similar concrete construction are the two airplane hangars for the Italian Air Force in Orvieto, Italy, by Italian architect and structural engineer Pier Luigi Nervi, designed in 1935 and built in 1938. They were also destroyed during World War II.

== Restoration ==
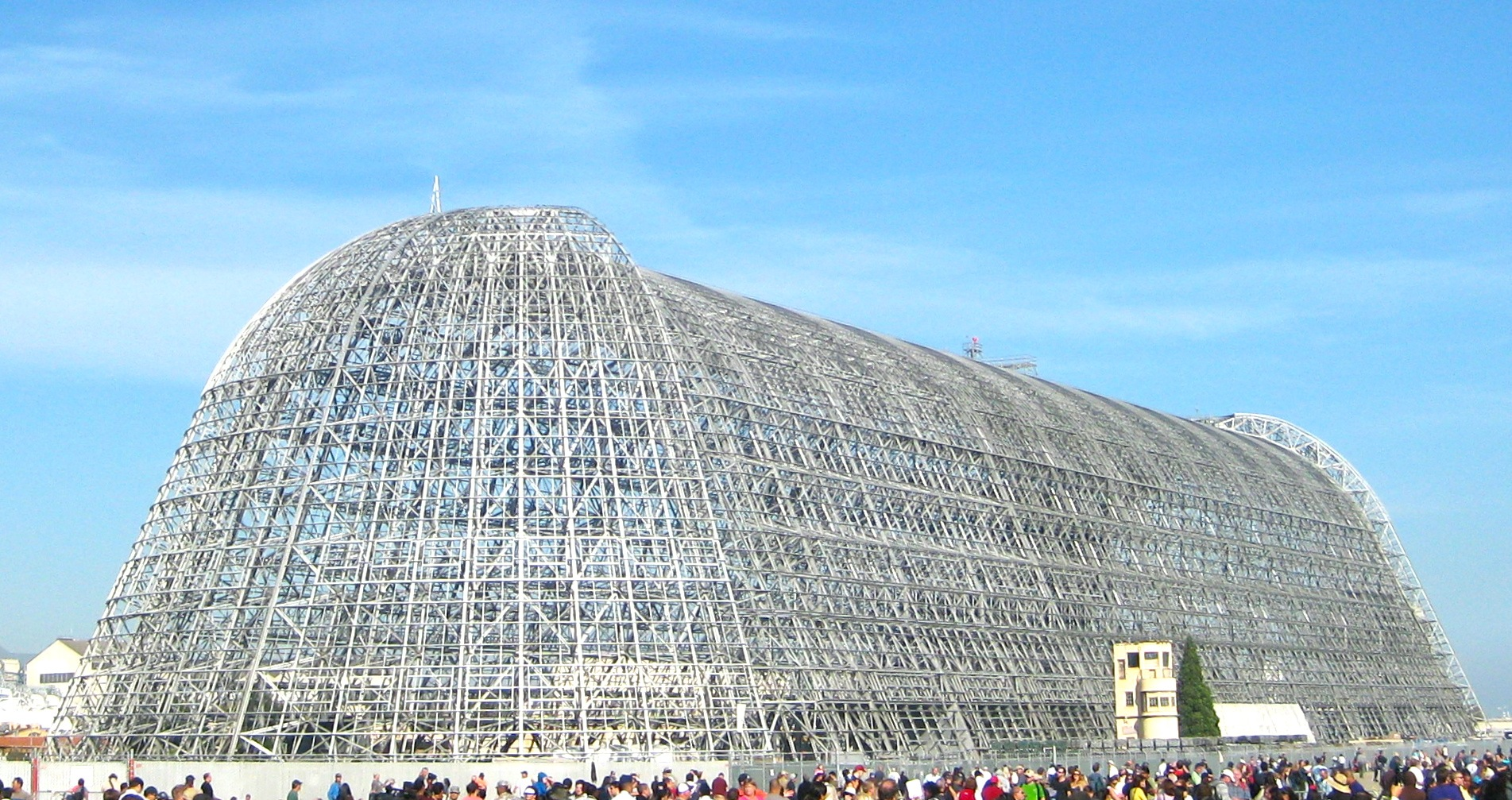
Exterior panels removed, September 2012

On February 24, 1994, the Shenandoah Plaza National Historic District, including Hangar One, was accepted into the National Register of Historic Places.

On May 20, 2008, Hangar One was listed as one of the 11 most endangered historic places in the U.S. by the National Trust for Historic Preservation.

Plans to convert it to a space and science center were put on hold with the discovery in 2003 that the structure was leaking toxic chemicals into the sediment in wetlands bordering San Francisco Bay. The chemicals originated in the lead paint and toxic materials, including polychlorinated biphenyls (PCBs), used to coat the hangar. Proposed options included tearing down the hangar and reusing the land, or cleaning the toxic waste from the site and refurbishing the hangar for future preservation. An offer to clean the hangar and coat its outsides with solar panels to recoup the costs of cleaning was proposed by a private company, but the plan never saw fruition due to its cost.

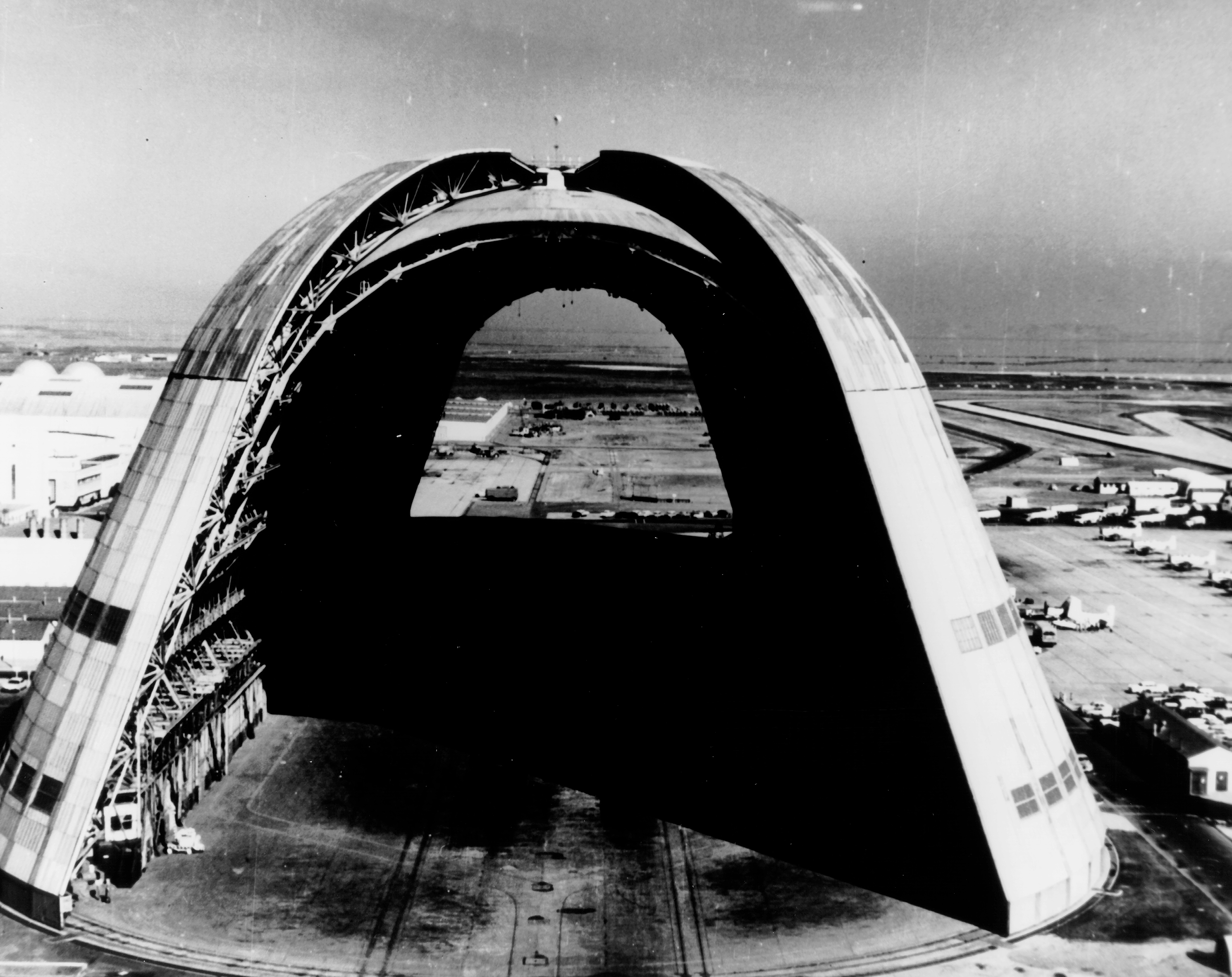
Hangar One with opened orange peel doors, 1963

In December 2010, the Navy began remediating the PCBs, lead and asbestos, and NASA was evaluating options for reuse of the hangar. There was an overwhelming desire from the local community for the hangar to be preserved as a historic landmark, as the hangar is a major Bay Area landmark and historic site. In April 2011, after months of planning and preparation, work to remove the exterior panels began, requiring "the biggest scaffolding job in the history of the West Coast." The work was completed in mid-2012.

In October 2011, Google top executives Larry Page, Sergey Brin and Eric Schmidt proposed paying the full $33 million (equivalent to $45.3 million in 2025) cost of revamping Hangar One, in exchange for being able to use up to two-thirds of the floor space to shelter eight of their private jets.

In 2014, NASA and the General Services Administration selected Planetary Ventures (a subsidiary of Google) to manage Hangar One and Moffett airfield, and Google will pay $1.16 billion over 60 years for the lease.

In May 2016, Google announced that it is prepared to begin testing different techniques to remove the toxic chemicals from the hangar. In May 2017, it was announced that the restoration of the hangar would be completed in 2025.

Hangar One’s restoration was reported as completed in December 2025, and its completion celebrated in March 2026.

== In literature and the arts ==
Hangar One is featured in scenes in the American film Here Comes the Navy.

== See also ==
- Hangar No. 1, Lakehurst Naval Air Station
- Weeksville Dirigible Hangar
- Tropical Islands Resort, housed inside the Aerium airship hangar at Brand-Briesen Airfield, Halbe, Germany
- Goodyear Airdock
- Bartolomeu de Gusmão Airport
- Marine Corps Air Station Tustin
- Tillamook Air Museum
- Cardington Airfield
