= Goodyear ZWG =

American cancelled AEW airship project

General information
- Type: Airship
- National origin: United States
- Manufacturer: Goodyear Aircraft Corporation
- Designer: Goodyear
- Status: Cancelled
- Primary user: United States Navy

The Goodyear ZWG is classified as a ZW Airborne Early Warning Airship. The ZWG-1, designed specifically for the national early warning network mission, was ordered but was subsequently replaced by a much-modified ZPG design as the ZPG-3W.

== Development ==
In 1947 The ZWG designation was added in the naming scheme for airships. In 1955 there was increased interest in the use of nonrigid airships as part of the national early warning network. The ZWG-1, designed specifically for this mission, was ordered but was subsequently replaced by a much-modified ZPG design as the ZPG-3W.

== Specifications Goodyear ZWG ==
General characteristics Performance

Related development N class blimp
