= Goodyear Aerospace =

Defunct subsidiary of Goodyear (1924-87)

Goodyear Aerospace Corporation
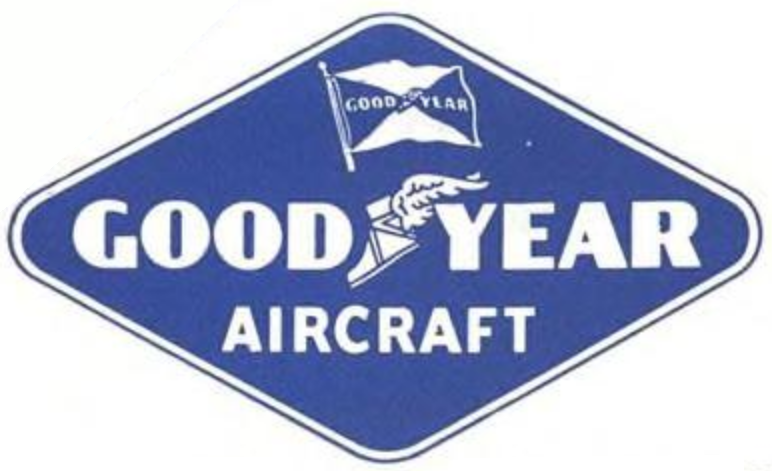
- Industry: Aerospace
- Predecessor: Goodyear Zeppelin Corporation
- Founded: 1924
- Defunct: 1987
- Fate: Bought by Loral Corporation for $640 million in 1987
- Headquarters: Akron, Ohio, United States
- Key people: Karl Arnstein
- Parent: Goodyear Tire and Rubber Company

Goodyear Aerospace Corporation (GAC) was the aerospace and defense subsidiary of the Goodyear Tire and Rubber Company. The company was originally operated as a division within Goodyear as the Goodyear Zeppelin Corporation, part of a joint project with Luftschiffbau Zeppelin, leading to the development of rigid airships in the United States. As part of the failing relationship between the US and Germany in the era prior to World War II, the division was spun off as Goodyear Aircraft Company in 1939. The company opened a new factory in Arizona in 1941 which produced subassemblies, including subcontracted airframe construction and the design of the Goodyear F2G Corsair and Goodyear Duck.

In the post-war era, the division began to diversify and made major contributions to the development of synthetic aperture radar. In 1963 they became Goodyear Aerospace, with major product lines in radar, aircraft canopies, bulletproof glass, a number of spacecraft related products, and the unique Goodyear Inflatoplane. A 1986 hostile takeover attempt of the parent company by James Goldsmith led to a massive restructuring to build capital to buy Goldsmith out. Goodyear Aerospace was sold to Loral in 1987, which in turn sold their non-satellite operations with the defense products purchased by Lockheed Martin in 1993.

== History ==
=== Early years ===
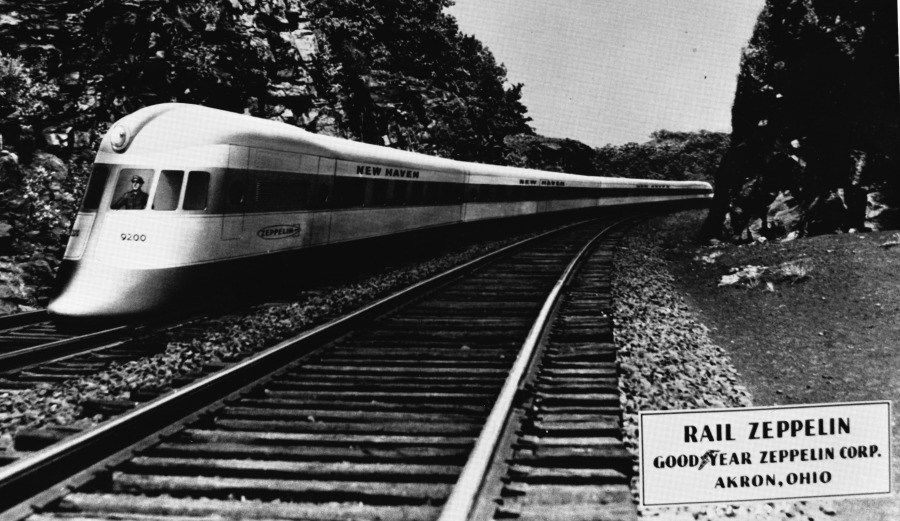
Postcard showing a "Rail Zeppelin" Goodyear Zeppelin Corporation, Akron Ohio

Goodyear's aerospace operations began with the Goodyear Tire & Rubber Co.’s Aeronautics Department. As part of the settling of war reparations with Germany after World War I, the German airship industry was reduced and Zeppelin operations forbidden. In 1924, Goodyear formed a joint interest company with the German Luftschiffbau Zeppelin company, of which Goodyear held 2/3 and the Zeppelin company 1/3 interest. This Goodyear Zeppelin Corporation was able to use Zeppelin's patents, and a number of German engineers and technical staff moved to the US. The chief engineer of the Zeppelin company, Karl Arnstein, became the "Vice-President of Engineering" The company subsequently constructed rigid (zeppelins) and non-rigid (blimps) dirigibles for the US military. Goodyear's giant hangar was constructed where the huge rigid airships for the US Navy, including the USS Akron and USS Macon were constructed.

=== Wartime aircraft manufacturing ===
Also due to the lack of business during the depression, the company used its advanced aeronautical knowledge to design and build the high speed Comet streamlined train for the route between Boston and Providence. It became Goodyear Aircraft Corporation on December 5, 1939 in response to a contract from the Glenn L. Martin Company to design and build the empennage section for its new plane, the B-26 Marauder. The army had placed a large order and Goodyear had available manufacturing space at its huge Airship Dock, in Springfield Township, Ohio near Akron. Due to escalating problems in Europe and eventual war with Germany, Goodyear created Goodyear Aircraft Corporation to handle US military contracts in 1939. The German-US joint venture was dissolved in 1941, and Goodyear's military and commercial airship operations were transferred to the Goodyear Aircraft Corporation.

By 1941, manufacturing facilities were running at full capacity and ground was broken on July 15, 1941 at an additional location just west of Phoenix, Arizona. Goodyear was familiar with the area, and had been operating a large cotton ranch there for decades. Arizona produced more than three million pounds of airframes during World War II.

The Akron plant where FG-1s were built was handed over to the U.S. Navy, which used it as the basis of Naval Air Station Akron in January 1948.

Goodyear Aircraft Company employee Carl Wiley invented Synthetic Aperture Radar (SAR) in 1951. His invention resulted in the creation of the first SAR patent, first digital SAR processor, and development of several different high performance SAR systems used for applications such as surveillance, aerial warfare, and cartography.

=== Diversification ===
The Arizona plant produced a range of defense products in later years, including jet aircraft canopies, bulletproof glass and vehicular armor products, military shelters and missile transporters.

Darrell C. Romick, former Chief Engineer of Taylorcraft Airplane Company was a close associate of Wernher von Braun. Romick's worked for Goodyear Aircraft in the 1950s produced a rocket and spacecraft design called the Goodyear Meteor Junior concept. The 3-stage rocket had similarities to the much later Space Shuttle in that it was crewed, had reusable stages, and its topmost stage was designed to ferry personnel and cargo to a large space station orbiting the Earth. The concept was designed in 1954 to 1958, with a launch date of 1962.

The company became Goodyear Aerospace Corporation in 1963 to reflect the diverse range of products. In 1987 it was sold to Loral Corporation for $640 million following a massive restructuring of Goodyear prompted by the hostile takeover attempt by James Goldsmith and the Hanson Trust. The Goodyear name disappeared and became the defense systems unit of Loral.

=== Demise ===
The defense systems unit of Loral was acquired by Lockheed Martin in 1993, including intellectual property surrounding the now-retired Goodyear Blimp designs (GZ-20 and GZ-22). While owning the designs, Lockheed Martin does not manufacture airships.

== Aircraft ==
=== Airships ===
Model name	First flight	Number built	Type
C-class blimp	1918	10	Patrol airship
D-class blimp	1920	6	Patrol airship
E-class blimp		1	Training airship
F-class blimp	1919	1	Testbed airship
G-class blimp		10	Training airship
H-class blimp		2	Observation airship
J-class blimp	1922	3-4	Patrol airship
K-class blimp	1938	134	Patrol airship
K-1 (airship)		1	Experimental blimp
L-class blimp		22	Training airship
M-class blimp	1944	4	Patrol airship
N-class blimp		18	Patrol airship
Goodyear RS-1	1926	1	Military airship
Goodyear GZ-19	1959	3	Commercial airship
Goodyear GZ-20	1969	3-5	Commercial airship
Loral GZ-22	1989	1	Commercial airship
Goodyear ZWG	N/A	0	Unbuilt airborne early warning airship
Goodyear Type AD	1925		Sporting airship
Akron-class airship	1931	2	Patrol rigid airship

=== Fixed-wing aircraft ===
Model name	First flight	Number built	Type
Goodyear FG Corsair	1943	4,017	Single engine carrier based fighter
Goodyear Duck	1944	19	Single engine light flying boat
Goodyear F2G Corsair	1945	10	Single engine carried based fighter
Goodyear Inflatoplane	1956	12	Single engine inflatable aircraft

=== Helicopters ===
- Goodyear GA-400R Gizmo

=== Missiles ===
- UUM-44 Subroc

== See also ==
- Goodyear Massively Parallel Processor – supercomputer built by Goodyear Aerospace
- ASARS-1
