= Lakehurst Hangar No. 1 =

- Hangar No. 1, Lakehurst Naval Air Station
- U.S. National Register of Historic Places
- U.S. National Historic Landmark
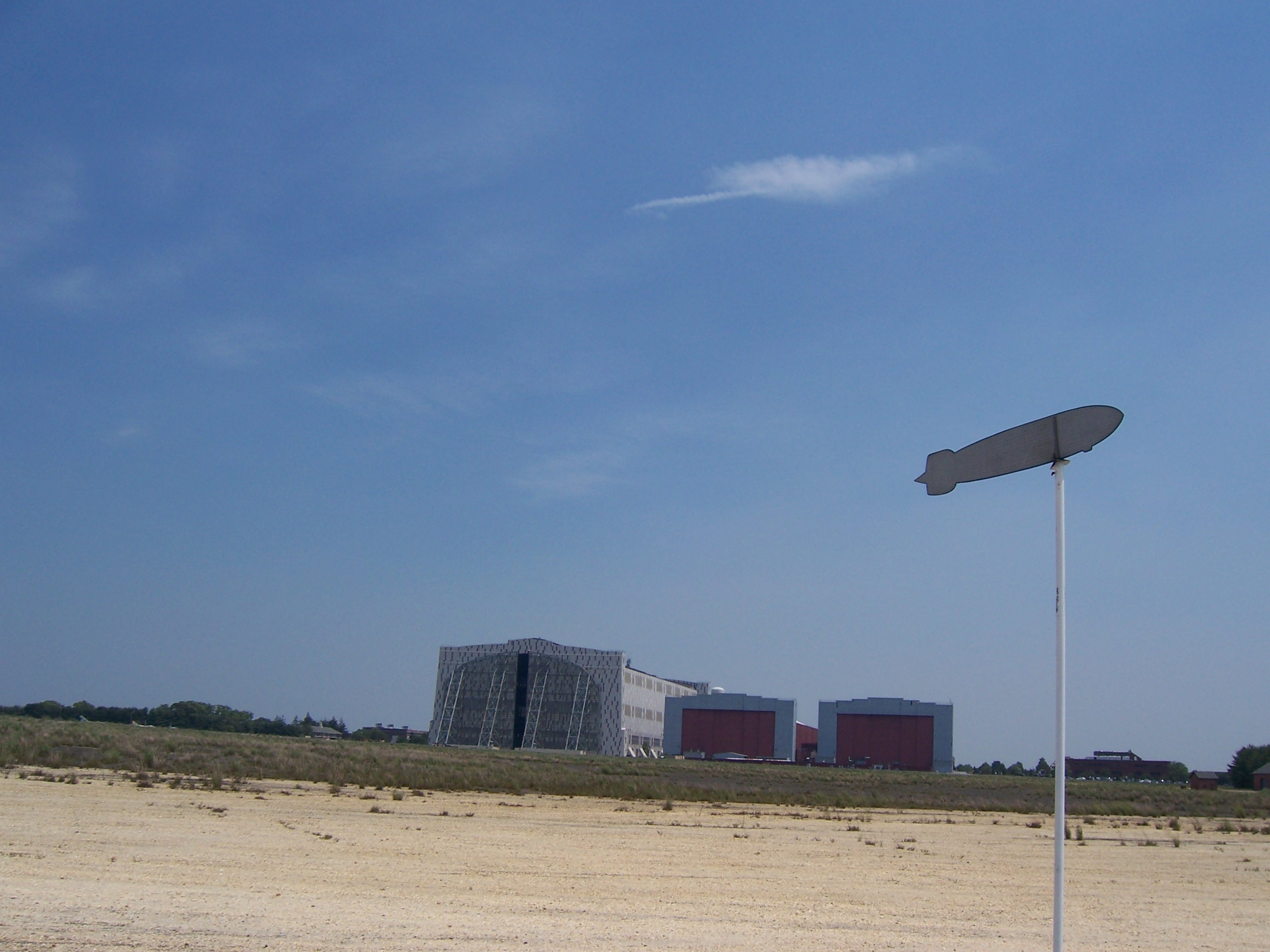
- The Hindenburg Disaster Marker

- Location within New Jersey Location within the United States
- Location: JB MDL Lakehurst, Manchester Township, New Jersey
- Coordinates: 40°1′44.44″N 74°18′59.79″W
- Area: 211,434 square feet (19,640 m^{2})
- Built: 1921
- NRHP reference No.: 68000031

Significant dates
- Added to NRHP: May 23, 1968
- Designated NHL: May 23, 1968

Hangar No. 1 is an airship hangar located at Naval Air Engineering Station Lakehurst in Manchester Township, in Ocean County, New Jersey, United States. It was the intended destination of the rigid airship LZ 129 Hindenburg prior to the Hindenburg disaster on May 6, 1937, when it burned while landing. Built in 1921, it is one of the oldest surviving structures associated with that period's development of lighter-than-air flight. It was designated a National Historic Landmark in 1968.

== Description ==
In 1921 the US Navy established Lakehurst Naval Air Station to serve as its headquarters for lighter-than-air flight. The new base became the center for experimentation and development of rigid airships for strategic (Note: During WWII, although airplanes performed most of the US Navy air operations, coastal anti-submarine patrol was conducted by lighter-than-air craft. The semirigid airships were used advantageously for coastwise and harbor-entrance observation because of their ability to slow down and hover for immediate scrutiny of suspected objects. Radio was used to warn shore stations and ships of danger. The airships carried depth bombs for attack and machine guns, primarily for defense.) and commercial purposes as well as the control station for all Naval lighter-than-air flights. Hangar No. 1 was the first major facility built at Lakehurst to house the huge helium-filled dirigibles.

The hangar was completed in 1921 by the Lord Construction Company, with trusses erected by the Bethlehem Steel Company. The hangar is 966 feet (294 m) long, 350 feet (110 m) wide and 224 feet (68 m) high, with a floor area of 211,434 square feet (1.964 ha). The hangar is typical of airship hangar designs of World War I, utilizing counterbalanced doors similar to hangars built in Great Britain. At each end are two pairs of massive steel doors mounted on railroad tracks. These double doors are structurally separate from the hangar itself. Each counterbalanced door weighs 1,350 tons and is powered by two 20-horsepower motors, although provisions were made to open the doors manually, which required the assembled manpower of nine men. Service mezzanines are located on each side of the hangar. The hangar also had a system of railroad tracks that led to the mooring areas outside the hangar. The hangar was large enough to house two rigid airships as well as additional non-rigid airships (blimps).

== Operations ==
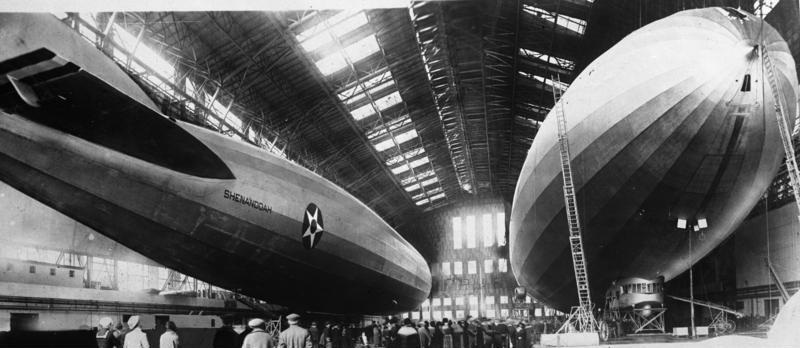
Shenandoah (left) and Los Angeles moored in Hangar No. 1 in 1924

The hangar was used to construct the USS Shenandoah (ZR-1) from 1922 to 1923. On September 4, 1923, the ship made a brief maiden flight in the vicinity of Lakehurst and was christened on October 10, 1923. In 1924, the US Navy obtained its second rigid airship, built in Germany and delivered to the United States as a war reparation payment. The USS Los Angeles (ZR-3) shared Hangar No. 1 with the USS Shenandoah. The hangar also provided service and storage for other airships, including the Graf Zeppelin (LZ 127), USS Macon (ZRS-5), and USS Akron (ZRS-4), as well as the German LZ 129 Hindenburg during its transatlantic flights.

Today the hangar holds a mock aircraft carrier flight deck, used as a training facility for aircraft carrier flight deck personnel.

The East Coast Indoor Modelers club, a chartered club within the auspices of the United States' official aeromodeling organization, the Academy of Model Aeronautics, has been allowed to use the hangar since 1926 to fly indoor free flight model aircraft. These self-powered aircraft models benefit from the large wind-free open space of the hangar.

Since 1994, Ocean County Vocational Technical School has operated its Career & Technical Institute in the hangar, the institute offers adult tech programs in aviation and electronic technologies.

In addition to Hangar No. 1, there are five other airship hangars at Lakehurst, which today are used for training, testing and storage.

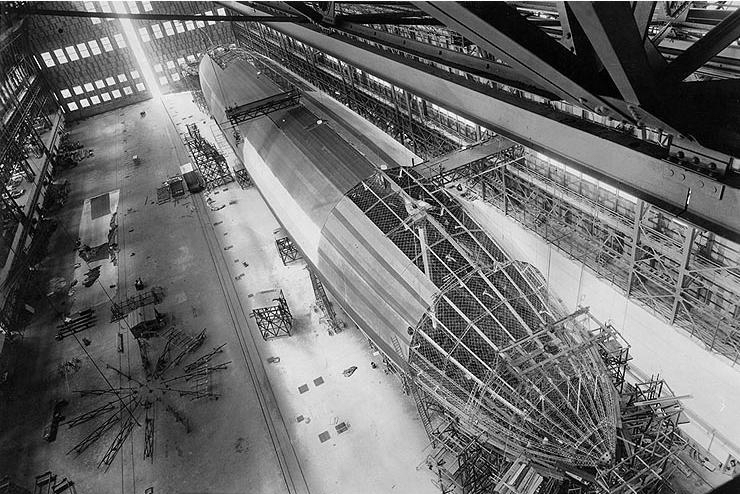
USS Shenandoah (ZR-1) under construction in Hangar No. 1 in 1923

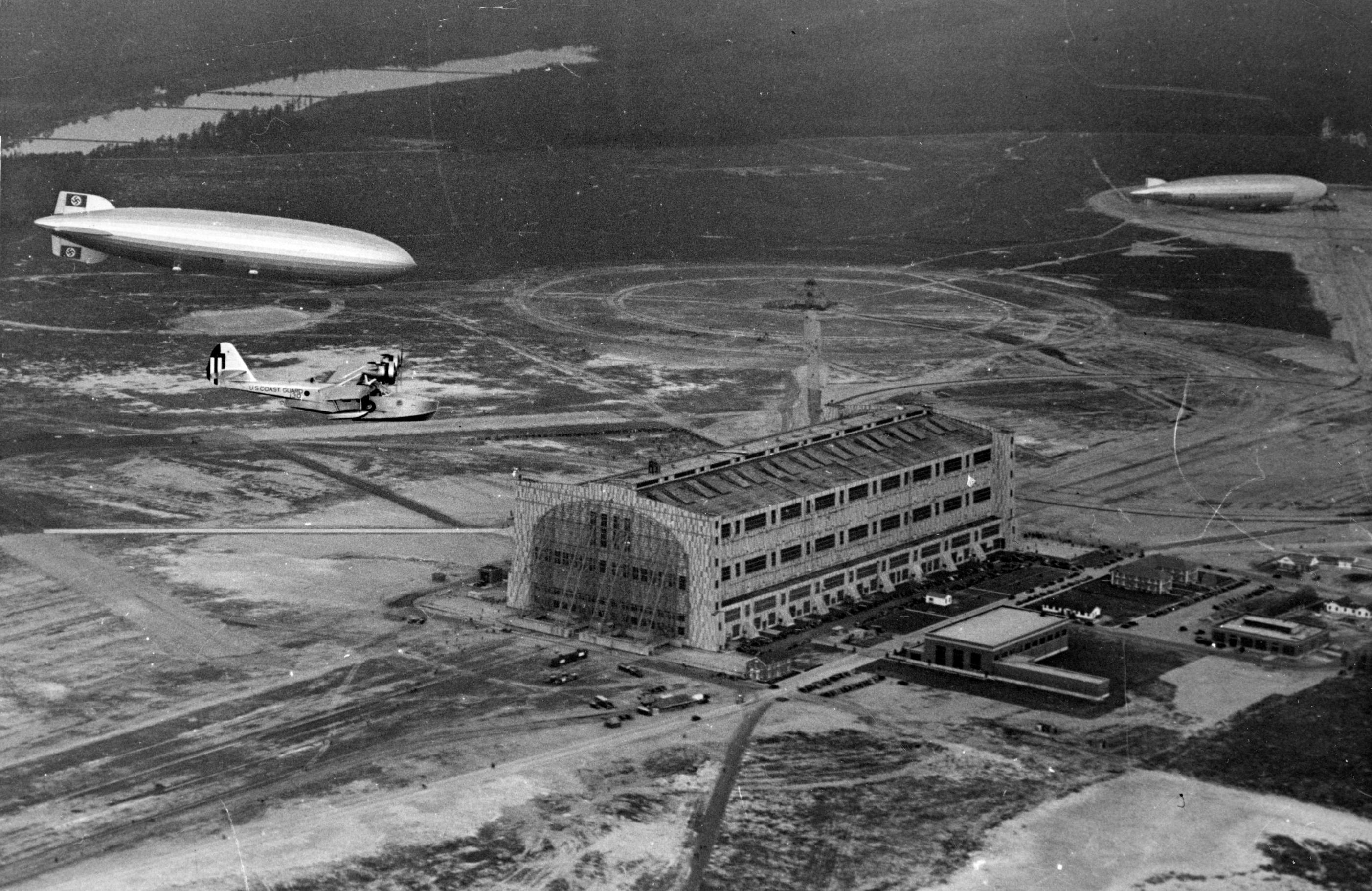
Arrival of Hindenburg at Lakehurst on May 9, 1936, with Hangar No. 1 in the center and USS Los Angeles (ZR-3) moored in the background

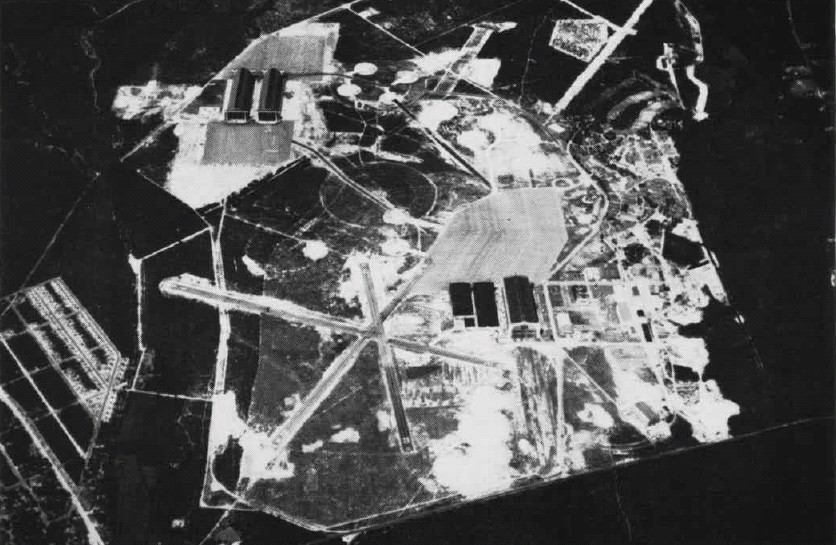
Hangar No. 1 on the Naval Air Station Lakehurst, about 1946/47

== See also ==
- Airship hangar
- Hangar One (Mountain View, California)
- Weeksville Dirigible Hangar
- Goodyear Airdock
- Bartolomeu de Gusmão Airport
- National Register of Historic Places listings in Ocean County, New Jersey
- JB MDL Lakehurst
- Joint Base McGuire-Dix-Lakehurst
- List of airships of the United States Navy
- US Army airships
