= Karl Arnstein =

Airship engineer

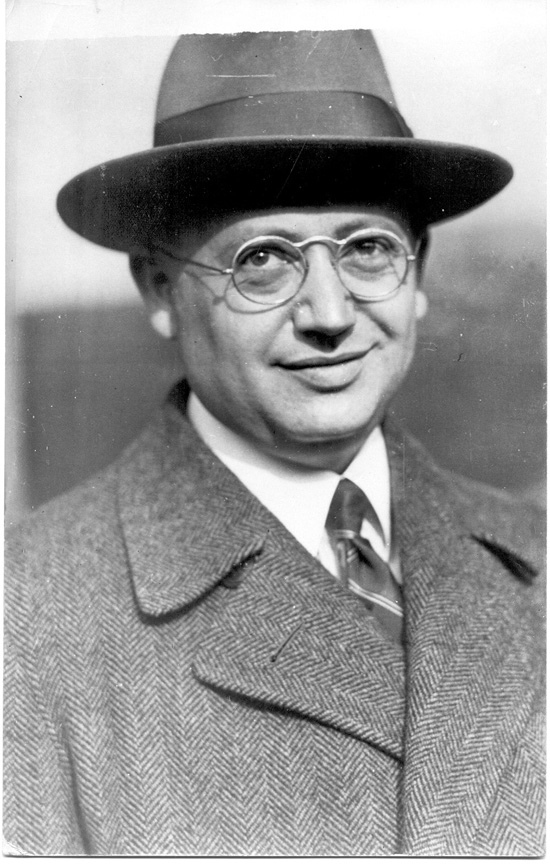

Karl Arnstein (March 24, 1887, Prague – December 12, 1974, Bryan, Ohio) was one of the most important 20th century airship engineers and designers in Germany and the United States of America. He was born in Prague, Bohemia (now the Czech Republic) to Jewish parents. He developed stress analysis methods that have been incorporated into bridges, airships and airplane materials. Before his involvement in airships he was one of the main engineers in building the Swiss Langwieser Viaduct.

In World War I Arnstein worked on improvements to the design of the German Zeppelin airships; see Zeppelin. He was the chief designer of the U.S. Navy airships, USS Akron and USS Macon, and was employed by the Goodyear-Zeppelin Corporation in Akron Ohio. He also designed Hangar One, one of the largest airship sheds in the US for sheltering huge Zeppelins.
