= N-class blimp =

American patrol airship

N class
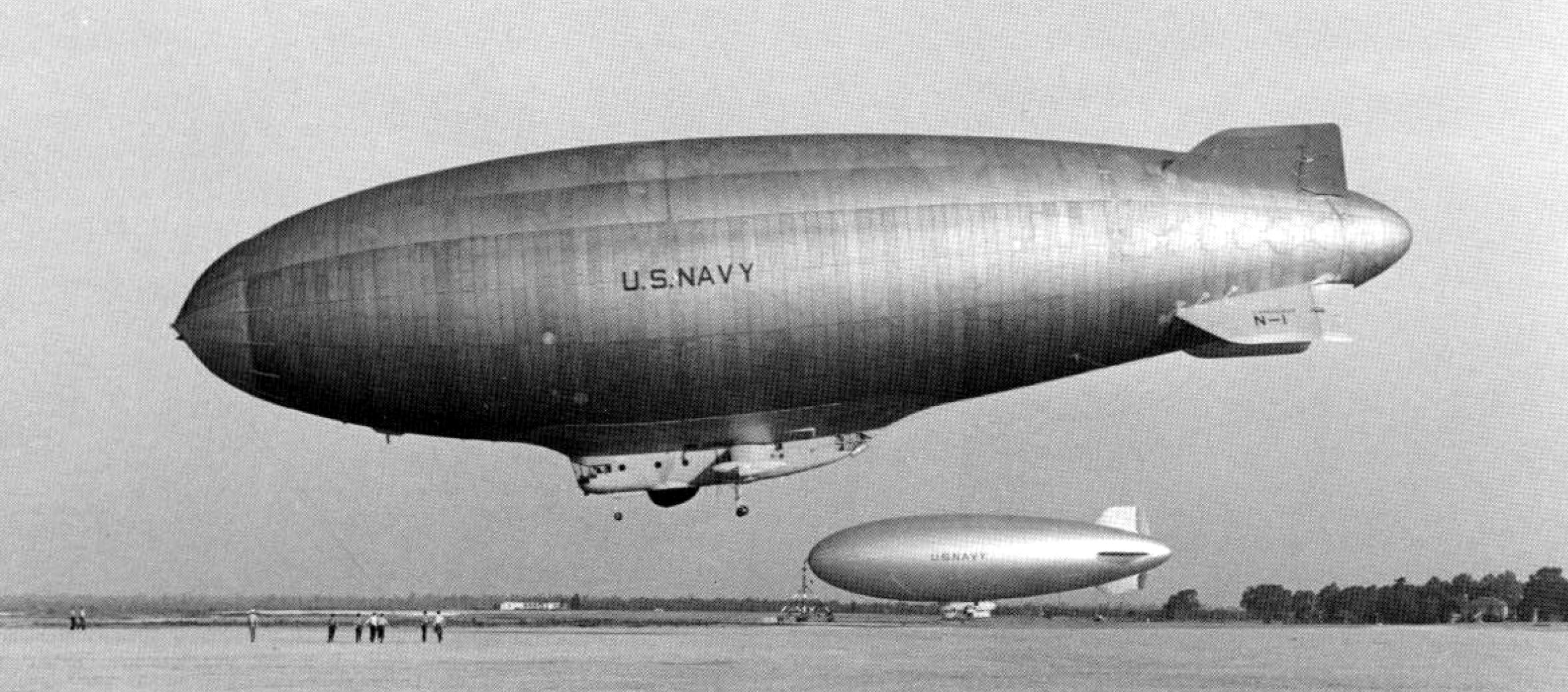

General information
- Type: Patrol airship
- Manufacturer: Goodyear Aircraft Corporation
- Status: Retired
- Primary user: US Navy
- Number built: 1, N-1 / 12, ZPG-2 / 5, ZPG-2W for 18 total ships in class.

History
- Manufactured: Delivered 16/6/1952 to 31/5/1957
- Retired: 1962

The N-Class, or as popularly known, the "Nan ship", was a line of non-rigid airships built by the Goodyear Aircraft Company of Akron, Ohio, for the US Navy. This line of airships was developed through many versions and assigned various designators as the airship designation system changed in the post–World War II era. These versions included airships configured for both anti-submarine warfare and airborne early warning (AEW) missions.

== Design and development ==
The initial version, designated ZPN-1, was a follow-on to the M-class blimp for patrol missions. The Nan ship used a significantly larger envelope than the M-ship, although their overall lengths were similar. Two Wright R-1300 Cyclone 7 single-row, air-cooled radial engines powered the N-Class blimps.

An initial contract was awarded to the Goodyear Aircraft Company for the prototype N-class blimp in the late 1940s, with delivery of the first on in 1952. The ZPN-1 designation was changed to ZPG-1 in 1954, and then to SZ-1A in 1962. The envelope capacity for the ZPN-1 was 875,000 cu ft (24,777 m^{3}) and used the gas helium for lift.

The ZPN-1 was followed by an order for four improved N-class blimps that were delivered in 1954. These airships were designated ZP2N, and re-designated in 1954 as the ZPG-2. Three of the ZP2N airships were modified for an airborne early warning mission in the mid-1950s and were designated, originally, ZP2N-1W but at delivery were designated ZPG-2W. Their designation was changed to EZ-1B in 1962. The envelope capacity of these airships exceeded 1×10^{6} cu ft (28,317 m^{3}). The ZPG-2W was equipped with the AN/APS-20 radar with its antenna installed beneath the gondola. An AN/APS-69 height-finding radar antenna was mounted on top of the envelope. The engines were installed in the control car and drove the propellers through extended shafts. The airship carried a crew of 21 to 25 and had an endurance capability of over 200 hours. The first ZPG-2W was delivered to the Navy at NAS Lakehurst in May 1955.

Operationally the ZPG-2W was used to fill radar gaps in the North American early-warning network between the Contiguous Barrier and the Inshore Barrier during the Cold War. In a demonstration of the ability to stay on-station autonomously for considerably extended periods, ZPG-2 "Snow Bird" (BuNo 141561), pilot in command Cdr. Jack R. Hunt USN, supported by a naval crew of 12 plus a civilian flight engineer from Goodyear, made a record-breaking non-stop flight across the Atlantic and back. The airship departed NAS South Weymouth, Massachusetts, on Monday 4 March 1957, reaching the south-west tip of Portugal by the evening of 7 March despite adverse headwinds for some of the way, passed by Casablanca, Morocco, on the morning of 8 March, then turned back westwards over the Cape Verde Islands towards the Caribbean Sea, eventually landing at NAS Key West, Florida, on the evening of 15 March. The flight had covered a distance of 9,448 mi (15,205 km) in 264.2 hours, and in doing so had not only broken the lighter-than-air distance record of 6,980 mi (11,233 km) set by the Graf Zeppelin rigid airship in 1929 but also the aircraft endurance record without refuelling.

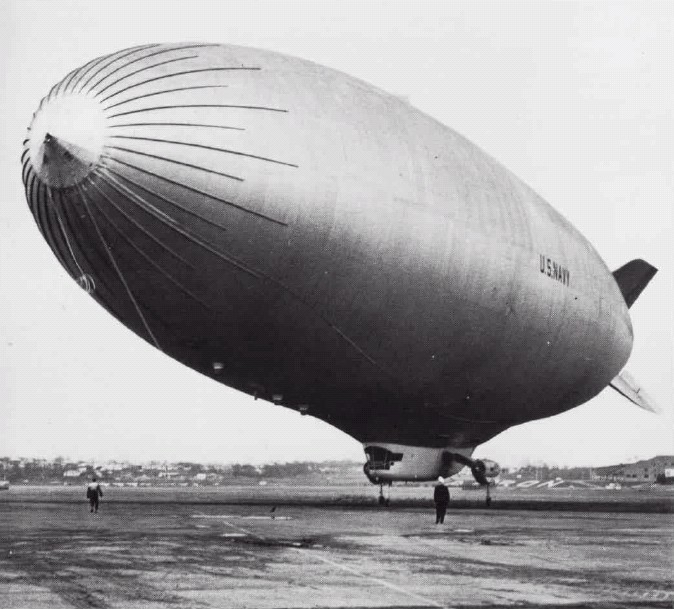
A ZPG-3W of Airship Airborne Early Warning Squadron ONE (ZW-1) in 1960.

One of the ZPG-2 airships was built or modified with external engines to test systems for the follow on ZPG-3W airships and is some times referred to as a ZPG-2 1/2.

The follow-on and larger AEW blimp was the ZPG-3W, the largest non-rigid airship built to ever enter military service. It was used to fill radar gaps in the North American early-warning network during the Cold War between the Contiguous Barrier and the Inshore Barrier. The popular name for the ZPG-3W was Vigilance. The ZPG-3W was unique in that the huge antenna for the early warning radar was enclosed inside the helium-filled envelope. Four airships were delivered to the U.S. Navy.

The first flight of the ZPG-3W was in July 1958. The envelope of the blimp was used as a radome for the 42 ft (12.8 m) radar antenna, thus providing the airship with a clean aerodynamic shape. The airship was 403 ft (122.8 m) long and was almost 120 ft (36.6 m) high, containing some 1,500,000 cubic feet (42,450 cubic meters). The endurance time of the airship could extend for days. This model of the N-class blimp was the largest non-rigid airship ever flown.

Newsreel of the maiden flight of the ZPG-3W.

The ZPG-3W Vigilance was the last of the airships built for the U.S. Navy. The July 6, 1960, crash of a Lakehurst-based airship east of Long Beach Island killed 18 sailors, a loss that added pressure on the program. The Navy subsequently decommissioned its airship units at NAS Glynco, Brunswick, Georgia, and at Lakehurst on October 31, 1961. On August 31, 1962, the last two ZPG-3W ships made a ceremonial last flight over Lakehurst — the base log noted, "This flight terminates operation of non-rigid airships at Lakehurst," Steingold said.

The specially designed and built AN/APS-70 Radar with its massive 42 ft (12.8 m) internal antenna was the best airborne radar system built for detecting other aircraft because its low frequency penetrated weather and showed only the more electronically visible returns. A large radome on top of the envelope held the height-finding radar.

In 1986, a ZPG-2W envelope was used for the construction of the Piasecki PA-97 Helistat. On 1 July 1986, the PA-97 crashed immediately after liftoff on a test flight, killing one of its pilots.

== Survivors ==
Two N-class blimp control cars are currently located at the National Museum of Naval Aviation at NAS Pensacola, Florida.

The cockpit from the control car for ZPG-2, BuNo 141561, also known as Snow Bird, has been restored and is on display at the museum. Launching from NAS South Weymouth, Massachusetts in March 1957, this airship made two crossings of the Atlantic before touching down at NAS Key West, Florida. All told, Snow Bird spent just over eleven days aloft in covering 9,448 miles without refueling. For his performance on the flight, the airship commander, Jack R. Hunt, received the Harmon International Trophy (e.g., Harmon Trophy) for Aeronautics.

Following its deflation in 1962, the control car of ZPG-3W number 2, BuNo 144243, was stored for many years at NAS Lakehurst. New Jersey. It is currently recorded as in storage at the National Museum of Naval Aviation at NAS Pensacola, Florida awaiting restoration. Following storage at NAS Lakehurst, It had reportedly been in storage at AMARC / 309th Aerospace Maintenance and Regeneration Group at Davis-Monthan AFB, Arizona from at least 1993 until being relocated to the National Naval Aviation Museum (NNAM), at NAS Pensacola in 1995. At some point post-1995, the control car of 144243 was returned to the 309 AMARG at Davis-Monthan AFB due to space limitations at NNAM. Although currently residing in unprotected storage, it still represents a far less humid environment and protects the control car from further deterioration until it can be returned to NNAM for eventual restoration and display.

Under the 1962 unified Department of Defense air vehicle designation system, the ZPG-3W was re-designated the EZ-1C in late 1962.

== Designation systems ==
Under the designation system established in April 1947, the first N-class airships were given the Navy designation of ZPN-1, (Z = lighter-than-air; P = patrol; N = type/class). In April 1954, the designation system was changed to mimic that used for heavier-than-air naval aircraft. With this change, the designation for the ZPN-1 became the ZPG-1 (Z = lighter-than-air; P = patrol; G=Goodyear (manufacturer); 1=first version). In the 1962 system, the ZPG-1 designation was changed to SZ-1A (S=anti-submarine warfare; Z=lighter-than-air type; 1=first vehicle in the type; A=first model in the series). The designations for later model blimps followed similarly.

== Specifications (ZPG-2W) ==
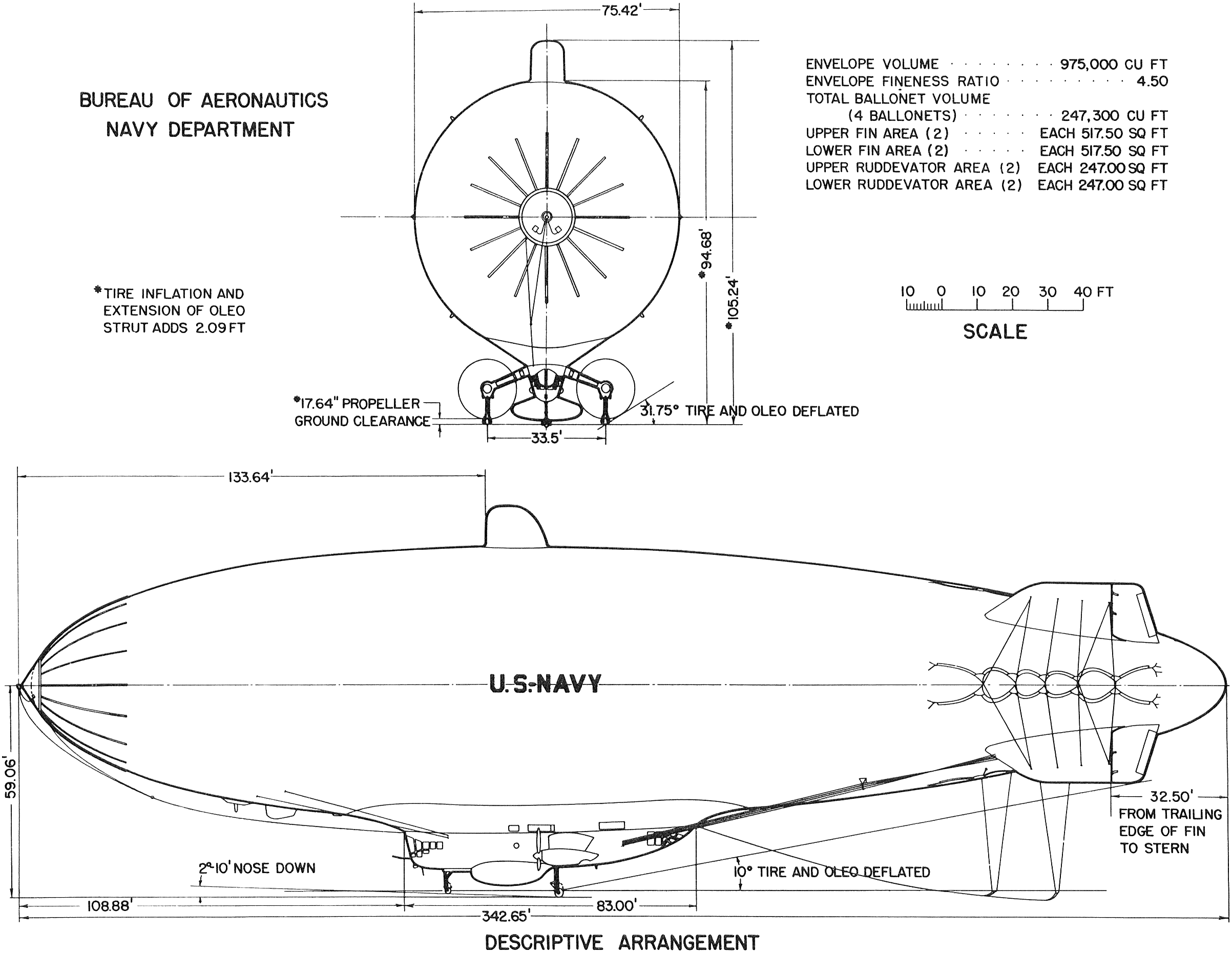
3-view line drawing of the Goodyear ZPG-2W

General characteristics

- Crew: 21
- Length: 343 ft 0 in (104.57 m)
- Diameter: 76 ft 0 in (23.17 m)
- Height: 107 ft 0 in (32.62 m)
- Volume: 1,011,000 cu ft (28,628.33 m^{3})
- Powerplant: 2 × Wright R-1300-4,-4A Cyclone 7 radials , 800 hp (600 kW) each

Performance

- Maximum speed: 80 mph (128 km/h, 70 kn)
- Endurance: over 200 hours

== See also ==
Aircraft of comparable role, configuration, and era

- Hybrid Air Vehicles HAV 304 Airlander 10 - largest-ever lifting-gas capacity non-rigid airship to fly (2016)

Related lists

- List of airships of the United States Navy
