= Sparrowhawk (disambiguation) =

Sparrowhawk is a name applied to several bird species.

Sparrowhawk or sparrow hawk may also refer to:

== Ships ==
- HMS Sparrowhawk, the name of several ships belonging to the Royal Navy of the United Kingdom
- Sparrowhawk, a mercantile barque, later coal lighter, formerly HMS Sparrowhawk (1856)
- Sparrow Hawk (pinnace), an English ship that wrecked on Cape Cod in New England in 1626, and is currently owned by the Pilgrim Hall Museum

== Aircraft ==
- AAI Sparrowhawk, a two-seat homebuilt gyroplane
- Curtiss F9C Sparrowhawk, a light biplane fighter aircraft, formerly carried by the United States Navy airships USS Akron and USS Macon
- Gloster Sparrowhawk British single-seat fighter aircraft
- Miles Sparrowhawk, British single-seat racing and touring monoplane
- Savoia-Marchetti S.M.79 Sparviero (Sparrowhawk in Italian), a three-engined Italian medium bomber
- Soko J-20 Kraguj (English: Soko J-20 Sparrowhawk), Yugoslavian light ground-attack and training aircraft
- Windward Performance SparrowHawk, a high-performance ultralight sailplane
- Sparrowhawk, the call sign given to civilian aircraft carrying members of the British royal family or which has 'royal flight' status

== Other uses ==
- Operation Epervier (English: Operation Sparrowhawk) (1986–present), codename for the French military presence in Chad
- Sparrowhawk Hill, Cayman Islands
- Sparrowhawk Media, British media company
- Sparrowhawk, a series of novels by Edward Cline
- Mount Sparrowhawk, Canadian Rockies
- The common name of Ged (Earthsea), main protagonist in the Earthsea novels by Ursula Le Guin
