= USS Akron =

U.S. Navy airship destroyed in 1933

Coordinates: 39°27′7.8″N 73°42′27.00″W

USS Akron (ZRS-4)
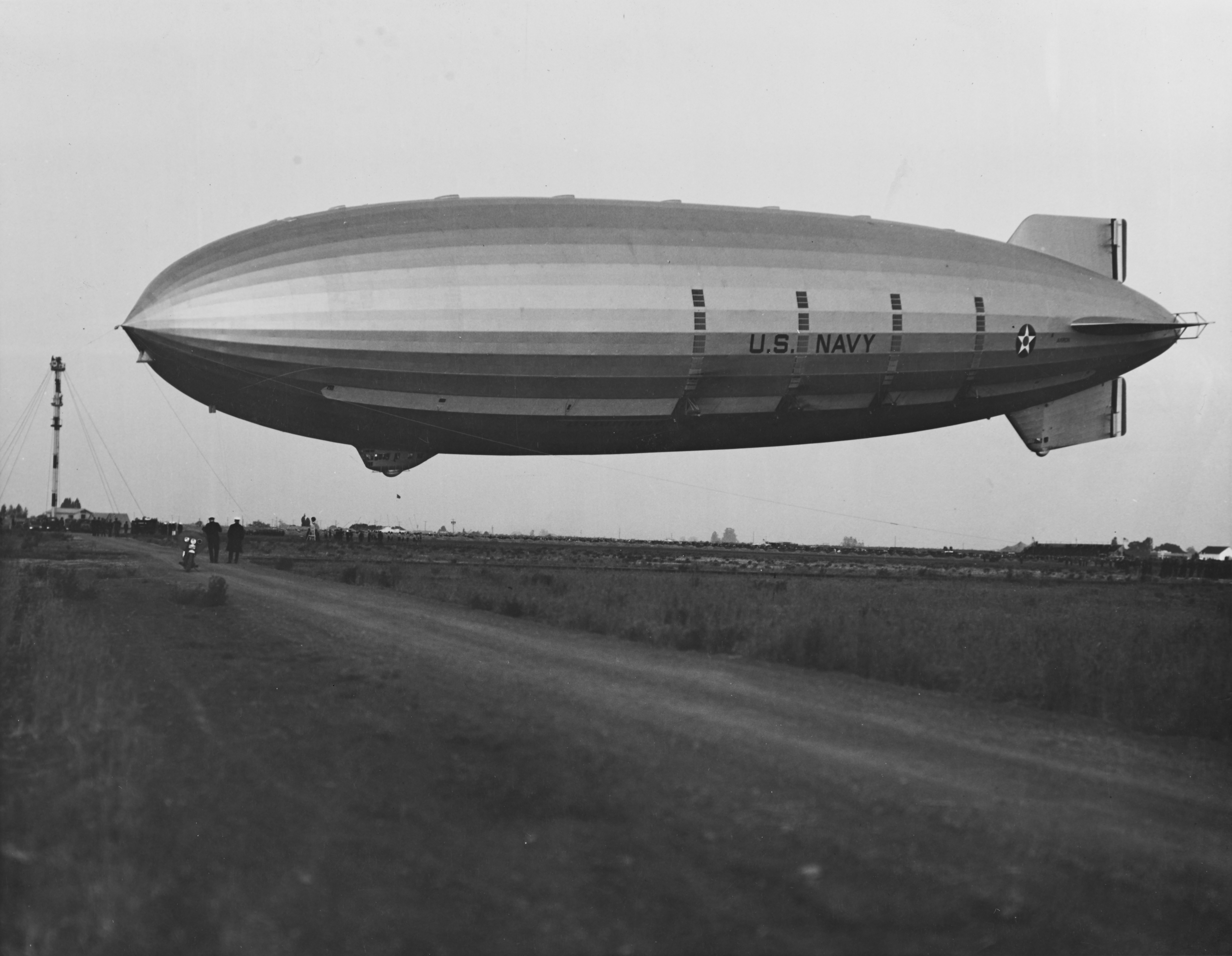
- Akron approaching the mooring mast at NAS Sunnyvale

General information
- Manufacturer: Goodyear-Zeppelin Corporation, Akron, Ohio
- Owners: United States Navy
- Serial: ZRS-4
- Aircraft carried: 5 × Curtiss F9C 'Sparrowhawk', Consolidated N2Y-1, Waco XJW-1
- Flights: 73
- Total hours: 1695.8

History
- Manufactured: 31 October 1929 (commenced); 8 August 1931 (launched)
- First flight: 23 September 1931
- In service: 27 October 1931 (commissioned)
- Last flight: 4 April 1933
- Fate: Crashed off coast of New Jersey, 4 April 1933

USS Akron (hull number ZRS-4) was a helium-filled rigid airship of the U.S. Navy, the lead ship of her class, which operated between September 1931 and April 1933. She was the world's first purpose-built flying aircraft carrier, carrying F9C Sparrowhawk fighter planes, which could be launched and recovered while in flight. With an overall length of 785 ft (239 m), Akron and her sister ship the USS Macon were among the largest flying objects ever built. Although LZ 129 Hindenburg and LZ 130 Graf Zeppelin II were some 18 ft (5.5 m) longer and slightly more voluminous, the two German airships were filled with hydrogen, so the two US Navy craft still hold the world record for the largest helium-filled airships.

The USS Akron was destroyed in a thunderstorm off the coast of New Jersey on the morning of 4 April 1933, killing 73 of the 76 crewmen and passengers. The accident involved the greatest loss of life in any airship crash, and was the deadliest aviation disaster of any kind prior to World War II.

== Technical description ==
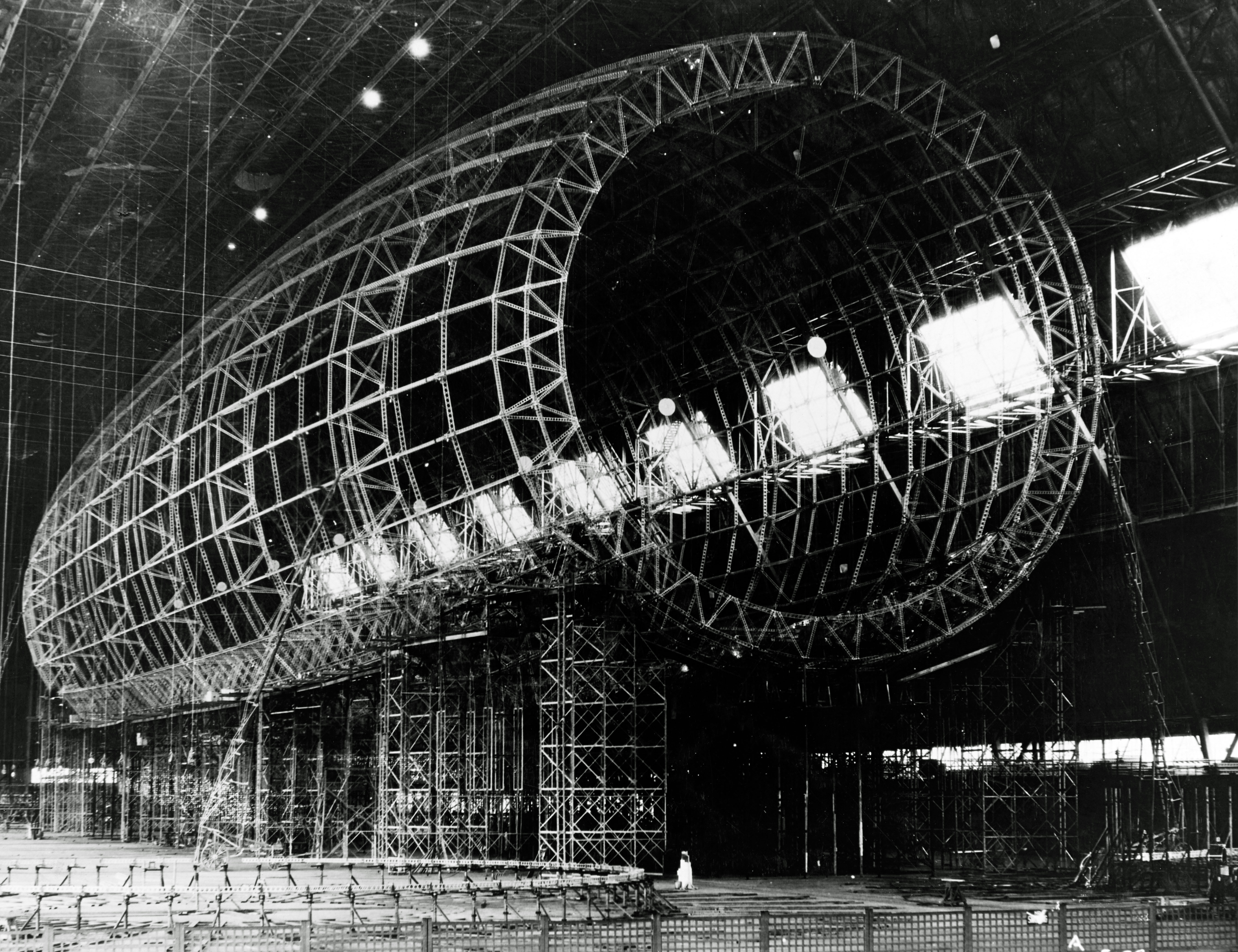
Akron under construction in the Goodyear Airdock at Akron, Ohio, in November 1930: Note the three-dimensional, deep rings.

The airship's skeleton was built of the new lightweight alloy duralumin 17-SRT. The frame introduced several novel features compared with traditional Zeppelin designs. Rather than being single-girder diamond trusses with radial wire bracing, the main rings of Akron were self-supporting deep frames: triangular Warren trusses "curled" around to form a ring. Though much heavier than conventional rings, the deep rings promised to be much stronger, a significant attraction to the navy after the in-flight breakup of the earlier conventional airships R38/ZR-2 and ZR-1 Shenandoah. The inherent strength of these frames allowed the chief designer, Karl Arnstein, to dispense with the internal cruciform structure used by Zeppelin to support the fins of their ships. Instead, the fins of Akron were cantilevered:, mounted entirely externally to the main structure. Graf Zeppelin, Graf Zeppelin II, and Hindenburg used a supplementary axial keel along the hull centerline. However, the Akron used three keels, one running along the top of the hull and one each side, 45° up from the lower centerline. Each keel provided a walkway running almost the entire length of the ship. The electric and telephone wiring, control cables, 110 fuel tanks, 44 water ballast bags, eight engine rooms, engines, transmissions, and water-recovery devices were placed along the lower keels. The inert gas helium was used instead of flammable hydrogen, which improved streamlining by allowing the engines to be safely placed inside the hull. A generator room, with two Westinghouse direct-current generators powered by a 30 hp internal combustion engine, was forward of the No. 7 engine room.

The main rings were spaced at 22.5 m (74 ft) and between each pair were three intermediate rings of lighter construction. In keeping with conventional practice, "station numbers" on the airship were measured in meters from zero at the rudder post, positive forward and negative aft. Thus, the tip of the tail was at station −23.75 and the nose mooring spindle was at station 210.75. Each ring frame formed a polygon with 36 corners, and these (and their associated longitudinal girders) were numbered from 1 (at the bottom center) to 18 (at the top center), port and starboard. Thus, a position on the hull could be referred to, for example, as "6 port at station 102.5" (the number-one engine room).

While Germany, France, and Britain used goldbeater's skin to gas-proof their gasbags, Akron used Goodyear Tire and Rubber's rubberized cotton, heavier but much cheaper and more durable. Half the gas cells used an experimental cotton-based fabric impregnated with a gelatin-latex compound. This was more expensive than the rubberized cotton, but lighter than goldbeater's skin. It was so successful that all the gasbags of Macon were made from it. The 12 gas cells were numbered 0 to XI, using Roman numerals and starting from the tail. While the "air" volume of the hull was 7,401,260 cu ft (209,580 m^{3}), the total volume of the gas cells at 100% fill was 6,850,000 cu ft (194,000 m^{3}). At a normal 95% fill with helium of standard purity, the 6,500,000 cu ft (180,000 m^{3}) of gas would yield a gross lift of 403,000 lb (183,000 kg). Given a structure deadweight of 242,356 lb (109,931 kg), this gives a useful lift of 160,644.0 lb (72,866.9 kg) available for fuel, lubricants, ballast, crew, supplies, and military load (including the skyhook airplanes)

Eight Maybach VL II 560 hp (420 kW) gasoline engines were mounted inside the hull. Each engine turned a two-bladed, 16 ft 4 in (4.98 m) diameter, fixed pitch, wooden propeller via a driveshaft and bevel gearing, which allowed the propeller to swivel from the vertical plane to the horizontal. With the engines' ability to reverse, this allowed thrust to be applied forward, aft, up, or down. From photographs, the four propellers on each side apparently were contrarotating, so it would appear that the designers were aware that running the propellers in the air disturbed by the one ahead was not ideal. While the external engine pods of other airships allowed the thrust lines to be staggered, placing all four engine rooms on each side of the ship along the lower keel resulted in Akron's propellers all being in line. This proved problematic in service, as it induced considerable vibration, which was especially noticeable in the emergency control position in the lower fin. By 1933, Akron had two of her propellers replaced by more advanced, ground-adjustable, three-bladed, metal propellers. These promised a performance increase and were adopted as standard for Macon.

The outer cover was of cotton cloth, treated with four coats of clear and two coats of aluminum-pigmented cellulose dope. The total area of the skin was 330,000 sq ft (31,000 m^{2}) and it weighed, after doping, 113,000 lb (51,000 kg).

The prominent, dark, vertical bands on the hull were condensers of the system designed to recover water from the engines' exhaust for buoyancy compensation. In-flight fuel consumption continuously reduces an airship's weight and changes in the temperature of the lifting gas can do the same. Normally, expensive helium has to be released to compensate, so any way of avoiding this is desirable. In theory, a water-recovery system such as this can produce a unit by weight of ballast water for every unit of fuel burned, though this is unlikely to be achieved in practice.

Akron could carry up to 20,700 US gal (78,000 L) of gasoline (126,000 lb (57,000 kg)) in 110 separate tanks, which were distributed along the lower keels to preserve the ship's trim, giving her a normal range of 5,940 nmi (6,840 mi; 11,000 km) at cruising speed. Theoretical maximum ballast water capacity was 223,000 lb (101,000 kg) in 44 bags, again distributed along her length, though normal ballast load at unmasting was 20,000 lb (9,100 kg). Maximum ballast was never an option, because a full fuel and ballast load would have left only 4,600 lb (2,100 kg) lifting capacity for aircraft, crew, and supplies, and each fully loaded F9C fighter alone weighed 2,800 lb (1,300 kg).

The heart of the ship, and her sole reason for existing, was the airplane hangar and trapeze system. Aft of the control car, in bay VII, between frames 125 and 141.25, was a compartment large enough to accommodate up to five F9C Sparrowhawk airplanes. Two structural girders, though, partially obstructed Akron's aftmost hangar bays, limiting its capacity to three airplanes (one in each forward corner of the hangar and one on the trapeze). A modification to remove this design flaw was pending at the time of the ship's loss.

The F9C was not the ideal choice, being designed as a "conventional" carrier-borne fighter. It was heavily built to withstand carrier landings, downward visibility was not very good, and it initially lacked an effective radio, but the primary role of Akron's airplanes was long-range naval scouting. What was actually needed was a stable, fast, lightweight scouting airplane with a long range, but none existed capable of fitting between the structural members and into the airship's hangar, as the F9C could.

The trapeze was lowered through the T-shaped door in the bottom of the ship and into the slipstream, with an airplane attached to the crossbar by the skyhook above its top wing, with its pilot on board and its engine running. The pilot tripped the hook, and the airplane fell away from the ship. On his return, he positioned himself beneath the trapeze and climbed up until he could fly his skyhook onto the crossbar, at which point it automatically latched shut. Now, with the engine idling, the trapeze and airplane were raised into the hangar, the pilot cutting his engine as he passed through the door. Once inside, the airplane was transferred from the trapeze to a trolley, running on an overhead monorail system by which it could be shunted into one of the four corners of the hangar to be refueled and rearmed. Having a single trapeze raised two problems; it limited the rate at which airplanes could be launched and recovered, and any fault in the trapeze would leave any airborne scouts with nowhere to land. The solution was a second, fixed trapeze permanently rigged further aft along the bottom of the ship at station 102.5 and known as the "perch". By 1933, a perch was fitted and in use. Three more perches were planned (at stations 57.5, 80.0, and 147.5), but these were never fitted.

Akron revived an idea used, and eventually rejected, by the German Navy Zeppelins during World War I, the Spähkorb or "spy basket". The "angel basket" or "subcloud observation car" allowed the airship to remain hidden in a cloud layer, while still observing the enemy below. The small car, rather like an airplane fuselage without wings, could be lowered on a 1000-foot-long cable. The observer on board communicated with the ship by telephone. In practice, the device was unstable, almost looping over the airship during its only test flight.

During the design stage, in 1929, the Navy requested an alteration to the fins. Seeing the bottom of the lower fin from the control car was considered desirable. Charles E. Rosendahl had witnessed, from the control room, Graf Zeppelin almost snagging her fin on high-tension power lines during her heavy take-off into an unsuspected but very marked temperature inversion from Mines Field, Los Angeles, at the start of the last leg of her round-the-world flight earlier that year. The design change would also allow direct vision between the main control car and the emergency control position in the lower fin. The control car was moved 8 ft (2.4 m) aft and all the fins were shortened and deepened. The leading-edge root of the fins no longer coincided with a main (deep) ring, and instead, the foremost attachment was now to an intermediate ring at frame 28.75. This achieved the required visibility, improved low-speed controllability, due to the increased span of the control surfaces, and simplified stress calculations, by reducing the number of fin attachment points. The designers and the Navy's inspectors, led by the very experienced Charles P. Burgess, were entirely satisfied with the revised stress calculations. However, this alteration has been the subject of much criticism as an "inherent defect" in the design, and is often alleged to have been a major factor in the loss of Akron's sister ship Macon. Construction for both ships amounted to $8,800,000 (in 1931 dollars, approximately $150,000,000 when adjusted for inflation in 2026) with the Akron accounting $5,538,400 of the total.

== Construction and commissioning ==
Construction of ZRS-4 was begun on 31 October 1929 at the Goodyear Airdock in Akron, Ohio, by the Goodyear-Zeppelin Corporation. Because it was larger than any airship previously built in the US, a special hangar was constructed. Chief Designer Karl Arnstein and a team of experienced German airship engineers instructed and supported design and construction of both U.S. Navy airships USS Akron and USS Macon.

On 7 November 1929, Rear Admiral William A. Moffett, the chief of the U.S. Navy's Bureau of Aeronautics, drove the "golden rivet" into the main ring of ZRS-4. Erection of the hull sections began in March 1930. Secretary of the Navy Charles Francis Adams chose the name Akron (for the city near where it was being built), and Assistant Secretary of the Navy Ernest Lee Jahncke announced it in May 1930.

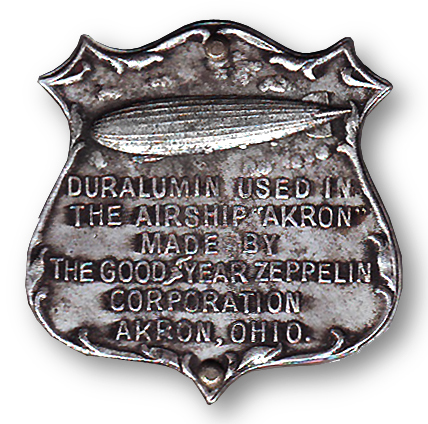
Sample of the duralumin from which the frame of USS Akron was built

On 8 August 1931, Akron was launched (floated free of the hangar floor) and christened by Lou Henry Hoover, the First Lady of the United States. The maiden flight of Akron took place around Cleveland on the afternoon of 23 September with Secretary of the Navy Adams and Rear Admiral Moffett on board. The airship made 10 trial flights, including a 2,000-mile (3,200 km) journey over a period of 48 hours to St. Louis, Chicago, and Milwaukee. On 21 October, Akron left the Goodyear Zeppelin Air Dock for the Lakehurst Naval Air Station (NAS), with Lieutenant Commander Charles E. Rosendahl in command, arriving the next day. On Navy Day, 27 October 1931, Akron was commissioned as a Navy vessel.

== History of service ==
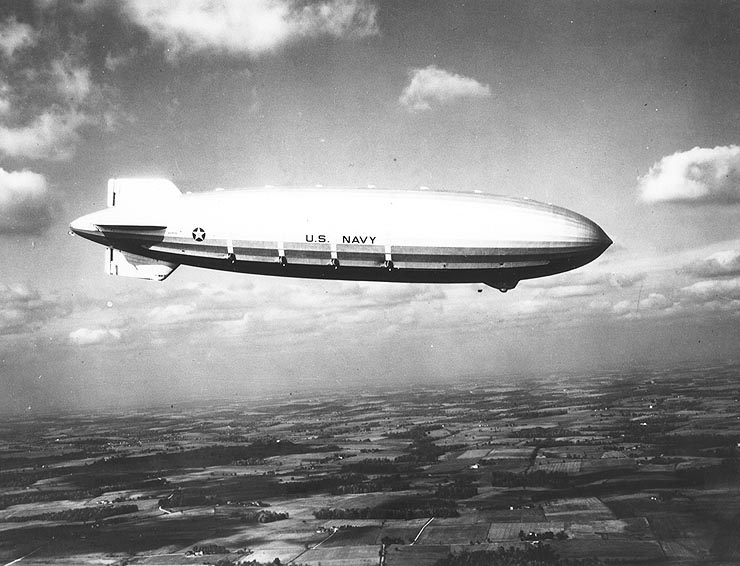
The maiden voyage of Akron on 2 November 1931, showing her four starboard propellers; The engines' water-reclaiming devices appear as white strips above each propeller. The emergency rear control cabin is visible in the lower fin.

=== Maiden voyage ===
On 2 November 1931, Akron departed on her first cruise down the eastern seaboard to Washington, DC. On 3 November, she took to the air with 207 persons on board. This demonstration was to prove that in an emergency, airships could provide limited but high-speed airlift of troops to outlying possessions. Over the weeks that followed, some 300 hours aloft were logged in a series of flights, including a 46-hour endurance flight to Mobile, Alabama, and back. The return leg of the trip was made via the valleys of the Mississippi and Ohio Rivers.

=== Participation in a search exercise (January 1932) ===
Film of Akron operating over Chesapeake Bay in early 1932, including footage of the ship mooring to the airship tender USS Patoka

On the morning of 9 January 1932, Akron departed from Lakehurst to work with the Scouting Fleet on a search exercise. Proceeding to the coast of North Carolina, Akron headed out over the Atlantic, where she was assigned to find a group of destroyers bound for Guantánamo Bay, Cuba. Once these were located, the airship was to shadow them and report their movements. Leaving the coast of North Carolina around 07:21 on 10 January, the airship proceeded south, but bad weather prevented sighting the destroyers (contact with them was missed at 12:40 EST, although their crews had sighted Akron) and eventually shaped a course toward the Bahamas by late afternoon. Heading northwesterly into the night, Akron then changed course shortly before midnight and proceeded to the southeast. Ultimately, at 09:08 on 11 January, the airship succeeded in spotting the light cruiser USS Raleigh and 12 destroyers, positively identifying them on the eastern horizon two minutes later. Sighting a second group of destroyers shortly thereafter, Akron was released from the evaluation about 10:00, having achieved a "qualified success" in the initial test with the Scouting Fleet, but the performance could have been better with radio detection-finding equipment, and scout planes.

As U.S. naval aviation historian Richard K. Smith wrote in his definitive study, The Airships Akron & Macon: Flying Aircraft Carriers of the United States Navy, with "consideration given to the weather, duration of flight, a track of more than 3,000 mi (4,800 km) flown, her material deficiencies, and the rudimentary character of aerial navigation at that date, the Akron's performance was remarkable. There was not a military airplane in the world in 1932 which could have given the same performance, operating from the same base."

=== First accident (February 1932) ===
Akron was to have taken part in Fleet Problem XIII, but an accident at Lakehurst on 22 February 1932 prevented her participation. While the airship was being taken from her hangar, the tail came loose from her moorings, was caught by the wind, and struck the ground. The heaviest damage was confined to the lower fin area, which required repair. Also, ground-handling fittings had been torn from the main frame, necessitating further repairs. Akron was not certified as airworthy again until later in the spring. Her next operation took place on 28 April, when she made a nine-hour flight with Rear Admiral Moffett and Secretary of the Navy Adams aboard.

As a result of this accident, a turntable with a walking beam on tracks powered by electric mine locomotives was developed to secure the tail and turn the ship even in high winds, so she could be pulled into the massive hangar at Lakehurst.

=== Testing of the "spy basket" ===
Soon after returning to Lakehurst to disembark her distinguished passengers, Akron took off again to conduct a test of the "spy basket"—something like a small airplane fuselage suspended beneath the airship that would enable an observer to serve as the ship's "eyes" below the clouds while the ship herself remained out of sight above them. The first time the basket was tried (with sandbags aboard instead of a man), it oscillated so violently that it put the whole ship in danger. The basket proved "frighteningly unstable", swooping from one side of the airship to the other before the startled gaze of Akron's officers and men, and reaching as high as the ship's equator. Though it was later improved by adding a ventral stabilizing fin, the spy basket was never used again.

=== Experimental use as a "flying aircraft carrier" ===
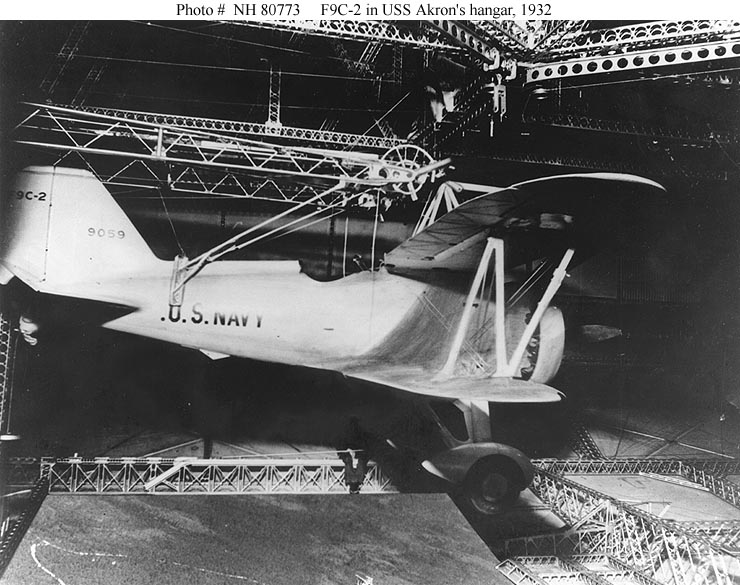
F9C Sparrowhawk in Akron's hangar: This aircraft was one of four lost with USS Macon on 12 February 1935.

Akron and Macon (which was still under construction) were regarded as potential "flying aircraft carriers", carrying parasite fighters for reconnaissance. On 3 May 1932, Akron cruised over the coast of New Jersey with Rear Admiral George C. Day, and the Board of Inspection and Survey, on board, and for the first time tested the "trapeze" installation for in-flight handling of aircraft. The aviators who carried out those historic "landings"—first with a Consolidated N2Y trainer and then with the prototype Curtiss XF9C-1 Sparrowhawk—were Lieutenant D. Ward Harrigan and Lieutenant Howard L. Young. The following day, Akron carried out another demonstration flight, this time with members of the House Committee on Naval Affairs on board; this time, Lieutenants Harrigan and Young gave the lawmakers a demonstration of Akron's aircraft hook-on ability.

=== "Coast-to-coast" flight and second accident (May 1932) ===
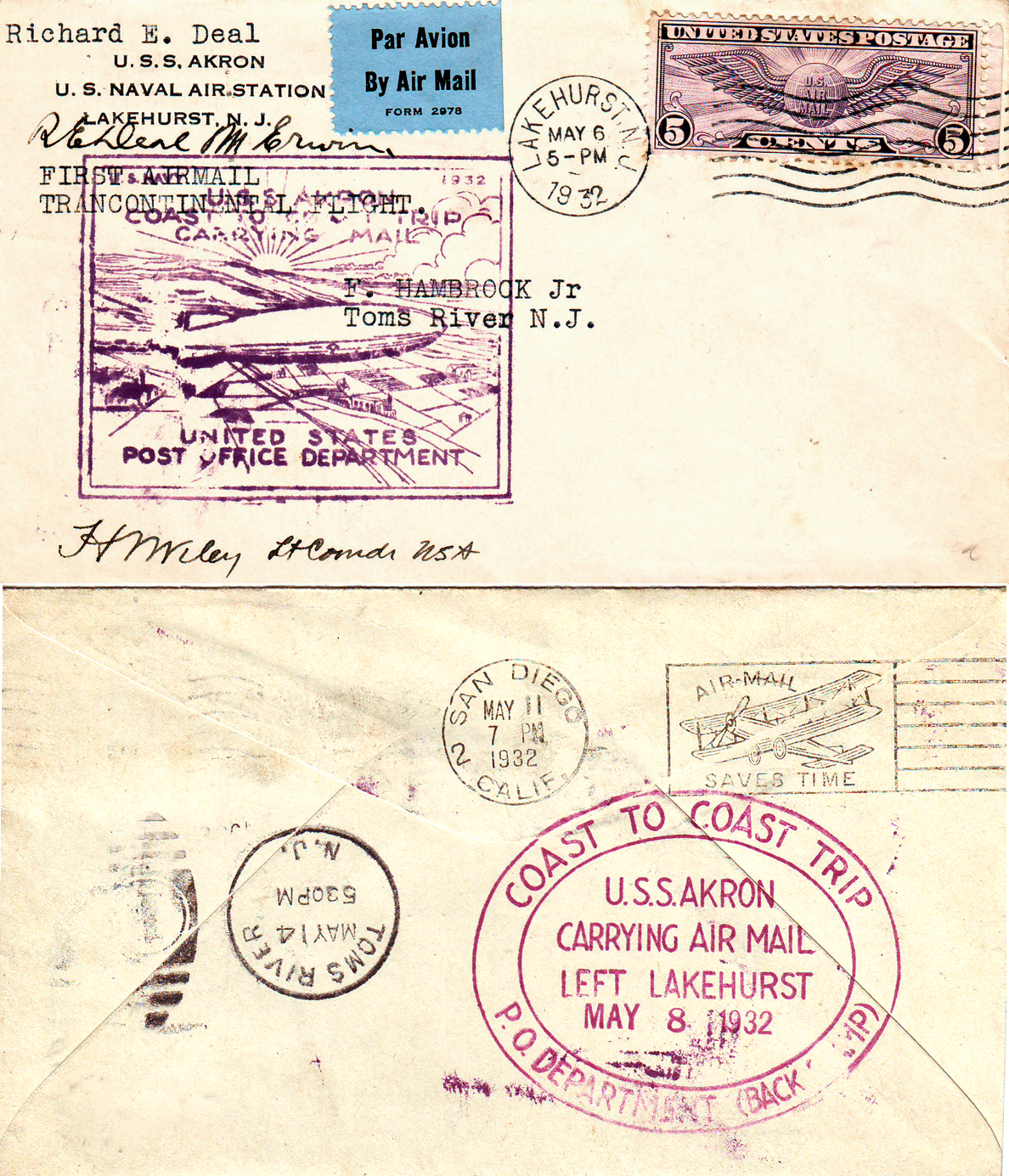
Cover carried on the May 1932 "Coast to Coast" flight and later autographed by the only three survivors of the April 1933 crash of USS Akron

Following the conclusion of those trial flights, Akron departed from Lakehurst, New Jersey, on 8 May 1932, for the American West Coast. The airship proceeded down the eastern seaboard to Georgia, and then across the southern Gulf Coast states, continuing over Texas and Arizona. En route to Sunnyvale, California, Akron reached Camp Kearny in San Diego on the morning of 11 May and attempted to moor. Since neither trained ground handlers nor specialized mooring equipment were present, the landing at Camp Kearny was fraught with danger. By the time the crew started the evaluation, the helium gas had been warmed by sunlight, increasing lift. Lightened by 40 short tons (36 t), the amount of fuel spent during the transcontinental trip, Akron was now uncontrollably light.

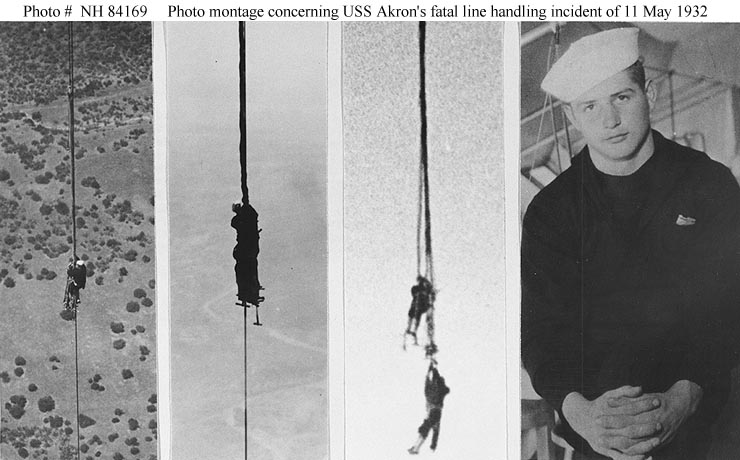
Still pictures from 11 May 1932 incident: The two pictures on the left and the picture at far right are of Seaman Cowart; the picture second from right shows Henton and Edsall before their fatal fall.

The mooring cable was cut to avert a catastrophic nose-stand by the errant airship, which floated upwards. Most of the mooring crew—predominantly "boot" seamen from the Naval Training Station San Diego—released their lines, although four did not. One let go at about 15 ft (4.6 m) and suffered a broken arm, while the three others were carried further aloft. Of these, Aviation Carpenter's Mate 3rd Class Robert H. Edsall and Apprentice Seaman Nigel M. Henton soon fell to their deaths while Apprentice Seaman C. M. "Bud" Cowart held on to his line and then secured himself to it before being hoisted on board the airship an hour later. Akron moored at Camp Kearny later that day before proceeding to Sunnyvale, California. Footage from the accident appears in the film Encounter with Disaster, released in 1979 and produced by Sun Classic Pictures.

=== West Coast flights ===
Over the weeks that followed, Akron "showed the flag" on the U.S. west coast, ranging as far north as the Canada–US border before returning south in time to exercise once more with the Scouting Fleet. Serving as part of the "Green Force", the Akron attempted to locate the "White Force". Although opposed by Vought O2U Corsair floatplanes from "enemy" warships, the airship located the opposing forces in just 22 hours, a fact not lost upon some of the participants in the exercise in subsequent critiques.

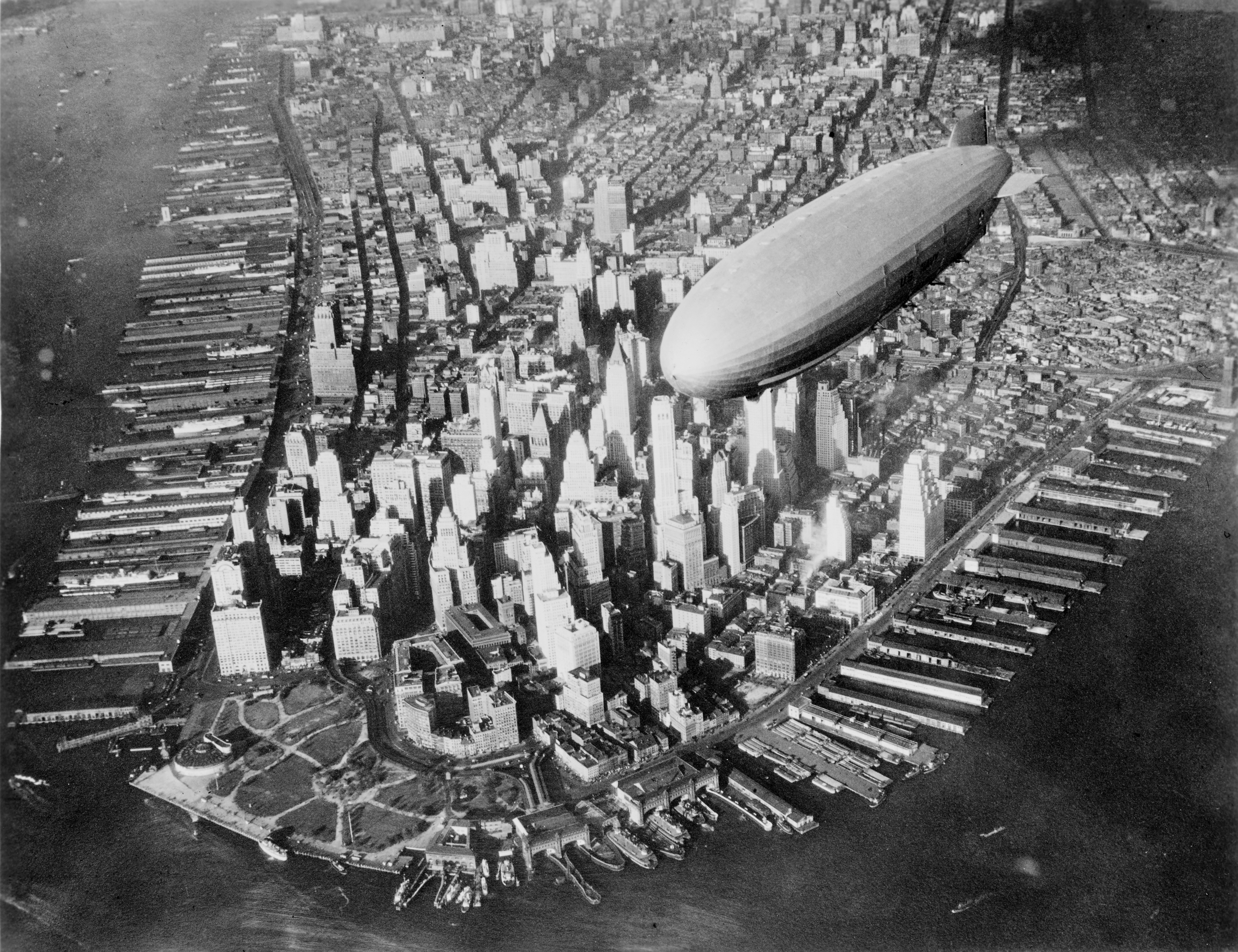
Akron over Lower Manhattan

In need of repairs, Akron departed from Sunnyvale on 11 June 1932 bound for Lakehurst, on a return trip that was sprinkled with difficulties, mostly because of unfavorable weather, and having to fly at pressure height while crossing the mountains. Akron arrived on 15 June after a "long and sometimes harrowing" aerial voyage.

Akron next underwent a period of voyage repairs before taking part in July in a search for Curlew, a yacht that had failed to reach port at the end of a race to the island of Bermuda. The yacht was later discovered safe off Nantucket. She then resumed operations capturing aircraft on the "trapeze" equipment. Admiral Moffett again boarded Akron on 20 July, but the next day left the airship in one of her N2Y-1s, which took him back to Lakehurst after a severe storm had delayed the airship's own return to base.

=== Further tests as "flying aircraft carrier" ===
Akron entered a new phase of her career that summer of 1932, engaging in intense experimentation with the revolutionary "trapeze" and a full complement of F9C-2s. A key element of the entrance into that new phase was a new commanding officer, Commander Alger Dresel.

=== Third accident (August 1932) ===
Another accident hampered training on 22 August, when Akron's tail fin became fouled by a beam in Lakehurst's massive Hangar No 1 after a premature order to commence towing the ship out of the mooring circle. Nevertheless, rapid repairs enabled eight more flights over the Atlantic during the last three months of 1932. These operations involved intensive work with the trapeze and the F9C-2s, as well as the drilling of lookouts and gun crews.

Among the tasks undertaken were the maintenance of two aircraft patrolling and scouting on Akron's flanks. During a seven-hour period on 18 November 1932, the airship and a trio of planes searched a sector 100 mi wide.

=== Return to the fleet ===
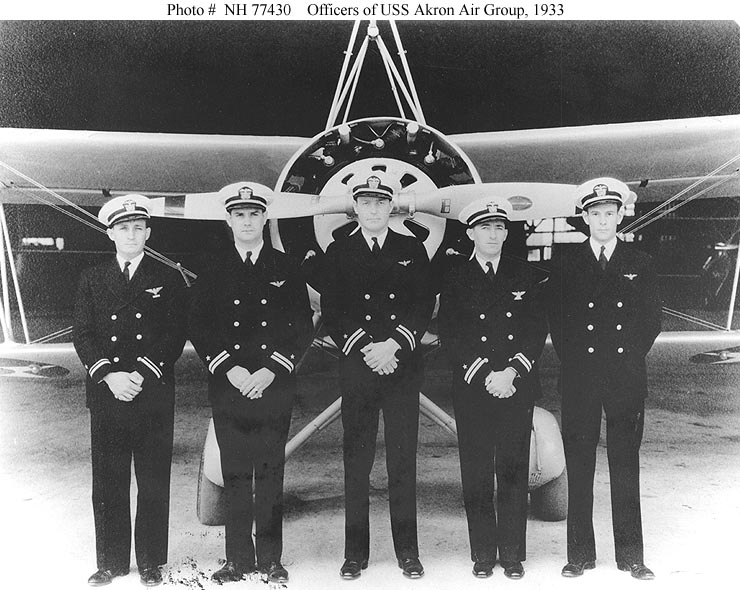
Pilot officers of USS Akron Air Group, 1933 (l to r): Lt(JG) Robert W. Lawson, Lt Harold B. Miller, Lt Frederick M. Trapnell, Lt Howard L. Young, Lt(JG) Frederick N. Kivette

After local operations out of Lakehurst for the remainder of 1932, Akron was ready to resume operations with the fleet. On the afternoon of 3 January 1933, Commander Frank C. McCord relieved Commander Dresel as commanding officer, the latter becoming the first commanding officer of Akron's sister ship Macon, whose construction was almost complete. Within hours, Akron headed south down the eastern seaboard toward Florida, where after refueling at the Naval Reserve Aviation Base, Opa-locka, Florida, near Miami, the next day proceeded to Guantánamo Bay for an inspection of base sites. At this time, the N2Y-1s were used to provide aerial "taxi" service to ferry members of the inspection party back and forth.

Soon thereafter, Akron returned to Lakehurst for local operations, which were interrupted by a two-week overhaul and poor weather. In March, she carried out intensive training with an aviation unit of F9C-2s, honing hook-on skills. During the course of these operations, an overfly of Washington, DC, was made 4 March 1933, the day Franklin D. Roosevelt first took the oath of office as President of the United States.

On 11 March, Akron departed Lakehurst bound for Panama, stopping briefly en route at Opa-locka before proceeding on to Balboa, where an inspection party looked over a potential air base site. While returning northward, the airship paused at Opa-locka again for local operations exercising gun crews, with the N2Y-1s serving as targets, before getting underway for Lakehurst on 22 March.

== Loss ==
Location of crash

On the evening of 3 April 1933, Akron cast off from the mooring mast to operate along the coast of New England, assisting in the calibration of radio direction finder stations. Rear Admiral Moffett was again on board, along with his aide, Commander Henry Barton Cecil, Commander Fred T. Berry, the commanding officer of NAS Lakehurst, and Lieutenant Colonel Alfred F. Masury, U.S. Army Reserve, a guest of the admiral, the vice president of Mack Trucks, and a strong proponent of the potential civilian uses of rigid airships.

After casting off at 19:28, Akron soon encountered fog and then severe weather, which did not improve when the airship passed over Barnegat Light, New Jersey, at 22:00. According to Richard K. Smith, "[u]nknown to the men on board the Akron, they were flying ahead of one of the most violent stormfronts to sweep the North Atlantic states in 10 years. It would soon envelop them." Enveloped in fog, increased lightning, and heavy rain, it became extremely turbulent at 00:15. Akron began a rapid nose-down descent, reaching 1,100 feet (340 m) while still falling. Ballast was dumped, which stabilized the ship at 700 feet (210 m), and climbed back to its 1,600 feet (490 m) cruising altitude. Then, a second violent descent sent the Akron downwards at 14 feet per second (4.3 m/s). "Landing stations" alerted the crew, as the ship descended tail-down. The lower fin struck the sea, water entered the fin, and the stern was dragged under. The engines pulled the ship into a nose-high attitude, then the Akron stalled, and crashed into the sea.

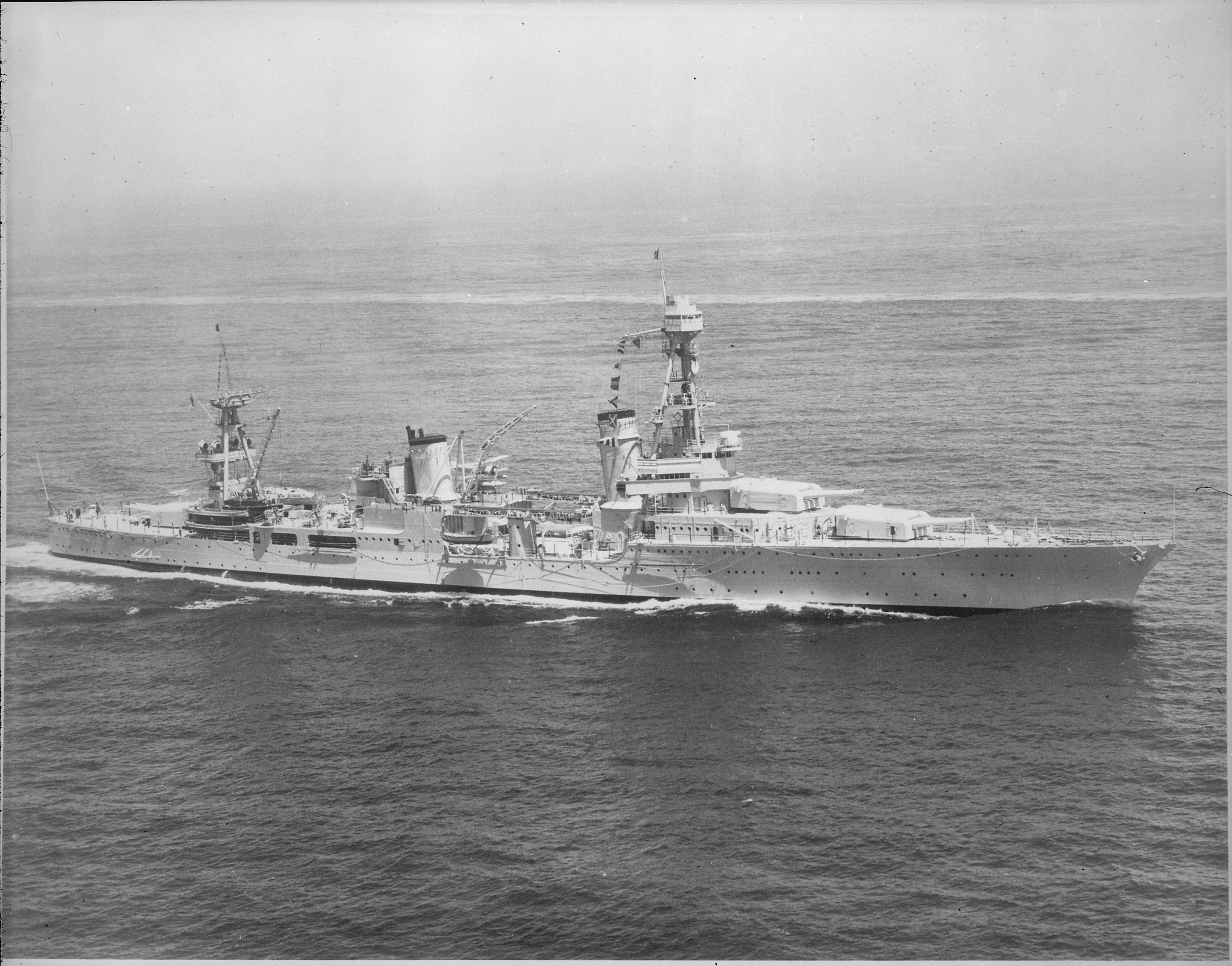
The cruiser USS Portland was one of several ships that searched for survivors from the Akron.

Akron broke up rapidly and sank in the stormy Atlantic. The crew of the nearby German merchant ship Phoebus saw lights descending toward the ocean around 00:23 and altered course to starboard to investigate, with her captain believing that he was witnessing an airplane crash. At 00:55, executive officer Lieutenant Commander Herbert V. Wiley was pulled from the water while the ship's boat picked up three more men: Chief Radioman Robert W. Copeland, Boatswain's Mate Second Class Richard E. Deal, and Aviation Metalsmith Second Class Moody E. Erwin. Despite artificial respiration, Copeland never regained consciousness, and he died aboard Phoebus. Although the German sailors spotted four or five other men in the water, they did not know their ship had chanced upon the crash of Akron until Lt. Commander Wiley regained consciousness half an hour after being rescued. The crew of Phoebus combed the ocean in boats for over five hours in a fruitless search for more survivors. The Navy blimp J-3—sent out to join the search—also crashed, with the loss of two men.

The U.S. Coast Guard cutter Tucker—the first American vessel on the scene—arrived at 06:00, taking the airship's survivors and the body of Copeland on board. Among the other ships combing the area for survivors were the heavy cruiser Portland, the destroyer Cole, the Coast Guard cutter Mojave, and the Coast Guard destroyers McDougal and Hunt, as well as two Coast Guard aircraft. The fishing vessel Grace F from Gloucester, Massachusetts also assisted in the search, using her seining gear in an effort to recover bodies. Most casualties had been caused by drowning and hypothermia, since the crew had not been issued life jackets, and time had not been available to deploy the single life raft. The accident left 73 dead, and only three survivors. Wiley, standing next to the two other survivors, Moody E. Erwin (AM2c | Aviation Metalsmith 2d), and Richard E. Deal (CBM | Chief Boatswain’s Mate), gave a brief account on 6 April.

== Aftermath of loss ==
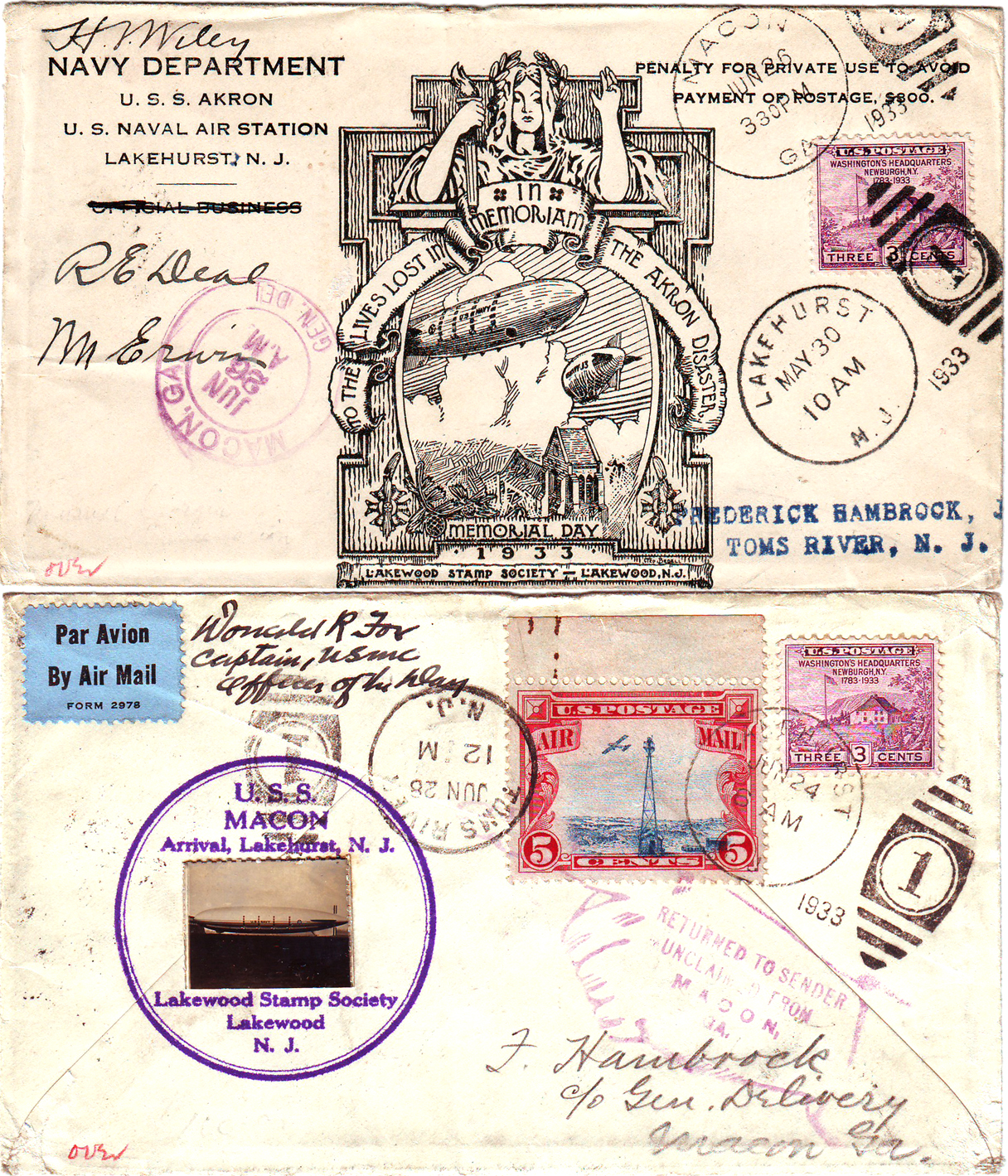
Franked USS Akron penalty cover with 1933 Memorial Day cachet autographed by its only three survivors, and postmarked at Lakehurst on 24 June 1933, the day Macon first arrived there

Akron's loss spelled the beginning of the end for the rigid airship in the U.S. Navy, especially since one of her leading proponents, Rear Admiral William A. Moffett, was among the dead. President Roosevelt said, "The loss of the Akron with her crew of gallant officers and men is a national disaster. I grieve with the Nation and especially with the wives and families of the men who were lost. Ships can be replaced, but the Nation can ill afford to lose such men as Rear Admiral William A. Moffett and his shipmates who died with him upholding to the end the finest traditions of the United States Navy." The loss of the Akron was the largest loss of life in any airship crash.

Macon and other airships received life jackets to avert a repetition of this tragedy. When Macon was damaged in a storm in 1935 and subsequently sank after landing in the sea, 70 of the 72 crew were saved.

Songwriter Bob Miller wrote and recorded a song, "The Crash of the Akron", within one day of the disaster.

In 2003, the U.S. submarine NR-1 surveyed the wreck site and performed sonar imaging of the Akron's girders.

== Assessment ==
For numerous reasons, in the opinion of Richard K. Smith, Akron never got the chance to show what she was capable of. Initially, the idea had been to use her as a scout for the fleet, just as the German Navy Zeppelins had been used during World War I with her airplanes being simply useful auxiliaries capable of extending her range of vision or of defending her against attacking enemy aircraft. Gradually, in the minds of the more forward-thinking officers familiar with airship and scouting fleet operations, that was reversed, Macon and Akron came to be regarded as aircraft carriers, whose sole job was to get the scouting airplanes to the search area and then to support them in their flights. The mothership herself should stay in the background, out of sight of enemy surface units, and act merely as a mobile advanced base for the airplanes, which should do all of the actual searching. Any aircraft carrier could do that, but only an airship could do it so quickly, since her speed was at least twice that of a surface ship, enabling her to get to the scene or be switched from flank to flank quickly. However, she was an experimental ship, a prototype, and time was needed for the doctrine and suitable tactics to evolve, as well as for developing the techniques of navigating, controlling, and coordinating the scouts. At first, developments were hampered by inadequate radio equipment, and the difficulties encountered by the scout pilots in navigating, scouting, and communicating from their cramped, open cockpits.

Some politicians, some senior officers, and some sections of the press seemed predisposed to judge the airship experiment a failure without regard to the evidence. Even within the Navy's Bureau of Aeronautics, many opposed spending so much on a single asset. Smith also asserts that political pressure inside and outside the Navy led to the ship being pushed too early to attempt too much. Little allowance seems to have been made for the fact that this was a prototype, an experimental system, and that tactics for her use were being developed "on the hoof". As a result, the airship's performance in fleet exercises was not all that some had hoped, and gave an exaggerated impression of the ship's vulnerability and failed to demonstrate her strengths.

== Specifications (as built) ==
These data are based on the book The Story of the Airship by Hugh Allen:

General characteristics

- Crew: 60
- Length: 785 ft (239 m)
- Diameter: 132 ft 11 in (40 m)
- Height: 146.5 ft (44.7 m)
- Volume: 6,500,000 cu ft (180,000 m^{3})
- Gross weight: 403,000 lb (182,798 kg)
- Useful lift: 182,000 lb (83,000 kg)
- Powerplant: 8 × Maybach VL II 60 deg. V12 water-cooled engines, 560 hp (420 kW) each
- Propellers: 2-bladed fixed-pitch, rotatable wooden propellers

Performance

- Maximum speed: 73 kn (84 mph, 135 km/h)
- Cruise speed: 43 kn (50 mph, 80 km/h)
- Range: 9,190 nmi (10,580 mi, 17,030 km) at 50 miles per hour (80 km/h)

Armament

- Guns: 8x .30-caliber M1919 Browning machine guns

== See also ==
- List of airship accidents
- List of airships of the United States Navy
- Rigid airship
