= USS Macon (ZRS-5) =

United States historic airship

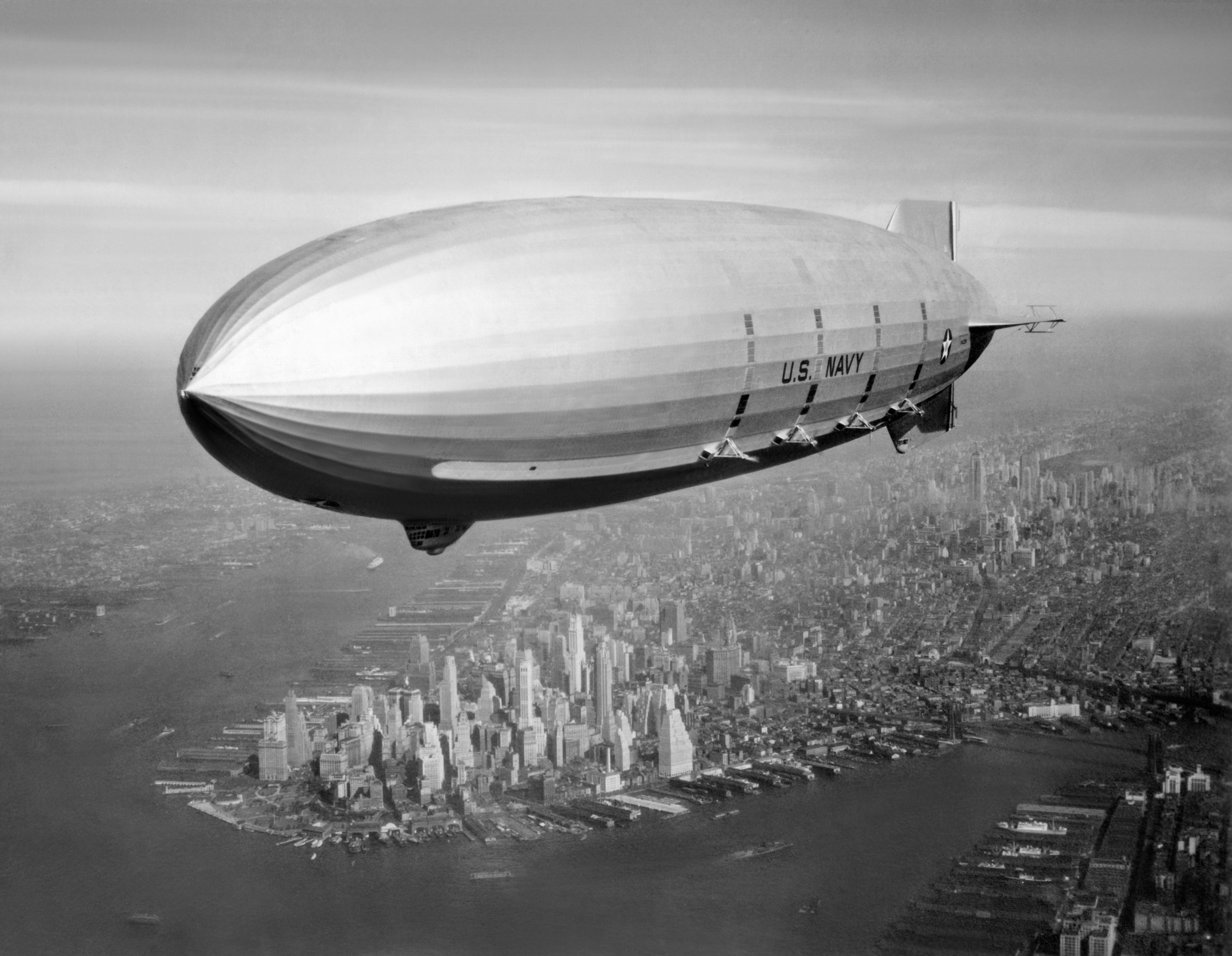
- USS Macon over New York City in 1933

General information
- Manufacturer: Goodyear–Zeppelin Corporation (Springfield Township, Ohio)
- Owners: United States Navy
- Serial: ZRS-5
- Aircraft carried: 5 × Curtiss F9C Sparrowhawk, Fleet N2Y-1; Waco XJW-1

History
- Manufactured: 31 October 1929 (commenced); 8 August 1931 (launched)
- First flight: 21 April 1933
- In service: 23 June 1933 (commissioned)
- Last flight: 12 February 1935
- Fate: Crashed off the coast of California, 12 February 1935

USS Macon (ZRS-5) was a rigid airship built and operated by the United States Navy for scouting and served as a "flying aircraft carrier", carrying up to five single-seat Curtiss F9C Sparrowhawk parasite biplanes for scouting or two-seat Fleet N2Y-1s for training. In service for less than two years, the Macon was damaged in a storm and lost off California's Big Sur coast in February 1935, though most of the crew were rescued. The wreckage is listed as the USS Macon Airship Remains on the U.S. National Register of Historic Places.

Macon and her sister ship USS Akron were among the longest and most voluminous flying objects in the world. Although the hydrogen-filled, Zeppelin-built Hindenburg and LZ 130 Graf Zeppelin II were some 20 ft (6.1 m) longer, the two American-built naval airships still hold the world record for the largest helium-filled rigid airships.

== Construction ==
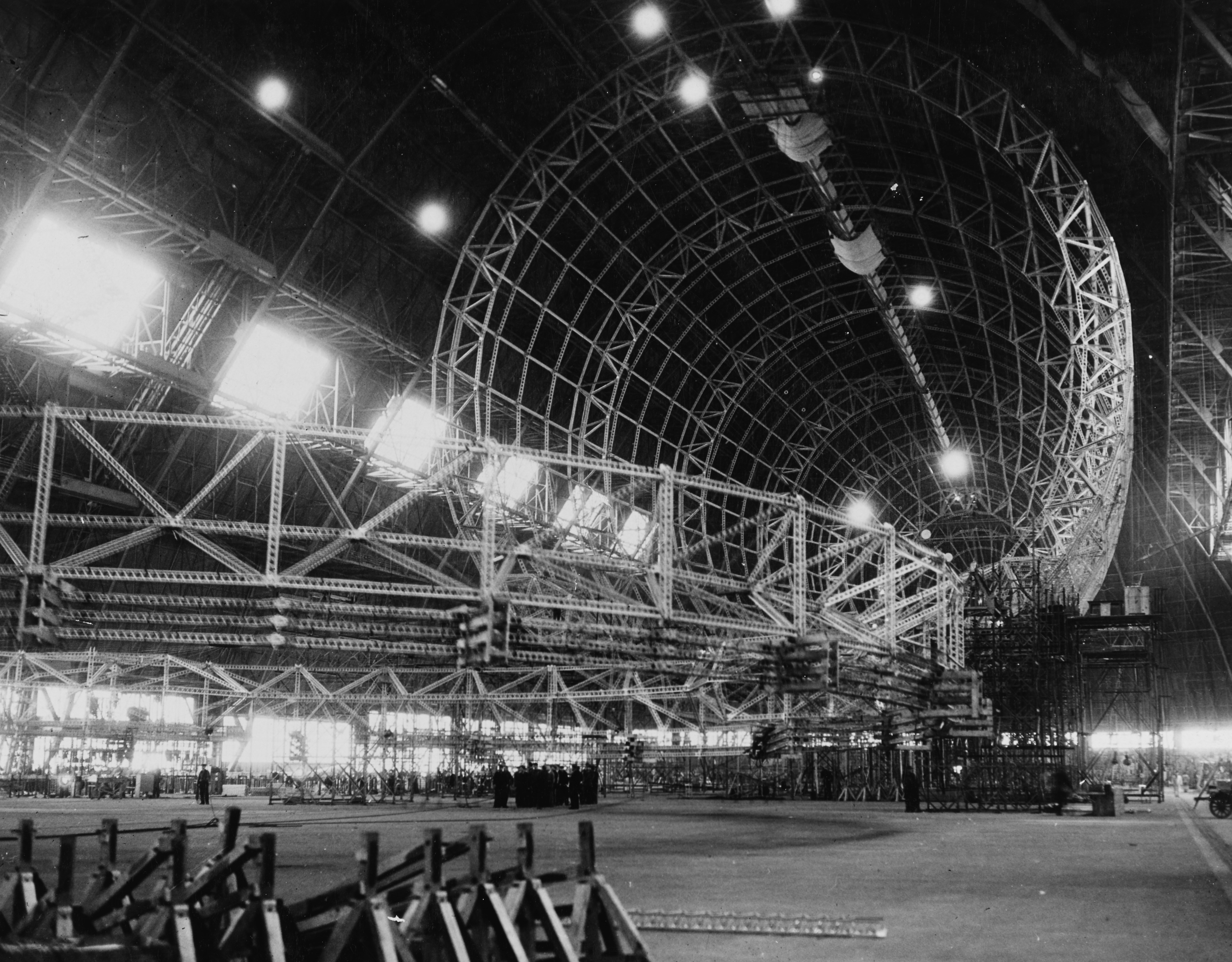
Macon under construction at the Goodyear Airdock

USS Macon was built at the Goodyear Airdock in Springfield Township, Ohio, by the Goodyear–Zeppelin Corporation at a cost of $2.45 million (equivalent to $58 million in 2025) under a fixed-price contract. Because this was by far the biggest airship ever to be built in America, a team of experienced German airship engineers—led by Chief Designer Karl Arnstein—instructed and supported design and construction of both the U.S. Navy airships Akron and Macon.

Macon had a structured duraluminum hull with three interior keels. The airship was kept aloft by 12 helium-filled gas cells made from gelatin-latex fabric. Inside the hull, the ship had eight German-made Maybach VL II 12-cylinder, 560 hp (418 kW) gasoline-powered engines that drove outside propellers. The propellers could be rotated down or backwards, providing an early form of thrust vectoring to control the ship during takeoff and landings. The rows of slots in the hull above each engine were part of a system to condense out the water vapor from the engine exhaust gases for use as buoyancy compensation ballast to compensate for the loss of weight as fuel was consumed.

== Service history ==
=== Christening and commissioning ===
Macon was christened on 11 March 1933 by Jeanette Whitton Moffett, wife of Rear Admiral William A. Moffett, Chief of the U.S. Navy's Bureau of Aeronautics. The airship was named after the city of Macon, Georgia, which was the largest city in the Congressional district of Carl Vinson, then the chairman of the U.S. House of Representatives' Committee on Naval Affairs.

The airship first flew on 21 April, aloft over northern Ohio for nearly 13 hours with 105 aboard, just over a fortnight after the loss of Akron in which Admiral Moffett and 72 others were killed. Macon was commissioned into the U.S. Navy on 23 June 1933, with Commander Alger H. Dresel in command.

=== 1933 ===
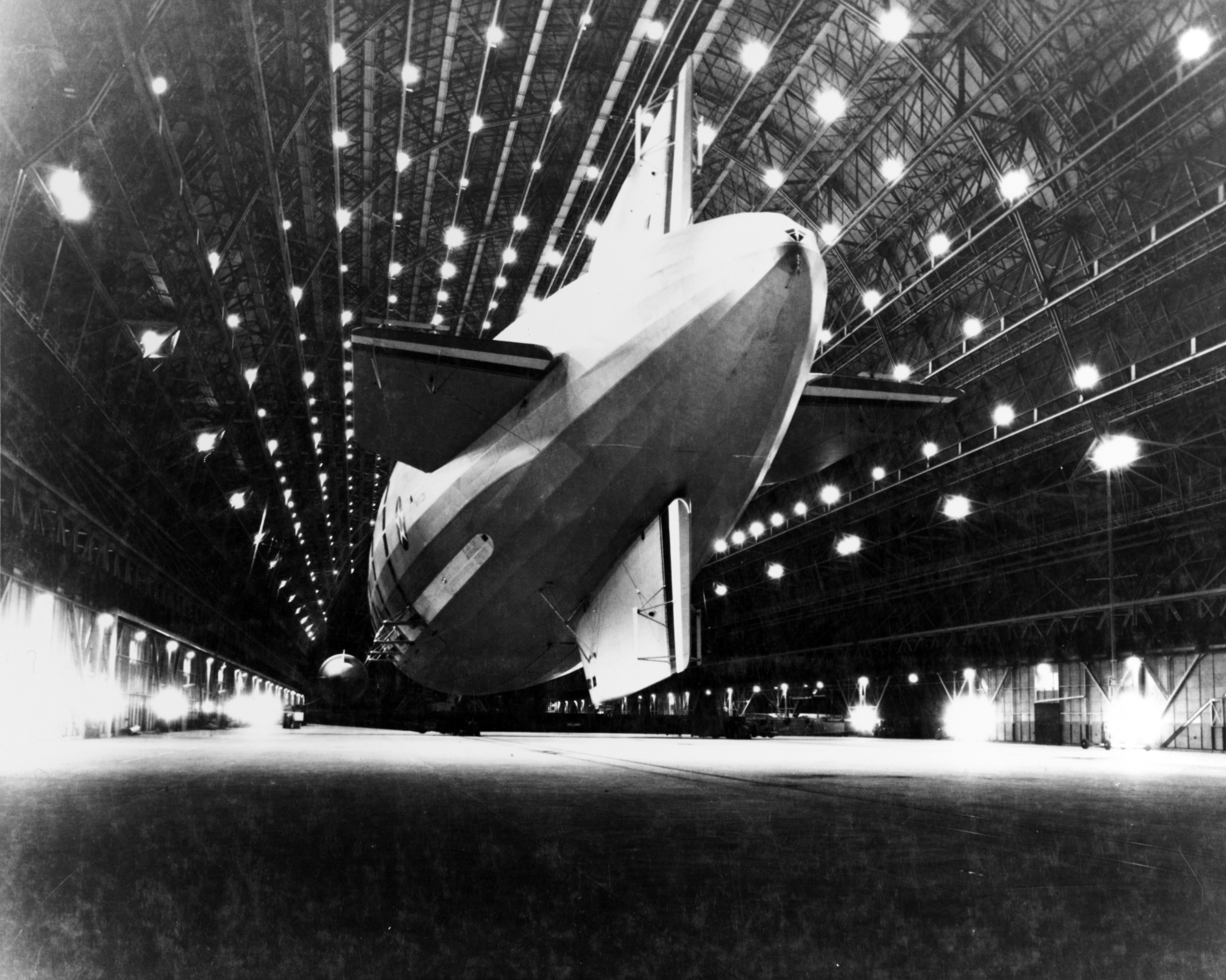
Macon moored in Hangar One at NAS Moffett Field in 1933

On 24 June 1933, Macon left Goodyear's field for Naval Air Station (NAS) Lakehurst, New Jersey, where the new airship was based for the summer while undergoing a series of training flights.

Macon had a far more productive career than Akron, which crashed on 4 April 1933. The commanders of Macon developed the doctrine and techniques of using her on-board aircraft for scouting while the airship remained out of sight of the opposing forces during exercises. Macon participated in several fleet exercises, though the men who framed and conducted the exercises lacked an understanding of the airship's capabilities and weaknesses. It became standard practice to remove the landing gear of the Sparrowhawks while aboard the airship and then replace it with a fuel tank, thus giving the aircraft 30 percent more range.

Some design details

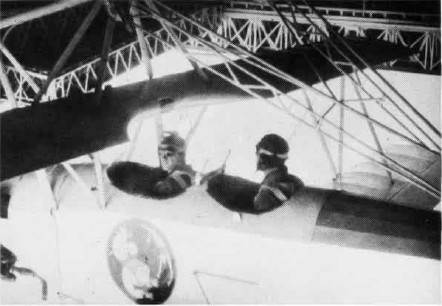
Inside Macon's aircraft hangar

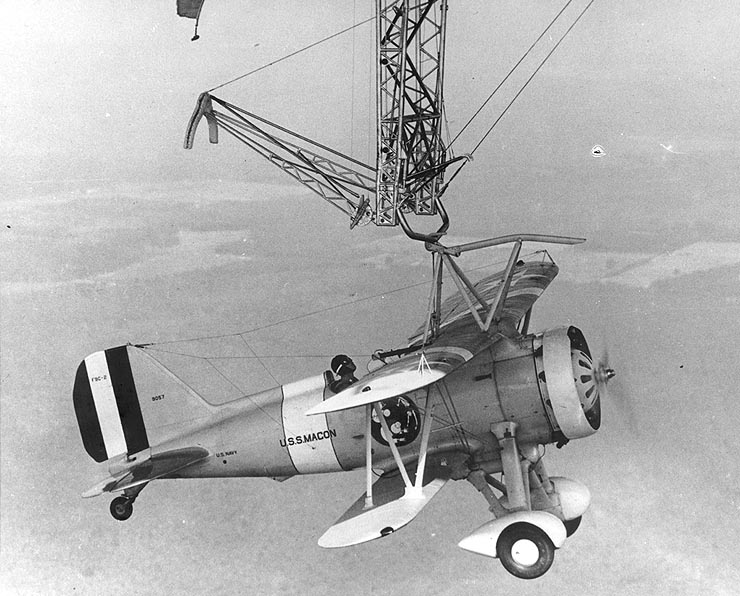
Sparrowhawk scout/fighter aircraft on its exterior rigging

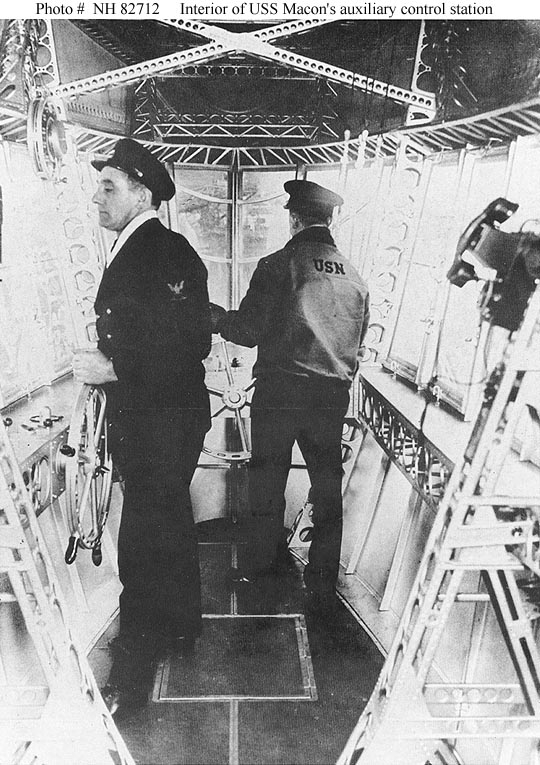
Inside Macon's secondary control node

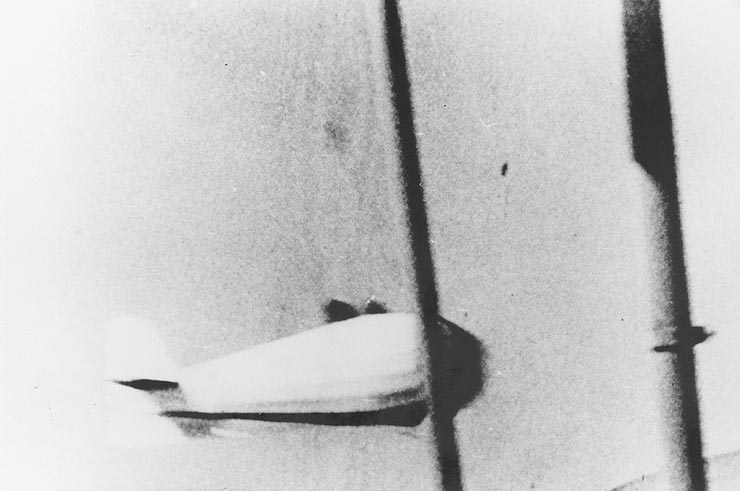
Aerial reconnaissance "spy car" observer's basket which could be lowered below clouds with a tether

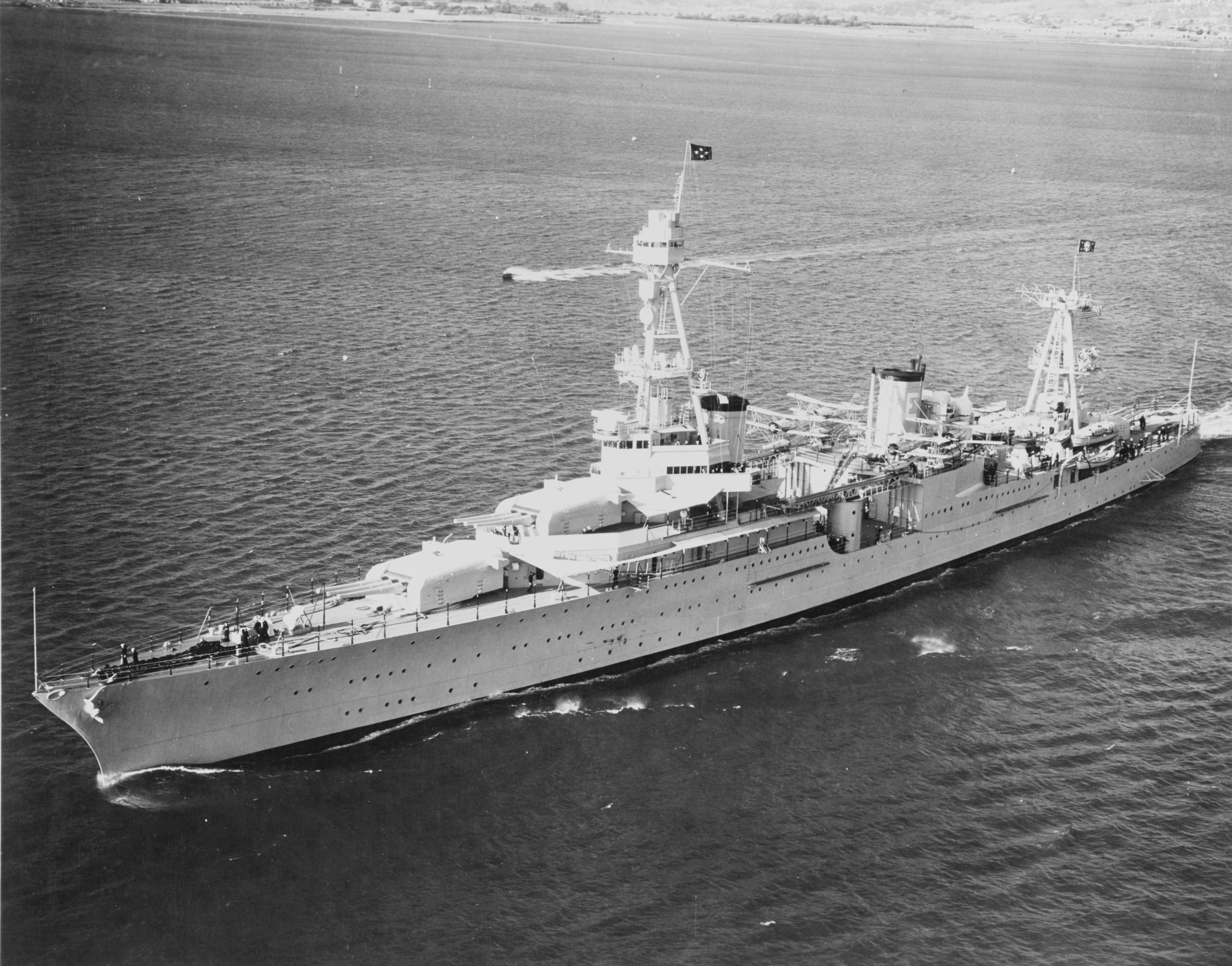
While on a long duration flight over the Pacific, Macon was able to locate and track the cruiser Houston, which was carrying President Roosevelt on a trip to Hawaii from Washington.

Macon first operated aircraft on 6 July 1933 during trial flights out of Lakehurst, New Jersey. The planes were stored in bays inside the hull and were launched and retrieved using a trapeze.

The airship left the East Coast on 12 October 1933, on a transcontinental flight to her new permanent homebase at NAS Sunnyvale (now Moffett Federal Airfield) near San Francisco in Santa Clara County, California.

=== 1934 ===
In 1934, two two-seat Waco UBF XJW-1 biplanes equipped with skyhooks were delivered to USS Macon.

In June 1934, Lieutenant Commander Herbert V. Wiley took command of the airship, and planned a high-profile demonstration of the ability of the Macon to successfully locate enemy ships at sea. In July, President Franklin D. Roosevelt was travelling aboard the heavy cruiser Houston to Hawaii, accompanied by the New Orleans. Despite the location of the ship being top secret (and having made a detour to Clipperton Island after transiting the Panama Canal), the Macon successfully located the ships on July 19. Using the Macon's Sparrowhawk biplanes, newspapers and magazines were dropped to the president on the ship.

Despite its success, Fleet Commander Admiral Joseph M. Reeves and other Navy officials were displeased with the unsanctioned demonstration. However, Rear Admiral Ernest J. King, who was in command of the Naval Bureau of Aviation, and the president were impressed. A communication from the Houston to the Macon after the mail delivery read: "from Houston: 1519 The President compliments you and your planes on your fine performance and excellent navigation 1210 and 1519 Well Done and thank you for the papers the President 1245."

Prior to serving on the Macon, Wiley was one of only three survivors of the crash of the Akron. He was later promoted to commander and captained the battleship West Virginia in the final two years of World War II. He retired from the Navy in 1947 as a rear admiral.

== Loss ==
=== Leading up to the crash ===
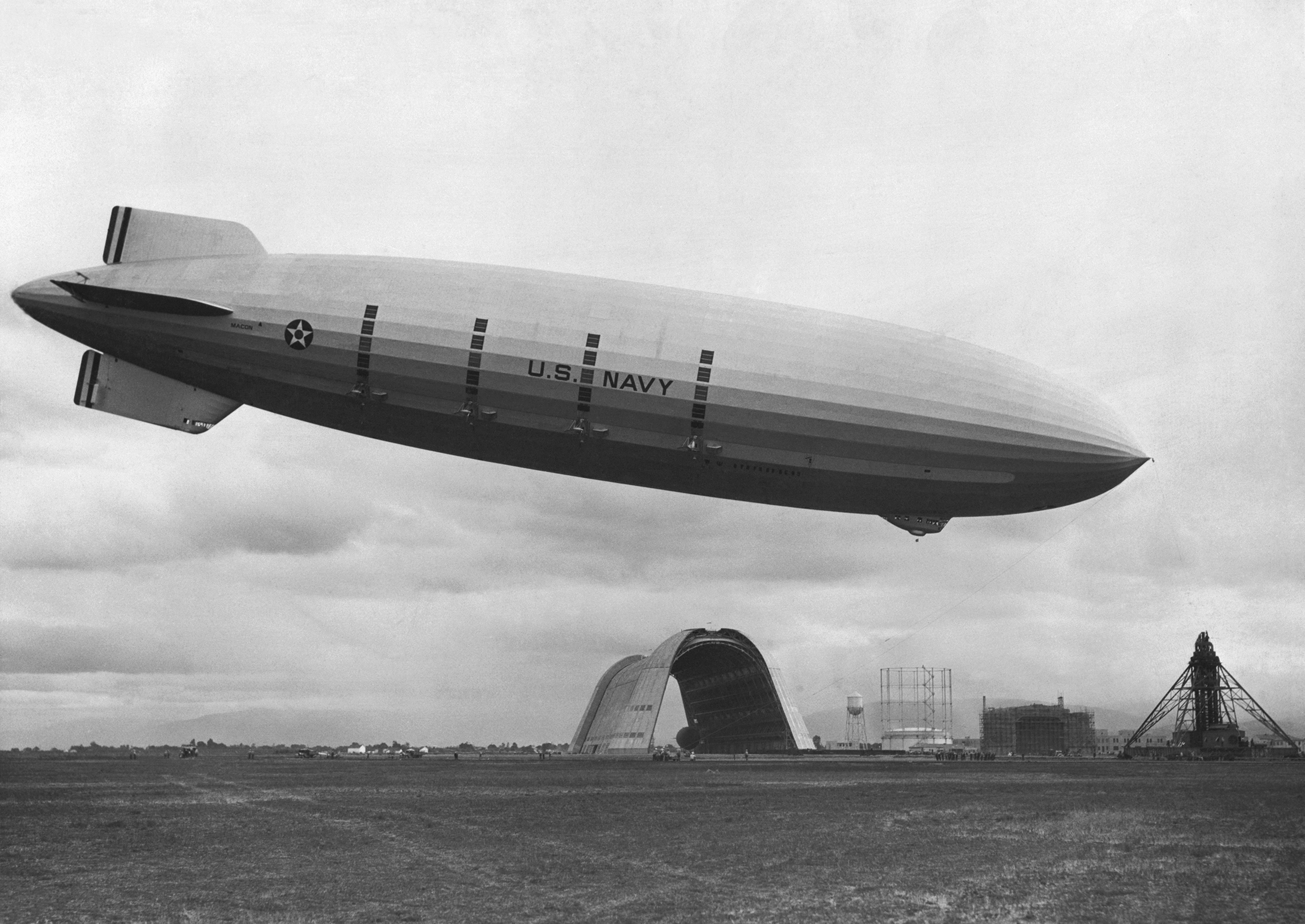
Macon over Moffett Field

On 20 April 1934, the Macon left Sunnyvale for a challenging cross-continent flight east to Opa-locka, Florida. As with the Akron in 1932, Macon had to fly at or above pressure height when crossing the mountains, especially over Dragoon Pass, Arizona, at an elevation of 4,629 ft (1,411 m). Then, in the West Texas heat, the sun raised the helium temperature, and the expanding gas was automatically venting as the airship again reached pressure height. As the weather grew more turbulent, Macon had to rely on full engine power to maintain control. Following a severe gust near Van Horn, Texas, a diagonal girder in frame 17.5, near the fin junction, failed, followed soon by a second diagonal girder. Rapid damage control, led by Chief Boatswain's Mate Robert J. Davis, repaired the girders within a half hour.

Macon completed the rest of the journey safely, mooring at Opa-locka on 22 April. Over the course of nine days, more permanent repairs were made to the damaged girders; however, the addition of duralumin channels to reinforce frame 17.5 at its junction with the upper fin was not completed. Grounding the Macon until these reinforcements were made was considered unnecessary at that time.

=== Crash ===
Location of wreck

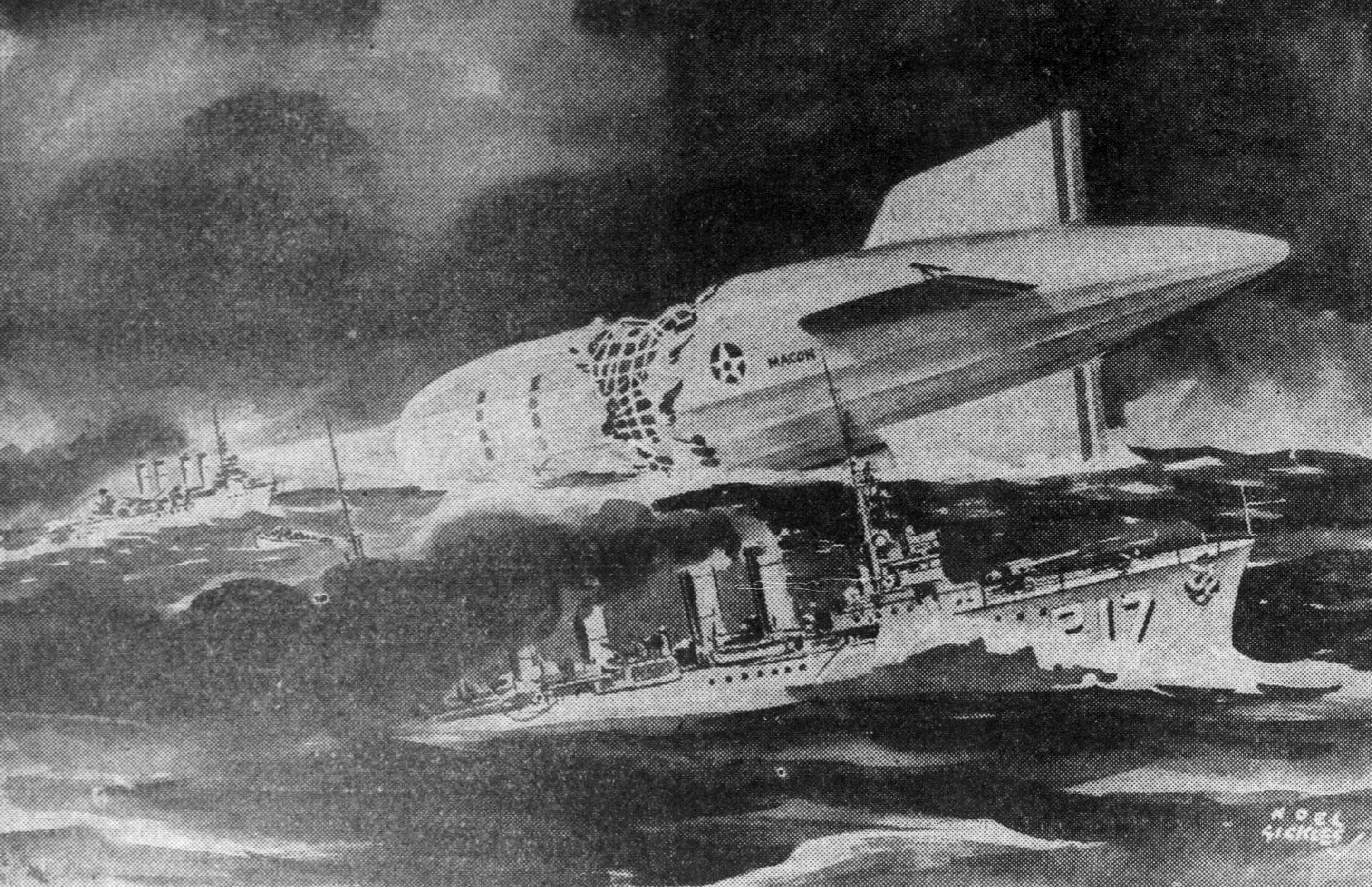
Noel Sickle's "artist's conception" of the wreck, as distributed by the Associated Press

On 12 February 1935, the repair process was still incomplete when, returning to Sunnyvale from fleet maneuvers, Macon ran into a storm off Point Sur, California. During the storm, the ship was caught in a wind shear which caused structural failure of the unstrengthened ring (17.5) to which the upper tailfin was attached. The fin failed to the side and was carried away. Pieces of structure punctured the rear gas cells and caused gas leakage. The commander, acting rapidly and on fragmentary information, ordered an immediate and massive discharge of ballast. Control was lost and, tail heavy and with engines running full speed ahead, Macon rose past the pressure height of 2,800 ft (850 m), and kept rising until enough helium was vented to cancel the lift, reaching an altitude of 4,850 ft (1,480 m). The last SOS call from Commander Wiley stated "Will abandon ship as soon as we land on the water somewhere 20 miles off of Pt. Sur, probably 10 miles at sea." It took 20 minutes to descend and, settling gently into the sea, Macon sank off Monterey Bay.

Only two crew members were lost thanks to the warm conditions and the introduction of life jackets and inflatable rafts after the Akron tragedy. Radioman 1st Class Ernest Edwin Dailey jumped ship while still too high above the ocean surface to survive the fall and Mess Attendant 1st Class Florentino Edquiba drowned while swimming back into the wreckage to try to retrieve personal belongings. An officer was rescued when Commander Wiley swam to his aid, an action for which he was later decorated. Sixty-four survivors were picked up by the cruiser Richmond, the cruiser Concord took 11 aboard and the cruiser Cincinnati saved six.

Eyewitness Dorsey A. Pulliam, serving aboard Colorado, wrote about the crash in a letter dated 13 February 1935:

Tuesday it was so rough, and with the rain, we had an awful time getting along. We had gunnery drill Tuesday and more fleet maneuvers. The Macon came out about 1 pm Tues. to maneuver with the fleet and to enter Frisco with us this morning. The Macon came out in the storm not knowing that she would never get back to land. The Macon circled high above the fleet all the afternoon, and about 6 o'clock, radio messages began coming in that the Macon had had casualties and would have to land. The C.C. of the fleet radioed all ships in company with us to go at full speed for the wreckage. The crew abandoned it as soon as it hit the water, and all were saved except two. There were 83 men in the crew. The wreckage sank within a few minutes after it hit the water. We lingered around the spot where it sank looking for any parts which might be floating around. The search lights on all ships were combing the waters all through the night. The crew to the Macon were floating around in rubber floats and almost froze to death. I had to read about the Akron disaster, but this one I witnessed. The commander Clay had just been transferred to the Macon from this ship. This may contradict with the papers, but this is straight. There was an explosion in the tail and they could not control it.

In another letter, dated 16 February 1935, Pulliam wrote:

I guess that you all read all about the wreck of the Macon. Well, the papers out here were full. I guess the Navy sunk about 3 million dollars there in about 20 minutes. The people will have to pay that back in taxes. It sure was a pity that the Macon had to sink. It sure was pretty sailing around when the sun was shining on it. There sure was plenty excitement on board here that night. Everybody was trying to see what had happened. When the thing hit the water, the gas caught on fire and burned almost all night on the surface of the water after the bulk of the wreckage had sank. The Macon was supposed to go to Hawaii in May. They had started fixing up a field for it.

Macon, after 50 flights since she was commissioned, was stricken from the Navy list on 26 February 1935. Subsequent airships for Navy use were of a nonrigid design.

A depiction of the crash by artist Noel Sickles was the first illustration sent over the new AP wirephoto service, which Associated Press had launched at the beginning of 1935. Sickles said he had about two hours to draw the scene only knowing that the Macon had crashed at sea. He correctly guessed the Navy would send cruisers to aid the airship.

== Wreck site exploration ==
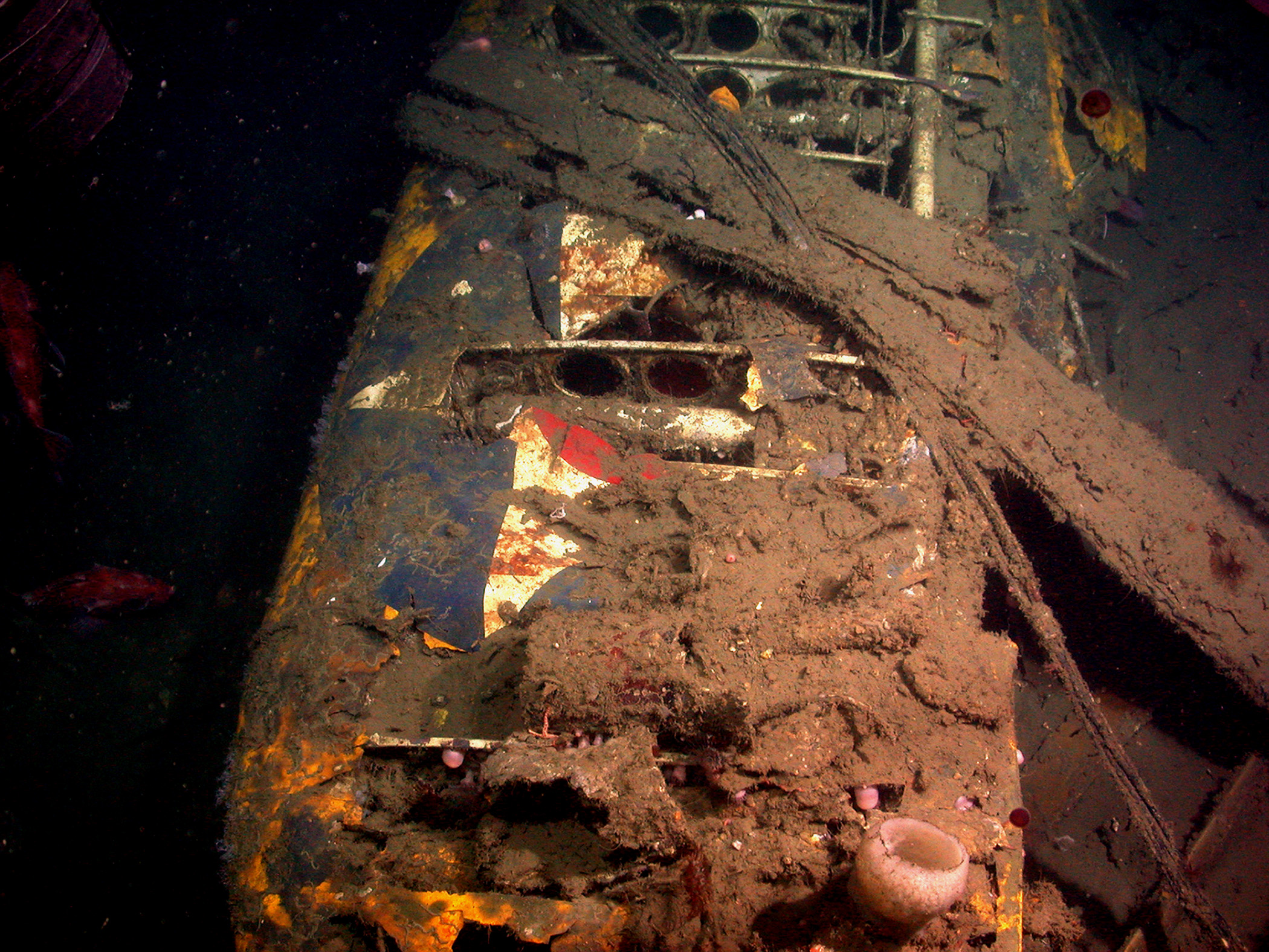
The pre-1941 pattern U.S. roundel emblem still recognizable on the sunken wreckage of a Macon airplane

The Monterey Bay Aquarium Research Institute (MBARI) succeeded in locating and surveying the debris field of Macon in February 1991, and was able to recover some artifacts. The exploration included sonar, video, and still camera data, as well as some recovery of parts.

In May 2005, MBARI returned to the site as part of a year-long research project to identify archaeological resources in the bay. Side-scan sonar was used to survey the site.

=== 2006 expedition ===
A more complete return, including exploration with remotely operated vehicles and involving researchers from MBARI, Stanford University, and the National Oceanic and Atmospheric Administration's Office of National Marine Sanctuaries, took place in September 2006. Video clips of the expedition were made available to the public through the OceansLive Web Portal, a service of NOAA.

The 2006 expedition was a success, and revealed a number of new surprises and changes since the last visit, approximately 15 years previous. High-definition video and more than 10,000 new images were captured, which were assembled into a navigation-grade image mosaic of the wreck.

=== Protection ===
- U.S.S. Macon Airship Remains
- U.S. National Register of Historic Places
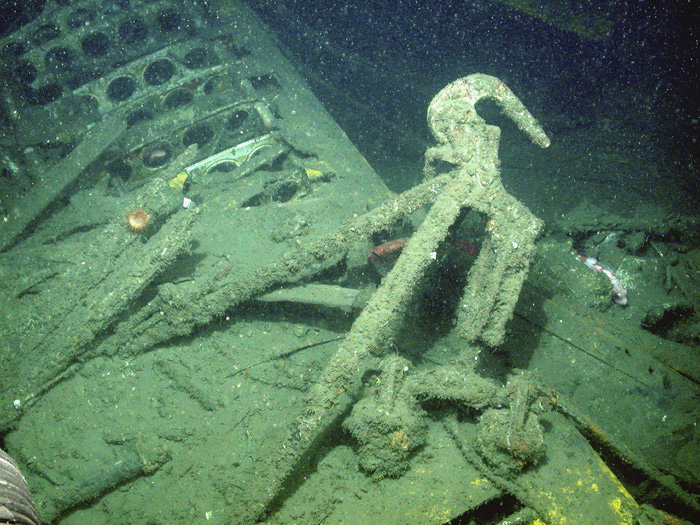
- Sky hook visible on the remains of one of Macon's F9C-2 biplanes (2006)
- Location: Monterey Bay National Marine Sanctuary, Big Sur, California
- Coordinates: 36°17′27″N 121°59′52″W
- Area: 5654.7 square meters
- NRHP reference No.: 09001274
- Added to NRHP: 29 January 2010

The location of the wreck site remains secret and is within the Monterey Bay National Marine Sanctuary. It is not accessible to divers due to depth (1,500 ft or 460 m).

The U.S. National Park Service states:

When the USS Macon was christened on 11 March 1933, the rigid airship was the most sophisticated of the Navy's lighter-than-air (LTA) fleet. The Macon exhibited the highest expression of naval LTA technology during the ship's short career. At 785 feet in length, the airship's size captured American fascination during flyovers of U.S. communities as chronicled in numerous advertisements, articles, and newsreels. The dramatic loss of the Macon and sister ship Akron within two years of each other contributed to the cancellation of the Navy's rigid airship program. The archeological remains of the USS Macon lie off California's Big Sur coast in NOAA's Monterey Bay National Marine Sanctuary. The site also contains the remains of four of the airship's squadron of small Curtiss F9C Sparrowhawk scout aircraft which the Macon carried in an internal hangar bay.

The site was listed on the U.S. National Register of Historic Places on 29 January 2010. The listing was announced as the featured listing in the National Park Service's weekly list of 12 February 2010.

== In popular culture ==
Footage of the Macon is used in the 1933 disaster film Deluge.

Macon is featured toward the end of the 1934 Warner Bros. film Here Comes the Navy starring James Cagney, Pat O'Brien and Gloria Stuart. Cagney's character is assigned to Macon after serving on USS Arizona, which is featured heavily in the film.

The crash of Macon is depicted at the beginning of the 1937 film The Go Getter, featuring George Brent as her helmsman.

Macon is featured as a setting and key plot element in Max McCoy's 1995 novel Indiana Jones and the Philosopher's Stone; Indiana Jones travels aboard Macon while she makes a transatlantic flight to London.

== See also ==
- List of airships of the United States Navy
- List of airship accidents
- Hangar One, built to house Macon

== Bibliography ==
- Brennan, Lawrence B. (May 2019). "Naval Air Station Lakehurst: Part II: The Last Two Lakehurst US Navy Dirigibles, USS Akron (ZRS 4) and USS Macon (ZRS 5)" (PDF). New Jersey Postal History. 47 (214).
- Miller, Henry M. (1975). Human Error: Road to Disaster. Canyon Books. ISBN 0-89014-128-2.
- Robinson, Douglas H. & Keller, Charles L. (1982). "Up Ship!": U.S. Navy Rigid Airships 1919–1935. Annapolis, Maryland: Naval Institute Press. ISBN 0-87021-738-0.
- Robinson, Douglas H. (1973). Giants in the Sky. Henley-on-Thames: Foulis. ISBN 0-85429-145-8.
- Smith, Richard K (1965). The Airships Akron & Macon: Flying Aircraft Carriers of the United States Navy. Annapolis, Maryland: United States Naval Institute. ISBN 0-87021-065-3.
