= Spy basket =

Spy Construct used for undetected Zeppeline-observations

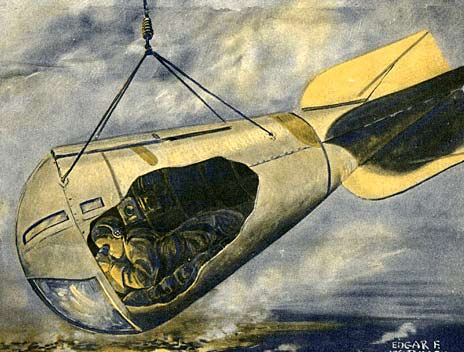
Observatory car drawing from a December 1916 Scientific American cover

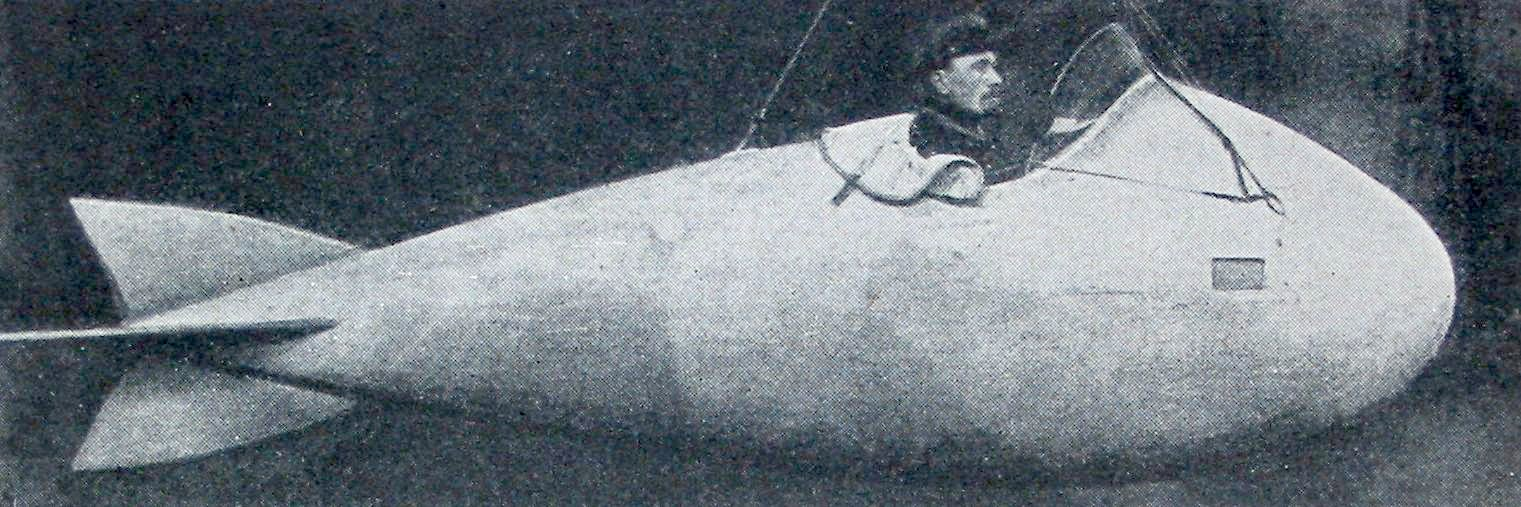
Jaray fish-shaped spy gondola while crewed

The spy gondola, spy basket, observation car or sub-cloud car (German: Spähgondel or Spähkorb) is a crewed vessel that an airship hiding in cloud cover could lower several hundred metres to a point below the clouds in order to inconspicuously observe the ground and help navigate the airship. It was a byproduct of Peilgondel development (a gondola to weight an airship's radio-locating antenna). They were used almost exclusively by the Germans in the First World War on their military airships.

== Development ==
The Peilgondel was developed by Paul Jaray to act as a heavy plumbbob for an airship's radio antenna. A free-hanging antenna wire would move and flex in the wind, hindering communications; the added weight reduced this movement. Jaray then developed the Peilgondel further into a crewed spy gondola.

== Use ==
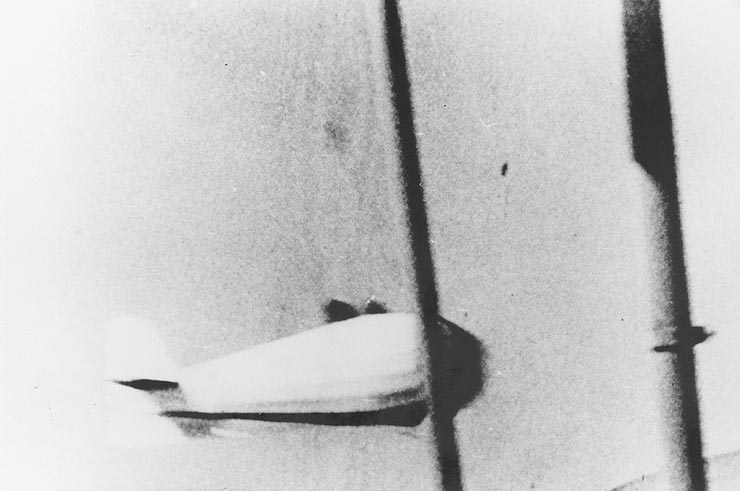
An aeroplane photographed this spy basket in operation hanging from the American USS Macon in 1934-09-27.

Spy baskets were used on, among others, Schütte-Lanz and Zeppelin airships. As of 1937, it was not always certain which airships used them: the blueprints for LZ 62 (L 30) and LZ 72 (L 31) included the spy basket operating plant but the German Navy was no longer installing them at that time; however a fish-shaped spy basket can be seen on photographs of the German Army LZ 83 (tactical number LZ 113). After the war the Americans briefly experimented with a spy basket on the USS Akron.

== Zeppelin spy basket development and use ==
Captain Ernst A. Lehmann, the German airship captain, described in his book The Zeppelins how he and Baron Gemmingen, Count Zeppelin's nephew, had developed the device. To test the prototype he blindfolded the helmsman of the airship and allowed himself to be lowered by a winch from the bombroom in a modified cask, equipped with a telephone. Hanging some 150 metres (500 ft) below the airship using a compass he could tell the blindfolded helmsman which bearing to take and effectively drive the airship. He later recounted how, while returning from the aborted raid on London in March 1916 in the Z 12, Baron Gemmingen insisted on being the first to use it on their secondary target, Calais. The basket was equipped with a wicker chair, chart table, electric lamp, compass, telephone, and lightning conductor. With the Zeppelin sometimes within, sometimes above the clouds and unable to see the ground, Gemmingen in the hanging basket would relay orders on navigation and when and which bombs to drop. The Calais defenders could hear the engines but their searchlights and artillery fire did not reach the airship.

LZ26's basket was lowered from the airship on a specially constructed tether 1,000 metres (3,300 ft) long; other airships may have used one approximately 750 metres (2,460 ft) long. The tether was high grade steel with a brass core insulated with rubber to act as the telephone cable.

Despite Gemmingen reporting a feeling of loneliness while being lowered and losing sight of the airship, crewmen would nevertheless volunteer for this duty because it was the one place where they could smoke.

== Surviving examples ==
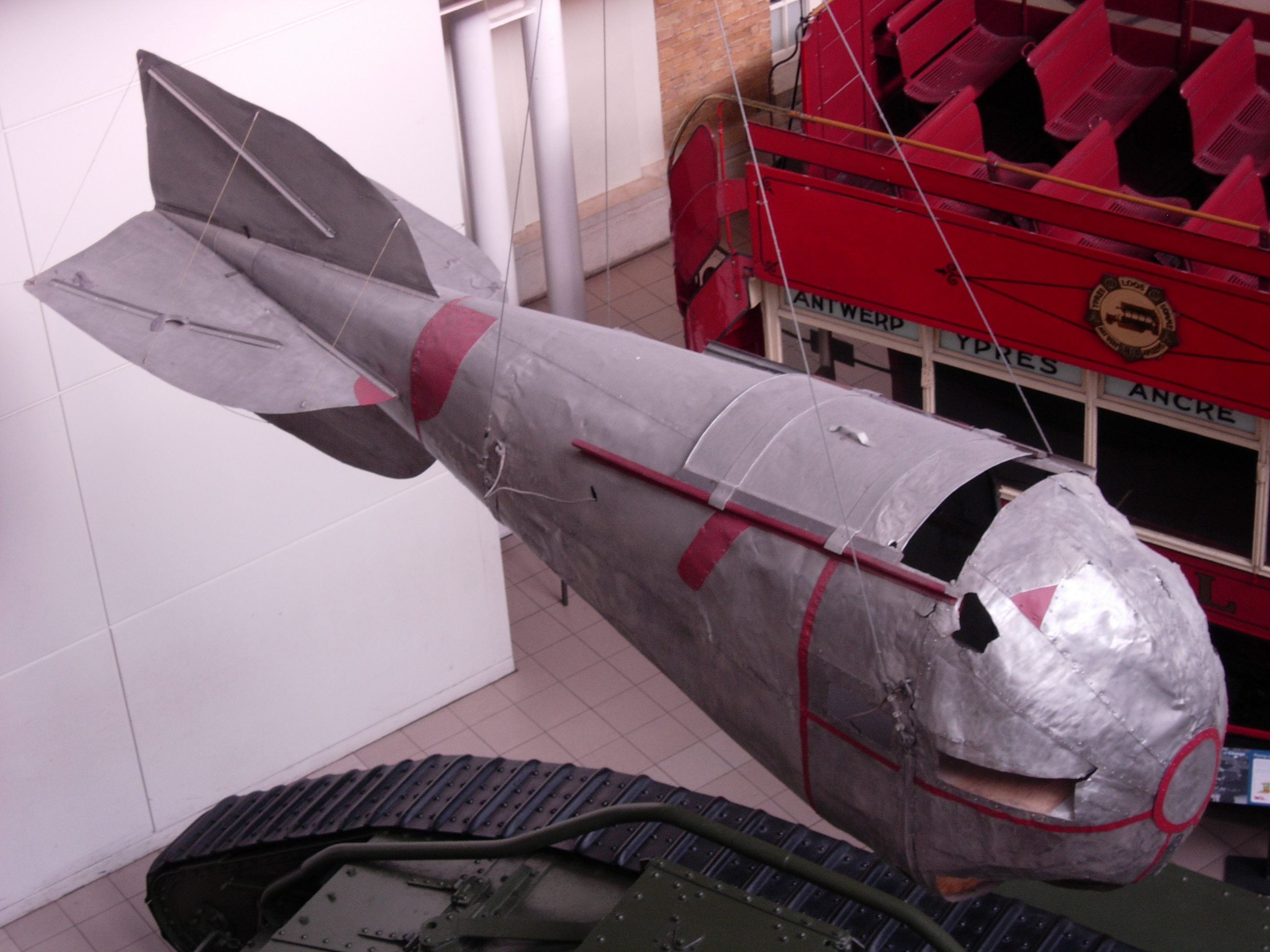
A spy basket preserved at the Imperial War Museum, which fell from the LZ 90 on 2 to 3 September 1916

The Imperial War Museum in London exhibits a Zeppelin observation car that was found near Colchester alongside 1500 metres of cable after the Zeppelin air raid on the night of the September 2–3, 1916. It is believed to have been carried by the LZ 90 and was being deployed uncrewed when the winch accidentally ran out of control. The winch was jettisoned by the crew some ways inland near Bury St. Edmunds.

== In fiction ==
The spy basket's use is dramatized in the 1930 film Hell's Angels and in the long-running British comic Charley's War (1979–1986). In both stories, ruthless German airship commanders order the jettisoning of their ship's cloud car (with the observer still in it) to save weight when their airships come under attack.

The spy basket is seen in the movie Zeppelin.
