= HMS Sparrow =

Eight ships of the Royal Navy have borne the name HMS Sparrow, after the sparrow:

- HMS Sparrow (1653) was a pink captured in 1653 and sold in 1659.
- HMS Sparrow (1796) was the 12-gun mercantile cutter Rattler. Rattler had been launched in 1780, probably under another name, had received a letter of marque in 1793, and then between 1793 and 1796 had served the Royal Navy as a hired armed cutter. The Navy purchased her in 1796 and she captured a number of merchant vessels in the Caribbean. Sparrow was broken up in 1805.
- HMS Sparrow (1805) was a 16-gun Fly-class brig-sloop launched in 1805 and sold in 1816.
- HMS Sparrow (1828) was a 10-gun cutter launched in 1828. She was used as a survey ketch from 1844 and was broken up in 1860.
- HMS Sparrow (1860) was a wood screw Philomel-class gunvessel launched in 1860 and broken up in 1868.
- HMS Sparrow (1889) was a composite screw gunboat launched in 1889. She was transferred to the New Zealand government in 1906 as the training ship NZS Amokura. She was sold as a coal hulk in 1922 and was broken up in 1958.
- HMS Sparrow (1909) was the trawler Josephine purchased from civilian service in 1909 and refitted as a minesweeping training ship for men of the fishery reserve. She was renamed Josephine in January 1920 and sold back into civilian service as Orion in May 1920. She was broken up in 1939.
- HMS Sparrow (U71) was a modified Black Swan-class sloop, launched in 1946 and scrapped in 1958.

== Battle honours ==
- San Sebastián 1813
- Korea 1953

== See also ==
- Ships named HMS Sparrowhawk
