= Curtiss F9C Sparrowhawk =

US Navy biplane fighter aircraft (1931–1937)

F9C Sparrowhawk
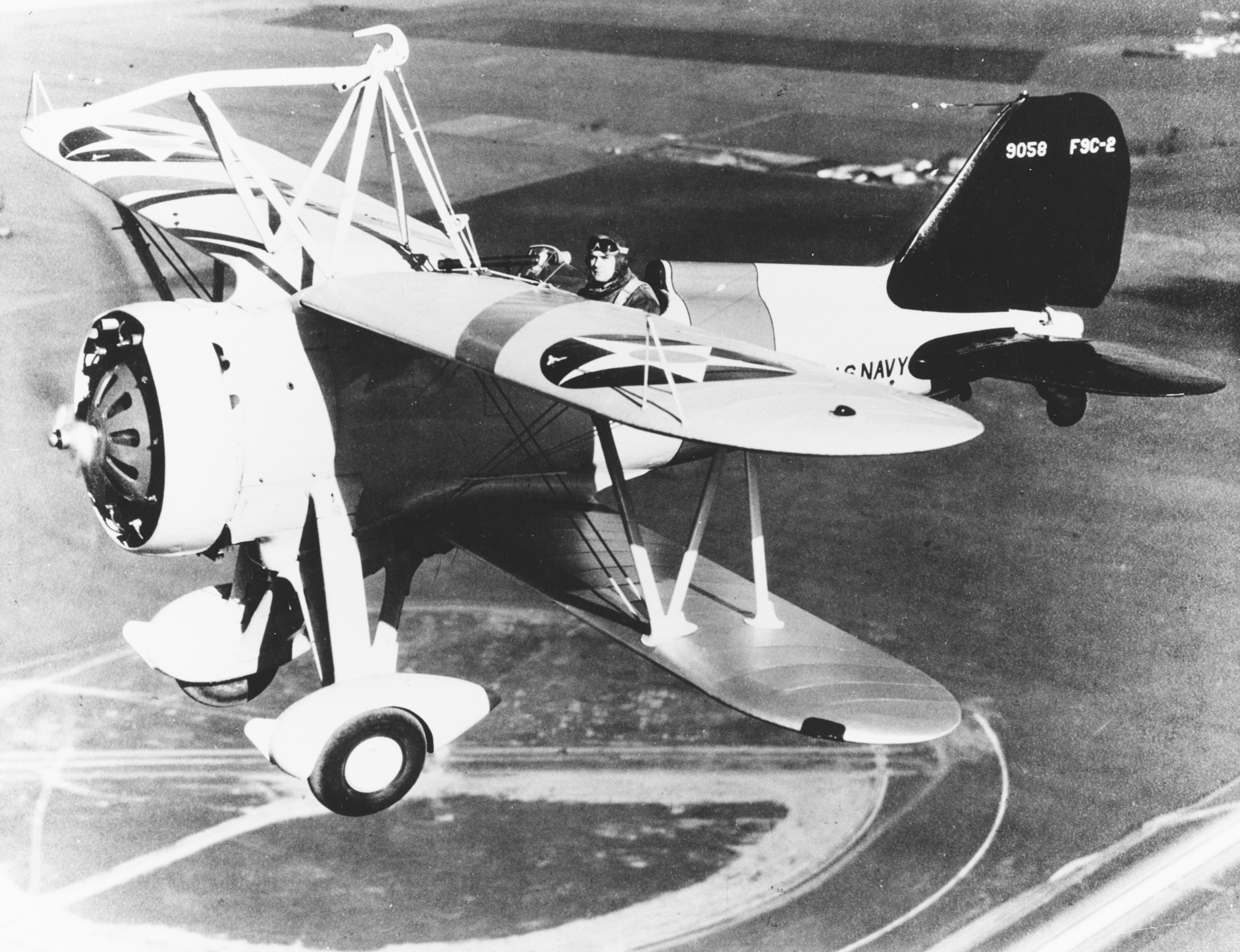
- F9C-2 Sparrowhawk BuNo 9058 in flight over Moffett Field, California in 1934. This aircraft was lost with the USS Macon. Pilot in this photo is Lt. Harold B. Miller, commander of the Heavier-Than-Air Unit.

General information
- Type: Parasite fighter
- Manufacturer: Curtiss Aeroplane and Motor Company
- Status: Retired
- Primary user: United States Navy
- Number built: at least 7

History
- Introduction date: 1931
- First flight: 12 February 1931
- Retired: 1937

The Curtiss F9C Sparrowhawk is a light 1930s biplane fighter aircraft that was carried by the United States Navy airships USS Akron and Macon. It is an example of a parasite fighter, a small airplane designed to be deployed from a larger aircraft such as an airship or bomber.

== Design and development ==
The concept of fixed-wing aircraft being carried and launched from airships was initially developed during the First World War - initially, this proposal originated in the United Kingdom, to allow British interceptors to conserve fuel by being carried to an altitude whereby they could then engage German zeppelins. The increasing use of airships in the armed forces of various countries led to variations on the idea of using aircraft with them, with major uses being for reconnaissance, extending the reach of the airship beyond the horizon, and to provide the airship with a degree of self-defence. In the late 1920s, the US Navy began experimenting with its airships, initially using USS Los Angeles as a platform for testing the concept of the so-called parasite aircraft. The success of these tests led to the decision to build two new airships capable of accommodating an on-board air group of specially designed aircraft. This was ultimately developed into the Curtiss Sparrowhawk.

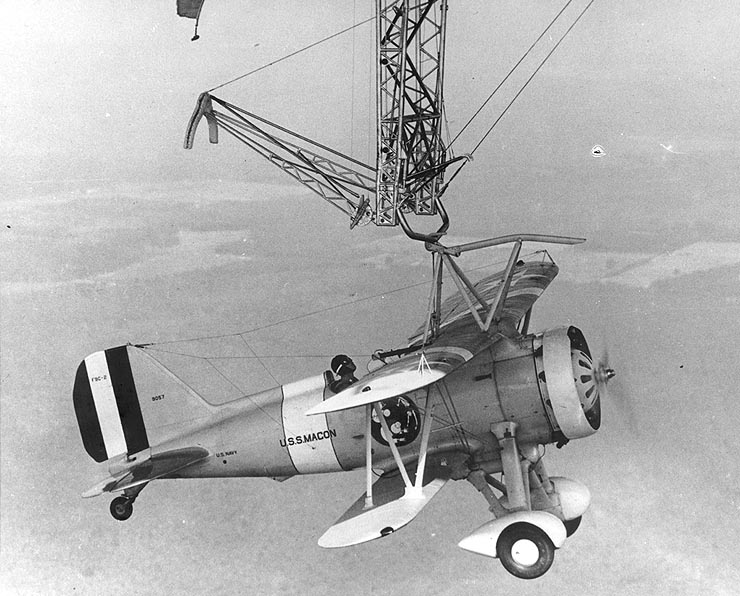
An F9C-2 captures the trapeze aboard Macon in 1933

Although designed as a pursuit plane or fighter, the Sparrowhawk's primary duty in service was reconnaissance, enabling the airships it served to search a much wider area of ocean. The Sparrowhawk was primarily chosen for service aboard the large rigid-framed airships Akron and Macon because of its small size (20.2 ft (6.2 m) long and with only a 25.5 ft (7.8 m) wingspan), though its weight, handling and range characteristics, and also downward visibility from the cockpit, were not ideal for its reconnaissance role. The theoretical maximum capacity of the airships' hangar was five aircraft, one in each hangar bay and one stored on the trapeze but, in the Akron, two structural girders obstructed the aft two hangar bays, limiting her to a maximum complement of three Sparrowhawks. A modification to remove this limitation was pending at the time of the airship's loss. Macon had no such limitation and she routinely carried four airplanes.

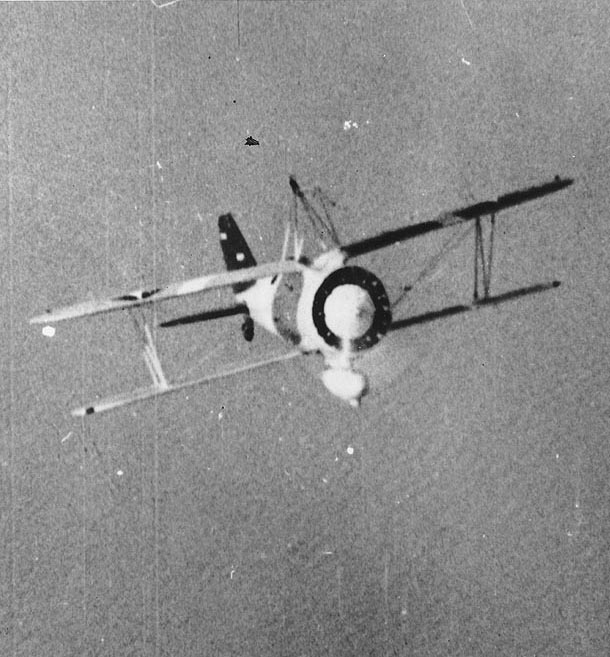
A Sparrowhawk with its undercarriage replaced by an external fuel tank - on deployment, the aircraft, not requiring the use of the undercarriage, would have it removed and replaced with a 30 gallon fuel tank, significantly increasing the aircraft's range

To achieve launching and recovery from the airship in flight, a 'skyhook' system was developed. The Sparrowhawk had a hook mounted above its top wing that attached to the cross-bar of a trapeze mounted on the carrier airship. For launching, the biplane's hook was engaged on the trapeze inside the airship's (internal) hangar, the trapeze was lowered clear of the hull into the (moving) airship's slipstream and, engine running, the Sparrowhawk would then disengage its hook and fall away from the airship. For recovery, the biplane would fly underneath its mother ship, until beneath the trapeze, climb up from below, and hook onto the cross-bar. The width of the trapeze cross-bar allowed a certain lateral lee-way in approach, the biplane's hook mounting had a guide rail to provide protection for the turning propeller (see photo), and engagement of the hook was automatic on positive contact between hook and trapeze. More than one attempt might have to be made before a successful engagement was achieved, for example in gusty conditions. Once the Sparrowhawk was securely caught, it could then be hoisted by the trapeze back within the airship's hull, the engine being cut as it passed the hangar door. Although seemingly a tricky maneuver, pilots soon learned the technique and it was described as being much easier than landing on a moving, pitching and rolling aircraft carrier. Almost inevitably, the pilots soon acquired the epithet "The men on the Flying Trapeze" and their aircraft were decorated with appropriate unit emblems.

Once the system was fully developed, in order to increase their scouting endurance while the airship was on over-water operations, the Sparrowhawks would have their landing gear removed and replaced by a fuel tank. When the airship was returning to base, the biplanes' landing gear would be replaced so that they could land independently again.

For much of their service with the airships, the Sparrowhawks' effectiveness was greatly hampered by their poor radio equipment, and they were effectively limited to remaining within sight of the airship. However, in 1934 new direction-finding sets and new voice radios were fitted which allowed operations beyond visual range, exploiting the extended range offered by the belly fuel tanks and allowing the more vulnerable mother ship to stay clear of trouble.

One interesting use of the Sparrowhawks was to act as 'flying ballast'. The airship could take off with additional ballast or fuel aboard instead of its airplanes. Once the airship was cruising, the aircraft would be flown aboard, the additional weight being supported by dynamic lift until the airship lightened.

== Variants ==
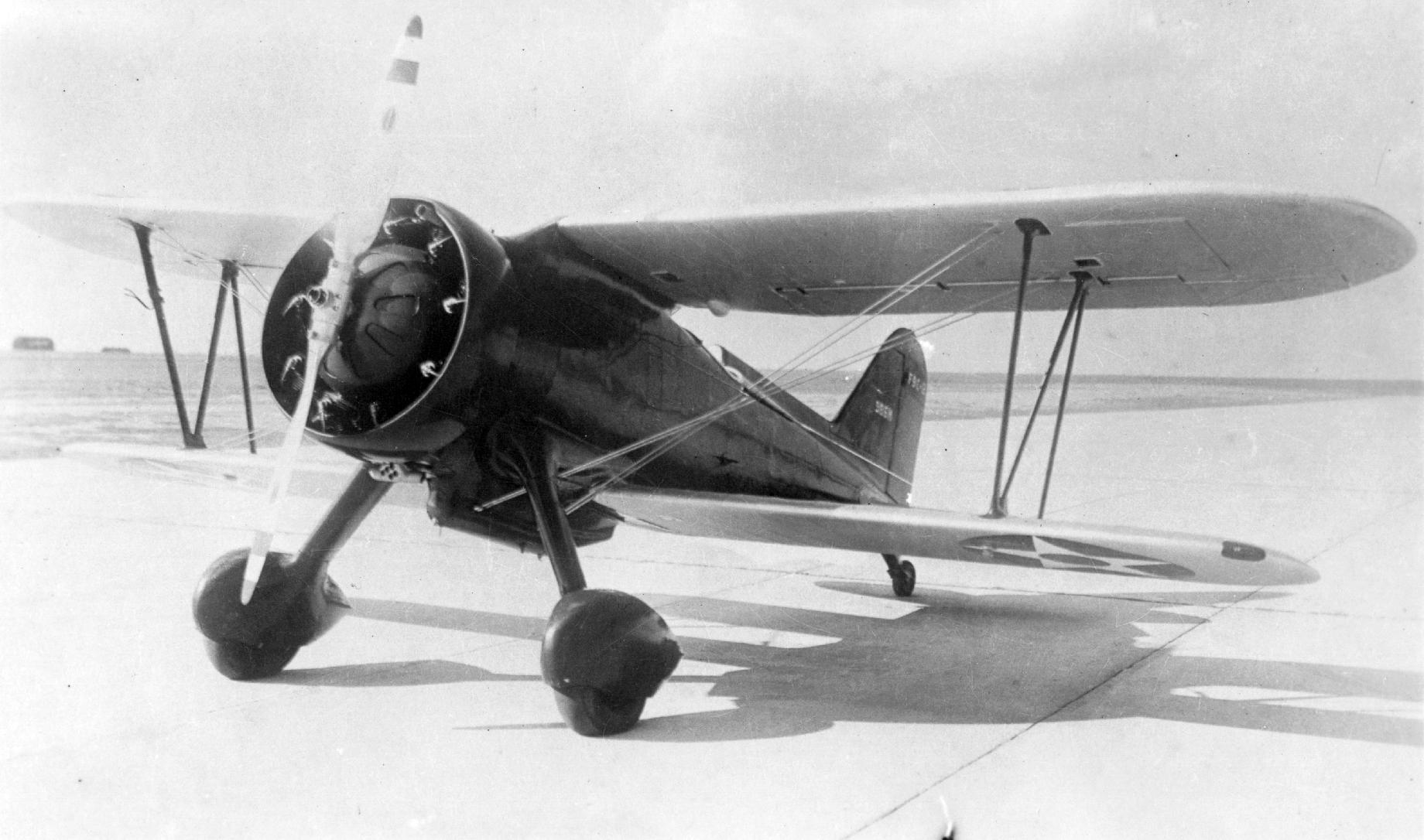
The XF9C-2

XF9C-1
First prototype. One built. BuAer number 8731. Scrapped in 1936.
XF9C-2
Second prototype. One built. BuAer number 9264.
F9C-2 Sparrowhawk
Single-seat fighter biplane. 6 built. BuAer numbers 9056 - 9061

== Operators ==
United States

- United States Navy

== Surviving aircraft ==
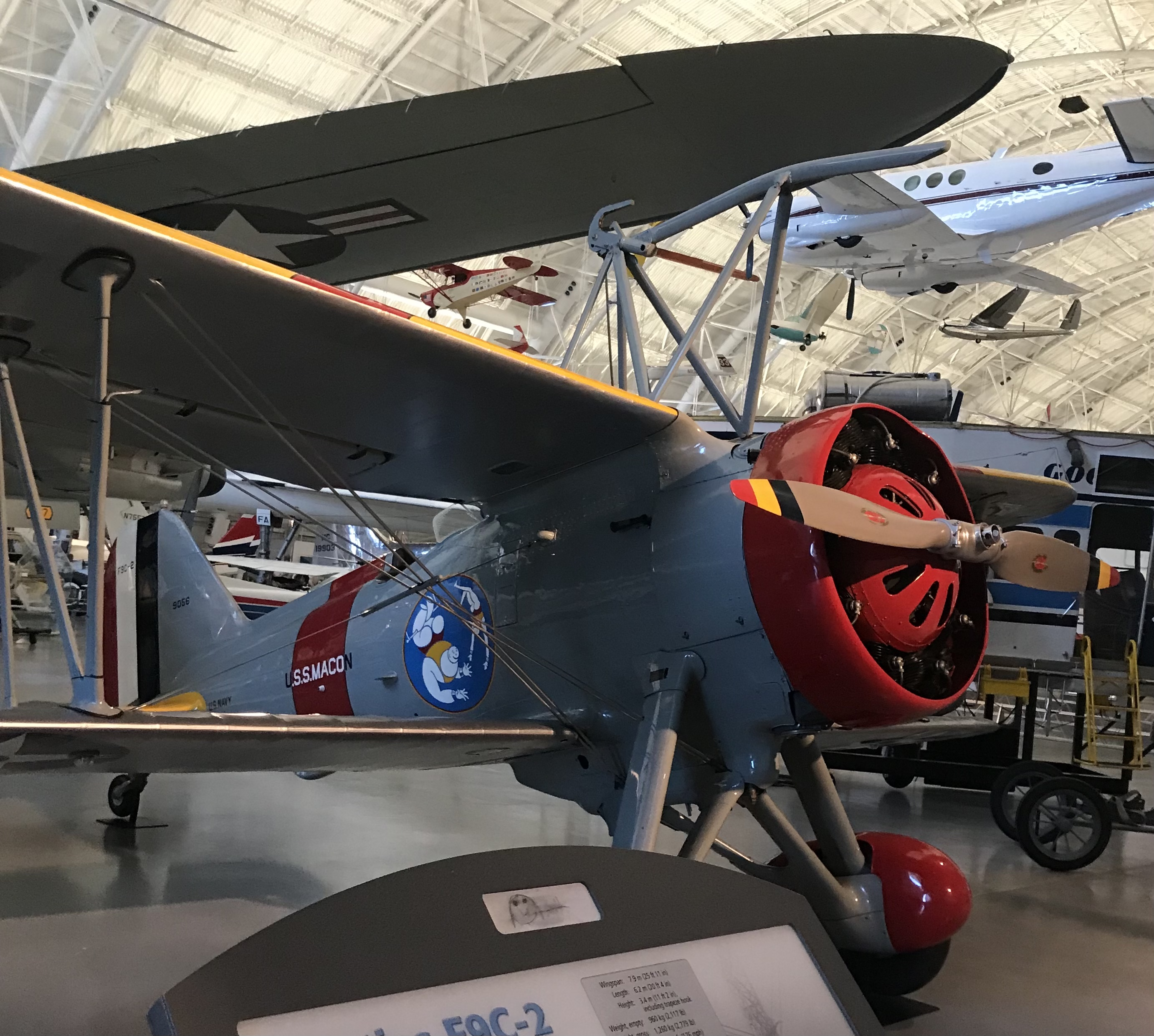
F9C-2 number 9056 on display at the Steven F. Udvar-Hazy Center (2024)

Only one intact Sparrowhawk survives today. Bureau of Aeronautics (BuAer) number 9056 was pending write-off at NAS Hampton Roads in 1939 when it was transferred to the Smithsonian Institution. In later years it had been rebuilt, using parts from the surviving F9C-2 (BuAer number 9057) and the XF9C-2 (9264). It was previously at the National Museum of Naval Aviation, at NAS Pensacola, and is currently displayed at the Steven F. Udvar-Hazy Center of the Smithsonian's National Air and Space Museum collection, wearing the markings of F9C-2 A9056 of USS Macon.

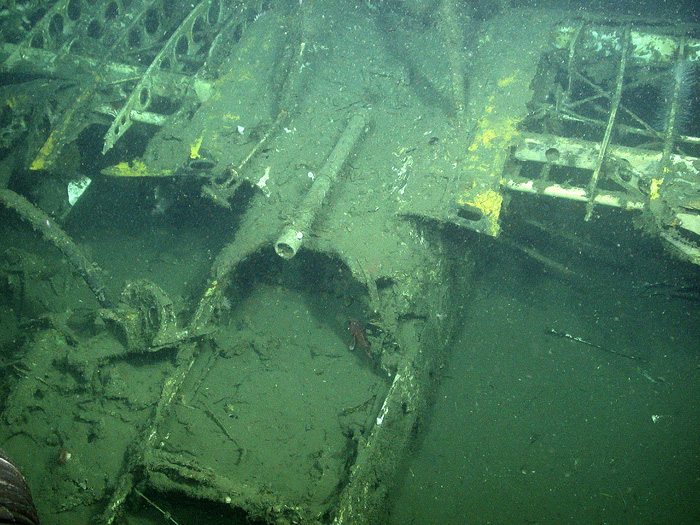
The cockpit of one of the Macon's Sparrowhawks, photographed in 2006. The ribs of the upper wing. and the pilot's telescopic gunsight can be seen.

The remains of a further four aircraft lie at the underwater wreck-site of the Macon; the aircraft were found in their hangar when the wreck was discovered and documented in 1990 and 1991. These are known to have been BuAer numbers 9058 to 9061.

== Specifications (F9C-2) ==
Data from The Airships Akron & Macon: Flying Aircraft carriers of the United States Navy

General characteristics

- Crew: 1
- Length: 20 ft 2.0 in (6.147 m)
- Wingspan: 25 ft 6.0 in (7.772 m)
- Height: 10 ft 6 in (3.2 m)
- Wing area: 172.79 sq ft (16.053 m^{2})
- Airfoil: Clark YH
- Empty weight: 2,089 lb (948 kg)
- Gross weight: 2,776 lb (1,259 kg)
- Powerplant: 1 × Wright R-975-E3 9-cyl. air-cooled radial piston engine, 438 hp (327 kW)

Performance

- Maximum speed: 176.5 mph (284.0 km/h, 153.4 kn)
- Range: 297 mi (478 km, 258 nmi)
- Service ceiling: 19,200 ft (5,900 m)
- Rate of climb: 1,700 ft/min (8.6 m/s)
- Wing loading: 16 lb/sq ft (78 kg/m^{2})
- Power/mass: 0.086 hp/lb (0.259 kW/kg)

Armament

- Guns: 2 × .30 in (7.62 mm) Browning machine guns

== See also ==
Related lists

- List of fighter aircraft
- List of United States Navy aircraft designations (pre-1962)
