= Sparrowhawk Hill =

Coordinates: 19°41′00″N 80°02′00″W

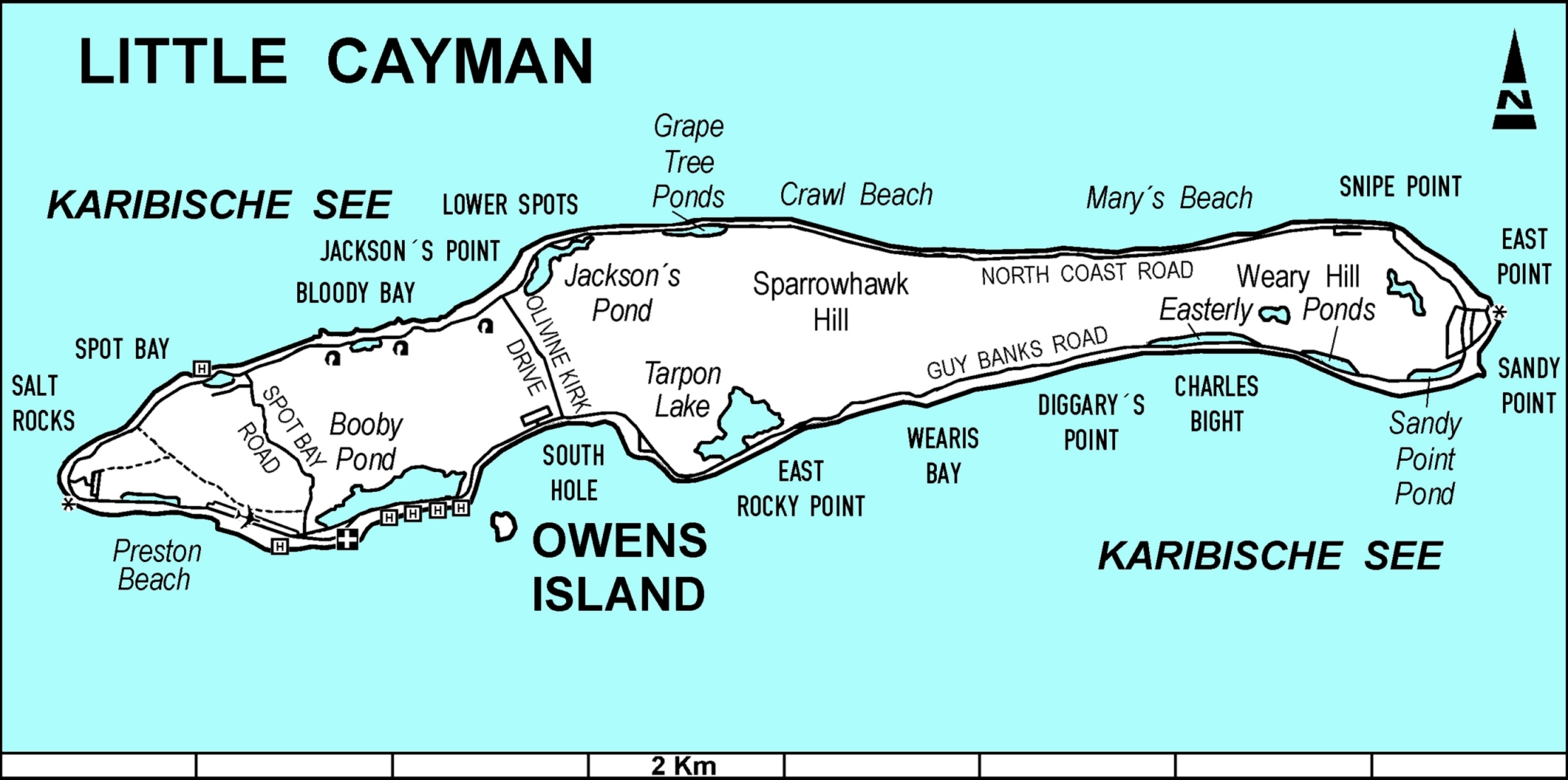
Map of Little Cayman showing Sparrowhawk Hill in the centre of the island

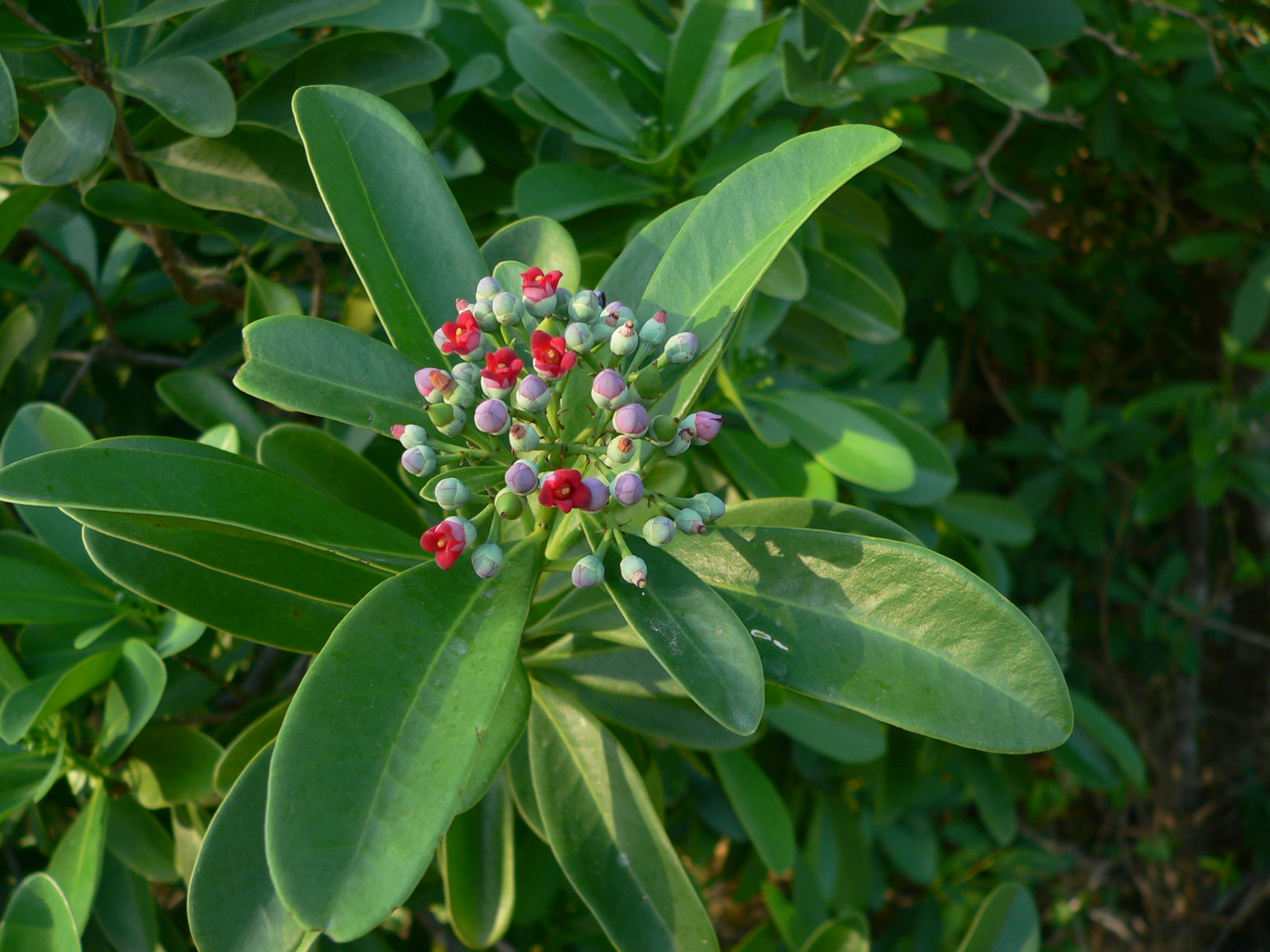
Flowers of Canella winterana, found on Sparrowhawk Hill

Sparrowhawk Hill lies in the centre of Little Cayman, one of the Cayman Islands, a British Overseas Territory in the Caribbean Sea. It is one of the territory's Important Bird Areas (IBAs).

== Description ==
Sparrowhawk Hill is a 255 ha tract of pristine native dry forest with a maximum elevation of 20 m above sea level. Dominant tree species are Calyptranthes pallens, Canella winterana, Chionanthus caymanensis, Dipholis salicifolia and Erythroxylum areolatum.

=== Birds ===
The IBA was identified as such by BirdLife International because it supports significant populations of white-crowned pigeons, Caribbean elaenias and vitelline warblers.
