= HMS Sparrowhawk =

Six ships and two naval air stations of the Royal Navy have been named HMS Sparrowhawk, after the bird of prey, the Eurasian sparrowhawk:

- HMS Sparrowhawk (1807) was an 18-gun Cruizer-class brig-sloop launched in 1807 and sold in 1841.
- HMS Sparrowhawk (1856) was a wooden screw gunboat launched in 1856 and sold in 1872; later a merchant barque, then coal lighter, name unchanged.
- HMS Sparrowhawk (1877) was a survey schooner purchased in 1877. She was originally named Falcon, was HMS Lark on being purchased, but was renamed HMS Sparrowhawk three months later. She was sold in 1889.
- HMS Sparrowhawk (1895) was a Quail-class destroyer launched in 1895 and wrecked in 1904.
- HMS Sparrowhawk (1912) was an Acasta-class destroyer launched in 1912. She was sunk at the Battle of Jutland on 1 June 1916 after colliding with HMS Broke.
- HMS Sparrowhawk (1918) was an S-class destroyer launched in 1918 and scrapped in 1931.
- HMS Sparrowhawk (shore establishment) was the name given to Royal Naval Air Station Hatston, a naval air station of the Fleet Air Arm during World War II, in use between October 1939 to August 1945.
- HMS Sparrowhawk (1945 shore establishment), was a naval air station, RNAS Halesworth, used by the Fleet Air Arm between August 1945 to March 1946.

== See also ==
- HMS Sparrow
