= NAS blimp bases =

Major World War 2 blimps bases

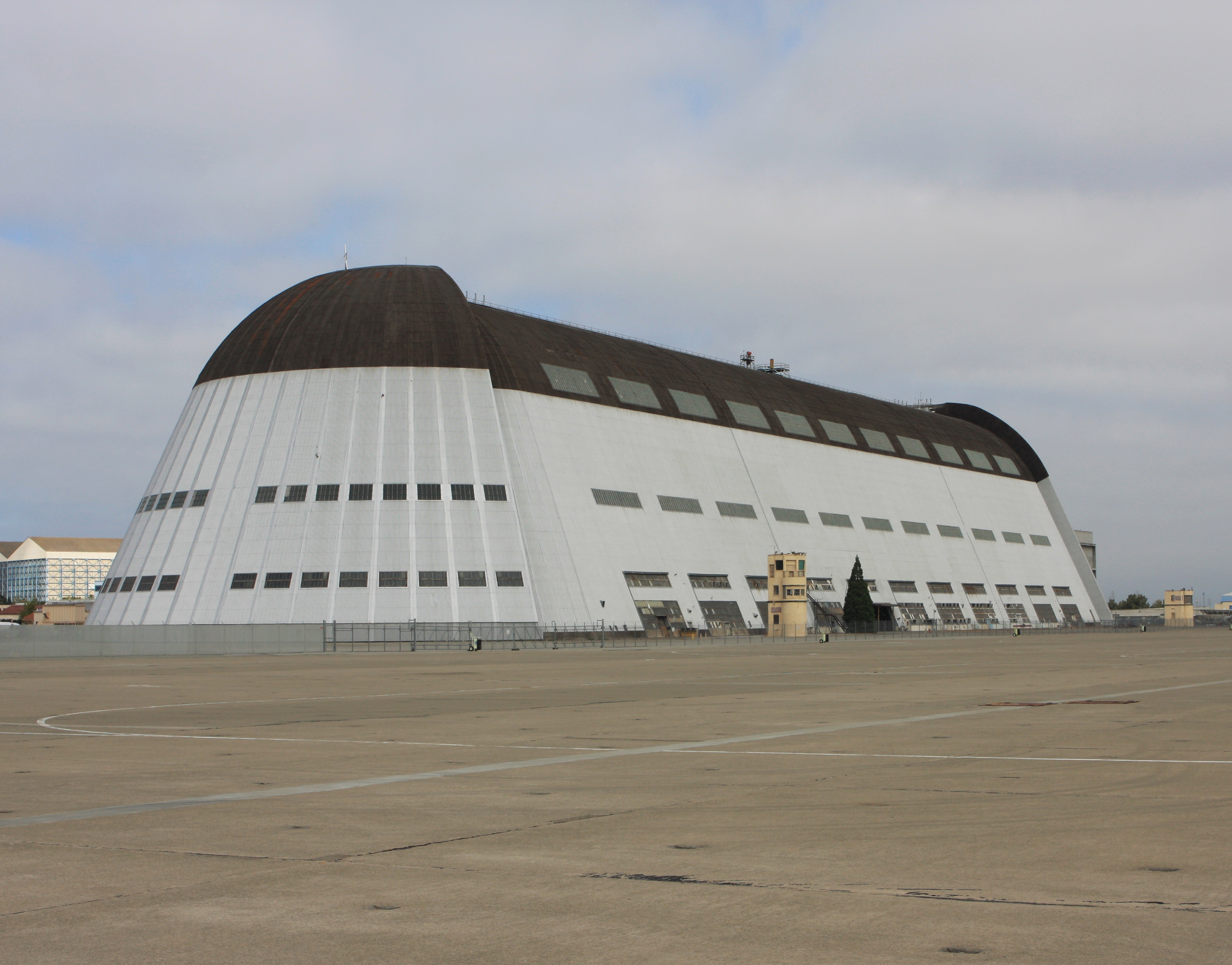
Hangar One at Moffett Federal Airfield

NAS blimp bases, (Navy Air Stations Blimps bases), were United States Navy blimp bases built to protect coastal waters during World War II. Navy Blimps could stay in the air and patrol coastal waters much longer than airplanes. The bases were also called Naval Lighter-than-Air Bases. The blimps (non-rigid airships) were built by Goodyear Aircraft Company of Akron, Ohio. The blimps were powered by two aircraft radial air-cooled engines, the crew worked and on long patrols lived in a car under the envelope. The Navy's anti-submarine warfare operation operated in both the Atlantic and Pacific Ocean. To protect the blimps from strong winds and thunderstorms on the ground most bases had one or more larger airship hangars. Due to the shortage of steel during the war, many hangars were built out of wood.

== Blimps ==
=== World War I ===
World War I's first airship was the DN-1 which later came to be considered the A class Blimp. The B-class blimp, for which 20 were built for patrols during World War I. The C-class blimp, 10 were built near the end of World War I. Six D-class blimps were built in the 1920s, the last was retired in 1924. Only one E-class blimp was built in 1918 and retired in 1924. One F-class blimp was built in 1918 and retired in 1923.

=== World War II ===
The most common World War 2 coastal defense blimp used was the US Navy K-class blimp, with 133 built. The start of World War II blimps use was on September 23, 1935, when the US Navy purchased the airship Defender from Goodyear. Defender was Goodyear's largest advertising and passenger airships. Defender was delivered to NAS Lakehurst on October 5, 1935. Defender was used for crew training and give the Navy designation G-1, the first G-class blimp. Defender was lost in a midair collision with the smaller L-2 on June 8, 1942, during a night flight. Seven G-class blimps were built. The L-class blimp were smaller blimps use mostly for training, with 10 built. Five L-class blimp were civil blimps of Goodyear fleet: Resolute, Enterprise, Reliance, Rainbow, and Ranger. M-class blimps was the largest anti-submarine warfare blimp, four were built for use in Latin America bases. In addition to anti-submarine warfare, the blimps did assist with Search and rescue missions. US Navy blimps did over 37,000 patrols during World War II. Long patrols could be up to 26 hours in the air. The K-class blimp had a crew of 10 and had radar and Magnetic anomaly detector for sub hunting. Not used often but each blimp had up to four depth charges, naval mines or acoustic torpedoes and a .50-caliber machine gun

=== Post World War II ===
The N-class blimp was not retired till 1962, with 18 built. The M-class blimp was retired in 1956.

== United States blimp bases ==
Bases were built on both the East Coast and West Coast of the United States.

- Lakehurst Maxfield Field in Lakehurst, New Jersey, Six hangars, first built in 1921. Now part of part of Joint Base McGuire-Dix-Lakehurst
- Naval Air Station Weeksville, Elizabeth City, North Carolina, constructed in 1941. Also known as the TCOM Manufacturing. Also a production and test facility for airships and aerostats. Two hangars, one was destroyed by fire on August 3, 1995. Hangar No. 1 remains and is still used.
- NAS Santa Ana, Naval Lighter-than-Air Base, in Tustin, California, The two hangars were completed in July 1943. The south hangar is still standing on the former Marine Corps Air Station Tustin; the north hangar was destroyed by fire on November 7, 2023.
- Naval Air Station Moffett Field in Sunnyvale, California, both are still standing on NASA Ames Research Center, Hangar One
- Naval Air Station Tillamook in Tillamook, Oregon, Two hangars, Hangar A constructed in 1942, and Hangar B constructed in 1943. Both decommissioned in 1948. Fire destroyed Hangar A on August 22, 1992. Hangar B currently houses the Tillamook Air Museum.
- Naval Air Station Hitchcock, Hitchcock, Texas, one hangar commissioned on May 22, 1943, was damaged in 1961 by Hurricane Carla and demolished in 1962.
- NAS Houma, Houma, Louisiana, patrols in the Gulf of Mexico, one hangar commissioned on May 1, 1943; demolished in 1948.
- NAS Richmond, Miami, Florida, three hangars commissioned in 1942, at peak had 25 K-series blimps. One Hangar #2 door pillar is still standing at the Gold Coast Railroad Museum
- NAS Glynco, Brunswick, Georgia commissioned January 25, 1943, now Brunswick Golden Isles Airport, two hangars, both demolished in 1971.
- Naval Air Station South Weymouth, South Weymouth, Massachusetts, built in 1942. Two hangars, one wood one steel. Hangar 1, lost in 1966. Hangar 2 was demolished in 1953.
- (Scott Field in St. Clair County, Illinois, had a US Army Lighter-than-Air Base from 1921–1937 for training, including J-class blimps. In 1937, the Army Air Corps ended its airship program and transferred all its LTA material to the Navy, only two blimps were used by the Navy: TC-13 and TC-14)

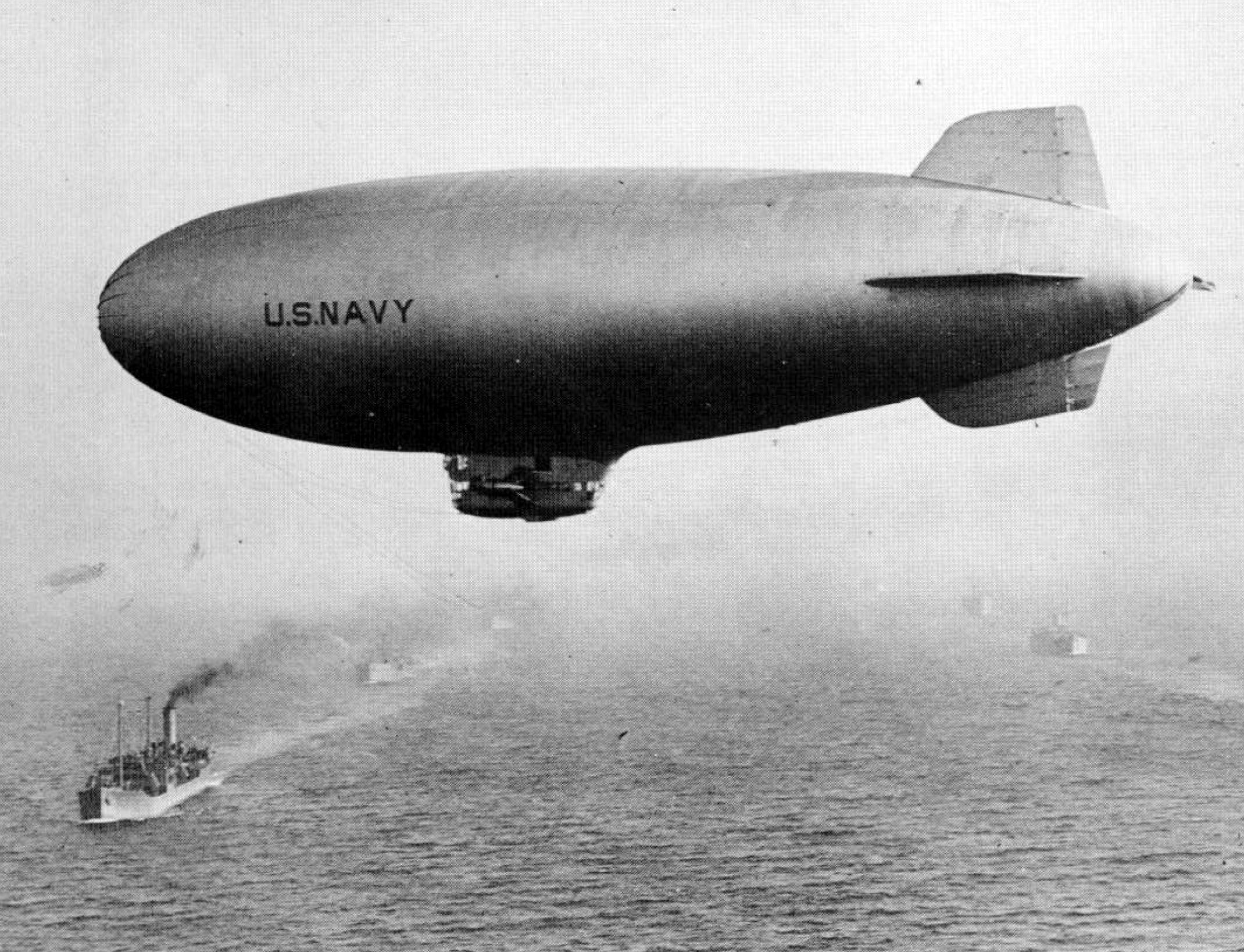
Navy blimp K-110 with Patrol Squadron ZP-42, escorting a convoy of merchant ships on Brazilian coast during World War 2

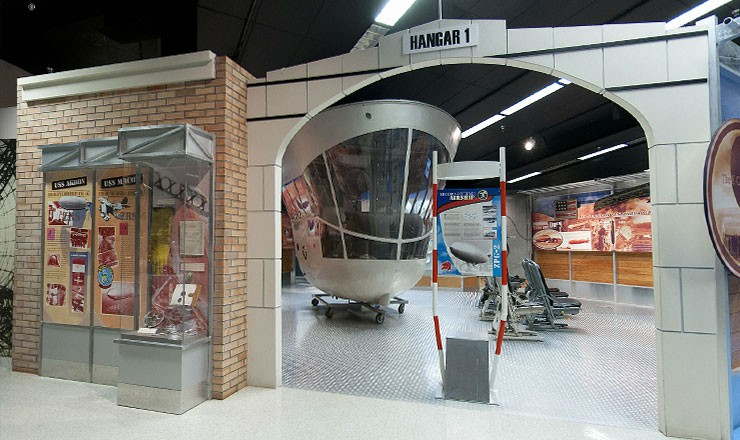
US Nav LTA (blimp) display at the National Naval Aviation Museum

== Oversea blimp bases ==
NAS Trinidad, also called NAS Port-of-Spain, was a large Naval base built during World War II to support the many naval ships fighting and patrolling the Battle of the Atlantic. The fighting in the area became known as the Battle of the Caribbean. Naval Base Trinidad was located on the Island of Trinidad in West Indies of the Caribbean Sea. NAS Trinidad had a blimp base and built and supported Latin America bases to protect the shipping lanes to and from the Panama Canal from U-boat attacks. All the Latin America base were closed after the war, some became civil airports. NAS Trinidad did not close till 1977.

- Naval Base Trinidad Carlsen Field became a US Navy lighter-than-air base in the fall of 1943.
- NAF British Guiana was in British Guiana. The Navy had blimps stationed at the Army air base at Atkinson Field, now Cheddi Jagan International Airport. The base was built by civilian workers. NAF British Guiana was 40 miles up the Essequibo River on a 1400-acres of land at 6.445493°N 58.609638°W.
- NAF Paramaribo and Zandery Field (Army and Navy) at Paramaribo (now Suriname), became Johan Adolf Pengel International Airport. A Paramaribo was a lighter-than-air blimp base, used for U-boat patrols, the base opened in August 1943 and closed in April 1946. FPO#404.
- NAF Fortaleza in Fortaleza Harbor, with Pici Field (on Sítio Pécy farm). The Naval base supported K-class blimp was used for patrol. Fortaleza Pici Field (Chapada do Pici) at location 3.766392°N 38.52199°W. Fleet Post Office (FPO) # was 90. Adjacent Field (Adjacento) at location 3.77667°N 38.540529°W.
- NAF Recif and NOF Recife at Recife, with Ibura Airfield that became Recife Airport. NAF Recife opened on October 1, 1943. One blimp was used for patrol. The large base was closed in November 1945. Location 8.122297°N 34.926906°W.
- NAF Amapá, on the Mapiá Grande River, had two blimps. Base started on September 22, 1942. Location 1.389334°N 49.981445°W. NAF Amapá was closed June 30, 1945.
- NAF Maceio, in Maceió, Salvador. The base had two blimps. NAF Maceio was at location 9.636161°N 35.715472°W.
- NAF Ipitanga at Ipitanga, Salvador, near Salvador, Bahia, Lauro de Freitas on the Ipitinga River and the Port of Aratu. Port and blimps air base, became Salvador Bahia Airport. NAF Ipitanga was at location 12.914635°N 38.308094°W.
- NAF Caravellas, at Caravellas opened in January 1944 and closed August 1, 1945. NAF Caravellas had two blimps. NAF Caravellas was at location 17.733782°N 39.264946°W.

== National Naval Aviation Museum ==
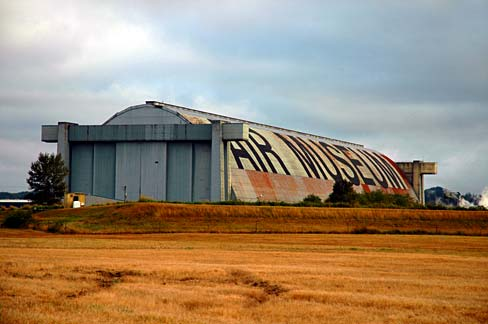
Tillamook Air Museum, the only NAS blimp hangar open to the public daily

The National Naval Aviation Museum, at Naval Air Station Pensacola, Florida, has a permanent Lighter-than-Air (LTA) exhibit, with display on the history of US Navy Lighter-than-Air Aircraft. The L-8 airship control car is on display at the museum. Airship L-8 crashed after its crew, for some unknown reason, departed the airship on 16 August 1942 off the coast of San Francisco, California. Two N-class blimp control cars are on display at the Museum. The K-47 Control car on static display at the Museum.

== Tillamook Air Museum ==
The Tillamook Air Museum is the only NAS blimp hangar open to the public daily. Hangar B is used as an indoor aircraft and World War 2 Museum. NAS Tillamook was home Squadron ZP-33, which had eight K-Class airships. Tillamook Air Museum opened in 1994 in Tillamook, Oregon. The hangar is over 7 acres and is made of over 3.2 million board feet of Pacific Northwest lumber.

== Gallery ==
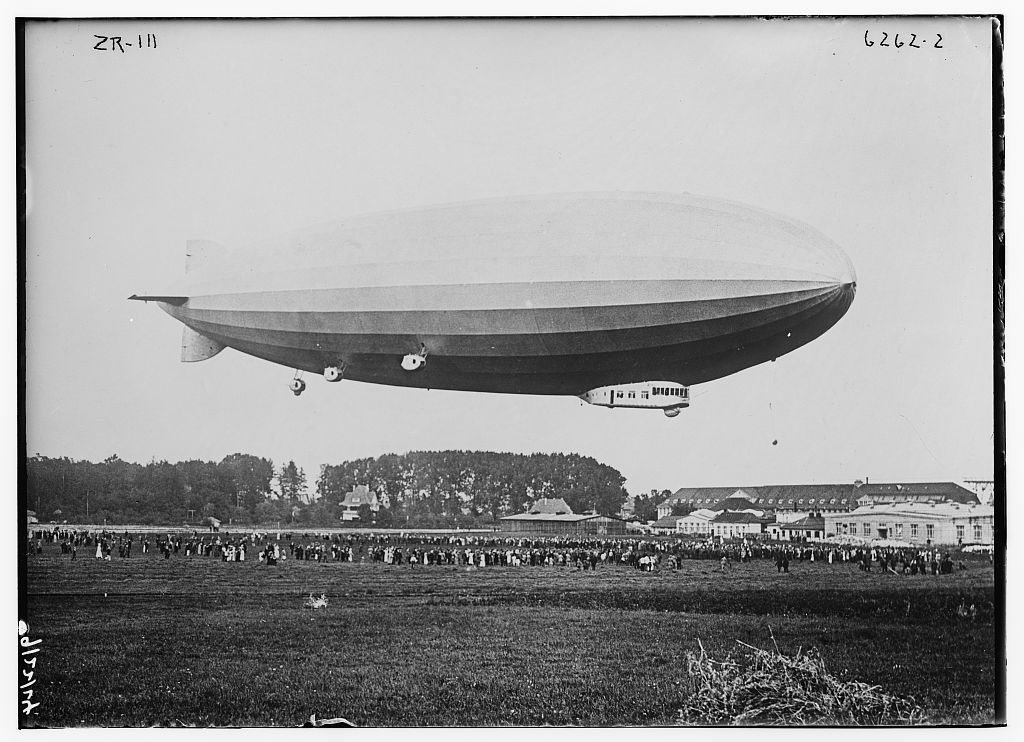
Naval Air Engineering Lakehurst Maxfield Field and ZR-3 in September 1924

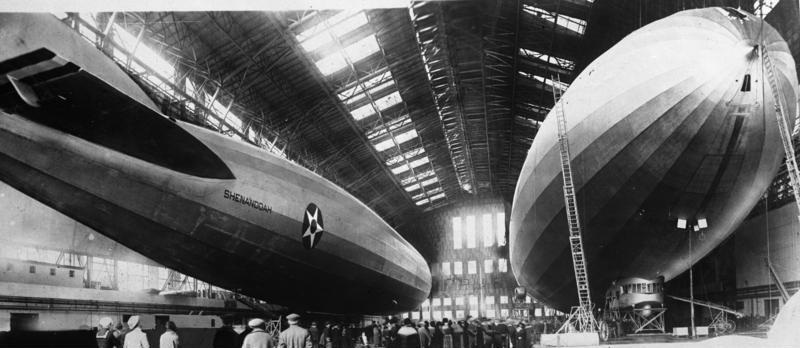
Lakehurst with ZR-3 und ZR-1

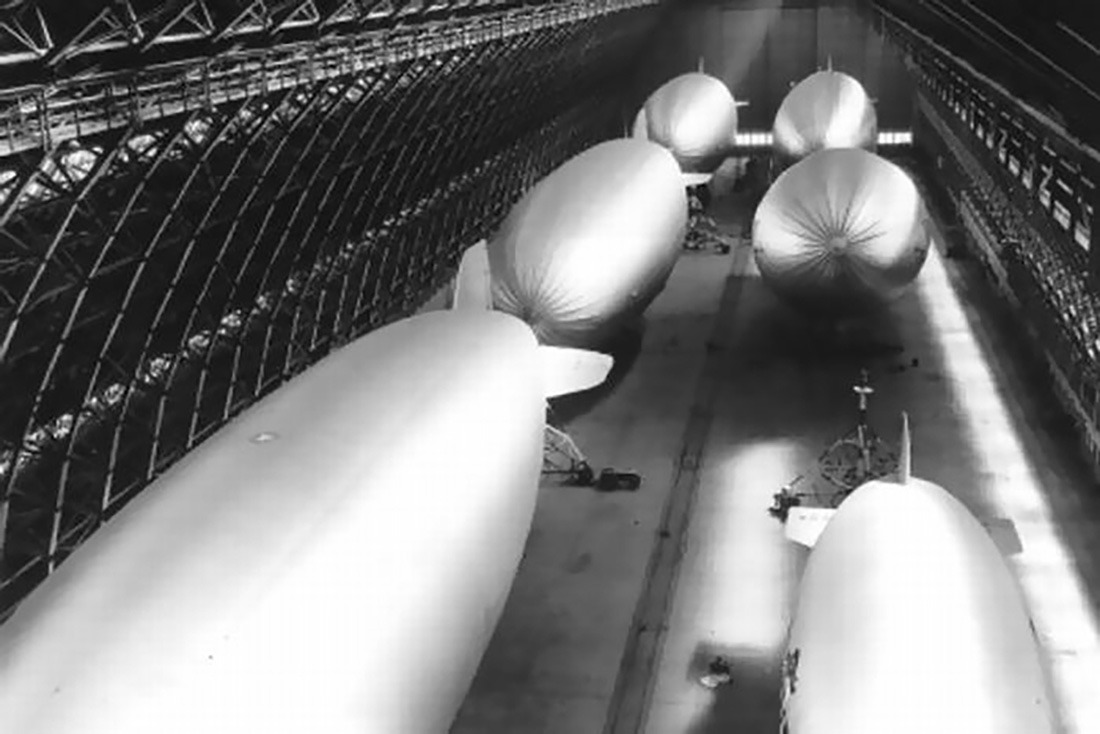
A view of six US Navy blimps in one of the two hangars located at NAS Santa Ana

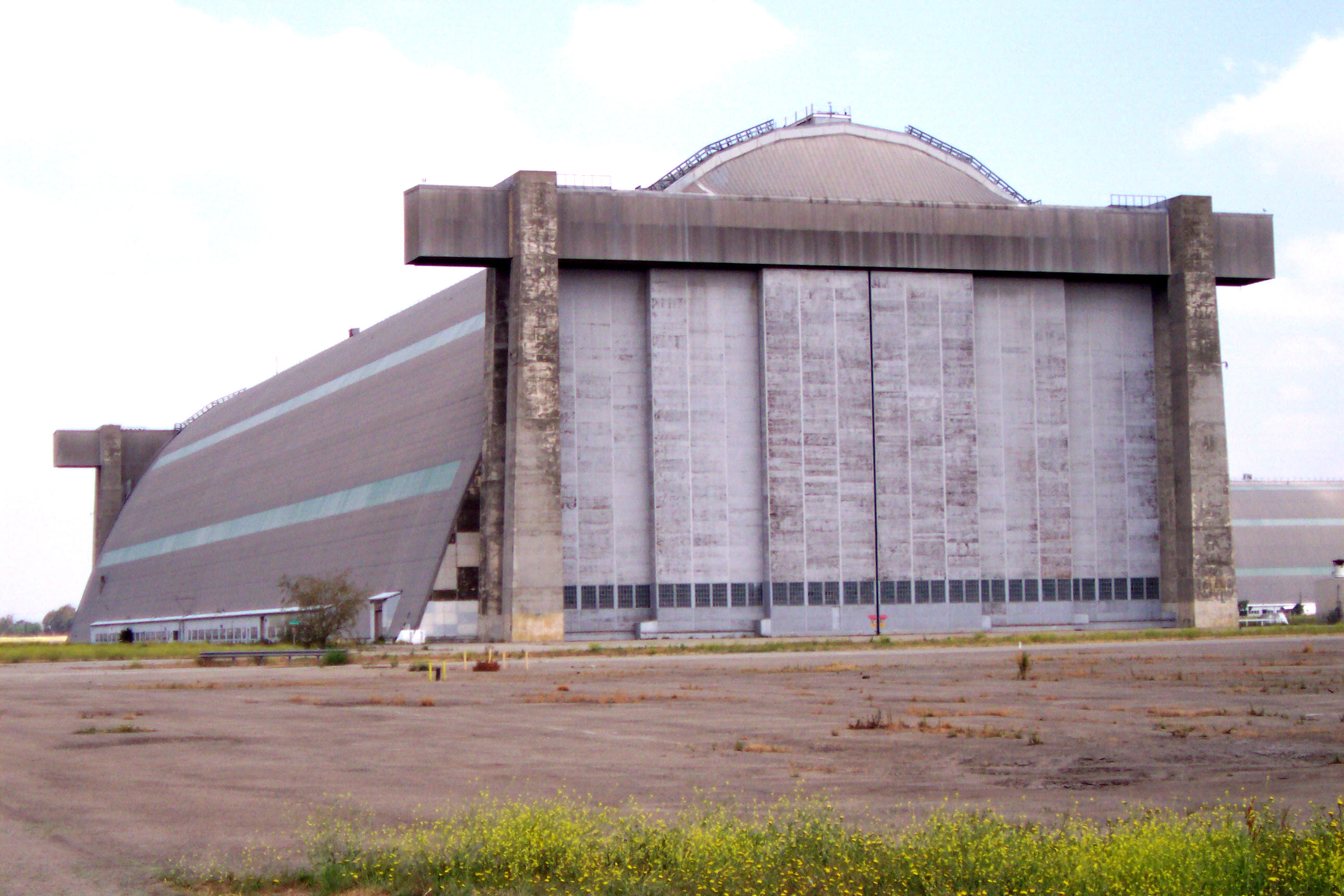
Hangar No. 2 (South Hangar) at the former Marine Corps Air Station in Tustin, California measures 1,072 feet (327 m) long by 292 feet (89 m) wide by 192 feet (59 m) tall. It and its sister structure (partially visible to the right) are listed on the National Register of Historic Places

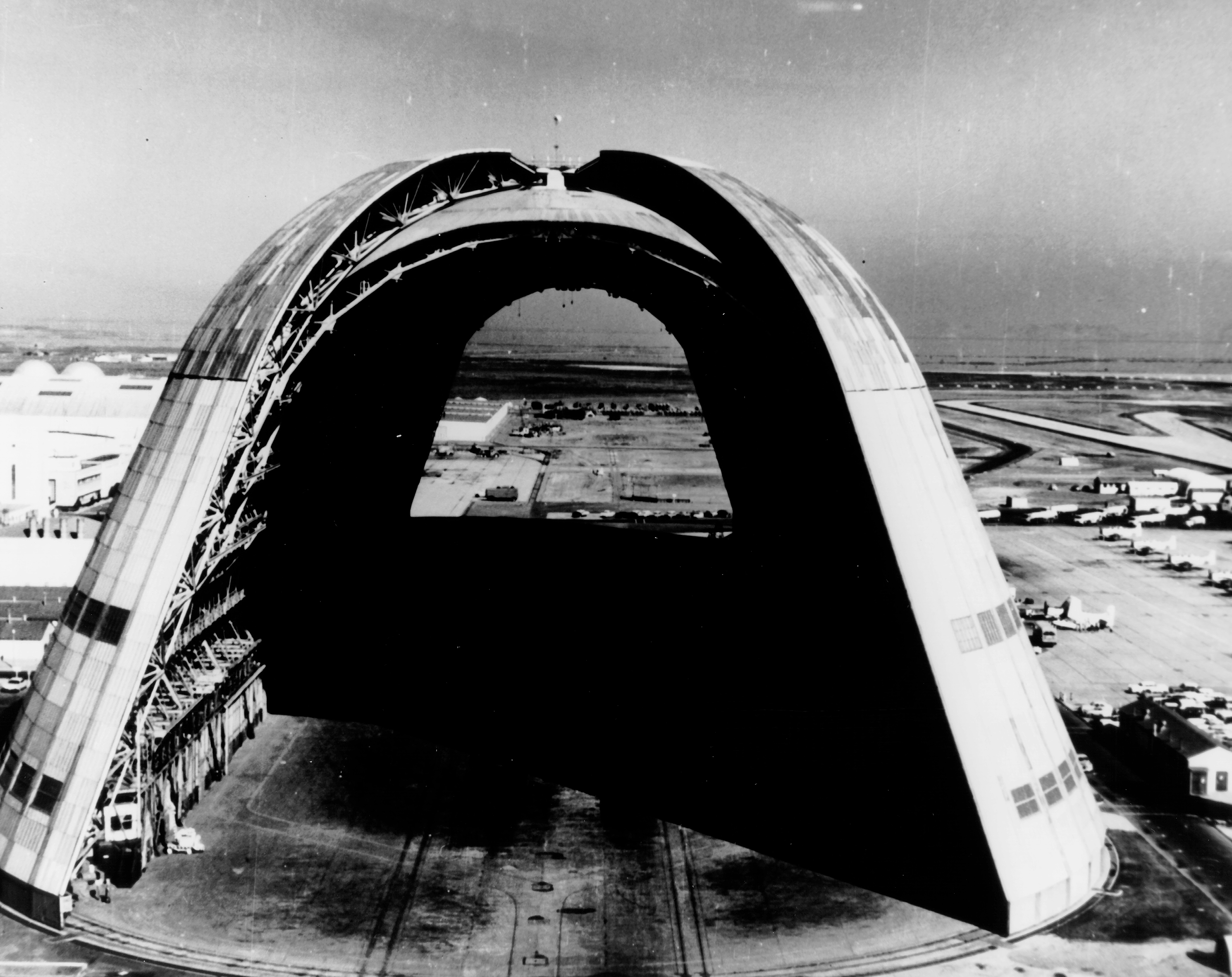
Moffett Field 1963, Hangar One with doors open at both ends

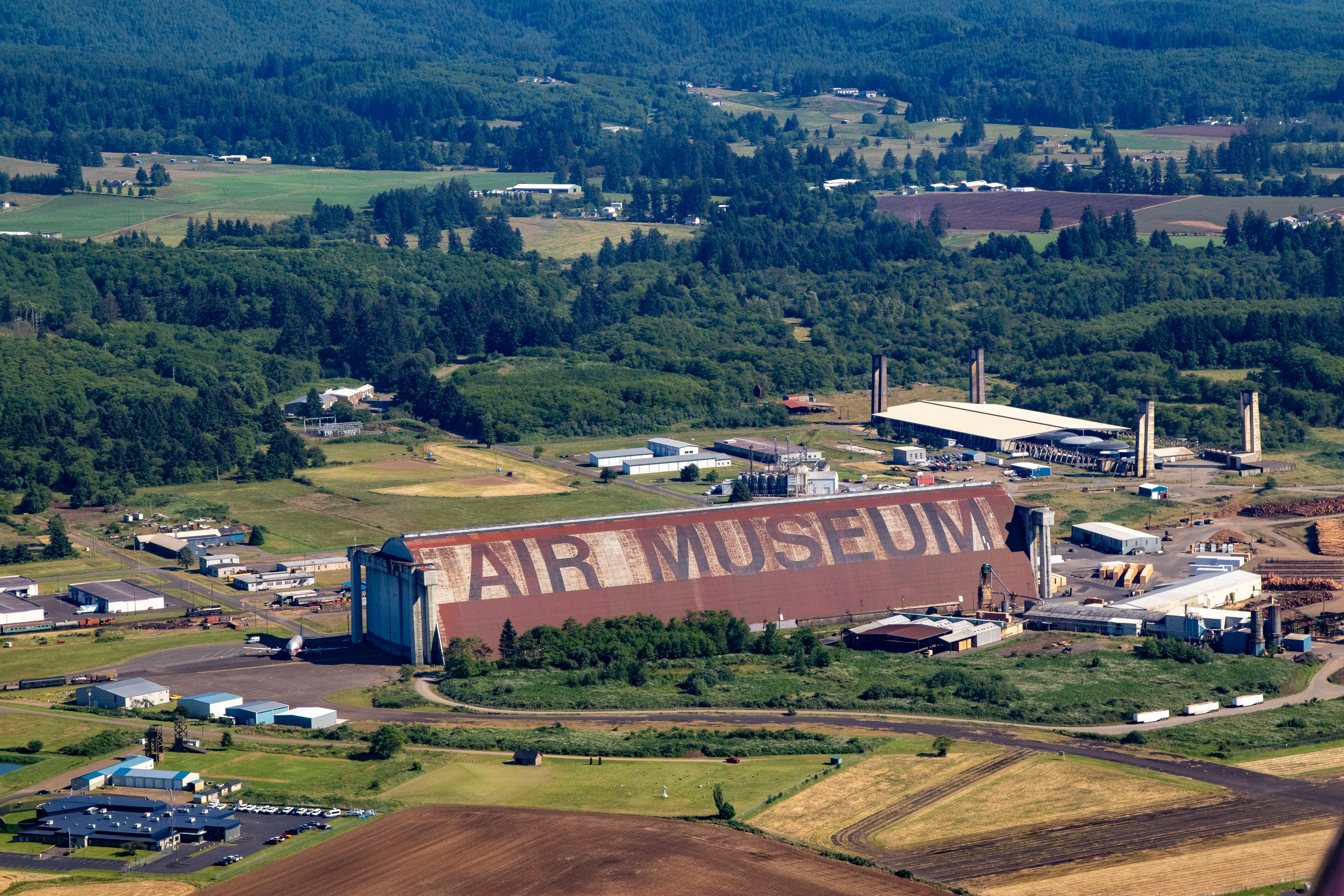
Tillamook Air Museum

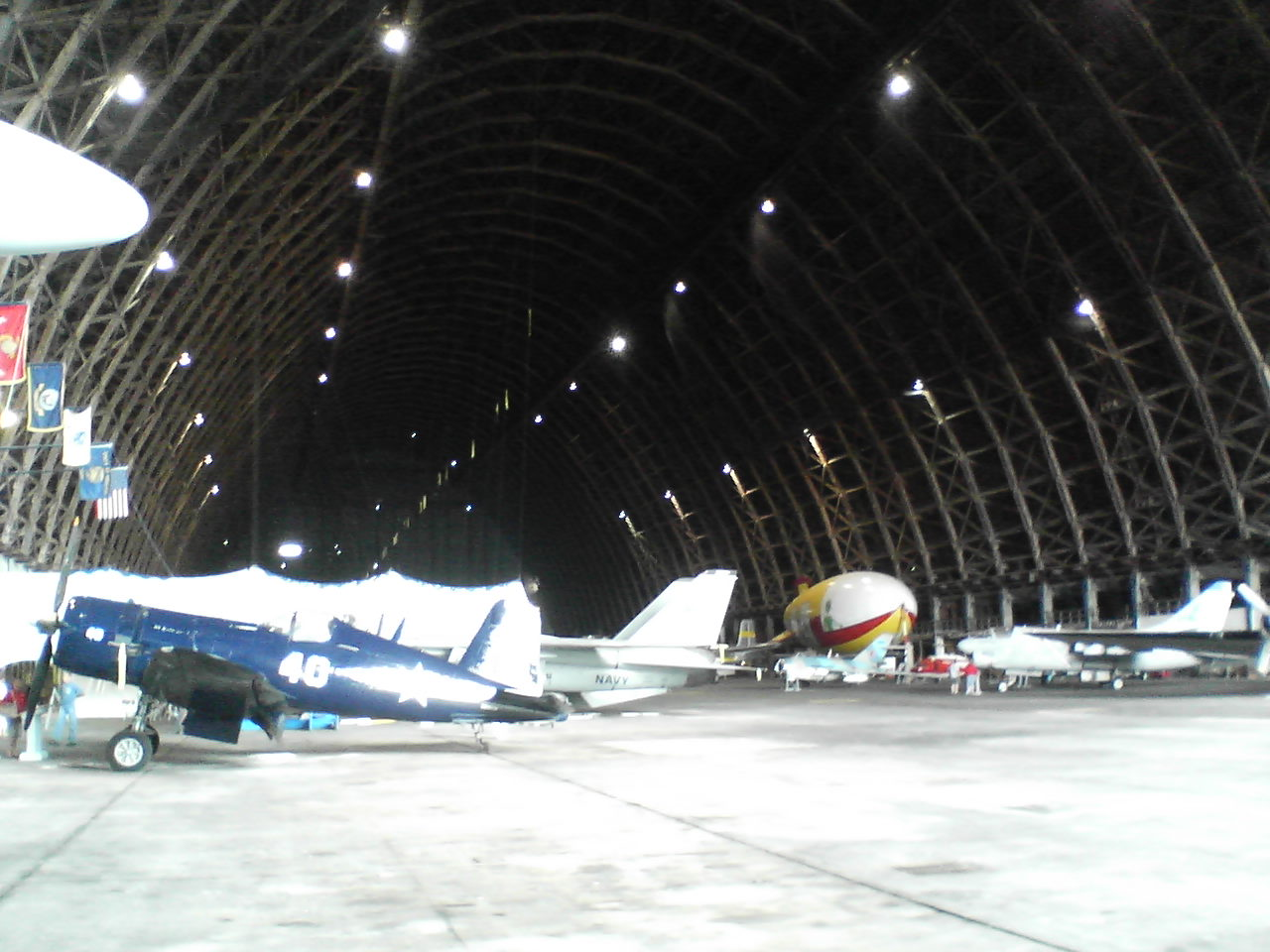
Tillamook Air Museum

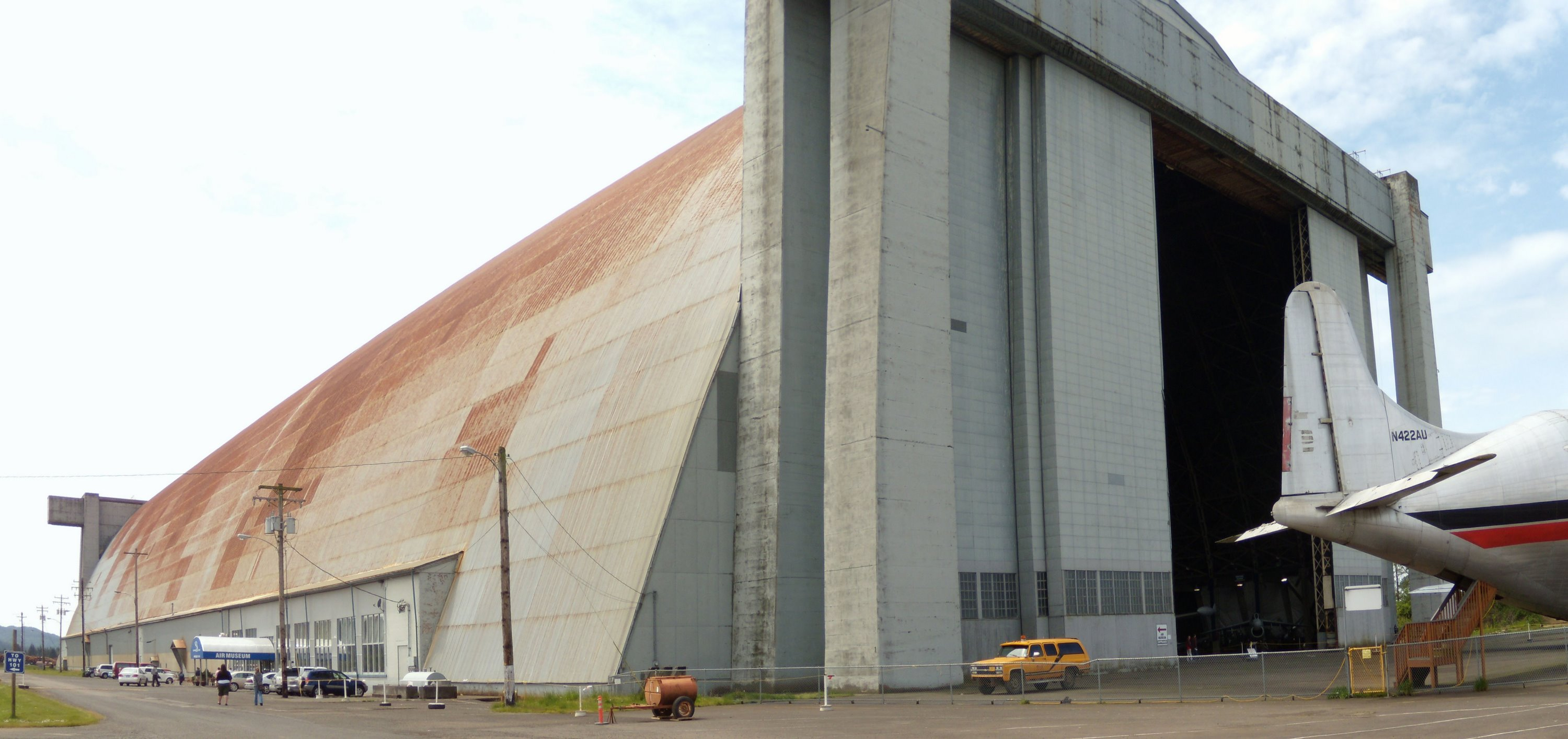
Hangar B, Tillamook Air Museum

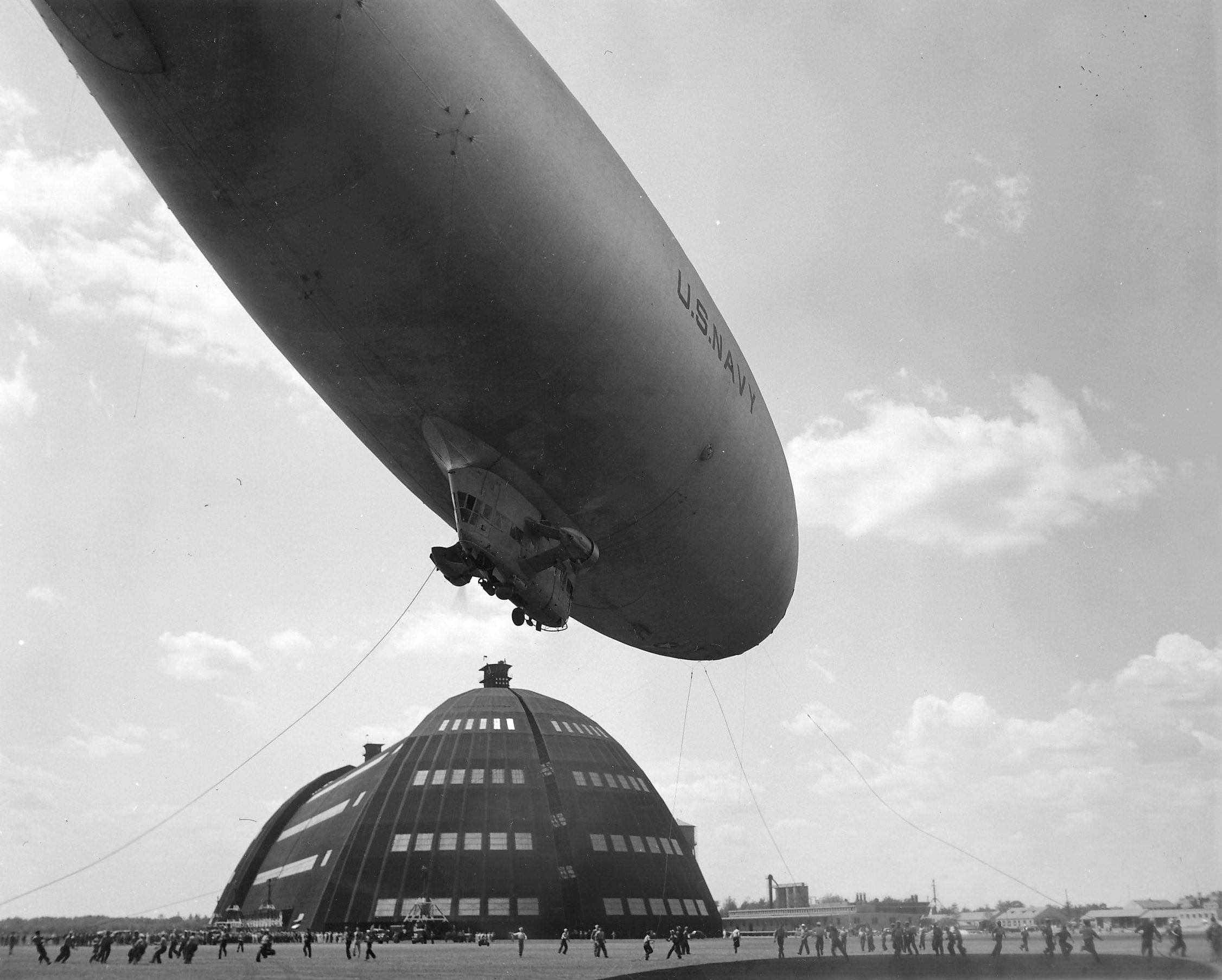
US Navy blimp K-38 making emergency landing at NAS South Weymouth in 1943

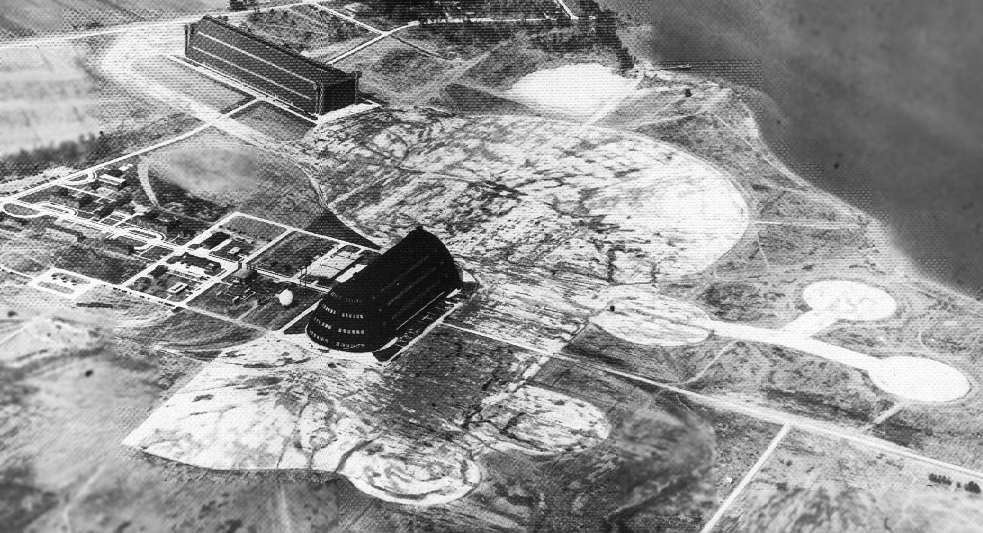
NAS Weeksville in 1944

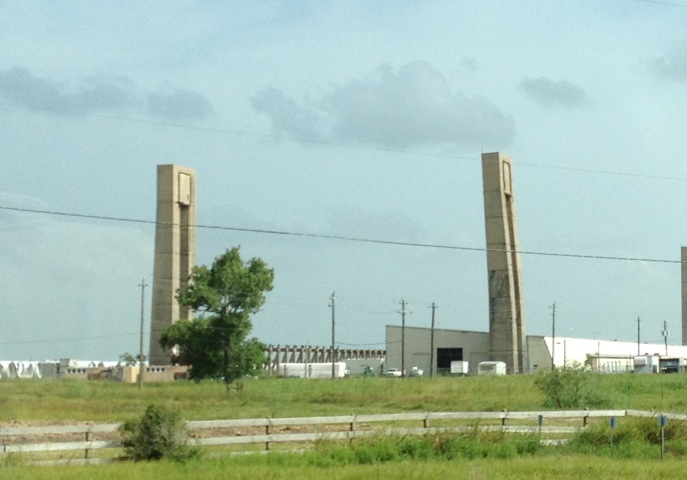
Hitchcock Naval Air Station Blimp Hangar Frame

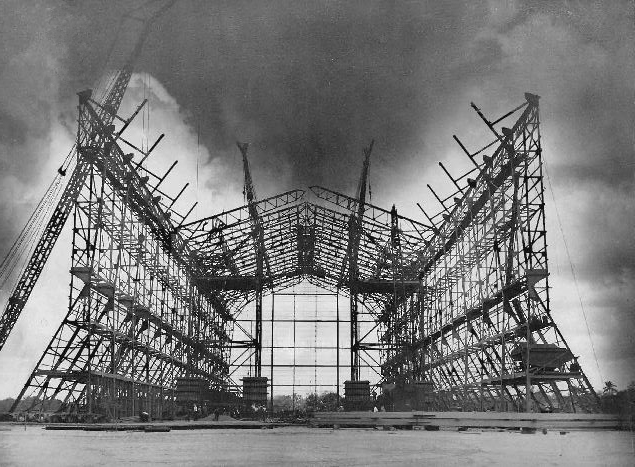
African American Seabees of the 80th Seabees erecting an Airship Hangar at Carlsen Field Trinidad

== See also ==
- Aircraft Warning Service
- Naval air station
- Steven F. Udvar-Hazy Center with L-5 – Control car on static display
- New England Air Museum with K-28 - Goodyear Puritan Control car on static display
- US Navy airships during World War II
- Blimp K-74 only blimp lost in action

Related lists

- List of airships of the United States Navy
