= ZNN =

ZNN may refer to:

- ZENN Motor Company of Canada (TSX Venture Exchange symbol: ZNN)
- Ziwe News Network, a satirical news show by Ziwe Fumudoh
- .zNN, a file extension used for certain zipped files
- ZNN-G, ZNN-J, or ZNN-L, hull classifications for airships of the U.S. Navy
