= Naval Air Station Weeksville =

Airship manufacturing, storage, and test facility

Coordinates: 36°13′44″N 76°08′06″W

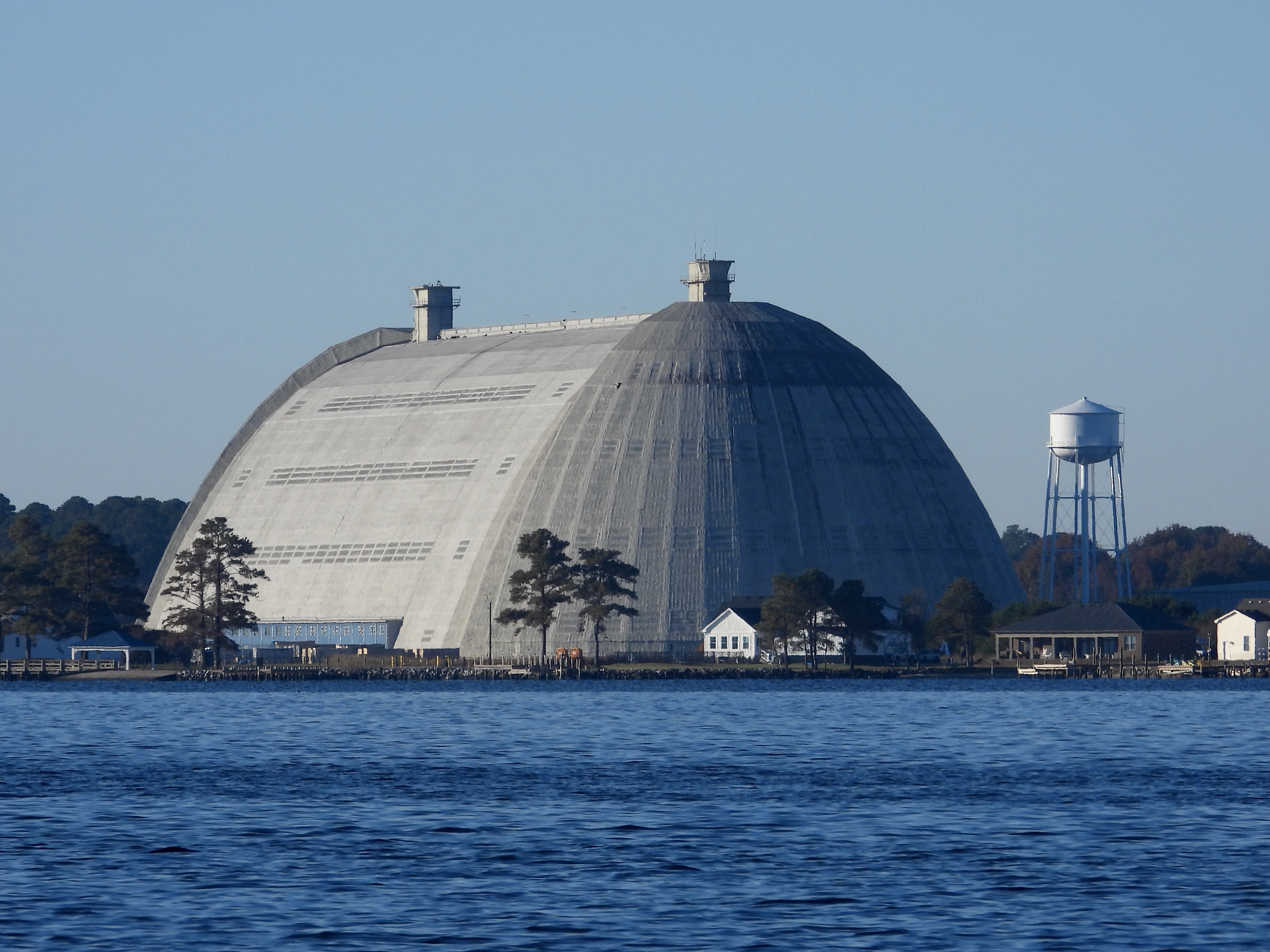
The surviving steel hangar in 2025

The Weeksville Dirigible Hangar (former Naval Air Station Weeksville) is an airship manufacturing, storage and test facility originally built by the United States Navy in 1941 for servicing airships conducting anti-submarine patrols of the US coast and harbors. It is located on the former Naval Air Station Weeksville in Elizabeth City, North Carolina, approximately 2 miles southeast of the present day Coast Guard Air Station Elizabeth City.

== Background ==
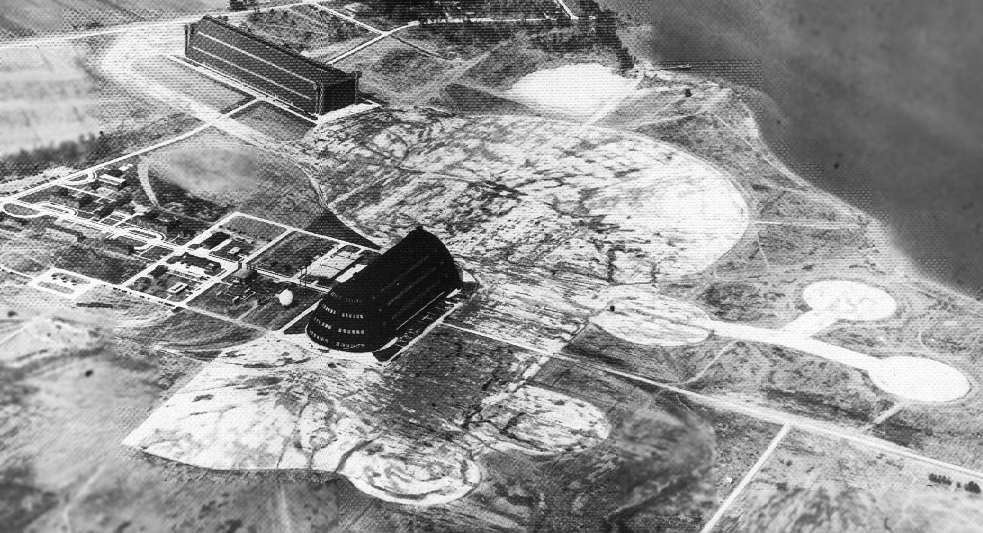
A north-facing aerial view of the Naval Air Station Weeksville in 1944, showing the steel LTA hangar (center) and timber LTA hangar (top left).

At the beginning of World War II, Naval Air Station Lakehurst, established in 1921, was the only active lighter-than-air (LTA) naval air station operated by the US Navy. In 1940, the US Navy proposed to the US Congress the development of a lighter-than-air station program for anti-submarine patrols of the coast and harbors. This program proposed, in addition to the expansion at Lakehurst and the reestablishment of Naval Air Station Moffett Field as a naval LTA station, the construction of new stations in the Boston, Cape May, Cape Hatteras, southern Florida, southern Georgia, Louisiana, Los Angeles, San Francisco, Puget Sound, and Hitchcock near Galveston, Texas areas. The original contract included a steel hangar, 960 feet (290 m) long, 328 feet (100 m) wide and 190 feet (58 m) high, helium storage and service, barracks for 228 men, a power plant, landing mat, and a mobile mooring mast. In June 1941, shortly before Congress completed action on the Navy's proposed LTA program, work began at NAS Lakehurst on a project which included the construction of two airship hangars.

The Second Deficiency Appropriation Bill for 1941, passed July 3, 1941, authorized the construction of 8 facilities to accommodate a total of 48 airships, as requested in 1940. Due to steel rations, a total of 17 large wooden hangars were built among 10 LTA bases.

As finally developed in 1943, LTA facilities (with wooden hangars built) in addition to NAS Lakehurst (2) and NAS Moffett Field (2), included NAS South Weymouth (1), NAS Weeksville (1), NAS Glynco (2), NAS Richmond (3), NAS Houma (1), NAS Hitchcock (1), NAS Santa Ana (2) and NAS Tillamook (2). In the initial program, accommodations were provided for six airships at each station. This was later increased to twelve at seven of the stations and to eighteen at NAS Richmond as a result of an increase in the authorized strength to 200 airships.

== Description ==
In September 1941, work started on what was to become the NAS South Weymouth. The pattern of projects there was followed, with little modification, at the seven new stations during the ensuing year. The construction of the Weeksville hangar, which aimed to serve the Cape Hatteras area, followed and works started in October 1941. These two stations were the only new ones begun before the December 1941 attack on Pearl Harbor.

The US Navy started the construction of the Weeksville LTA air station on August 6, 1941, which lasted until 1942. It is the only remaining steel airship hangar built during World War II and is based on the Goodyear Airdock in Akron Ohio designed by Karl Arnstein. Due to steel rations, an additional hangar was built out of wood, which would in following decades become known as the world's largest wooden structure before its destruction by fire in 1995.

NAS Weeksville was operational from 1941 to 1957. NAS Weeksville's airships played a vital role in German U-boat spotting during World War II, helping to minimize losses to East Coast shipping. However, budget cuts to the Navy's LTA program in the mid-1950s resulted in the closure of NAS Weeksville as an active naval installation in 1957. In 1959 the facility was used for design testing of communications satellites as part of NASA's Project Echo.

On August 3, 1995, a welder's torch started a fire in the wooden hangar. Response from numerous area fire departments was swift but all attempts to control the blaze were unsuccessful due to the hangar's southern yellow pine construction and massive size. The wooden hangar was engulfed, and burned to the ground.

The remaining steel hangar was used by several manufacturing firms following the base's decommissioning in 1957, including Westinghouse and IXL Cabinetry. In 1986, an aerostat manufacturing company, TCOM Corporation, relocated to Elizabeth City, conducting temporary operations in a former Kmart while the hangar was refurbished and eventually returned to active service once again as a manufacturing and test facility. Today, TCOM is corporately head-quartered in Columbia, Maryland, while the former NAS Weeksville site is now known as the TCOM Manufacturing, Production and Test Facility for airships and aerostats and an active airfield for lighter-than-air aircraft operations.

== See also ==
- Hangar No. 1, Lakehurst Naval Air Station
- Hangar One (Mountain View, California)
- Goodyear Airdock
- Bartolomeu de Gusmão Airport
- Navy Air Stations Blimps bases

== Bibliography ==
- Bureau of Yards and Docks, US Navy (1947). Building the Navy's Bases in World War II; History of the Bureau of Yards and Docks and the Civil Engineer Corps, 1940-1946. Washington, D.C.: U.S. Government Printing Office. OCLC 568748097. (Public domain)
