= ZP =

ZP may refer to:

== Mathematics and science ==
- Z_{p}, the ring of p-adic integers
- Zona pellucida (or egg coat), a glycoprotein layer around an oocyte
- Z/pZ, the cyclic group of integers modulo p

== Organisations ==
- Zila Parishad (lit. 'district council'):
  - District Councils of Bangladesh
  - District Councils of India
- Zjednoczona Prawica, the Polish United Right party
- ZP, US Navy prefix for airship patrol squadrons, 1942–1961
- Zafer Partisi (Victory Party), an anti-immigrant political party in Turkey

== People ==
- Zach Parise, American ice hockey player
- ZP Theart, former vocalist for British power metal band DragonForce
- José Luis Rodríguez Zapatero, former Spanish prime minister, via popular nickname "ZP" (Zapatero Presidente)
