= US Navy airships during World War II =

The United States Navy proposed to the U.S. Congress the development of a lighter-than-air station program for anti-submarine patrolling of the coast and harbors. This program proposed, in addition to the expansion at Naval Air Station and Lakehurst, the construction of new stations. The original contract was for steel hangars, 960 ft (290 m) long, 328 ft (100 m) wide and 190 ft (58 m) high, helium storage and service, barracks for 228 men, a power plant, landing mat, and a mobile mooring mast.

The Second Deficiency Appropriation Bill for 1941 passed in July 1941, changing the authorization to the construction of eight facilities to accommodate a total of 48 airships (as requested in 1940). Some of these new hangars were built at Lakehurst, Moffett, Weymouth and Weeksville; bases which already had metal hangars.

== Airship Force expansion ==
At the time of the Japanese attack on Pearl Harbor on December 7, 1941, which brought the United States into World War II, the US had 10 nonrigid airships:

- Combat & Patrol Ships
  - 2 TC-class blimps: older patrol ships built in 1933 for the US Army's airship operations. The US Navy had acquired TC-13 and TC-14 from the United States Army in 1938.
  - 4 K-class blimps: K-2, K-3, K-4 and K-5 designed as patrol ships and built from 1938.
- Training Ships
  - 3 L-class blimps: L-1, L-2 and L-3, produced as small training ships from 1938.
  - 1 G-class blimp: built in 1936 for training.

The TC and K class blimps were quickly pressed into service against Japanese and German submarines which were then sinking American shipping within visual range of the American coast. On 2 January 1942 the US Navy formed the ZP-12 patrol unit based in Lakehurst from the four K airships. A month later, the ZP-32 patrol unit was formed at Naval Air Station Moffett Field in Sunnyvale, California from two TC and two L airships. An airship training base was also created at Moffett Field.

The US Navy command, remembering the airship anti-submarine success from World War I, immediately requested new modern anti-submarine airships.

Plans for standardized wooden hangars were drawn up by the Navy Department Bureau of Yards and Docks with Arsham Amirikian acting as principal engineer. These were 1,075 ft (328 m) long, 297 ft (91 m) wide and 171 ft (52 m) high. Seventeen of these wooden hangars were completed by the Navy Department Bureau of Yards and Docks in 1943.

== Airship production ==
Airships were produced by the Goodyear factory in Akron, Ohio and also assembled at Moffett Field in California.

From 1942 until 1945, 154 airships were built for the U.S. Navy

- 133 K-class blimps
- 10 L-class blimps
- 7 G-class blimps
- 4 M-class blimps

As well as planned and new construction, some of Goodyear's civilian airships were turned over to the Navy: the Resolute, Enterprise, Reliance, Rainbow, and Ranger becoming L-4 through to L-8. In some cases the airships began observation patrols before being officially commissioned and the crews being sworn in, leading them to be described as "privateers" in some media.

== Personnel ==
From 1942 to 1944, airship military personnel grew from 430 to 12,400 and approximately 1,400 airship pilots and 3,000 support crew were formally trained in the military airship crew training programs.

== Fleet Airship wings (FASW) ==
Fleet Airship Wings were first created as Airship Patrol Groups (APG) beginning in January 1942. The Fleet Airship Wing (FASW) designation first appeared on 1 Dec 1942 with FASW 30 and 31 which were placed organizationally above the APGs. On 15 July 1943 FASW 30 and 31 were redesignated "Fleet Airships Atlantic" (FASL) and "Fleet Airships Pacific" (FASP) and the Airship Patrol Groups (APG) under them were redesignated Fleet Airship Wings (FASW). The five FASWs which operated during WWII were all disestablished by January 1946.

=== Fleet Airship Wing One ===
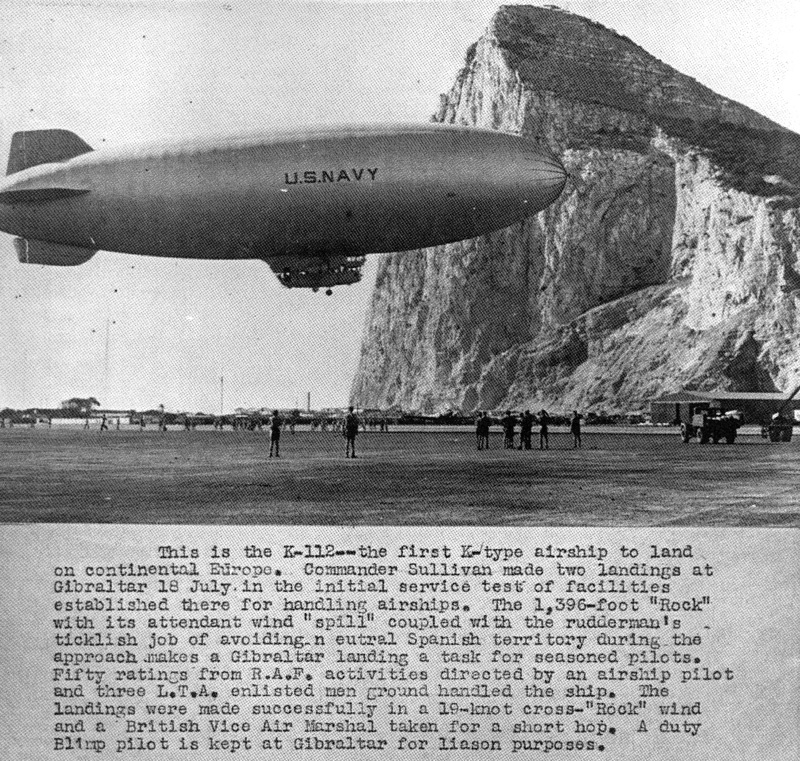
K-class blimps of USN Blimp Squadron ZP-14 conducted anti-submarine warfare operations at the Strait of Gibraltar in 1944–45.

Headquarters

Naval Air Station Lakehurst, New Jersey

Squadrons
in 1942 when the navy began establishing squadrons they were called "Airship Squadron" (designated ZP) for example: Airship Squadron Twelve (ZP-12). On 15 July 1945 "Airship Squadrons" were renamed "Blimp Squadrons" keeping the same ZP designation: Blimp Squadron Twelve (ZP-12)

ZP-12 was established on 2 Jan 1942 from the four K airships. It was based in Lakehurst.

- ZP-12 at Naval Air Station Lakehurst
- ZP-15 at Naval Air Station Glynco
- ZP-14 at Naval Air Station Weeksville
- ZP-11 at Naval Air Station South Weymouth

Auxiliary Fields

Naval Air Station Brunswick, Bar Harbor, Maine, Yarmouth, Nova Scotia, and Argentia, Newfoundland.

Operations

- 1944

The first two K-class blimps (K-123 & K-130) left Naval Air Station South Weymouth on 28 May, flying to Argentia, Newfoundland, the Azores, and finally to Port Lyautey They completed the first transatlantic crossing by nonrigid airships on 1 June.

- 1944-45

An entire squadron of eight Goodyear K-class blimps (K-123, K-130, K-109, K-134, K-101, K-112, K-89, & K-114) with flight and maintenance crews was moved from Weeksville Naval Air Station in North Carolina to Naval Air Station Port Lyautey, French Morocco. Their mission was to locate and destroy German U-boats in the relatively shallow waters around the Strait of Gibraltar where magnetic anomaly detection (MAD) was viable. Consolidated PBY Catalina aircraft had been searching these waters but MAD required low altitude flying that was dangerous at night for these aircraft. The blimps were considered a perfect solution to establish a round-the-clock MAD barrier (fence) at the Straits of Gibraltar with the PBYs flying the day shift and the blimps flying the night shift.

- 1945

ZP-14 operating in the Mediterranean area from June 1944 completely denied the use of the Gibraltar Straits to Axis submarines. Airships from ZP-12 took part in the sinking of the last U-boat before German capitulation, sinking U-881 together with destroyers Atherton and Mobery. The blimps of ZP-14 (a.k.a. The Africa Squadron) also conducted mine-spotting and mine-sweeping operations in key Mediterranean ports and various escorts including the convoy carrying United States President Franklin D. Roosevelt and British Prime Minister Winston Churchill to the Yalta Conference in 1945.

=== Fleet Airship Wing Two ===
Headquarters

Naval Air Station Richmond, Florida covered the Caribbean, Gulf of Mexico

Squadrons

- ZP-21 at Naval Air Station Richmond
- ZP-22 at Naval Air Station Houma
- ZP-23 at Naval Air Station Hitchcock

Auxiliary Fields

Key West, Florida and Brownsville, Texas.

Operations

FASW 2 patrolled the northern Caribbean from San Julian, the Isle of Pines (now called Isla de la Juventud) and Guantanamo Bay, Cuba as well as Vernam Field, Jamaica.

=== Fleet Airship Wing Three ===
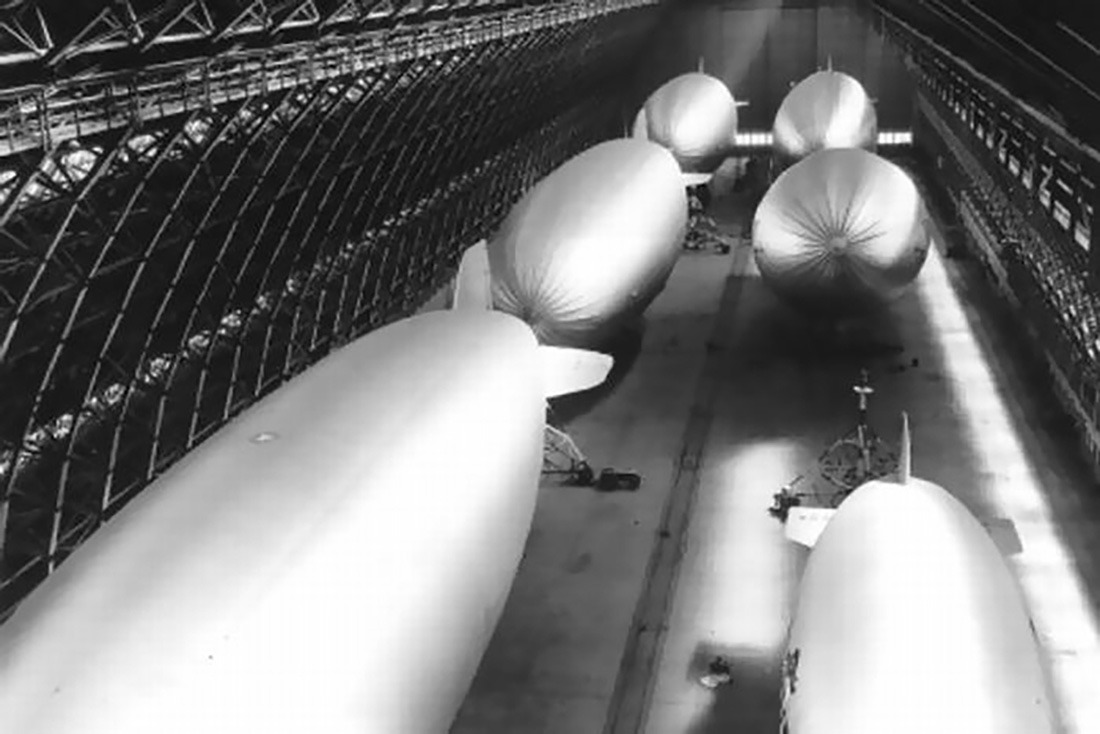
A view of six helium-filled blimps being stored in one of the two massive hangars located at Naval Air Station Santa Ana, during World War II.

Headquarters

Naval Air Station Moffett Field, California covered the west coast of the United States.

Squadrons

- ZP-32 at Naval Air Station Moffett Field
- ZP-31 at Naval Air Station Santa Ana
- ZP-33 at Naval Air Station Tillamook

ZP-32 was established at Naval Air Station Moffett Field in January 1942, initially without any blimps. It was formed from two TC-class blimps and two L-class blimps, based at Naval Air Station Moffett Field in February. Two TC-class blimps (TC-13 and TC-14) in storage deflated at Lakehurst, were shipped by rail, deflated, to NAS Moffett Field. These blimps were acquired by the Navy when the Army ended its lighter-than-air program in 1937.

Auxiliary Fields

Del Mar, Lompoc, Watsonville and Eureka, California, North Bend and Astoria, Oregon, as well as Shelton and Quillayute in Washington.

=== Fleet Airship Wing Four ===
Squadrons

- ZP-41 at Sao Luiz, Brazil
- ZP-42 at Maceió, Brazil

Auxiliary Fields

Amapá, Igarape Assu, Fortaleza, Fernando de Noronha, Recife, Ipitanaga Field, Caravellas, Vitoria, Santa Cruz, Rio de Janeiro from the hangar built for the Graf Zeppelin.

=== Fleet Airship Wing Five ===
ZP-51 at Trinidad with auxiliary fields at British Guiana and Paramaribo, Suriname.

== Summary of WWII airship operations ==
From 2 January 1942 till the end of war airship operations in the Atlantic, the airships of the Atlantic fleet made 37,554 flights and flew 378,237 hours.

During the war some 532 ships without airship escort were sunk near the US coast by enemy submarines. However; only one ship, the tanker Persephone, of the 89,000 ships or so protected in convoys escorted by blimps was sunk by the enemy. Airships engaged submarines with depth charges and, less frequently, with other on-board weapons. Airships were excellent at driving submarines down, where their limited speed and range prevented them from attacking convoys. The weapons available to airships were so limited that until the advent of the homing torpedo they had little chance of sinking a submarine.

Only one airship, a K-class airship from ZP-21, was destroyed by U-boat. On the night of 18/19 July 1943 K-74 was patrolling the coastline near Florida. Using radar, the airship located a surfaced German submarine. K-74 made her attack run but the U-boat opened fire first. K-74's depth charges did not release as she crossed the U-boat and K-74 received serious damage, losing gas pressure and an engine but landing in the water without loss of life. The crew was rescued by patrol boats in the morning, but one crewman, Aviation Machinist's Mate Second Class Isadore Stessel, died from a shark attack. The U-boat, U-134, was slightly damaged and the next day or so was attacked by aircraft, sustaining damage that forced it to return to base. It was finally sunk on 27 August 1943 in the Bay of Biscay by depth charges from the British frigate HMS Rother (K224)

== See also ==
- List of United States Navy aircraft wings
