= L-class blimp =

Class of non-rigid airships built by Goodyear Aircraft Company for the U.S. Navy (1930s)

L class
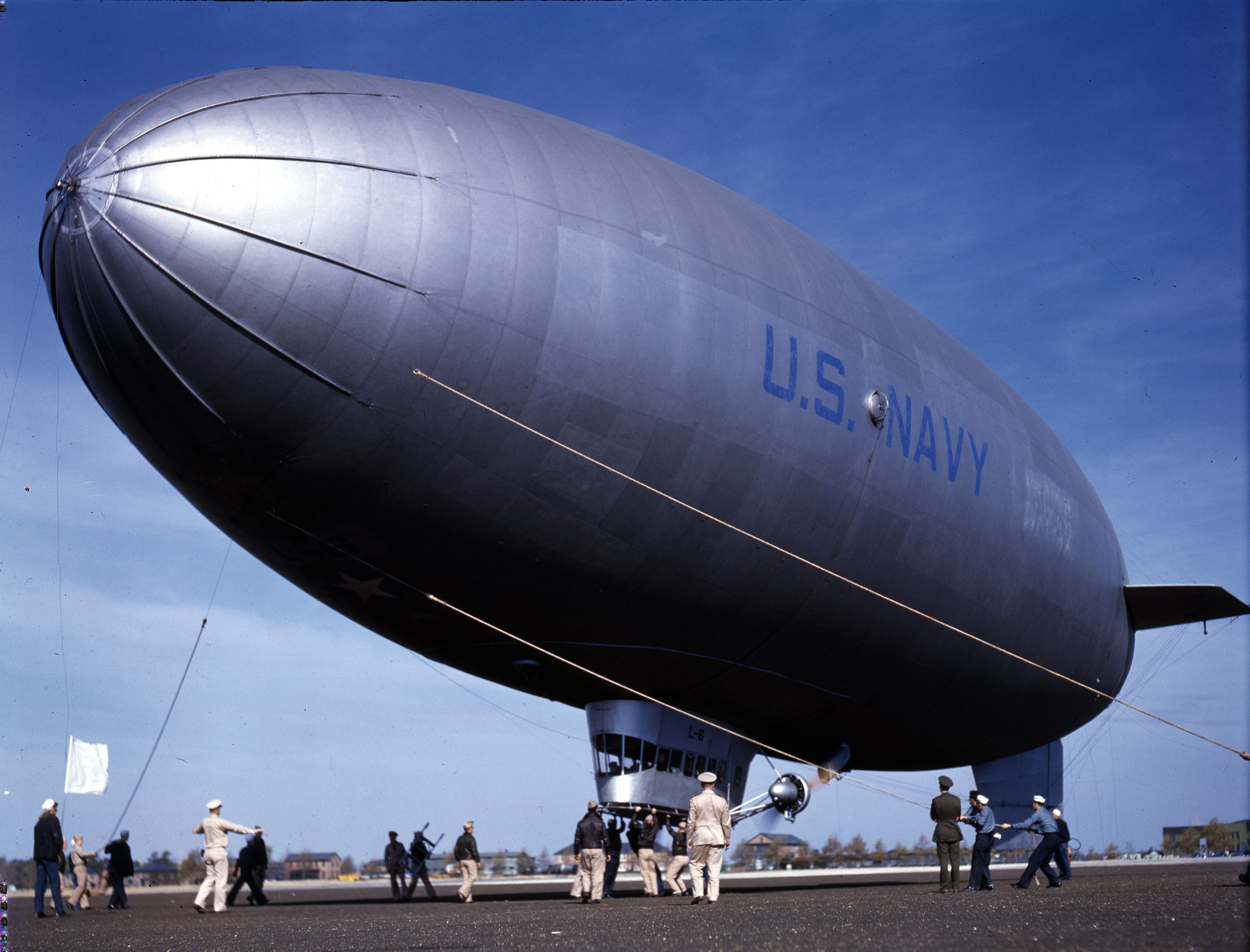
- L-6 at NAS Lakehurst Naval Air Station.

General information
- Type: Training airship
- Manufacturer: Goodyear-Zeppelin and Corporation and Goodyear Aircraft Corporation
- Primary user: US Navy
- Number built: 22

The L-class blimps were training airships operated by the United States Navy during World War II. In the mid-1930s, the Goodyear Aircraft Company built a family of small non-rigid airships that the company used for advertising the Goodyear name. In 1937 the United States Navy awarded a contract for two different airships, K-class blimp designated K-2 and a smaller blimp based upon Goodyear's smaller commercial model airship used for advertising and passenger carrying. The smaller blimp was designated by the Navy as L-1. It was delivered in April 1938 and operated from the Navy's lighter-than-air facility at Lakehurst, New Jersey. In the meantime, the Navy ordered two more L-Class blimps, the L-2 and L-3, on September 25, 1940. These were delivered in 1941. L-2 was lost in a nighttime mid-air collision with the G-1 on June 8, 1942.

When the United States entered World War II, the Navy took over the operation of Goodyear's five commercial blimps. These were the Resolute, Enterprise, Reliance, Rainbow, and Ranger. These airships were given the designations L-4 through L-8 even though their characteristics and performance varied among them. The next four L-Class airships were built in the assembly and repair shops at NAS Moffett Field. These blimps, L-9 through L-12 were completed by April 1943. The last lot of L-Class airships were ordered from Goodyear under a contract of February 24, 1943. This was a lot of ten airships designated L-13 through L-22. All the blimps were delivered by the end of 1943.

As training airships these blimps operated mainly from the two major lighter-than-air bases, Lakehurst and Moffett Field. While too small for any extensive operational use, they were used on some coastal patrols. In this role, L-8, of Blimp Squadron ZP-32 was involved in a mysterious incident wherein the airship came drifting in from the Pacific Ocean over southern San Francisco at Daly City on August 16, 1942, without either of the crewmen – Lt. E. D. Cody and Ensign C. Adams – on board. No trace of either man was ever found.

Following the end of World War II a number of the L-class blimps were sold back to Goodyear. The company repaired L-8 and renamed it America.

== Operators ==
United States

- United States Navy

== Surviving aircraft ==
- L-5 – Control car on static display at the Udvar-Hazy Center of the National Air and Space Museum in Chantilly, Virginia.
- L-8 – Control car on static display at the National Naval Aviation Museum in Pensacola, Florida.

== Specifications (L-4) ==
Data from

General characteristics

- Crew: 2
- Length: 147 ft 6 in (44.97 m)
- Diameter: 39 ft 10 in (12.14 m)
- Height: 34 ft 0 in (16.46 m)
- Volume: 123,000 cu ft (3,482 m^{3})
- Useful lift: 2,540 lb (1,152 kg)
- Powerplant: 2 × Warner R-500-2 radials , 145 hp (108 kW) each

Performance

- Maximum speed: 61 mph (96 km/h, 53 kn)
- Cruise speed: 46 mph (74 km/h, 40 kn)
- Range: 2,205 mi (3,537 km, 1,916 nmi)
- Endurance: 12 hours

== See also ==
Related lists

- List of airships of the United States Navy
- US Navy airships during World War II
- Navy Air Stations Blimps bases

== Sources ==
- Abbott, Patrick (November–December 1999). "L-8's Legacy: The Mary Celeste of the Skies". Air Enthusiast (84): 50–52. ISSN 0143-5450.
- Althoff, William F. (1990). Sky Ships. New York: Orion Books. ISBN 0-517-56904-3.
- Engelmann, Larry (July 1978) Close Encounter of Flight 101 American Legion Magazine
- Shock, James R. (2001). U.S. Navy Airships 1915–1962. Edgewater, Florida: Atlantis Productions. ISBN 0-9639743-8-6.
