= Naval Air Station Richmond =

Former U.S. Navy blimp base in Florida

Coordinates: 25.615752°N 80.39801°W

The Naval Lighter Than Air Station Richmond was a South Florida military installation about 18 miles (29 km) south of Miami and 3.5 miles (5.6 km) west of US 1. It was an active air base during World War II.

Since 1948, the University of Miami has used it as a research facility and storage area.

== History ==
In September 15, 1942, the U.S. Navy purchased 2,000 acres (810 ha); the base was used as a blimp base. Among the ten LTA bases across the nation, 17 large wooden hangars were built, of which Richmond NAS had more (3) than any other base.

On September 15, 1945, a hurricane caused a fire in one of the hangars. The fire quickly spread to the two other hangars and destroyed the hangars, blimps, 366 planes and 150 cars. The same type of wooden hangar can still be seen today at only four locations: (2) Moffett Field in California, (2) Tustin, California, (2) Lakehurst, NJ, and (1) Tillamook, Oregon.

In response to the sudden increase in enrollment resulting from veterans returning to college, the University of Miami leased the decommissioned station to provide classrooms and housing for 1,100 students as its "South Campus."

Buildings currently house: the Global Public Health Research Group, Miami Institute for Human Genomics, D.U.I. Laboratory (for analysis of motorist blood samples), and Microbiology & Immunology.

Starting in 1956 the railroad tracks on the base were used for the Gold Coast Railroad Museum. In 1984, the museum moved to the area previously occupied by Hangars #1 and #2.

In 1968, after Ramparts magazine exposed CIA operations on other campuses, JMWAVE was moved off the Miami South campus out of concern for embarrassing the university.

The command building currently houses the Miami Military Museum.

== See also ==
- Aircraft Warning Service
- Navy Air Station blimps bases
- US Navy airships during World War II

Related lists

- List of airships of the United States Navy
