= G-class blimp =

American non-rigid airship

G class
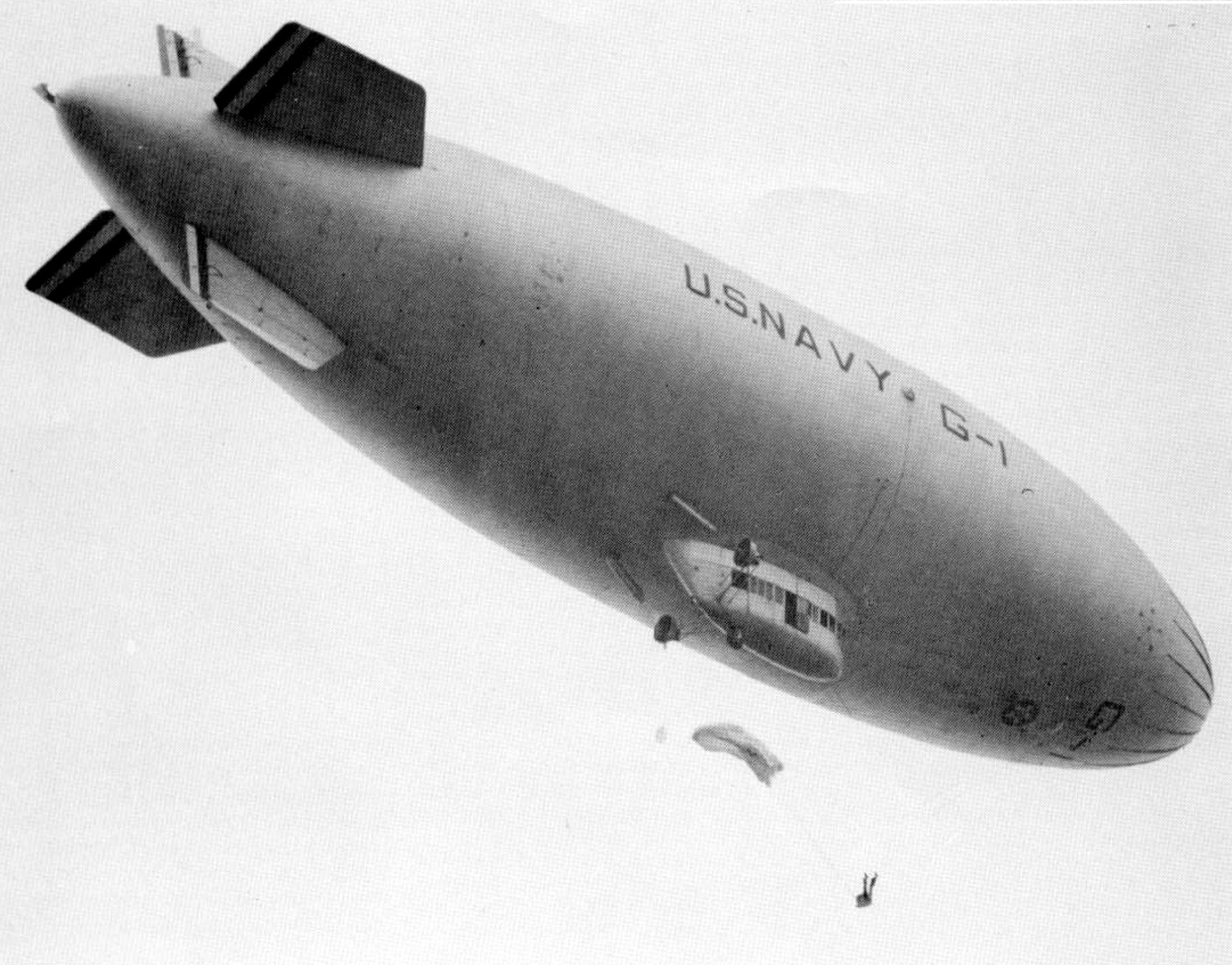
- NAVY G-1

General information
- Type: Training airship
- Manufacturer: Goodyear Aircraft Corporation
- Primary user: United States Navy
- Number built: 10

History
- Introduction date: 1935

The G-Class Blimps were a series of non-rigid airships (blimps) used by the United States Navy. In 1935, instead of developing a new design airship, the Navy purchased the Goodyear Blimp Defender for use as a trainer and utility airship assigning it the designator G-1. Defender was built by the Goodyear Aircraft Company of Akron, Ohio and was the largest blimp in the company’s fleet of airships that were used for advertising and as passenger airships. Goodyear built additional G-class airships for the Navy during World War II to support training needs.

== Operational history ==
After purchase on September 23, 1935, G-1 was in constant use until it was lost in a mid-air collision on 8 June 1942 with another blimp, the L-2. The two blimps were conducting experimental visual and photographic observations during night flight. Although twelve people were killed in the crash, G-1 had demonstrated her capabilities as a trainer and utility blimp. As the Navy needed additional training airships during the World War II war time build up, a contract was awarded on 24 December 1942 for seven more G-class airships. These were assigned the designation Goodyear ZNN-G. (Z = lighter-than-air; N = non-rigid; N = trainer; G = type/class). The envelope size of these new G-class blimps was increased over that of G-1 by 13,700 cu ft (390 m^{3}).

Airships G-2 through G-5 were delivered by late 1943 and G-6 through G-8 followed in early 1944. They were used for training mainly from the two major lighter-than-air bases, NAS Lakehurst and NAS Moffett Field on the southern edge of the San Francisco Bay.

== Operators ==
United States

- United States Navy

== Specifications (G-1) ==
General characteristics

- Crew: 2-3
- Capacity: 7-8
- Length: 186 ft 8 in (56.94 m)
- Diameter: 42 ft 10 in (13.06 m)
- Height: 62 ft 0 in (18.90 m)
- Volume: 183,000 cu ft (5,182 m^{3})
- Useful lift: 4,115 lb (1,867 kg)
- Powerplant: 2 × Continental R-670-2 radials , 210 hp (157 kW) each

Performance

- Maximum speed: 57 mph (92 km/h, 50 kn)
- Cruise speed: 48 mph (77 km/h, 42 kn)
- Endurance: 16 hours 42 minutes

== See also ==
- Navy Air Stations Blimps bases
- US Navy airships during World War II

Related lists

- List of airships of the United States Navy
