= M-class blimp =

M class
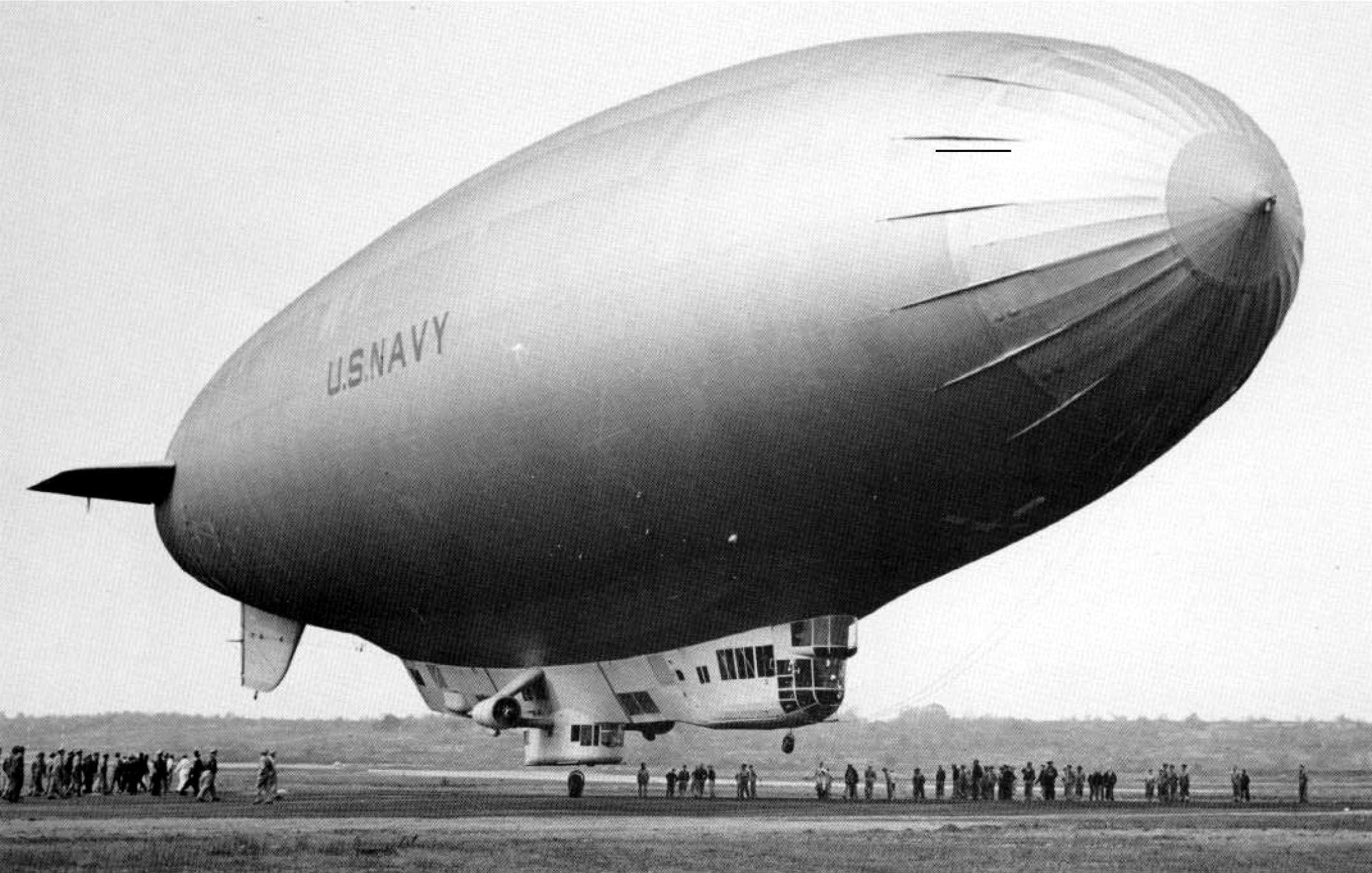

General information
- Type: ASW airship
- Manufacturer: Goodyear Aircraft Corporation
- Primary user: United States Navy
- Number built: 4

History
- First flight: 1944
- Retired: 1956

The Goodyear Aircraft Company of Akron, Ohio built the M-class blimp for the United States Navy as the follow-on to the K-class anti-submarine warfare blimp used during World War II. It was a significantly larger airship, 50% larger than its predecessor. Four airships, designated M-1 through M-4, were delivered in early 1944. Operations of K-ships in tropical regions had shown a need for a blimp with greater volume to offset the loss of lift due to high ambient temperatures.

A contract was awarded to the Goodyear Aircraft Company for the prototype M-class blimp on August 16, 1943. This contract was followed by another contract on September 11, 1943 for 21 M-class blimps. These airships were given the Navy designation of ZNP-M, (Z = lighter-than-air; N = non-rigid; P = patrol; M = type/class.) However, on November 22, 1943, the quantity of blimps was reduced to four. These were delivered to the Navy in February, March, and April 1944. The M-Class airships were retired from service by 1956. The gondola of the M-4 was retained in the conservation area at NAS Lakehurst until the mid-1970s.

The M-class blimps were 310 feet (94 m) long with a 117-foot (36 m) long control car. In order to maintain the proper loading on the catenary, the control car was built in three sections with universal joints between the sections. The catenary is the webbing internal to the envelope from which the control car is hung from the top of the envelope. Control of the weight distribution from the catenary is necessary to control wrinkling of the envelope. The capacity of the envelope of the M-1 was 625,000 cu ft (17,698 m^{3}) with an increase in capacity to 647,000 cu ft (18,321 m^{3}) for M-2 through M-4. These airships were powered by two Pratt & Whitney radial air-cooled engines.

Goodyear produced a final follow-on design, the N-class blimp, in the 1950s. The N-class was 50% larger than its predecessor, which was itself 50% larger than the K-class.

== Specifications (M-2) ==
General characteristics

- Crew: 10-14
- Length: 302 ft 0 in (92.07 m)
- Diameter: 69 ft 6 in (21.19 m)
- Height: 92 ft 6 in (28.20 m)
- Volume: 647,000 cu ft (18,320 m^{3})
- Useful lift: 10,000 lb (4,356 kg)
- Powerplant: 2 × Pratt & Whitney R-1340-AN-2 radials , 550 hp (410 kW) each

Performance

- Maximum speed: 80 mph (128 km/h, 70 kn)
- Cruise speed: 58 mph (93 km/h, 50 kn)
- Endurance: 50 hours 30 minutes

Armament

- 1 × .50 M2 machine gun
- 8 × 350 lb (159 kg) AN-Mk 47 depth charges

== See also ==
- US Navy airships during World War II

Related lists

- List of airships of the United States Navy
