= Houma–Terrebonne Airport =

- IATA: HUM; ICAO: KHUM; FAA LID: HUM

Summary
- Airport type: Public
- Owner: Houma–Terrebonne Airport Commission
- Serves: Houma, Louisiana
- Elevation AMSL: 9 ft (2.7 m)
- Coordinates: 29°33′59″N 090°39′38″W
- Website: www.Houma-airport.com
- Interactive map of Houma–Terrebonne Airport

Runways
Direction	Length		Surface
Direction	ft	m	Surface
18/36	6,508	1,984	Concrete
12/30	4,999	1,524	Concrete

Statistics (2020)
- Aircraft operations: 82,144
- Based aircraft: 144
- Sources: airport web site and FAA

Houma–Terrebonne Airport (IATA: HUM, ICAO: KHUM, FAA LID: HUM) is a public airport located in Houma, a city in Terrebonne Parish, Louisiana, United States, 3 miles (4.8 km) southeast of the city's central business district. It is owned by the Houma–Terrebonne Airport Commission.

== Facilities and aircraft ==
Houma–Terrebonne Airport covers an area of 1,813 acres (734 ha) and has two concrete paved runways. The north–south runway 18/36 is 6,508 by 150 ft (1,984 by 46 m) with a full instrument landing system (ILS). The crosswind runway 12/30 is 4,999 by 185 ft (1,524 by 56 m) with a non-precision approach.

Fixed-base operators (FBOs) serving the airport include Apex Jet Center and Hammonds Air Service.

For the 12-month period ending August 10, 2023, the airport had 82,144 aircraft operations, an average of 225 per day: 100% general aviation and <1% military. At that time there were 144 aircraft based at this airport: 62 single-engine, 19 multi-engine, 6 jet and 57 helicopter.

Bristow Helicopters and Petroleum Helicopters International (PHI) operate helicopters from the airport in support of offshore oil and gas drilling and production activities in the Gulf of Mexico.

== History ==
Houma Airport started originally as Naval Air Station Houma, LA on May 1, 1943, as a station for Lighter-than-Air (LTA) airships. The base was disestablished in November 1947, dismantled, and developed into the Houma–Terrebonne Airport.

=== Previous airline service ===
Several commuter air carriers served Houma with scheduled passenger flights during the 1970s and early 1980s.

In 1974-1975 Gulf Coast Airlines was operating six nonstop flights a day to New Orleans International Airport (MSY) with Britten-Norman Islander twin prop commuter aircraft.

In 1978 Royale Airlines was operating nonstop service to New Orleans (MSY) with Beechcraft 99 commuter turboprops.

In 1979, Universal Airways was operating five direct one stop flights every weekday to Houston Hobby Airport (HOU) via Patterson, LA as well as four nonstop flights every weekday to New Orleans (MSY) with all services being operated with Beechcraft Queen Air twin prop commuter aircraft.

From the late 1970s to the early 1980s, Houma-based Hammonds Flying Service (which is now local FBO operator Hammond Air Service) was operating four direct flights every weekday to Houston Hobby Airport (HOU) with twin prop Piper aircraft and de Havilland Canada DHC-6 Twin Otter commuter turboprops via intermediate stops in Patterson, LA and Lafayette, LA.

The airport currently does not have any scheduled passenger airline service.

== See also ==
- List of airports in Louisiana
- Navy Air Stations Blimps bases
