= TC-class blimp =

Type of blimp

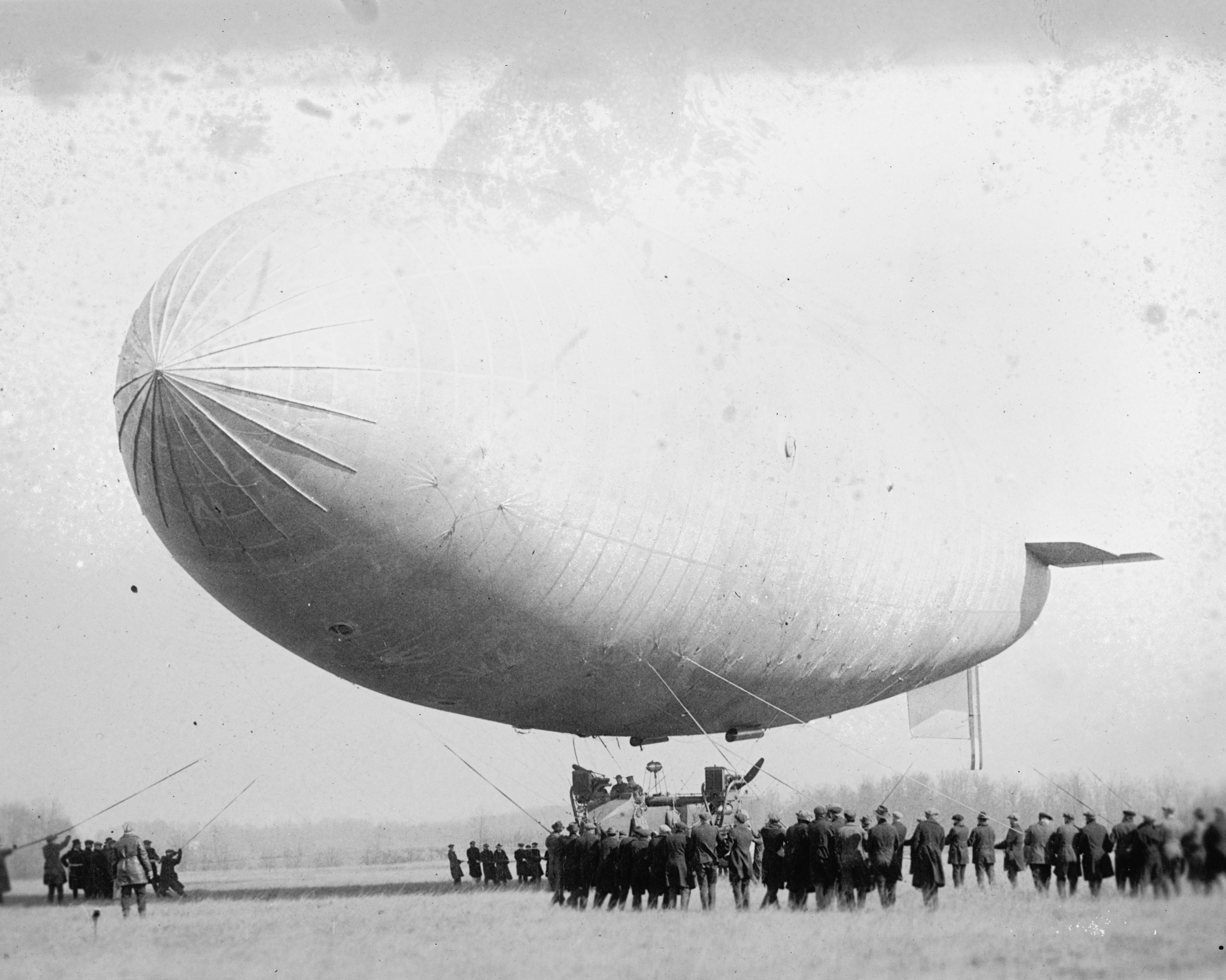
T C Army airship in 1923

The TC-3 and the TC-7 were the two United States Army Air Corps non-rigid blimps used for parasite fighter trials conducted in 1923–24. A single Sperry Messenger biplane was equipped with a skyhook to engage the temporary trapeze mounted to the control carriage of the blimp itself. The first successful docking was achieved on December 15, 1924. Despite the completely successful results of the program, the Army chose not to develop the concept further. It was the Navy which began the better-known project in 1925 using rigid airships, the USS Los Angeles (ZR-3), the USS Macon (ZRS-5) and the USS Akron (ZRS-4).

Scott Field in St. Clair County, Illinois, had a US Army Lighter-than-Air Base from 1921–1937 for training, including J-class blimps. In 1937, the Army Air Corps ended its airship program and transferred all its LTA material to the Navy, only two blimps were used by the Navy: TC-13 and TC-14.

== See also ==
- U.S. Army airships
