= Naval Air Station Hitchcock =

Former American air base in Texaa

Coordinates: 29°19′50″N 95°02′37″W

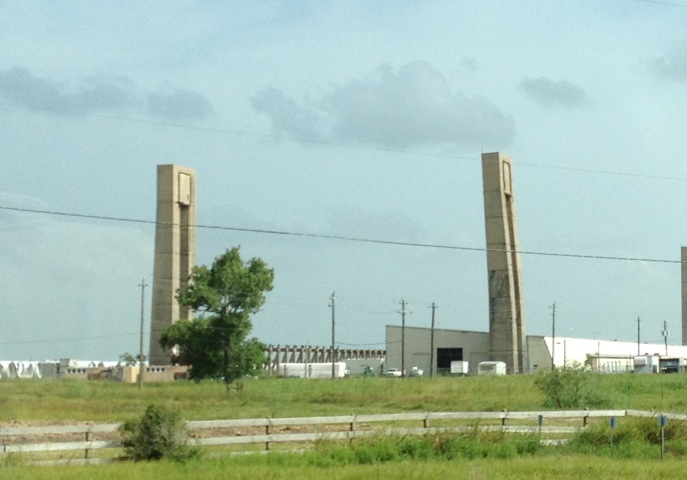
Concrete supports for the former blimp hangar.

Naval Air Station Hitchcock was a Naval Air Station built by the United States Navy during World War II to accommodate lighter-than-air aircraft, more commonly known as blimps. It was located in the small town of Hitchcock, Texas, about fifteen miles (24 km) northwest of Galveston.

== History ==
Construction began in 1942 and the base was commissioned on May 22, 1943. The most prominent feature of the base was the 1,000-foot (300 m) long, 200-foot (61 m) tall largely wooden blimp hangar.

The blimp hangar, which held six aircraft was built at a cost of $10 million. The purpose of the base and its aircraft was to search for Axis power submarines in the Gulf of Mexico. Beside the hangar there were auxiliary buildings including barracks, warehouses, a mess hall, gymnasium, auditorium and an Olympic-size swimming pool which was used to teach swimming and water-rescue.

=== Post-WWII ===
The base was sold as war surplus in 1949 for $143,777 to John W. Mecom Sr., who leased the building during the Korean War to remanufacture half-track vehicle and World War II tanks for use in the Korean War. Because of damage sustained from Hurricane Carla in 1961, the wooden parts of the hangar were demolished in 1962. The only parts of the hangar still standing are the four tall concrete corner supports and the concrete foundation.

Camp Wallace, a U.S. Army World War II training center for antiaircraft units, was located adjacent to the base.

== See also ==
- Tillamook Air Museum which has similar but more complete hangar.
- Navy Air Stations Blimps bases
