= J-class blimp =

Type of airship

J class
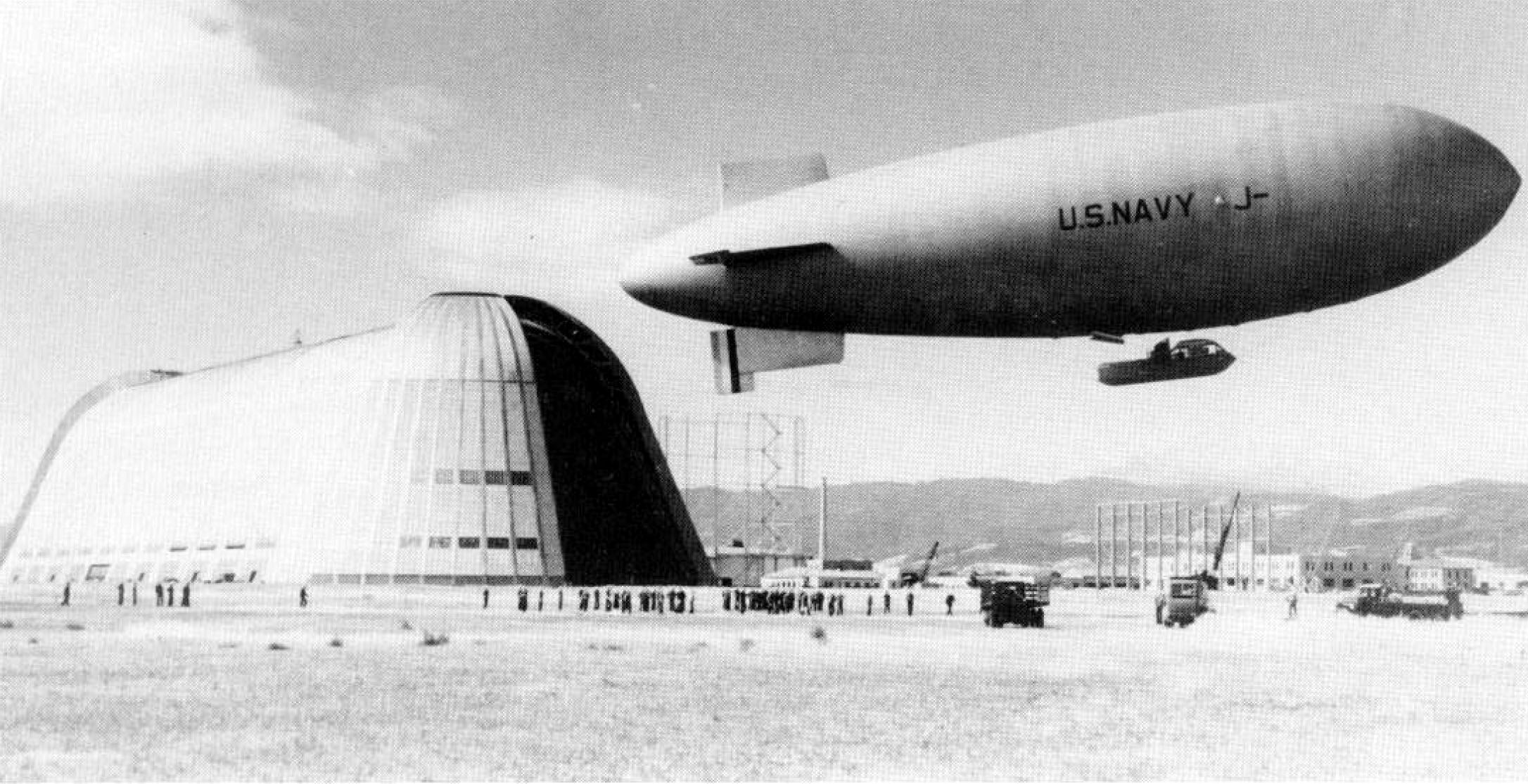
- NAVY J-4

General information
- Type: Patrol airship
- Manufacturer: Goodyear-Zeppelin Corporation
- Primary users: US Navy US Army
- Number built: 3

History
- First flight: 31 August 1922
- Retired: 1940

The J-class blimps were non-rigid airships designed by the Navy Bureau of Aeronautics and Goodyear Tire & Rubber Company in the early 1920s for the US Navy.

== Design and development ==
Designed in 1919, the J-type were to be improvements upon the D-type. Improvements included a smaller envelope (174,800 cu ft), more powerful engines, a new, simple boat style control car capable of water landings and a single ballonet to reduce weight as tried in the H-1. Two airships, designated J-1 and J-2, were ordered. J-1 first flew 31 August 1922 at Wingfoot Lake. The J-1 was operated at Hampton Roads until airship operations there were terminated in 1924. From May 1924 the J-1 served at Lakehurst, and was at that time the Navy's only active blimp. Due to the single ballonet, the J-1 proved difficult to handle. J-1 was retired in August 1924. J-2 was cancelled due to the failure of the single ballonet J-1, with the car being stored at the Naval Aircraft Factory.

J-3 was assembled from an Army TC type envelope and control car, modified to suit the Navy. Instrumentation came from the J-1. The J-3 first flew 12 October 1926. Lakehurst was the only naval air station which the J-3 served at. Its role was to train crews for the ZR-3 and ZRS-4 and 5. The J-3 was lost on April 4, 1933, during a forced landing while searching for survivors of the Navy rigid airship USS Akron (ZRS-4) with the loss of 2 out of the blimp's crew of 7. Rescue was made by a United States Coast Guard and New York Police Department amphibians. J-4 utilized the J-2 control car, modified by enclosing it, and a TC-type envelope. It was test flown in November 1927. The J-4 served as a trainer at Lakehurst until it was sent to Sunnyvale in the summer of 1933. After the Army took over Sunnyvale, the J-4 was returned to Lakehurst in May 1935. The J-4 was stricken from the Navy registry in March 1940.

The J-class blimps were equipped with a control car that was suspended externally from the envelope. Utilizing helium for lift, the envelope capacity was 210,000 cu ft (5,900 m^{3}). Two radial engines powered the blimp.

== Operators ==
United States

- United States Army As TC Class Blimps
- United States Navy

== Specifications (J-3 and J-4) ==
General characteristics

- Crew: 5-6
- Length: 196 ft 0 in (59.76 m)
- Diameter: 44 ft 6 in (13.57 m)
- Height: 58 ft 0 in (17.68 m)
- Volume: 210,600 cu ft (5,964 m^{3})
- Useful lift: 4,600 lb (2,087 kg)
- Powerplant: 1 × Union , 130 hp (97 kW)

Performance

- Maximum speed: 60 mph (96 km/h, 52 kn)
- Cruise speed: 46 mph (74 km/h, 40 kn)
- Range: 970 mi (1,556 km, 840 nmi)
- Endurance: 52 hours
- Service ceiling: 8,000 ft (2,439 m)

== See also ==
Related lists

- List of airships of the United States Navy
- List of airship accidents
