= Mooring mast =

Structure for the docking of an airship

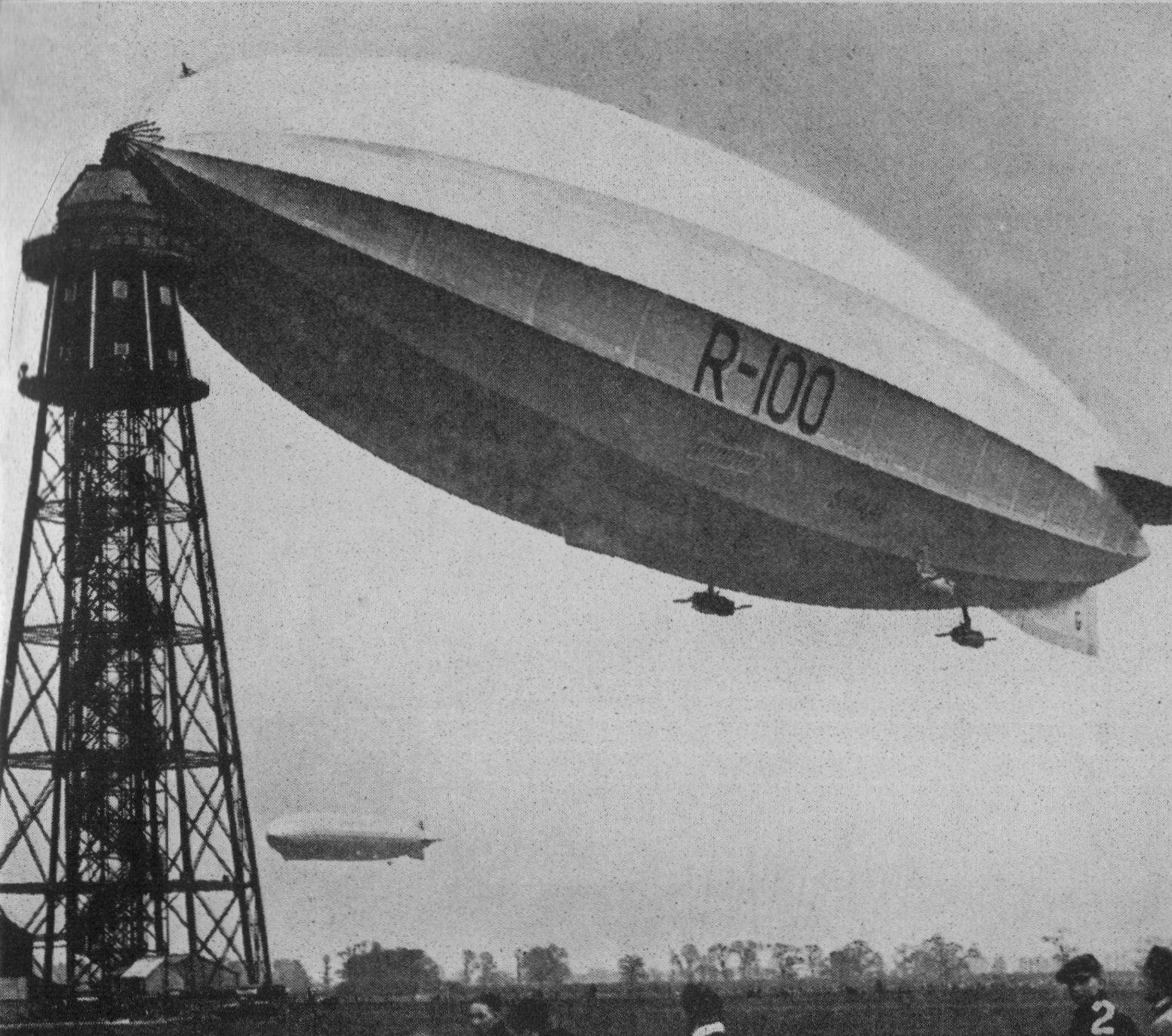
British rigid airship R100 moored at a mooring mast in Cardington, Bedfordshire (1938)

A mooring mast, or mooring tower, is a structure designed to allow for the docking of an airship outside of an airship hangar or similar structure. More specifically, a mooring mast is a mast or tower that contains a fitting on its top that allows for the bow of the airship to attach its mooring line to the structure. When it is not necessary or convenient to put an airship into its hangar (or shed) between flights, airships can be moored on the surface of land or water, in the air to one or more wires, or to a mooring mast. After their development mooring masts became the standard approach to mooring airships as considerable manhandling was avoided.

== Mast types ==
Airship mooring masts can be broadly divided into fixed high masts and fixed or mobile low (or ‘stub’) masts. In the 1920s and 1930s masts were built in many countries. At least two were mounted on ships. Without doubt the tallest mooring mast ever designed was the spire of the Empire State Building which was originally constructed to serve as a mooring mast, although soon after converted for use as a television and radio transmitter tower due to the discovered infeasibility of mooring an airship, for any length of time, to a very tall mast in the middle of an urban area.

Another unique example may be found in Birmingham, Alabama, atop the former Thomas Jefferson Hotel. Now known as Thomas Jefferson Tower, the mast has been recently restored to its original appearance. It was originally erected in 1929 as a way for the hotel to capitalize on the futuristic public image of airships inspired by the success of Graf Zeppelin. However, the tower itself was never intended to be used and would likely not withstand the stresses involved.

The Rand Building in 1943.

The mooring mast atop the Rand Building in downtown Buffalo was similar, with the mast designed to attract what was then a popular means of air traffic. However, records from the local Courier Express and Buffalo Evening News have no reference to a zeppelin using this particular mast.

== Leonardo Torres Quevedo ==
The structure known as the ‘mooring mast’ was invented over 100 years ago when a solution was needed for ground handling problems that resulted in many airships crashing, being deflated or being significantly damaged. Previously to the mooring mast, major problems with mooring emerged as on-land sheds could not handle adverse weather conditions and meant many airships were damaged when landing. In their book, González-Redondo & Camplin discuss the first attempted solution that partially overcame the ground-handling difficulties, a shed that floated on water which could turn freely and automatically align its long axis with the direction of the wind. This meant that airships could now land regardless of air currents. Airship design was then altered to allow blimps to float on water so that they could be placed into their water hangars more easily, but a lack of any method of open mooring meant that airships still suffered from engine failure, damage due to a change in weather conditions (storms) and operational difficulties involved in such anchoring systems. Multiple airships were lost under such circumstances. In an attempt to avoid the various issues with loading airships into their sheds and to prevent further accidents, engineers would often deflate their blimps, accepting the financial loss and time cost of any damage caused by dismantling it out in the open.

To find a resolution to the slew of problems faced by airship engineers to dock dirigibles, Spanish engineer and inventor Leonardo Torres Quevedo drew up designs of a ‘docking station’ and made alterations to airship designs. In 1910, Torres Quevedo proposed the idea of attaching an airship's nose to a mooring mast and allowing the airship to weathervane with changes of wind direction (see Fig.1). The use of a metal column erected on the ground, the top of which the bow or stem would be directly attached to (by a cable) would allow a dirigible to be moored at any time, in the open, regardless of wind speeds. Additionally, Torres Quevedo's design called for the improvement and accessibility of temporary landing sites, where airships were to be moored for the purpose of disembarkation of passengers. The final patent was presented in February 1911 and Leonardo stated his claims regarding the nature of his invention as such:

1) '[The mooring mast] comprised a metal column erected on the ground to the top of which the bow or stern of the airship was directly attached by a cable

2) [The airship] moors at the top of the metal column on a pivoted platform so that it can turn in a circle about the column and remain end-on to the wind;

3) The “crab” or winch receiving the end of a cable attached to the airship and the point of attachment on the airship; and

4) The cone connected to the upper end of the column, conforming to the end of the airship'

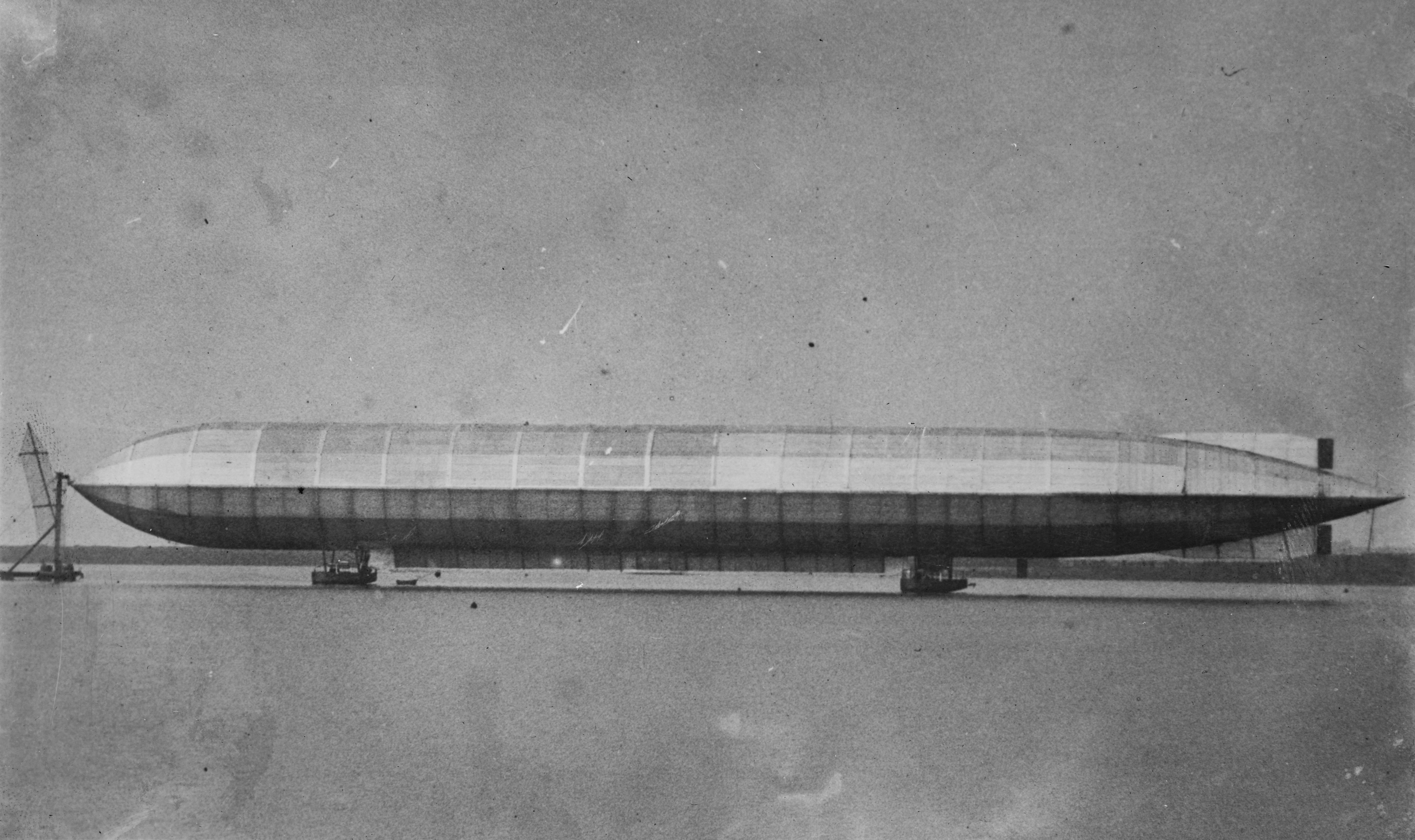
HMA No. 1 (Mayfly) – the first airship known to have been moored to a mast. It broke in two and never flew.

== Early enhancements ==
Mooring an airship by the nose to the top of a mast or tower of some kind might appear to be an obvious solution, but dirigibles had been flying for some years before the mooring mast made its appearance. The first airship known to have been moored to a mast was HMA (His Majesty's Airship) No.1, named the ‘Mayfly’, on 22 May 1911. The 38 ft (12 m) mast was mounted on a pontoon, and a windbreak of cross-yards with strips of canvas were attached to it. However, the windbreak caused the ship to yaw badly, and she became more stable when it was removed, withstanding winds gusting up to 43 miles per hour (69 km/h). Further experiments in mooring blimps to cable-stayed lattice masts were carried out during 1918.

== Impact of minor developments following Leonardo Torres Quevedo's design ==
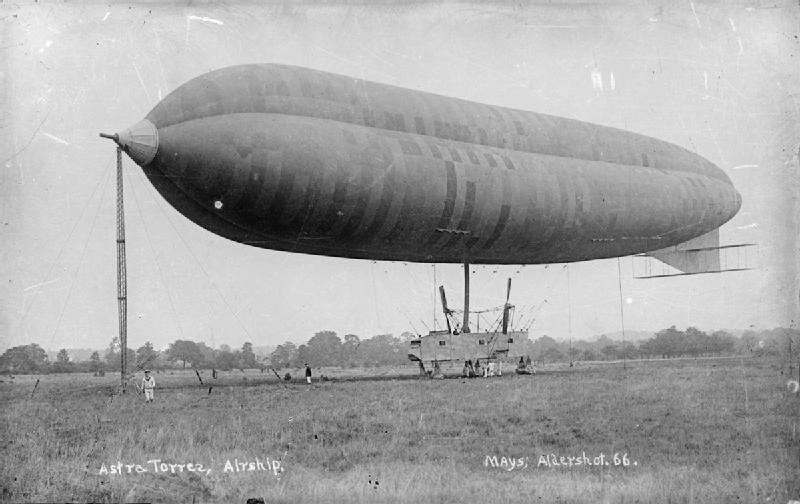
The Astra-Torres airship attached to a portable mooring post in 1913.

Mooring mast technology following Leonardo Torres Quevedo's design became widely utilised in the 20th century as it allowed an unprecedented accessibility to dirigibles, negating the manhandling that was necessary when an airship was placed into its hangar. Due to his inventions, mooring masts were designed simply to allow airships to be docked on ships, land and even atop buildings, all while withstanding gusts and adverse weather conditions. Such versatility meant that mooring masts became the standard approach to docking dirigibles, as blimps could now operate from mobile masts for long periods of time without returning to their hangars. Developments to these mooring technologies allowed for further advancement of airspace technology in the 20th century.

After the advent of Torres Quevedo's revolutionary rotating mooring tip, the mooring mast structure was constantly improved and developed upon over the following decade. High and low masts were experimented with by French, English, American and German engineers in order to determine which technique was the most effective in terms of stability, cost, ground-handling and their ability to allow blimps to weathervane and therefore minimise outdoor-related damage. The procedures for mooring to either a low or high mast were the same, with the blimp approaching the protected side of the mast at the same height. The nose winch is then attached, and the dirigible is fixed into the rotating mast tip, free to move with the wind. Low masts required a number of ground crew members to constantly attend to the changing directions of the wind as they attempted to re-inflate and repair the airships. In order to reduce the large number of men required to bring the blimps in and out of their hangars and on and off their masts, a number of additions were made to Torres Quevedo's traditional design. Examples of these include cradles and lattices that were attached to mobile mooring structures to further limit the amount of yawing and pitching, and pyramidal towing masts known as “iron horses” that were able to extend the height of the original mast structure.

Between 1900 and 1939, ground handling methods for rigid-airships were constantly developed on. Split into three main systems; The German, The British and the American, these procedural techniques each has major advantages and disadvantages. The British system (as discussed in Gabriel Khoury's Airship Technology) is most similar to Torres Quevedo's design, which makes sense seeing as his patent was the main influence for British engineers concerned with mooring dirigibles at the time. All three major rigid airship ground handling systems are extensively discussed in his book.

== British high mast operations ==
The British mooring mast was developed more or less to its final form at RNAS Pulham and Cardington in 1919–21 to make the landing process easier and more economical of manpower

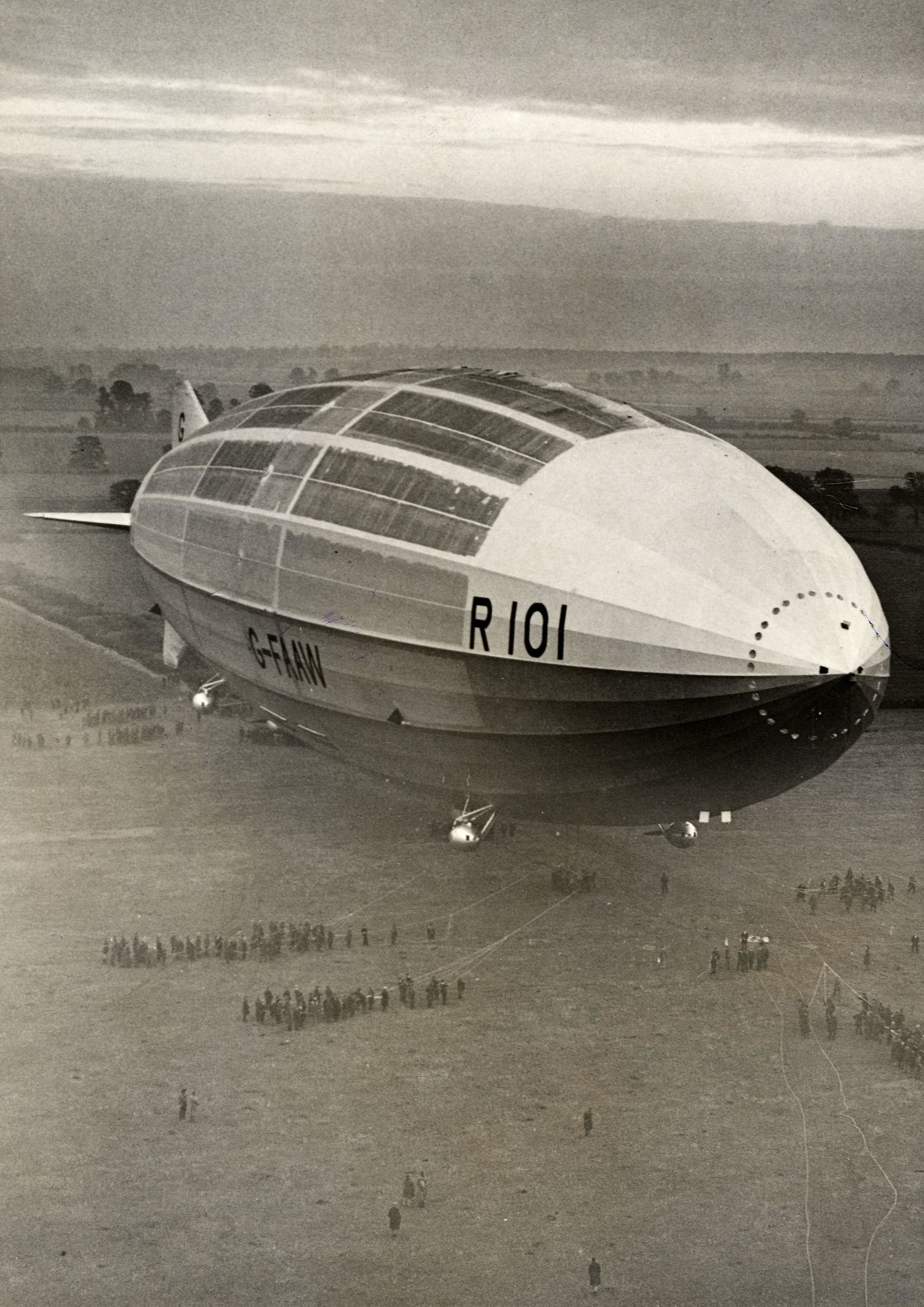
The R101 being handled on the ground, showing the size of the landing party required to manage a large airship. One purpose of a mooring mast was to reduce the number of men needed to manage the landing process.

The following account of the British high mast in its fully developed state at Cardington, and its operation, is abridged from Masefield.

Mooring masts were developed to act as a safe open harbour to which airships could be moored or unmoored in any weather, and at which they could receive (hydrogen or helium) gas, fuel, stores and payload.

The Cardington mast, completed in 1926, was an eight sided steel girder structure, 200 feet (61 m) high, tapering from 70 feet (21 m) diameter at ground level to 26 feet 6 inches (8.1 m) at the passenger platform, 170 feet (52 m) from the ground. Above the passenger platform was the 30 feet (9.1 m) of the conical housing for the mooring gear. A lower platform 142 feet (43 m) above the ground accommodated searchlights and signalling gear in a gallery 4 feet (1.2 m) wide. The top platform, at the height of 170 feet (52 m), from which passengers embarked and disembarked to and from the airships, was 40 feet (12 m) in diameter and encircled by a heavy parapet. The top rail of the parapet formed a track on which a gangway, let down from the airship, ran on wheels to give freedom for the airship to move around the tower as it swung with the wind. An electric passenger lift ran up the centre of the tower, encircled by a stairway to provide foot access.

The upper portion of the tower, from the passenger platform upwards, was a circular steel turret surmounted by a truncated cone with its top 23 feet (7.0 m) above the passenger platform. A three-part telescopic arm, mounted on gimbals, projected through an opening at the top, free to swing from the vertical in any direction up to 30 degrees of movement. The top of the arm consisted of a bell-shaped cup mounted to rotate on ball bearings.

A cable extended through the bell-mouth which, linked to a cable dropped from airship to be moored, enabled the nose of the airship to be drawn down until a cone on the nose locked home into the cup and so secured the airship to the tower. The telescopic arm was then centred, locked in the vertical position, and made free to rotate on a vertical axis so the airship could swing, nose to tower, in any direction of the wind.

In the machinery house at the base of the tower three steam-driven winches operated the hauling gear through drums 5 feet (1.5 m) in diameter to give cable hauling speeds of 50 feet a minute.

While an airship approached the mast slowly against the wind a mooring cable was let out from nose to the ground and linked, by a ground party, to the end of the mooring cable paid out from the mast head. The cable was then slowly wound in with the airship riding about 600 feet (180 m) above the mast and down wind, with one engine running astern to maintain a pull on the cable. At this point, two side wires – or ‘yaw guys’ – were also connected to cables taken from the nose of the airship to pulley blocks some hundreds of feet apart on the ground and thence to winches at the base of the mast.

All three cables were then wound in together, the main pull being taken on the mooring cable while the yaw guys steadied the ship. When all the cable had been wound, an articulated mooring cone on the nose of the airship locked home into the cup on the mast. The mast fitting was made free to rotate as the airship swung with the wind with freedom also for pitch and roll.

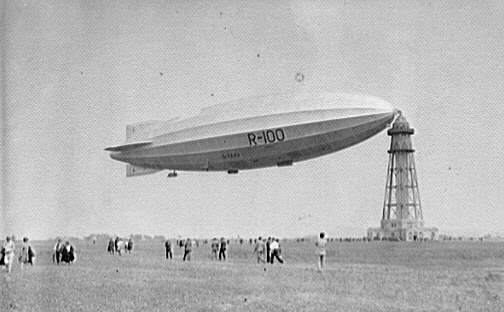
The R100 at the mooring mast in Montreal, Quebec, Canada, 1930

A gangway, like a drawbridge, which could be drawn up flush with the nose of the airship, was then let down with its free end resting on the parapet of the platform running round the mast. Passengers and crew boarded and disembarked from the ship under cover along this gangway. About twelve men were needed to moor an airship to a mast.

Four high masts of the Cardington type were built along the proposed British Empire Airship Service routes, at Cardington itself, at Montreal (Canada), Ismailia (Egypt) and Karachi (then India, now in Pakistan). None of these survive. Similar masts were proposed at sites in Australia, Ceylon (now Sri Lanka), Bombay, Keeling Islands, Kenya, Malta, at Ohakea in New Zealand, and in South Africa. The general site specifications can be found in documents produced by the British government.

== German mast techniques ==
German mooring methods differed significantly from those adopted by the British. To quote Pugsley (1981):

"the Germans, originally for ease of transport and for economy, developed a system using much lower masts. The nose of the ship was tethered as before to the mast head, which was only a little higher than the semi-diameter of the ship's hull. The lower fin at the stern was then fixed to a heavy carriage running on a circular railway track around the mast, and this carriage was powered so as to be able to move around the track to keep the ship head on to the wind. In the most sophisticated form, used by the Hindenburg, the rail system was linked to rails running from the mast straight into the airship shed, and the mast was powered so that the ship could be moved mechanically into the shed, complete with mast and stern carriage".

The following account of landing the German airship Graf Zeppelin is abridged from Dick and Robinson (1985):

Before attempting a landing, contact was made by radio or flag signals with the ground crew to determine the ground temperature and wind conditions. For a normal calm weather landing the ship was trimmed very slightly nose down, as this gave a better gliding angle and the ship almost flew herself down. A smoky fire was started on the ground to show the wind direction. The ship then made a long approach with a rate of fall of 100 feet per minute, and the lines were dropped when she was over the landing flag. When conditions were unusual, as in gusty and bumpy weather, the Graf was weighed off a little light, and the approach had to be fast and preferably long and low.

When the airship was over the field the engines had to be reversed for some time to stop her, and this also helped to get the nose down. Yaw lines dropped from the ship's nose were drawn out to Port and Starboard by thirty men each, while twenty more on each side pulled the ship down with spider lines (so called because twenty short lines radiated like the legs of a spider from a block). When the airship reached the ground, fifty men held the control car rails and twenty held those of the after car. With thirty men in reserve, the ground crew totalled two hundred men.

The ground crew would then walk the Graf to a short, or ‘stub’, mast, to which the nose of the airship would be attached. The airship would then rest on the ground with its rear gondola attached to a movable weighted carriage that enabled the airship to swing around the mast with the wind. In some places the stub mast was mounted on rails and could be drawn into the airship hangar, guiding the nose of the ship while the tail was controlled by the carriage attached to the rear gondola. Airships designed for landing on the ground had pneumatic bumper bags or undercarriage wheels under the main and rear gondolas (or tail fin).

Dick states that the Germans never used mooring masts until the Graf Zeppelin entered service in 1928, and never moored to high masts. To some extent this probably reflects the conservatism of the Zeppelin company operations. Long experience in handling airships in all sorts of conditions was valued and innovations or significant changes in practice were unlikely to be adopted unless clear advantages were apparent.

== United States ==
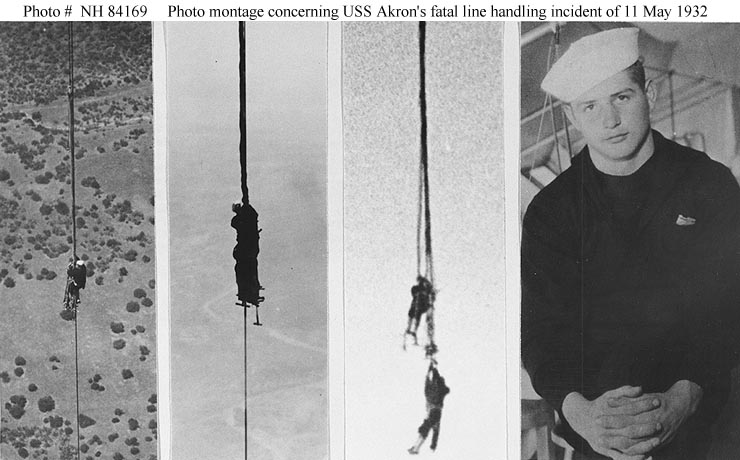
The sailors carried away by Akron in 1932.

In the US a mix of techniques were applied, and airships moored to both high and stub masts. Large ground crews (or ‘landing parties’) of up to 340 men were required to manage the large airships Akron and Macon at landing or on the ground, before they could be attached to the stub mast. Being part of a ground crew was not risk-free. In gusty conditions, or if mis-handled, an airship could suddenly rise. If the ground crew did not immediately let go of the handling lines they risked being carried off their feet. In one famous incident captured on movie film in 1932, during the landing of the US airship Akron, three men were carried off their feet in this way, two to fall to their deaths after a short time. The third managed to improve his hold on the handling rope until he could be hauled into the airship.

== Ship-mounted mooring masts ==
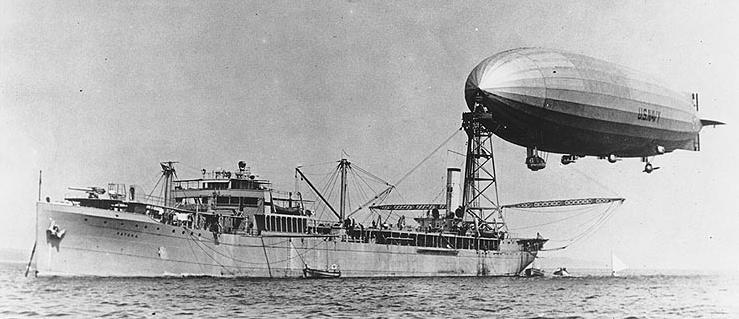
USS Shenandoah moored to the USS Patoka (AO-9).

At least two ships have mounted mooring masts. As the US intended to use large airships for long-range maritime patrol operations, experiments were made in mooring airships to a mast mounted on the ship USS Patoka.

Over time the airships USS Shenandoah, Los Angeles, and Akron all moored to the mast mounted at the stern of the ship, and operated using her as a base for resupply, refuelling, and gassing.

Spanish seaplane carrier Dédalo.

The Spanish seaplane carrier Dédalo (1922–1935) carried a mooring mast at the bow to cater for small dirigibles carried on board.

Around 1925, the Royal Navy considered the monitor, HMS Roberts, for conversion to a mobile airship base with a mooring mast and fueling capabilities, but nothing came of this proposal.

== Utilisation of mooring mast technology ==
By 1912, dirigibles were widely acknowledged as the future of air travel and their flexibility as both civilian transporters and military vehicles meant that continual advancements were made to both airships and their mooring masts. The mooring mast or “open-mooring” allowed airships to accompany armies in their manoeuvres through a safe, quick and relatively inexpensive ‘universal’ docking system that worked well for all types and sizes of blimps whether they were non-rigid, semi-rigid or rigid and which could withstand meteorological events. After their involvement in WWI as passenger carriers, aerial reconnaissance vessels and long-distance bombers, military authorities lost interest in airships. However, considerable advancements made in the construction and operation of both dirigibles themselves and mooring technologies meant that airships were soon developed by civilian companies and other government departments.

In 1929, the Empire State Building was proclaimed to be the tallest building in the world, topped with a dirigible mooring mast that could ‘accommodate passengers for the already existing transatlantic routes, and for the routes planned to South America, the West Coast, and across the Pacific’ (Tauranac). The mooring mast was installed to provide unprecedented, accessible air travel, on top of one of the world's most recognisable landmarks. New York would therefore become the epicentre of modern aerospace technology in the United States. However, an obvious drawback to this mooring site is the lack of adequate terminal facilities, with passengers expected to walk down a plank extended from the blimp to the platform on the 102nd floor. It was proposed that buildings were to be knocked down to allow for a “sky terminal” but the costs to this were far too great, so it was dropped. John Tuaranac discusses how only one dirigible ever made contact with the Empire State Building in 1931, and it was “brief at best”:

‘A privately-owned dirigible, fitted with a long rope was in mooring position for half an hour, until the ground crew could catch the rope...fastened atop the mooring mast for three minutes whilst the crew hung on for dear life...the traffic halted below...the dirigible never made permanent contact with the building.'

Today, modern technology has seen a rapid advancement in mooring mast systems, despite the neglect of 20th century dirigibles, which are now often seen as ancient technologies of a long-forgotten past. Indoor and outdoor airships, used predominantly at sports games and in advertising require a modern mooring mast design, fitted with superior measuring devices that can provide an aural warning to the ground crew to move the airship and the mast inside when the atmospheric conditions are not suitable for outdoor storage. Other components such as cameras, mounting and demounting of fins and any repair operations are now made far safer with indoor mooring masts, utilised inside hangars to further promote freedoms of yawing, pitching, rolling and height-adjustability to moored airships.

== Modern-day mooring masts ==
Smaller mobile masts have been used for small airships and blimps for a long time. They may be wheel or track-mounted, and can be operated by a small crew. The general operating principle is broadly similar to the larger masts. Modern blimps may operate from mobile masts for months at a time without returning to their hangars.

Developments in aerodynamics and structural designs as well as greater access to more advanced materials has allowed for airship technologies to become much more sophisticated over the past 30 years. The construction of durable engines has meant that blimps can now fly for considerable periods of time, completely autonomous of a pilot or crew. However, these new innovations have also led to the disuse of mooring masts as the additions of air-cushioned landing systems means dirigibles can be landed almost anywhere without a ground crew or mooring mast, “the onboard computer tells the aircraft what to do and it does it" (Peter DeRobertis). Since the Hindenburg disaster of 1937, whose tragic docking remains an icon of aerospace gone wrong, modern-day airships are now designed as hybrids of lighter-than-air and fixed-wing aircraft. At a fraction of the cost and fuel of regular aircraft, modern dirigibles can carry enormous payloads without requiring such vast amounts of tarmac necessary for conventional air travel.

Despite the disuse of commercial airships popular in the early 20th century, the notion that airships represent the future of air cargo is being revived by a new generation of entrepreneurs. Modern-day mooring masts are still developed on for the utilisation of indoor and outdoor dirigibles. Used mainly at sports games and in advertising, a mooring mast is used to secure these airships and keep them safe in storage. As they traditionally occupy great amounts of space, many engineers now design mooring masts as easily foldable and portable stands with long legs for adequate ground-stability. Such mechanisms employ spring-activated quick-response rods, with special design emphasis placed on kinematic elements to ensure the masts are not placed under great stresses from the weight of the airships. A modern-day solution to the once large mooring towers is portable and foldable masts which guarantee that indoor and outdoor blimps and their masts do not consume a great amount of space. For outdoor airships, spring-loaded devices are incorporated, fitted with alarms which notify ground crews and operators when wind speeds exceed a safe threshold, so that the airship can be taken and stored indoors. For mobility, the masts are mounted on a foldable leg base which can be wheeled around. In terms of indoor dirigibles, lightweight masts are just as stable and portable, accommodating non-rigid blimps up to five metres and successfully limiting yawing, pitching and rolling.

== Image gallery ==
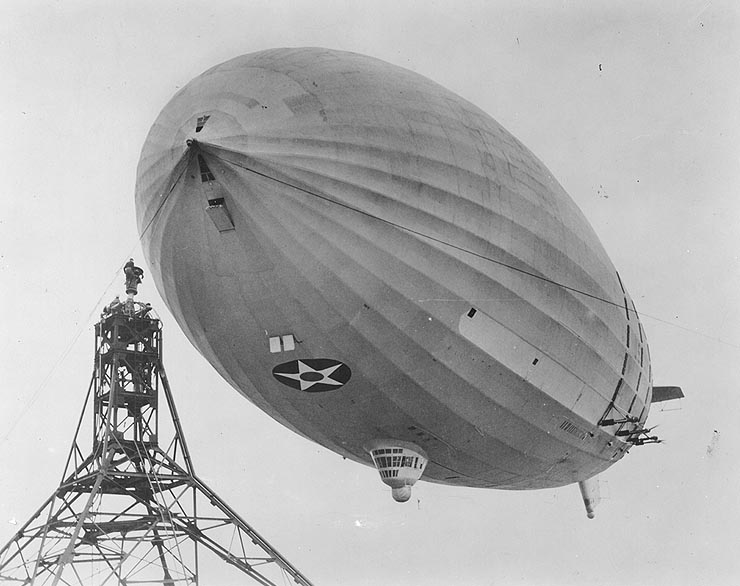
USS Akron approaches mast, circa 1931-1933

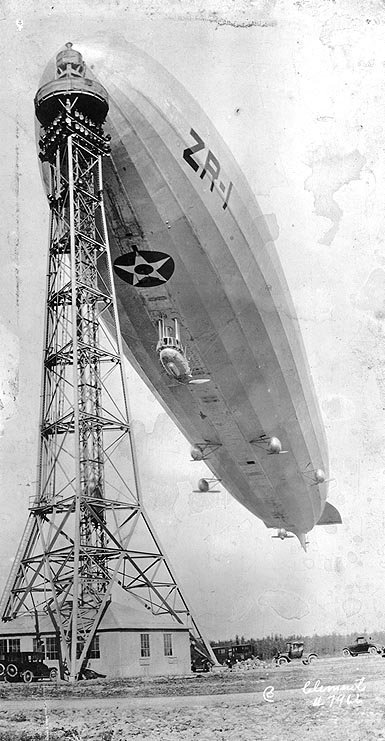
USS Shenandoah attached to a mast

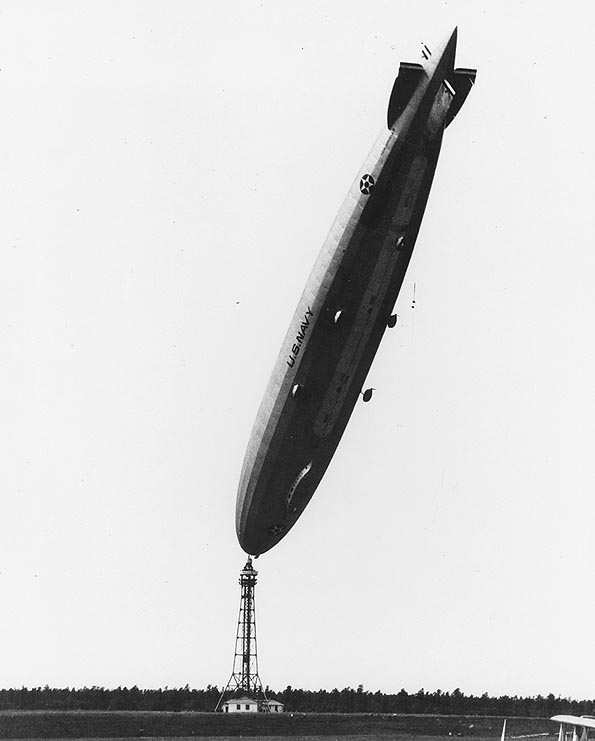
USS Los Angeles at a near-vertical position

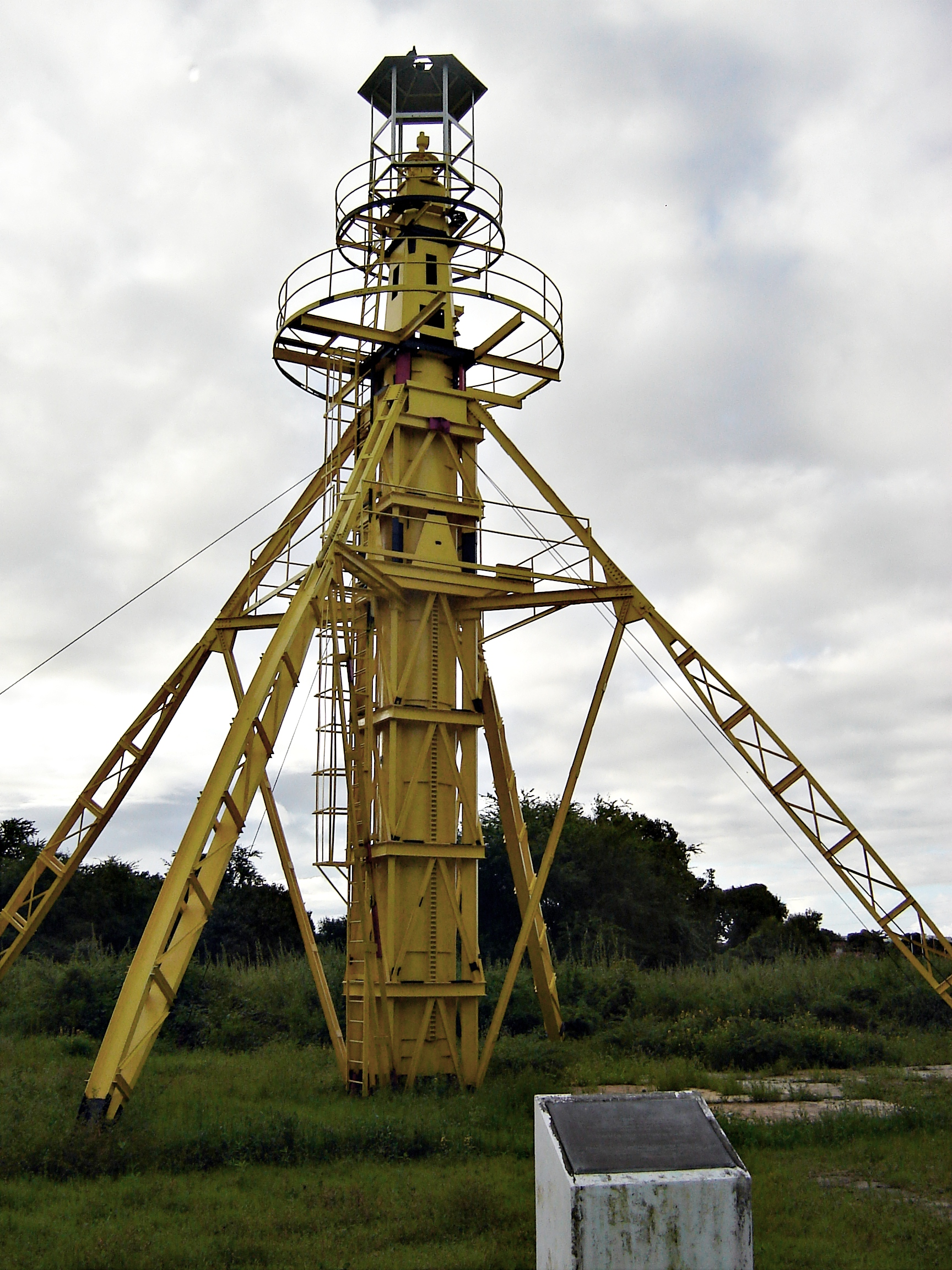
A stub mast in Recife - the only one preserved in its original form. 8°04′42″S 34°55′35″W

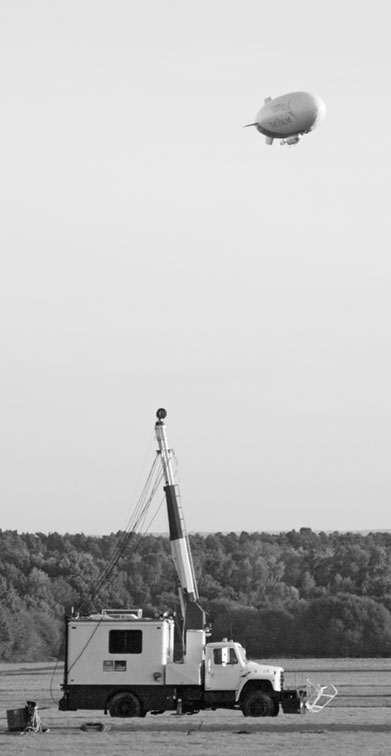
A modern blimp approaches its mobile mooring mast.

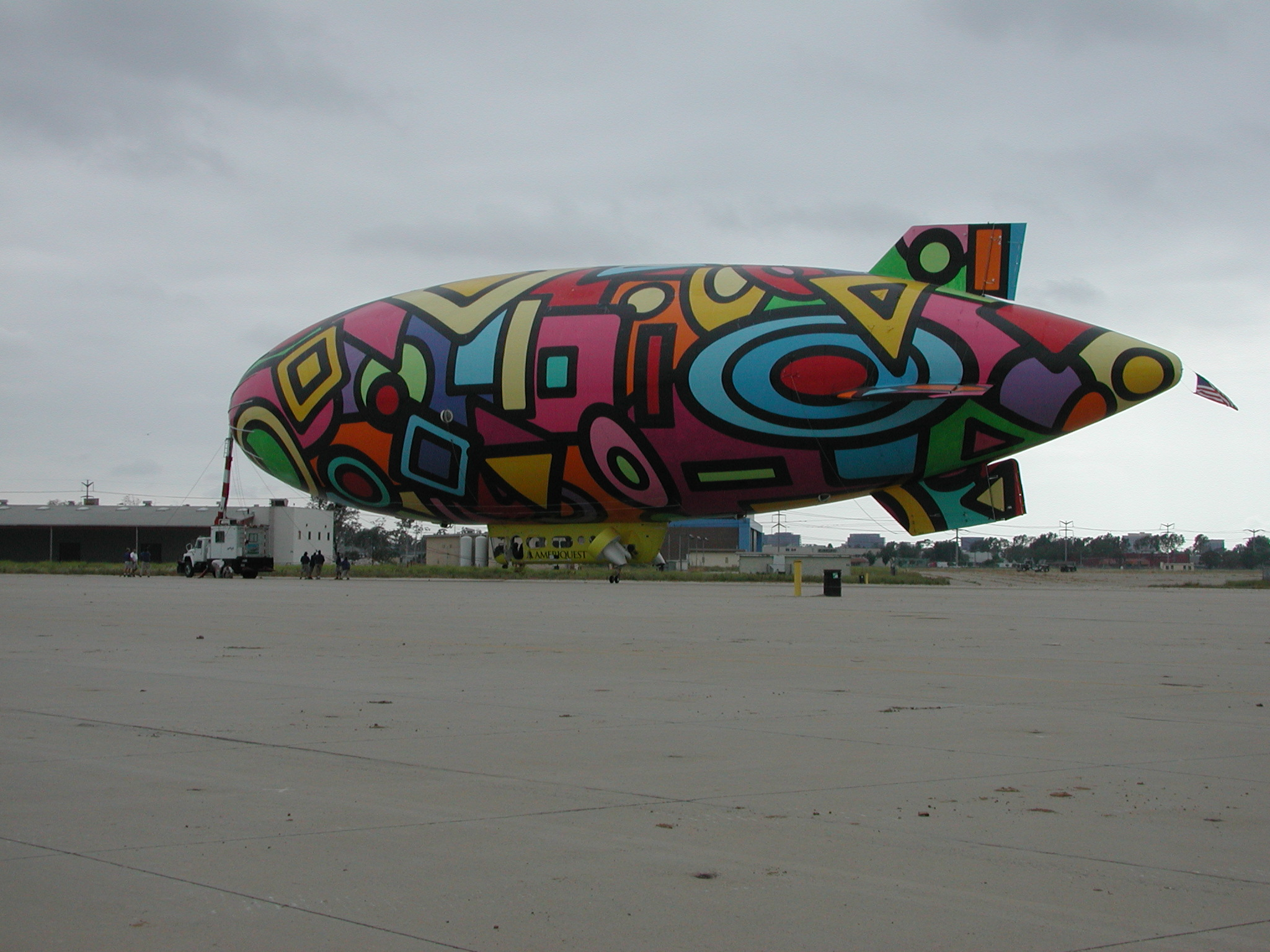
Contemporary ship attached to a mast

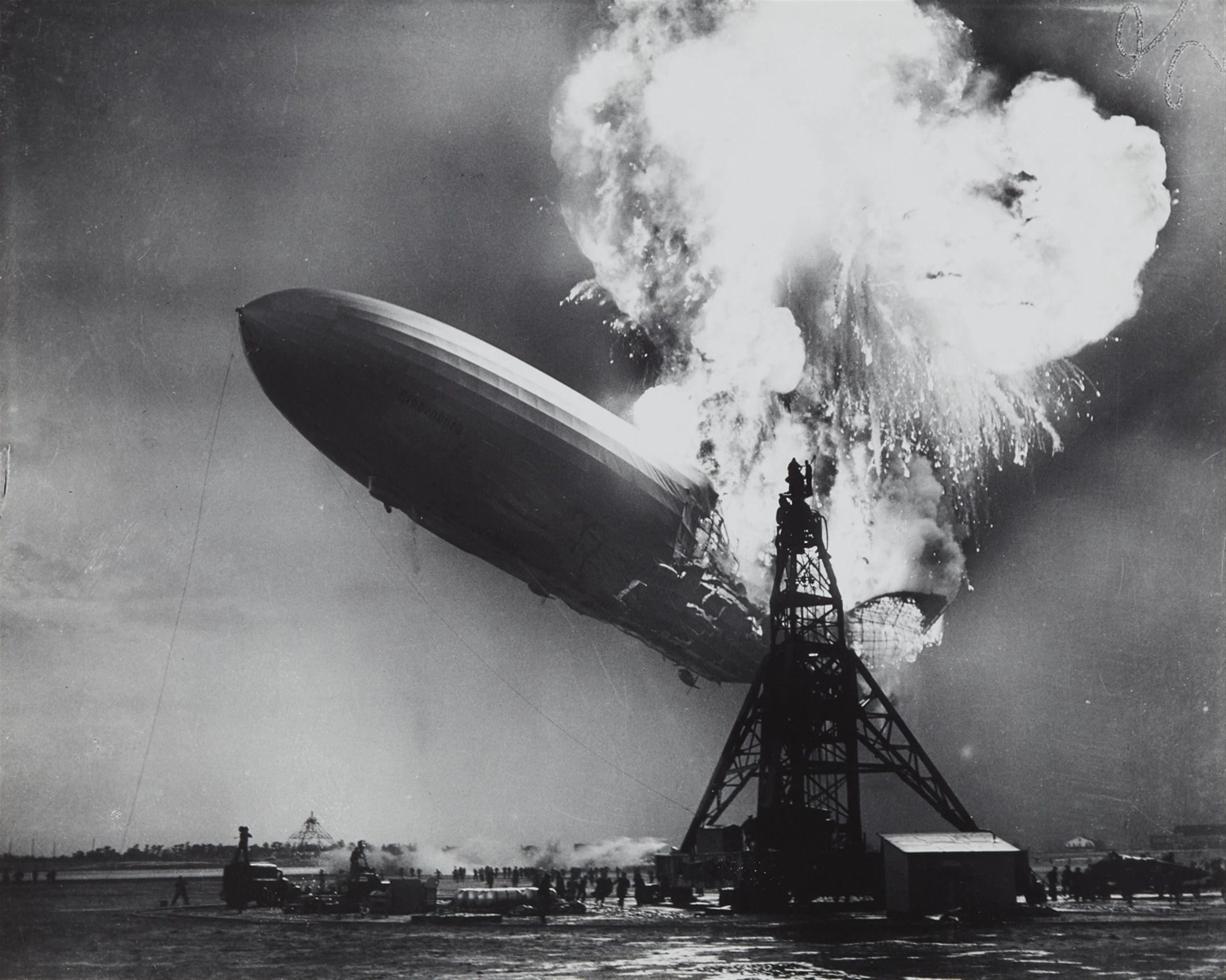
The Hindenburg disaster
