= The Incredible Mr. Limpet =

1964 film by Arthur Lubin

- Theatrical release poster
- Directed by: Arthur Lubin
- Screenplay by: Joe DiMona; Jameson Brewer; John C. Rose
- Based on: Mr Limpet; 1942 novel by Theodore Pratt
- Produced by: John C. Rose
- Starring: Don Knotts; Carole Cook; Jack Weston
- Cinematography: Harold E. Stine
- Edited by: Donald Tait
- Music by: Frank Perkins
- Production company: Warner Bros. Pictures
- Distributed by: Warner Bros. Pictures
- Release date: March 28, 1964
- Running time: 99 minutes
- Country: United States
- Language: English

The Incredible Mr. Limpet is a 1964 American live-action/animated hybrid fantasy comedy film produced by Warner Bros. Pictures and based on the 1942 novel Mr. Limpet by Theodore Pratt. It is about a man named Henry Limpet who turns into a talking fish and helps the U.S. Navy locate and destroy Nazi submarines. Don Knotts plays the title character. The live-action was directed by Arthur Lubin, while the animation was directed by Bill Tytla, Robert McKimson, Hawley Pratt, and Gerry Chiniquy at Warner Bros. Cartoons. Music includes songs by Sammy Fain, in collaboration with Harold Adamson, including "I Wish I Were a Fish", "Be Careful How You Wish" and "Deep Rapture". The film received mixed reviews. It was the final project to be produced and finished at Warner Bros. Cartoons prior to its closure in May 1963.

== Plot ==
The story begins in 1963, where George Stickle (a naval officer) and Admiral Harlock discuss how porpoises in the ocean are displaying unique characteristics and suspect that a former top-secret asset, Henry Limpet, may be teaching the creatures these abilities.

The story flashes back to September 1941 just before the attack on Pearl Harbor. Henry Limpet, a shy bookkeeper, loves fish with a passion and wishes he could be one. His friend George Stickle is a machinist's mate in the United States Navy. Limpet's wife Bessie is fiercely patriotic and Limpet tries to enlist but he is rejected, classified as 4F because of his poor eyesight and other reasons.

While George is on leave, he visits Limpet and Bessie, and they go to Coney Island, where Limpet falls into the water and turns into a fish for unexplained reasons. Since he never resurfaces nor can he swim, Bessie and George assume he has drowned.

The fish Limpet, complete with his signature pince-nez spectacles, discovers a new-found ability during some of his initial misadventures: a powerful underwater roar, his "thrum". He makes friends with Crusty, a misanthropic hermit crab. After saving a female fish he names Ladyfish (the concept of names being unknown to her), he falls in love with her despite already being married.

After the attack on Pearl Harbor, Limpet directs a Navy convoy to a nearby German U-boat. Determined to help the Navy on an ongoing basis, Limpet contacts the convoy and requests to see George. With George's help, Limpet gets himself commissioned by the Navy, complete with an advanced rank and a salary, which he sends to Bessie. He helps the Navy locate Nazi U-boats by signaling with his "thrum", and plays a large part in the Allied victory in the Battle of the Atlantic. In his final mission, he is nearly killed when the Nazis develop a "thrum"-seeking torpedo and is further handicapped by the loss of his spectacles. He manages to survive using Crusty as his "navigator", and sinks U-boats by redirecting their torpedoes. After the battle, he swims to Coney Island to say goodbye to Bessie, who gives him a replacement set of glasses. He then swims off with Ladyfish.

In the film's coda, back in 1963, George and the Admiral travel out to sea to contact Limpet about whether he is training the porpoises.

== Cast ==
- Don Knotts as Henry Limpet
- Carole Cook as Bessie Limpet
- Jack Weston as Machinist's Mate 2nd Class (PO2) George Stickle
- Andrew Duggan as Harlock
- Larry Keating as Admiral P.P. Spewter
- Oscar Beregi Jr. as Nazi admiral
- Charles Meredith as Fleet Admiral
- Elizabeth MacRae as Ladyfish (voice)
- Paul Frees as Crusty (voice)
- Phil Arnold as Short Fishman (uncredited)

This was the last film of Larry Keating and Charles Meredith; both died not long after it was finished.

== Production ==
The film was based on a novel by Theodore Pratt which was published in 1942.

Jon Rose and Metro-Goldwyn-Mayer alumnus Jerry Brewer (credited as Jameson Brewer) wrote the script, with Rose producing through Warner Bros. Pictures. Don Knotts signed in March 1962. He planned on making the film on hiatus from The Andy Griffith Show. It was his first lead role in a film. Lubin signed to make the film in July, and filming took place on the Warner backlot later that same month.

Both Don Knotts and Elizabeth MacRae (Limpet and Ladyfish) were employed in Andy Griffith's Mayberry franchises, respectively as deputy Barney Fife and Lou-Ann Poovie, Gomer Pyle's girlfriend in the later seasons of Gomer Pyle, U.S.M.C..

During World War I and World War II, there was a limpet mine, a type of naval mine attached to a target by magnets named because of their superficial similarity to the limpet, a type of gastropod mollusk. "Das Limpet" was the German Navy's identification of Don Knotts' character.

The destroyer USS Alfred A. Cunningham was the naval ship featured in this film. Another ship used in filming was the cruiser USS Galveston, which was referred to as USS Los Angeles in the film. The cruiser USS Los Angeles was offered for use at the time of pre-production planning, but was decommissioned late 1963, before principal filming began. Here lies a double anachronism, in that Los Angeles was not commissioned until late 1945, and Galveston had been converted to a guided missile cruiser, and clearly shows her 1960s configuration with large radars and missile launchers in place of her removed gun turrets.

The animated sequences were handled by Warner Bros. Cartoons under the supervision of Robert McKimson, and it was the final project for the studio prior to its temporary closure in spring 1963, as well as one of the few non-Looney Tunes productions they worked on.

The Coney Island pier, naval scenes, and other aquatic scenes were filmed on Stage 16 at the Warner Bros. Studio. The Stage 16 tank holds two and a half million gallons (nine and a half million liters) of water.

== Release ==
The film had its premiere on January 20, 1964, at the Weeki Wachee Springs Underwater Theater in Spring Hill, Florida. The film went into general release on March 28, 1964.

Knotts called the film "very very good".

=== Reception ===
Upon release, The Incredible Mr. Limpet received mixed reviews. On Rotten Tomatoes, the review aggregator gave an approval rating of 40%, based on 10 reviews.

The Los Angeles Times said the film would induce "many laughs" and also "a tear or two".

Diabolique magazine called it "overlong and clearly budget-challenged but full of charm, and is reminiscent of the Francis movies... an extremely likable story".

== Home media ==
The Incredible Mr. Limpet was released by Warner Home Video on VHS in 1990. On December 3, 1994, the film was reissued on VHS. On October 1, 2002, it was released on DVD. On August 7, 2012, Warner Home Video released the film in high definition on Blu-ray Disc and reissued the DVD on March 24, 2020, through the Warner Archive Collection.

== Cancelled live-action remake ==
A live-action remake of The Incredible Mr. Limpet entered development in 1996 when Leo Benvenuti and Steve Rudnick were hired as screenwriters. By 1997, Jim Carrey entered negotiations to star in the title role, and was confirmed in February 1998 with Steve Oedekerk hired as the writer and director. Knotts was aware of plans for the remake, which he wrote about in his autobiography, and offered his support. Roughly $10 million was spent on animation tests to digitally map Carrey's motion-captured human face onto a fish's body, which produced disastrous results. By March 1999, Oedekerk left the project following creative differences, while Carrey followed suit in July. In April 2000, Warner Bros. Pictures hired Beavis and Butt-Head and King of the Hill creator Mike Judge as director and co-writer, with Robin Williams, Chris Rock, Mike Myers, and Adam Sandler in consideration for the lead role. Filming was set to begin early 2001, but the project did not materialize for undisclosed reasons.

In June 2009, it was announced that Enchanted director Kevin Lima was attached to direct. In 2010, it was reported that Zach Galifianakis was in talks for the lead role. In March 2011, Richard Linklater entered negotiations to helm the project, and was announced as the director in January 2014. That same month, Femke Wolting and Tommy Pallotta had begun working on the design and animation on the project while Galifianakis would reportedly play the lead character. On July 8, 2014, it was announced that Jon Hamm, Danny McBride, Sarah Silverman, Kevin Hart, Josh Gad, Keegan-Michael Key, and Jordan Peele had entered talks for various roles in the film. On August 4, Linklater left the project to concentrate on his next film Everybody Wants Some!!, and the project has not received any updates since.

== Comic book adaptation ==
- Dell Movie Classic: The Incredible Mr. Limpet (August 1964)

== See also ==
- List of American films of 1964
- Help! I'm a Fish
