= USS Los Angeles =

USS Los Angeles has been the name of more than one United States Navy ship or airship, and may refer to:

- USS Los Angeles (ID-1470), a tanker in commission from 1917 to 1919
- USS Los Angeles (ZR-3), an airship in commission from 1924 to 1932
- USS Los Angeles (CA-135), a heavy cruiser in commission from 1945 to 1963
- USS Los Angeles (SSN-688), a submarine in commission from 1976 to 2010
