= List of undesignated military aircraft of the United States =

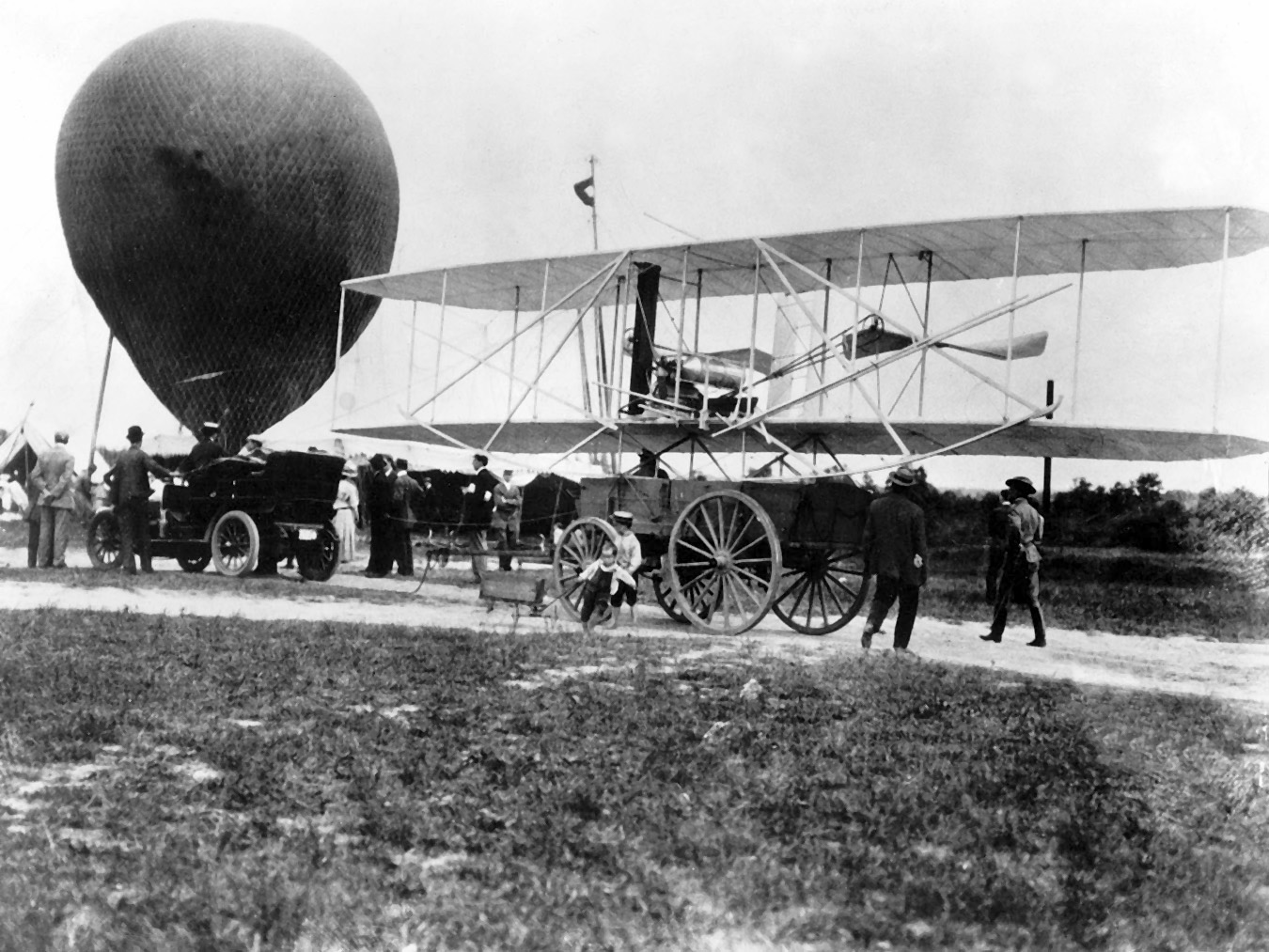
Wright Military Flyer

The United States Army, United States Navy, United States Marine Corps, United States Air Force and its predecessors, and United States Coast Guard operated aircraft when specific alphanumerical designation systems were not in use; these aircraft were referred to by their manufacturers' designations. There were also aircraft in service later that did not receive designations for other reasons, such as foreign military aircraft used for testing or special operations, and civil aircraft purchased off-the-shelf or impressed into service.

For aircraft of the Air Force and its preceding Army air services after the introduction of the 1919 United States Army Air Service aircraft designation system, see the list of United States Air Force aircraft designations (1919–1962). For Navy and Marine Corps aircraft that received designations from 1911–1917 and post–1922 United States Navy aircraft designation system, see the list of United States Navy aircraft designations (pre-1962). For the Army designation system used from 1956 to 1962, after the creation of the Air Force, see 1956 United States Army aircraft designation system. For all United States military aircraft after the implementation of the unified 1962 United States Tri-Service aircraft designation system, see list of United States Tri-Service aircraft designations.

== Army ==
This list includes aircraft operated by the United States Army, Army Signal Corps, and American Expeditionary Forces.

| Type | Origin | Class | Role | Introduced | Retired | Notes |
|---|---|---|---|---|---|---|
| Aeromarine M-1 | US | Propeller | Trainer | 1917 | | Single-engined piston biplane; evaluated but not accepted |
| Airco DH.9 | UK | Propeller | Bomber | 1917 | | Single-engined piston biplane |
| Ansaldo SVA | Italy | Propeller | Reconnaissance | 1917 | | Single-engined piston biplane |
| Avro 504 | UK | Propeller | Trainer | 1913 | | Single-engined piston biplane |
| Bréguet 14 | France | Propeller | Bomber/reconnaissance | 1918 | | Single-engined piston biplane |
| Burgess-Dunne | US | Propeller | Experimental | 1914 or 1915 | | Single-engined tailless piston biplane |
| Burgess Model F | US | Propeller | Trainer | 1911 | | Single-engined piston biplane; license-built Wright Model B |
| Burgess Model H | US | Propeller | Trainer | 1912 | | Single-engined piston biplane |
| Burgess Model I | US | Propeller | Reconnaissance | 1913 | 1915 | Single-engined piston biplane floatplane |
| Burgess Model J | US | Propeller | Scout | 1913 | 1914 | Single-engined piston biplane; license-built Wright Model C |
| Burgess Model U | US | Propeller | Reconnaissance | 1917 | | Single-engined piston biplane floatplane |
| Caudron G.3 | France | Propeller | Reconnaissance | 1917 | | Single-engined piston biplane |
| Caudron G.4 | France | Propeller | Bomber | 1917 | | Two-engined piston biplane |
| Caudron R.11 | France | Propeller | Fighter | 1918 | | Two-engined piston biplane |
| Curtiss Model D | US | Propeller | Trainer | 1911 | 1914 | Single-engined piston biplane |
| Curtiss Model E | US | Propeller | Utility | 1911 | 1914 | Single-engined piston biplane floatplane |
| Curtiss Model F | US | Propeller | Utility | 1913 | | Single-engined piston biplane flying boat |
| Curtiss Model G | US | Propeller | Scout | 1913 | | Single-engined piston biplane |
| Curtiss Model J | US | Propeller | Experimental | 1914 | | Single-engined piston biplane |
| Curtiss Model JN | US | Propeller | Trainer | 1915 | 1927 | Single-engined piston biplane |
| Curtiss Model L | US | Propeller | Trainer | 1916 | | Single-engined piston triplane |
| Curtiss Model N | US | Propeller | Trainer | 1915 | | Single-engined piston biplane floatplane |
| Curtiss Model R | US | Propeller | Utility | 1915 | | Single-engined piston biplane |
| Curtiss Model S | US | Propeller | Fighter | 1917 | | Single-engined piston triplane; evaluated but not accepted |
| Dorand AR | France | Propeller | Reconnaissance | 1917 | | Single-engined piston biplane |
| Farman F.40 | France | Propeller | Reconnaissance | 1915 | | Single-engined piston biplane |
| Farman F.50 | France | Propeller | Bomber | 1918 | | Two-engined piston biplane |
| LWF model V | US | Propeller | Trainer/reconnaissance | 1916 | | Single-engined piston biplane |
| Martin R | US | Propeller | Reconnaissance | 1916 | | |
| Martin S | US | Propeller | Reconnaissance | 1915 | | Single-engined piston biplane floatplane |
| Morane-Saulnier AI | France | Propeller | Trainer | 1917 | | Single-engined piston parasol monoplane |
| Morane-Saulnier P | France | Propeller | Reconnaissance | 1914 | | Single-engined piston parasol monoplane |
| Nieuport 10 | France | Propeller | Trainer | 1915 | | Single-engined piston biplane |
| Nieuport 11 | France | Propeller | Trainer | 1916 | | Single-engined piston biplane |
| Nieuport 12 | France | Propeller | Trainer | 1915 | | Single-engined piston biplane |
| Nieuport 17 | France | Propeller | Trainer | 1916 | | Single-engined piston biplane |
| Nieuport 21 | France | Propeller | Trainer | | | Single-engined piston biplane |
| Nieuport 23 | France | Propeller | Trainer | | | Single-engined piston biplane |
| Nieuport 24 | France | Propeller | Trainer | | | Single-engined piston biplane |
| Nieuport 27 | France | Propeller | Trainer | | | Single-engined piston biplane |
| Nieuport 28 | France | Propeller | Trainer | | | Single-engined piston biplane |
| Nieuport 80 | France | Propeller | Trainer | | | Single-engined piston biplane |
| Nieuport 81 | France | Propeller | Trainer | | | Single-engined piston biplane |
| Nieuport 83 | France | Propeller | Trainer | | | Single-engined piston biplane |
| Royal Aircraft Factory B.E.2 | UK | Propeller | | | | Single-engined piston biplane |
| Royal Aircraft Factory F.E.2 | UK | Propeller | | | | Single-engined piston biplane |
| Royal Aircraft Factory S.E.5 | UK | Propeller | Fighter | | | Single-engined piston biplane |
| Salmson 2 | France | Propeller | Trainer/reconnaissance | 1918 | | Single-engined piston biplane |
| SIA 7 | Italy | Propeller | Bomber/reconnaissance | 1917 | | Single-engined piston biplane |
| Sopwith Camel | UK | Propeller | Fighter | | | Single-engined piston biplane |
| Sopwith Dolphin | UK | Propeller | Fighter | | | Single-engined piston biplane |
| Sopwith SOP.1 | France | Propeller | Trainer | | | Single-engined piston biplane; French license-built Sopwith 1½ Strutter |
| SPAD S.VII | France | Propeller | Trainer | 1917 | | Single-engined piston biplane |
| SPAD S.XI | France | Propeller | Trainer | | | Single-engined piston biplane |
| SPAD S.XIII | France | Propeller | Fighter | 1918 | | Single-engined piston biplane |
| SPAD S.XVI | France | Propeller | Trainer | | | Single-engined piston biplane |
| Standard H-2 | US | Propeller | Trainer | 1916 | | Single-engined piston biplane |
| Standard J | US | Propeller | Trainer | 1916 | | Single-engined piston biplane |
| Sturtevant S | US | Propeller | Trainer/reconnaissance | 1916 | | Single-engined piston biplane |
| Thomas D-5 | US | Propeller | Trainer | 1915 | | |
| Voisin VIII | France | Propeller | Trainer | | | Single-engined piston biplane |
| Voisin X | France | Propeller | Trainer | 1919 | | Single-engined piston biplane |
| Wright Model A | US | Propeller | Trainer | 1909 | 1911 | Single-engined piston biplane |
| Wright Model B | US | Propeller | Trainer/reconnaissance | 1911 | 1914 | Single-engined piston biplane |
| Wright Model C | US | Propeller | Scout | 1912 | 1914 | Single-engined piston biplane |
| Wright Model D | US | Propeller | Reconnaissance | 1912 | 1914 | Single-engined piston biplane |

== Air Force ==
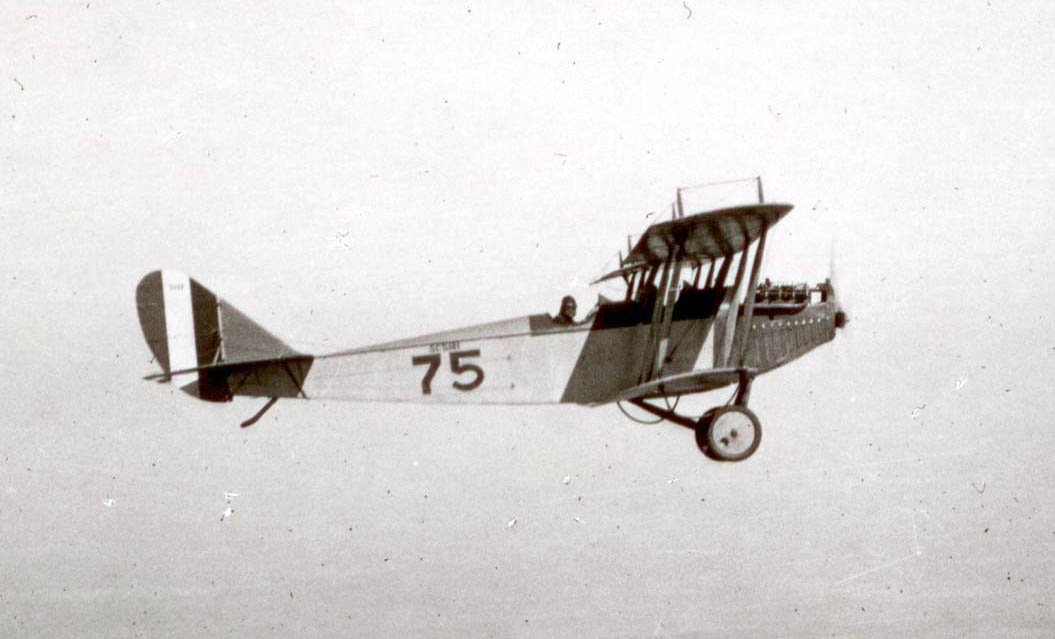
A Curtiss JN-4 Jenny, one of the most widely used US Army Air Service aircraft of the World War I era

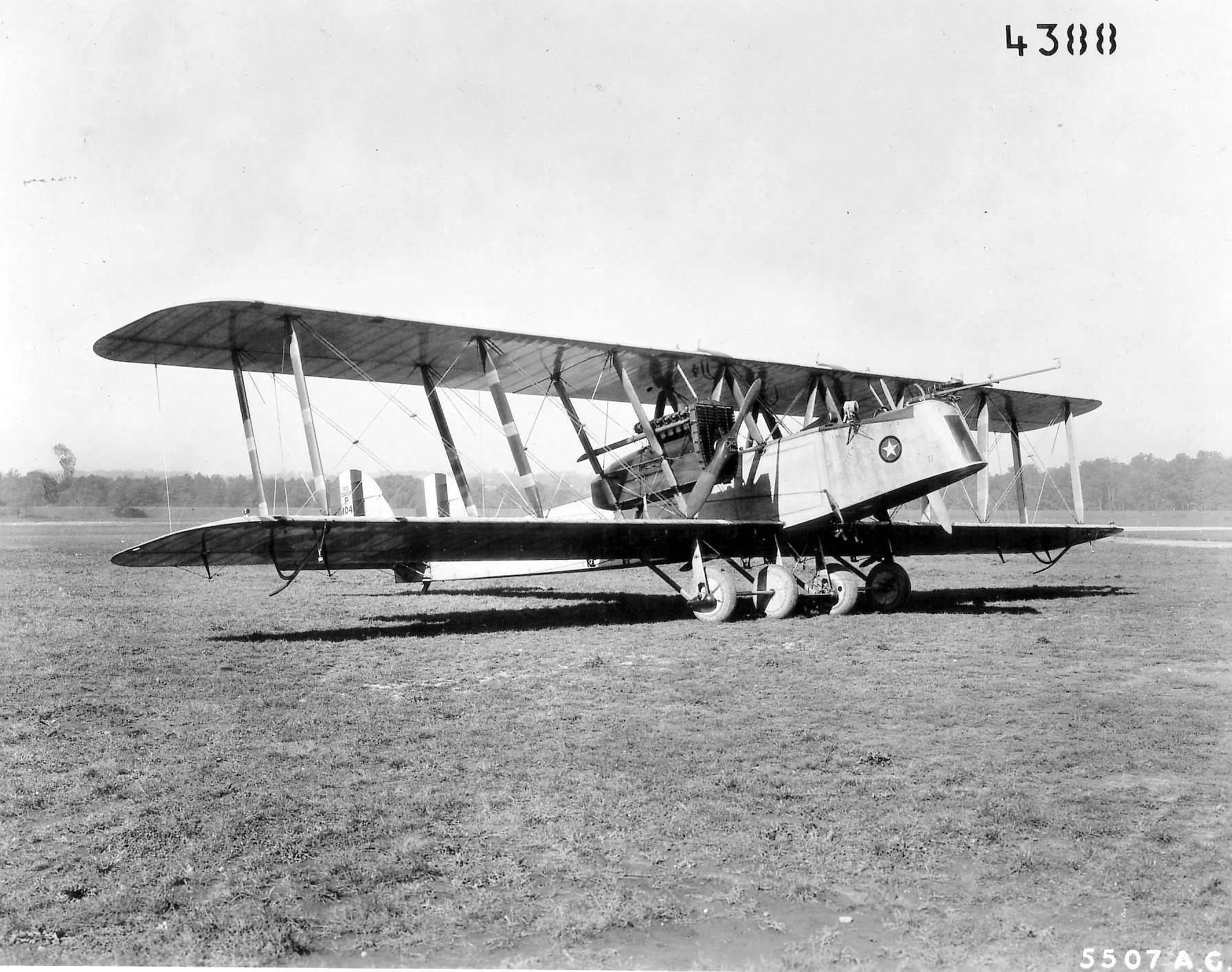
A US Army Air Service Martin GMB bomber, the first purpose-built American bomber aircraft

This list includes aircraft operated by the United States Air Force and its predecessors: the United States Army Air Service (USAAS), United States Army Air Corps (USAAC), and United States Army Air Forces (USAAF).

| Type | Origin | Class | Role | Introduced | Retired | Notes |
|---|---|---|---|---|---|---|
| Airspeed Oxford | UK | Propeller | Trainer | 1942 | 1945 | Two-engined piston monoplane; operated by US units in conjunction with UK Royal Air Force |
| Albree Pigeon-Fraser | US | Propeller | Fighter | 1918 | | Single-engined piston monoplane |
| Antonov An-28 | Ukraine | Propeller | Transport | | | Two-engined turboprop monoplane |
| Avro Anson | UK | Propeller | Transport | 1942 | 1945 | Two-engined piston monoplane; operated by US units in conjunction with UK Royal Air Force. Canadian built Ansons operated as AT-20 |
| Boeing Model 4 | US | Propeller | Trainer | 1918 | | Single-engined piston biplane with floats |
| Consolidated LB-30 | US | Propeller | Bomber | 1941 | | Four-engined piston monoplane; UK Liberator B Mk II aircraft requisitioned by USAAF and operated under company designation rather than as B-24 |
| Curtiss 18 | US | Propeller | Fighter | 1918 | | Single-engined piston biplane |
| C-class blimp | US | Airship | Patrol | 1921 | | Two-engined piston blimp; two aircraft transferred from US Navy |
| Curtiss Model JN | US | Propeller | Trainer | 1918 | 1927 | Single-engined piston biplane |
| Curtiss Model R | US | Propeller | Utility | 1918 | | Single-engined piston biplane |
| D-class blimp | US | Airship | Patrol | 1921 | | Two-engined piston blimp; four aircraft transferred from US Navy |
| Dayton-Wright/Fisher DH-4 | US | Propeller | Bomber | 1918 | 1932 | Single-engined piston biplane; license-built variant of the Airco DH.4 |
| de Havilland Dominie | UK | Propeller | Transport | 1942 | 1945 | Two-engined piston biplane; operated by US units in conjunction with UK Royal Air Force |
| de Havilland Mosquito | UK | Propeller | Bomber | 1942 | 1945 | Two-engined piston monoplane; operated by US units in conjunction with UK Royal Air Force |
| de Havilland Tiger Moth | UK | Propeller | Trainer | 1942 | 1945 | Single-engined piston biplane; operated by US units in conjunction with UK Royal Air Force |
| Douglas Boston | US | Propeller | Bomber | 1942 | 1945 | Two-engined piston monoplane; UK version of Douglas A-20 operated in conjunction with UK Royal Air Force |
| Engineering Division USB-1 | US | Propeller | Fighter | 1918 | | Single-engined piston biplane; license-built variant of the Bristol F.2 |
| Engineering Division USB-2 | US | Propeller | Fighter | 1918 | | Single-engined piston biplane; license-built variant of the Bristol F.2 |
| Engineering Division USD-9 | US | Propeller | Bomber | | | Single-engined piston biplane; license-built variant of the Airco DH.9 |
| Engineering Division XB-1 | US | Propeller | Reconnaissance | | | Single-engined piston biplane; license-built variant of the Bristol F.2 |
| Fokker D.VII | Germany | Propeller | Trainer | 1918 | | Single-engined piston biplane; obtained as German war reparations, some transferred to US Navy |
| Hawker Hurricane | UK | Propeller | Fighter | 1942 | 1945 | Single-engined piston monoplane; operated by US units in conjunction with UK Royal Air Force |
| Heinkel HD 22 | Germany | Propeller | Utility | 1930 | | Single-engined piston biplane; one purchased for US Military Attaché in Germany |
| Heinrich Pursuit | US | Propeller | Fighter | 1918 | | Single-engined piston biplane |
| LWF model V | US | Propeller | Trainer/reconnaissance | 1918 | | Single-engined piston biplane |
| Martin GMB | US | Propeller | Bomber | 1918 | | Two-engined piston biplane |
| Mil Mi-171 | Russia | Rotorcraft | Transport | | | Two-engined turboshaft helicopter |
| Miles Master | UK | Propeller | Trainer/reconnaissance | 1942 | 1945 | Single-engined piston monoplane; operated by US units in conjunction with UK Royal Air Force |
| Morane-Saulnier MS-234 | France | Propeller | Utility | 1932 | 1935 | Single-engined piston biplane; one purchased for US Military Attaché in Paris |
| Orenco D | US | Propeller | Fighter | 1919 | | Single-engined piston biplane; also built by Curtiss |
| Packard-Le Père LUSAC-11 | US | Propeller | Fighter | 1918 | | Single-engined piston biplane |
| Royal Aircraft Factory S.E.5 | UK | Propeller | Fighter | 1918 | | Single-engined piston biplane |
| Supermarine Spitfire | UK | Propeller | Fighter | 1942 | 1945 | Single-engined piston monoplane; operated by US units in conjunction with UK Royal Air Force |
| Verville VCP | US | Propeller | Fighter/racer | 1920 | | Single-engined piston biplane; later variants designated PW-1 and R-1 |
| Vought VE-7 | US | Propeller | Fighter/trainer | 1918 | | Single-engined piston biplane |
| Vought VE-8 | US | Propeller | Fighter/trainer | 1918 | | Single-engined piston biplane |
| Vought VE-9 | US | Propeller | Fighter/trainer | 1927 | | Single-engined piston biplane; improved VE-7 |

== Navy, Marine Corps and Coast Guard ==
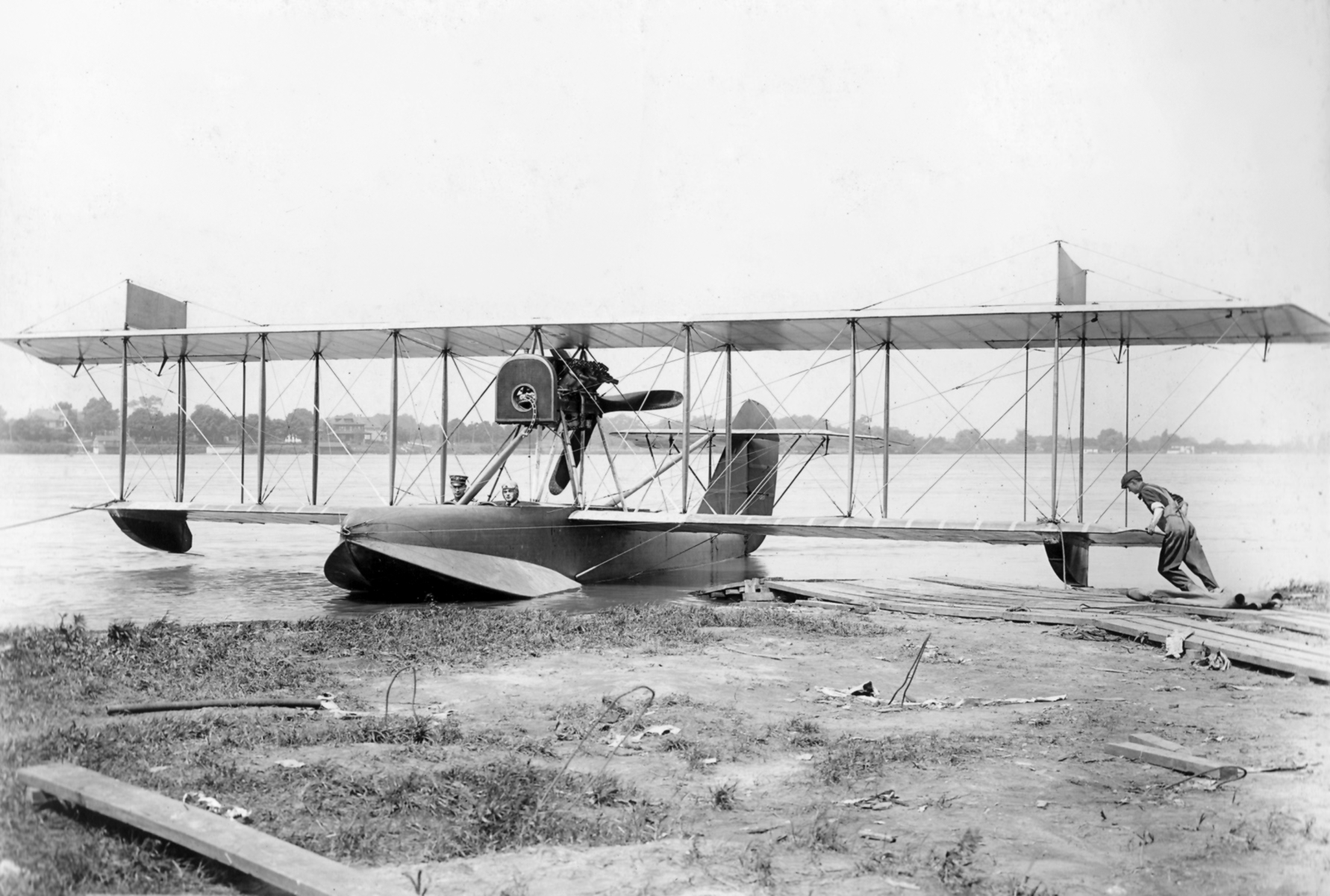
A beached US Navy Curtiss HS flying boat, circa 1917. Built in large numbers, the HS first saw service in World War I.

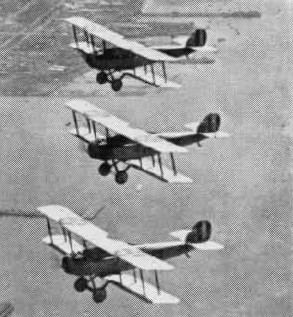
A trio of US Navy Vought VE-7s in flight, circa 1920s

This list includes aircraft operated by the United States Navy, United States Marine Corps and United States Coast Guard.

Aviation in the Marine Corps and Coast Guard has historically been subsidiary to naval aviation, with Marine Corps aircraft being procured by the Navy. Many Coast Guard aircraft have been procured from the Navy or the Air Force and its predecessors, typically carrying designations conforming to equivalent types operated by those services, but the Coast Guard has also independently obtained several aircraft types without a military designation or an equivalent.

The Navy's rigid airships were commissioned as warships and given hull classification symbols, but many of its other lighter-than-air craft never received formal designations. Until the 1940s, Navy blimps were grouped into classes by nominal power and size; within each class, individual aircraft often had significant design variations, and were sometimes sourced from different manufacturers. Spherical crewed free gas balloons used for airship crew training were considered ZF-class aircraft but categorically never received formal designations and were identified only by serial number and volume; similarly, crewed kite balloons and uncrewed barrage balloons were considered ZK-class, but were undesignated.

| Type | Origin | Class | Role | Introduced | Retired | Notes |
|---|---|---|---|---|---|---|
| Aeromarine AS | US | Propeller | Scout | 1917 | | Single-engined piston biplane floatplane |
| Aeromarine 39 | US | Propeller | Trainer | 1917 | | Single-engined piston biplane floatplane |
| Aeromarine 40 | US | Propeller | Trainer | 1918 | | Single-engined piston flying boat |
| Aeromarine 700 | US | Propeller | Torpedo bomber | 1917 | | Single-engined piston biplane floatplane |
| B-class blimp | US | Airship | Patrol | 1917 | | Single-engined piston blimp |
| Blackburn Swift | UK | Propeller | Torpedo bomber | 1921 | | Single-engined piston biplane; two purchased for evaluation |
| Boeing B-314 | US | Propeller | Transport | 1942 | 1945 | Four-engined piston monoplane flying boat; impressed from Pan Am, Army designation of C-98 disregarded |
| Bristol Bulldog | UK | Propeller | Fighter | 1929 | | Single-engined piston biplane; two purchased for evaluation |
| C-class blimp | US | Airship | Patrol | 1918 | | Two-engined piston blimp |
| Caproni Ca.44 | Italy | Propeller | Bomber | 1918 | | Three-engined piston bomber |
| Caspar U.1 | Germany | Propeller | Scout | 1922 | | Single-engined piston biplane floatplane; two purchased for evaluation, not accepted for service |
| Consolidated 21-A | US | Propeller | Trainer | 1931 | 1941 | Single-engined piston biplane; single aircraft transferred from USAAC to Coast Guard, later designated N4Y-1 |
| Curtiss-Cox Cactus Kitten | US | Propeller | Racer | 1922 | | Single-engined piston triplane; single aircraft purchased from civil owner |
| Curtiss 18 | US | Propeller | Fighter/racer | 1918 | 1923 | Single-engined piston biplane |
| Curtiss F-5L | US | Propeller | Patrol | 1918 | | Two-engined piston biplane flying boat; evolution of RNAS Felixstowe design, later designated PN |
| Curtiss H | US | Propeller | Patrol | 1916 | 1928 | Two-engined piston biplane flying boat |
| Curtiss HA | US | Propeller | Fighter | 1918 | | Single-engined piston biplane; none ordered, but test aircraft were retained by Navy |
| Curtiss HS | US | Propeller | Patrol | 1917 | | Single-engined piston biplane flying boat |
| Curtiss JN | US | Propeller | Trainer | 1917 | 1926 | Single-engined piston biplane |
| Curtiss Model MF | US | Propeller | Patrol | 1918 | | Single-engined piston biplane flying boat |
| Curtiss NC | US | Propeller | Patrol | 1918 | | Four-engined piston biplane flying boat |
| Curtiss N-9 | US | Propeller | Reconnaissance/trainer | 1917 | 1926 | Single-engined piston biplane floatplane |
| Curtiss Model R | US | Propeller | Scout/trainer | 1918 | | Single-engined piston biplane; some operated as floatplanes, some used for torpedo bombing trials |
| D-class blimp | US | Airship | Patrol | 1919 | 1921 | Two-engined piston blimp; transferred to US Army |
| DN-1 | US | Airship | Patrol | 1916 | 1917 | Two-engined piston blimp; single aircraft, retroactively considered the A-class blimp |
| de Havilland DH.9A | UK | Propeller | Bomber | 1918 | | Single-engined piston biplane |
| Detroit ZMC-2 | US | Airship | Patrol | 1929 | 1941 | Two-engined piston blimp; single aircraft |
| Donnet-Denhaut flying boat | France | Propeller | Patrol | 1918 | | Single-engined piston biplane flying boat |
| Dornier CsII | Germany | Propeller | Experimental | 1920 | | Single-engined piston monoplane flying boat; one purchased to study its metal construction |
| Douglas D-558-1 Skystreak | US | Jet | Experimental | 1947 | 1953 | Single-engined jet monoplane; high-speed research aircraft operated in conjunction with NACA |
| Douglas D-558-2 Skyrocket | US | Jet/rocket | Experimental | 1948 | 1956 | Hybrid jet/rocket monoplane; high-speed research aircraft operated in conjunction with NACA |
| E-class blimp | US | Airship | Patrol | 1919 | 1924 | Single-engined piston blimp; single aircraft |
| F-class blimp | US | Airship | Patrol | 1919 | 1923 | Single-engined piston blimp; single aircraft |
| FBA 17HT4 | France | Propeller | Trainer | 1931 | | Single-engined piston biplane flying boat; one Schreck-built aircraft purchased by Coast Guard, later license-built in US as Viking OO-1 |
| FBA Type H | France/Italy | Propeller | Patrol | 1918 | | Single-engined piston biplane flying boat |
| Fokker C.I | Netherlands | Propeller | | 1921 | | Single-engined piston biplane; three purchased for Marine Corps, originally built in 1918 for Germany but never delivered |
| Fokker D.VII | Germany | Propeller | Trainer | 1918 | 1924 | Single-engined piston biplane; German war reparations transferred from US Army |
| Franklin PS-2 | US | Glider | Trainer | 1930s? | | Monoplane glider |
| Gallaudet D-1 | US | Propeller | Experimental | 1918 | 1918 | Two-engined piston biplane floatplane |
| Gallaudet D-4 | US | Propeller | Experimental | 1918 | 1918 | Single-engined piston biplane floatplane; development of Gallaudet D-1 |
| G-class blimp | US | Airship | Patrol/trainer | 1935 | 1959 | Two-engined piston blimp; later designated ZNN-G |
| General Aviation FLB | US | Propeller | Search and rescue | 1932 | | Two-engined piston monoplane flying boat; operated only by Coast Guard, later designated PJ |
| H-class blimp | US | Airship | Patrol/trainer | 1921 | 1921 | Single-engined piston blimp |
| Hanriot HD.1 | France | Propeller | Fighter | 1918 | | Single-engined piston biplane; landplane conversions from HD.2 floatplanes |
| Hanriot HD.2 | France | Propeller | Fighter | 1918 | | Single-engined piston biplane floatplane |
| J-class blimp | US | Airship | Patrol/trainer | 1922 | 1940 | Two-engined piston blimp |
| Junkers-Larsen JL-6 | Germany | Propeller | Experimental | 1920? | | Single-engined piston monoplane floatplane; three purchased for evaluation |
| K-class blimp | US | Airship | Patrol/trainer | 1931 | | Two-engined piston blimp; first aircraft (K-1) differed substantially from others; later designated ZNP-K |
| L-class blimp | US | Airship | Trainer | 1937 | | Two-engined piston blimp; later designated ZNN-L |
| Levy-Lepen HB2 | France | Propeller | Patrol | 1918 | | Single-engined piston biplane flying boat |
| Loening LS | US | Propeller | Reconnaissance/racer | 1918 | | Single-engined piston monoplane; floatplane version of Loening M-8 |
| Loening M-8 | US | Propeller | Reconnaissance/racer | 1918 | | Single-engined piston monoplane |
| Macchi M.5 | Italy | Propeller | Fighter | 1918 | | Single-engined piston biplane flying boat |
| Macchi M.16 | Italy | Propeller | Scout | 1922 | | Single-engined piston biplane floatplane; three purchased for evaluation, not accepted for service |
| Martin M-130 | US | Propeller | Transport | 1942 | 1945 | Four-engined piston monoplane flying boat; impressed from Pan Am |
| Morane-Saulnier AR-1 | France | Propeller | Trainer | 1921 | | Single-engined piston parasol monoplane |
| Naval Aircraft Factory N-1 | US | Propeller | Patrol | 1918 | 1918 | Single-engined piston biplane floatplane |
| Naval Aircraft Factory PT | US | Propeller | Torpedo bomber | 1922 | | Single-engined piston biplane floatplane; built largely from Curtiss HS and R-6 spare parts |
| Naval Aircraft Factory SA | US | Propeller | Scout | 1919 | 1919 | Single-engined piston monoplane |
| Naval Aircraft Factory TF | US | Propeller | Fighter | 1918 | 1923 | Two-engined piston biplane flying boat |
| Naval Aircraft Factory TG | US | Propeller | Trainer | 1922 | | Single-engined piston biplane floatplane |
| Naval Aircraft Factory TS | US | Propeller | Fighter | 1922 | | Single-engined piston biplane; some operated as floatplanes, later designated F4C |
| Nieuport 28 | France | Propeller | Experimental | 1919 | | Single-engined piston biplane; transferred after WWI from US Army and used for ship platform launching trials |
| NS class airship | UK | Airship | Patrol | 1918 | | Two-engined piston blimp; single aircraft |
| O-1 | Italy | Airship | Experimental | 1919 | 1921–1922? | Two-engined piston airship; single aircraft |
| Parnall Panther | UK | Propeller | Fighter | 1919 | | Single-engined piston biplane |
| Romeo Ro.1 | Italy | Propeller | Utility | 1928 | | Single-engined piston biplane; one purchased for US Naval Attaché in Rome |
| Royal Aircraft Factory S.E.5A | UK | Propeller | Fighter | 1918 | | Single-engined piston biplane |
| RRG Prüfling | Germany | Glider | Experimental | 1930? | | Monoplane glider; one purchased from US civil flight school for airship launch tests conducted in early 1930 |
| Seversky NF-1 | US | Propeller | Fighter | 1935 | | Single-engined piston monoplane; none ordered, but the test aircraft was retained by the Navy; called FN-1 by some sources |
| Sopwith Baby | UK | Propeller | Scout | 1917 | 1918 | Single-engined piston biplane floatplane; at least seven evaluated, not accepted for service |
| Sopwith Camel | UK | Propeller | Fighter | 1917 | | Single-engined piston biplane |
| Sopwith 1½ Strutter | UK | Propeller | Reconnaissance | 1918 | | Single-engined piston biplane |
| SS class airship | UK | Airship | Patrol | 1918 | | Single-engined piston blimp |
| SST class airship | UK | Airship | Patrol | 1918 | | Two-engined piston blimp; single aircraft |
| SSZ class airship | UK | Airship | Patrol | 1918 | | Single-engined piston blimp |
| TC-class blimp | US | Airship | Patrol | 1938 | 1943 | Two-engined piston blimp; two aircraft transferred from US Army, never given naval designations |
| Tellier flying boat | France | Propeller | Patrol | 1917 | | Single-engined piston biplane flying boat |
| Thomas-Morse MB-3 | US | Propeller | Trainer | 1921 | | Single-engined piston biplane; transferred from US Army for use by Marine Corps |
| Thomas-Morse S-4 | US | Propeller | Trainer | 1917 | | Single-engined piston biplane |
| Thomas-Morse S-5 | US | Propeller | Scout | 1917 | | Single-engined piston biplane; diverted from US Army S-4 order and refitted as floatplanes |
| Thomas-Morse SH-4 | US | Propeller | Reconnaissance/trainer | 1917 | | Single-engined piston biplane floatplane |
| Vickers Viking | US | Propeller | Experimental | 1921 | | Single-engined piston biplane amphibian |
| Vought VE-7 | US | Propeller | Fighter/trainer | 1918 | | Single-engined piston biplane; some operated as floatplanes |
| Vought VE-9 | US | Propeller | Reconnaissance | 1918 | | Single-engined piston biplane; some operated as floatplanes |

== See also ==
- United States military aircraft designation systems
- List of active United States military aircraft
- List of military aircraft of the United States
- List of United States Navy aircraft designations (pre-1962)
- List of U.S. DoD aircraft designations
- United States military aircraft engine designations
- United States military aircraft serials
