= Aeromarine 50 =

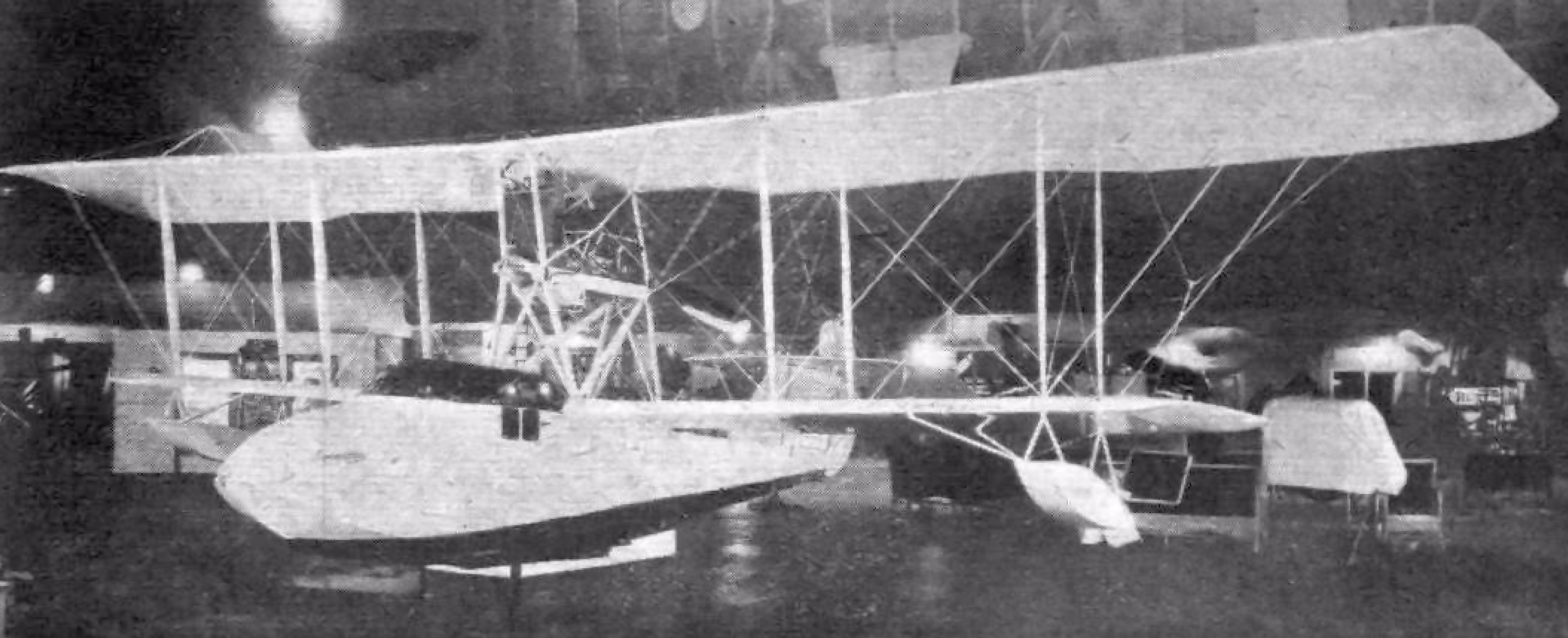

General information
- Type: Seaplane
- National origin: United States
- Manufacturer: Aeromarine

History
- Introduction date: Chicago Air Show
- First flight: 1919
- Developed from: Aeromarine 40

The Aeromarine 50, also called the Limousine Flying Boat, was a luxury seaplane.

== Design and development ==
After the First World War, Aeromarine had completed over 300 aircraft. Production was centered on seaplanes for sport and commercial use. President Inglis M. Uppercu, marketed the seaplane based in its luxury interior.

The aircraft was a biplane seaplane with a two-pilot open cockpit and enclosed seating for three passengers. The engine was mounted in a pusher configuration.

== Operational history ==
One Aeromarine 50 was purchased by Aero Limited for New York-Atlantic City flights. Aeromarine Airways also operated Model 50 flying boats.

== Variants ==
Aeromarine 50B
Fully enclosed variant
Aeromarine 50C
150 hp (112 kW) Hispano Suiza powered version
Aeromarine 50 "S"
a commercial passenger variant.

== Specifications (Aeromarine 50) ==
Data from Mississippi Valley Magazine

General characteristics

- Crew: 2
- Capacity: 3
- Upper wingspan: 48 ft 6 in (14.78 m)
- Lower wingspan: 37 ft 8 in (11.48 m)
- Height: 12 ft 7 in (3.84 m)
- Empty weight: 2,280 lb (1,034 kg)
- Gross weight: 3,000 lb (1,361 kg)
- Fuel capacity: 40 U.S. gallons (150 L; 33 imp gal)
- Powerplant: 1 × Aeromarine V-8 , 130 hp (97 kW)

Performance

- Maximum speed: 65 kn (75 mph, 121 km/h)
- Stall speed: 38 kn (44 mph, 71 km/h)
- Endurance: 3.5 hr
- Rate of climb: 220 ft/min (1.1 m/s)
