= Model 60 =

Model 60 may refer to:

== Aircraft ==
- Aeromarine Model 60, a twin-engine seaplane introduced in 1923
- Beech Model 60 Duke, pressurized, twin-engined piston aircraft introduced in 1968
- Lockheed Model 60, alternative name for the Aermacchi AL-60, a civil utility aircraft produced by Lockheed-Azcarate

== Firearms ==
- Marlin Model 60, a semi-automatic rifle produced by Remington Arms
- Smith & Wesson Model 60, a service revolver
- Smith & Wesson Model 60 LadySmith, a small-frame revolver

== Other ==
- Dana/Spicer Model 60, an automotive axle
- IBM PS/2 Model 60, a midrange member of the PS/2 family of personal computers
- IBM Series III Model 60, a model of photocopier
- Model 60 stacking stool, a wooden stool designed by Alvar Aalto
- SME Model 60, a model of high-end turntable
- VAXstation 4000 Model 60, a workstation computer produced by Digital Equipment Corporation

== See also ==
- M60 (disambiguation)
