= Aeromarine EO =

General information
- Type: Seaplane
- National origin: United States
- Manufacturer: Aeromarine Plane and Motor Company
- Number built: 1

History
- First flight: June 1924
- Developed from: Aeromarine AMC

The Aeromarine EO was a light sport flying boat that was built in the mid-1920s.

== Design and development ==
The Aeromarine EO was designed as an updated replacement of the Aeromarine Model 44 for the customer Earl Dodge Osborn. Osborn was a former accountant for Aeromarine, assistant editor of Aviation magazine and future founder of Edo Aircraft Corporation. The aluminum hull was scaled down from the Aeromarine AMC design, offering advantages in durability, weight and the inability to become waterlogged.

The EO was an open-cockpit aluminum-hulled biplane seaplane with a single tractor engine center mounted in a nacelle on the top wing which also housed the fuel tank and oil tank. The upper wing was staggered well forward of the lower wing. The wings were constructed with spruce I-beam spars and ribs with aircraft fabric covering. The hull was built with four watertight compartments. The tip floats were all-aluminum. A cross-through tube accepted a wheel assembly for ground movement.

== Operational history ==
The first flight tests were performed by Osborn in June 1924. The sole EO was used for demonstration flights for the EDO company. It then transferred ownership several times with a planned flight to Puerto Rico. It was listed as "Washed Out" at Cape May, New Jersey and its registration was cancelled on 21 January 1932.

== Specifications (Aeromarine EO) ==
Data from Skyways

General characteristics

- Crew: 1
- Capacity: 2
- Length: 25 ft 2 in (7.67 m)
- Upper wingspan: 38 ft (12 m)
- Lower wingspan: 34 ft (10 m)
- Height: 8 ft 7 in (2.62 m)
- Wing area: 145 sq ft (13.5 m^{2})
- Airfoil: Aeromarine Nbr. 2a upper, Aeromarine Nbr. 6 lower
- Empty weight: 1,040 lb (472 kg)
- Gross weight: 1,750 lb (794 kg)
- Fuel capacity: 25 U.S. gallons (95 L; 21 imp gal)
- Powerplant: 1 × Anzani 6.A.3 Double row radial, 80 hp (60 kW)

Performance

- Maximum speed: 65 kn (75 mph, 121 km/h)
- Stall speed: 30 kn (35 mph, 56 km/h)
- Endurance: 4 hours
- Service ceiling: 16,500 ft (5,000 m)
- Rate of climb: 280 ft/min (1.4 m/s)
- Wing loading: 6.58 lb/sq ft (32.1 kg/m^{2})
