= Aeromarine West Indies Airways =

US airline (1920–1924)

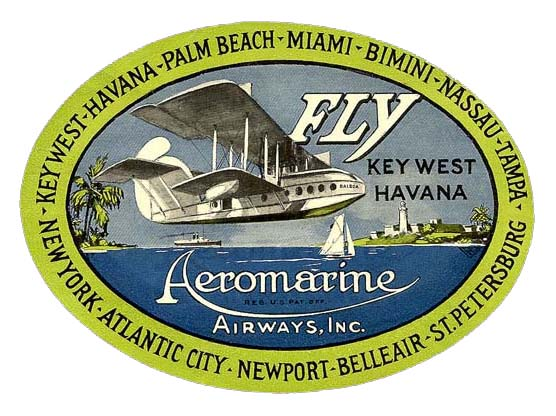
- Baggage label 1921, designed by Harry Bruno at Sloppy Joe's Bar, Havana.
- Founded: 1920; 106 years ago
- Ceased operations: 1924; 102 years ago
- Key people: Inglis Moore Uppercu; Harry Bruno; Ed Musick

Aeromarine West Indies Airways
- Founded: 2007; 19 years ago

Aeromarine West Indies Airways was a United States airline that operated from 1920 to 1924. It was reorganized as Aeromarine Airways in 1921.

A new Aeromarine West Indies Airways was incorporated in 2007.

== Original airline ==
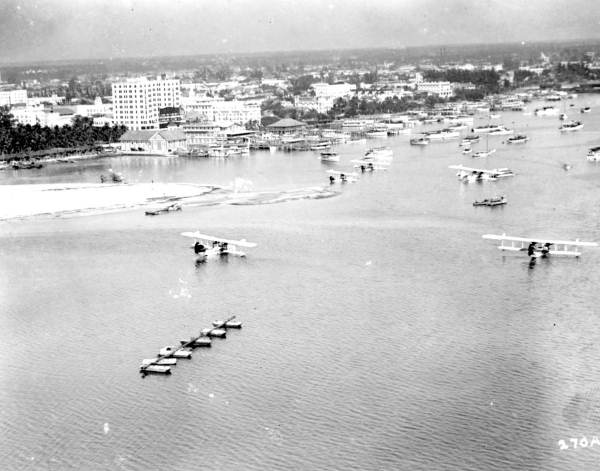
Five of the fleet of six Aeromarine 75 flying boats moored at Biscayne Bay, Miami, in the spring of 1922

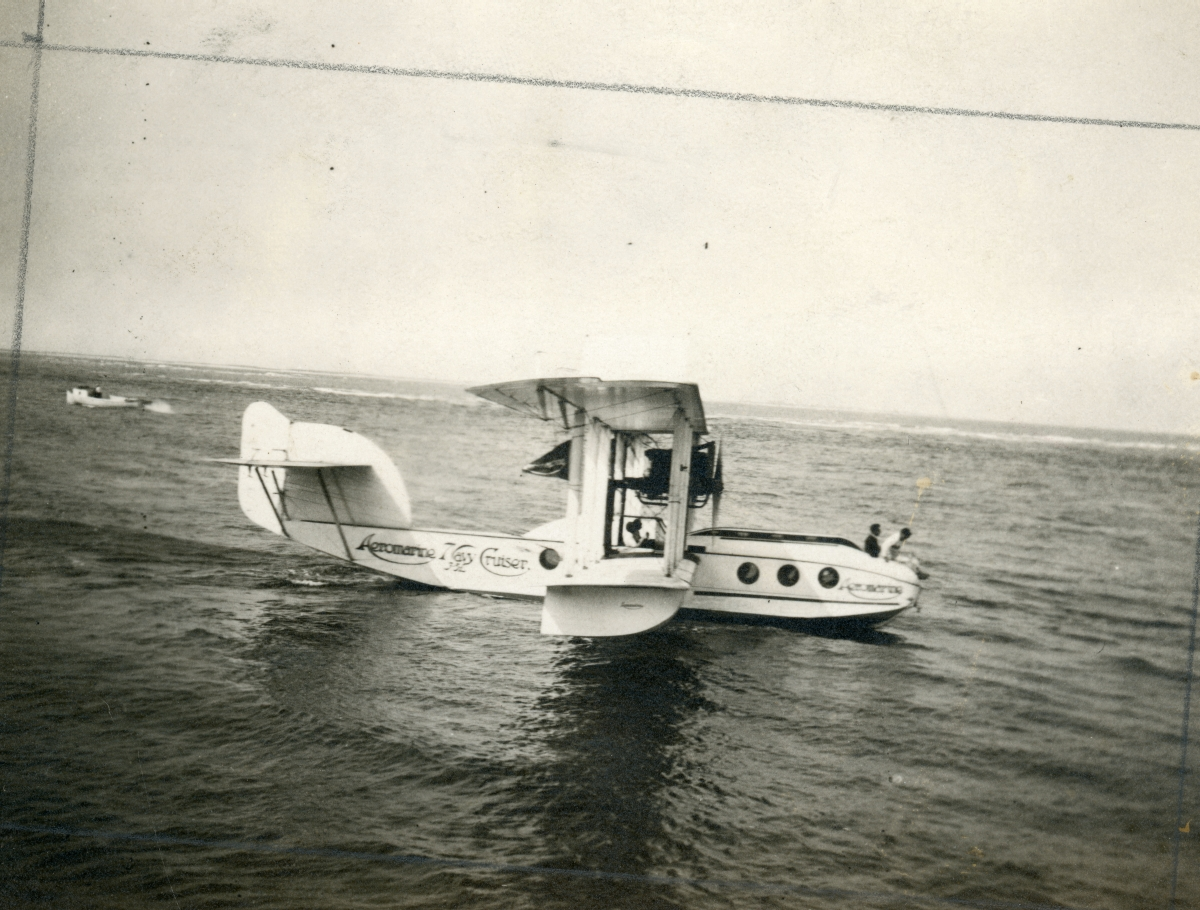
Aeromarine 75 flying boat, 1920

The original company was formed by a merger between Florida West Indies Airways and Aeromarine Sightseeing and Navigation Company (a subsidiary of the Aeromarine airplane manufacturing company) and was one of the first international airlines in the United States. It commenced operations on 1 November 1920 with a flight from Key West, Florida, to Havana, Cuba, and operated flying boats from the United States mainland to the Bahamas and Cuba. Transporting passengers, mail, and freight beginning in 1921, it ceased operations in early 1924 due to a freeze on mail contracts by the United States Post Office.

It was reorganized as Aeromarine Airways in spring of 1921 with Inglis Moore Uppercu, a New York City Cadillac dealer as its president. Aeromarine enjoyed many firsts - the first U.S. international air mail service and first scheduled U.S. international passenger service (Key West to Havana, November 1, 1920); first total-service U.S. airline (passenger, mail, express cargo); first in-flight movie (Chicago, August 1921); first airline baggage label (1921); and the first U.S. airline ticket office (Cleveland, July 1922). Its slogan was "Speed Safety Comfort". The overseas flights in Felixstowe F5L flying boats named the Nina, Pinta, and Santa Maria brought passengers to popular destinations that still allowed drinking at the start of Prohibition. The new metal-hulled, six-passenger Aeromarine AMC was placed into service in 1924 but operated for only a short time before service ceased.

== New airline ==
The "rebirth" of Aeromarine West Indies Airways occurred in February 2007 when it was reformed and incorporated in the State of Florida, Aeromarine West Indies Airways Corporation has applied for its FAA Part 121 Air Carrier Certificate intending to begin operations, flying vintage flying boats and/or propliners, by 2012. Aeromarine's first intended route was from St. Augustine, Florida, to Palm Beach, Florida, to Key West. In January 2009 the airline purchased a 1920s-style coastal steamship, the CSS (Coastal Steam Ship) Seminole Wind, intending to base her in St. Augustine and use her as a floating terminal and tender for seaplane operations. Plans are also underway to open a cafe and shops on board the Seminole Wind to be open to the general public. Aeromarine's tag-line is: "Aeromarine West Indies Airways... The return of an airline that offers the romance and adventure of a bygone age!"

== Accidents and incidents ==
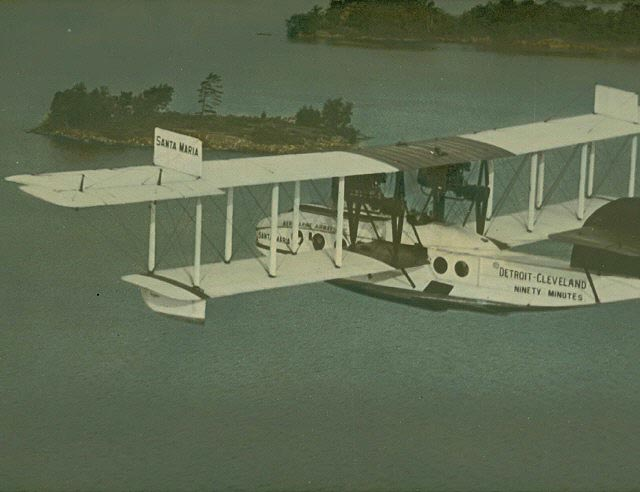
Santa Maria, the most well known and utilised of Aeromarine’s aircraft, flying over the Lake Erie Islands, summer 1922.

On 13 January 1923, the Aeromarine Airways Aeromarine 75 Columbus suffered engine failure during a flight from Key West to Havana and landed in the Florida Strait. Buffeted by 10-to-15-foot (3-to-4.5-meter) waves, its hull began to fill with water. Four passengers died, but the ferry ship H. M. Flagler saved the other three passengers and both crew members.

== See also ==
- List of defunct airlines of the United States
