= Aeromarine BM-1 =

BM-1

General information
- Type: Mail plane
- National origin: United States
- Manufacturer: Aeromarine
- Designer: Boris v. Korvin-Kroukovsky
- Status: Design stage only
- Number built: none

The Aeromarine BM-1 was a new mail plane design to meet a request for proposal by the US Postal Service in the 1920s.

== Design and development ==
Aeromarine developed the AM-1, AM-2, and AM-3 designs in 1923 for an earlier proposal. The BM-1 was a clean-sheet design for the new effort.

The BM-1 was a single place biplane with conventional landing gear and a steerable tail skid. The aircraft used a dropable main fuel tank between the main gear to meet crashworthiness requirements and a small header tank of 10 gallons in the upper wing. Control cables were designed not to use pulleys. The wings had optional metal or wood spars with doped aircraft fabric covering. The fuselage used an all-metal aluminum girder structure with aluminum covering. The horizontal stabilizer used a jack screw for trim adjustment. The engine featured a radiator mounted to the front with a pass-through for the propeller shaft.

The BM-1 did not progress beyond design phase.

== Specifications (Aeromarine BM-1) ==
Data from Skyways

General characteristics

- Crew: 1
- Length: 30 ft 6 in (9.30 m)
- Upper wingspan: 47 ft (14 m)
- Lower wingspan: 44 ft (13 m)
- Height: 11 ft (3.4 m)
- Wing area: 514 sq ft (47.8 m^{2})
- Airfoil: Aeromarine airfoil series 2a
- Empty weight: 2,822 lb (1,280 kg)
- Gross weight: 4,755 lb (2,157 kg)
- Fuel capacity: 100 U.S. gallons (380 L; 83 imp gal)
- Powerplant: 1 × Liberty 12 , 420 hp (310 kW)

Performance

- Maximum speed: 109 kn (125 mph, 201 km/h)
- Stall speed: 43 kn (50 mph, 80 km/h)
- Service ceiling: 17,000 ft (5,200 m)
- Rate of climb: 850 ft/min (4.3 m/s)

== See also ==
Related development

- Aeromarine AM-1
