= Aeromarine AM-1 =

AM
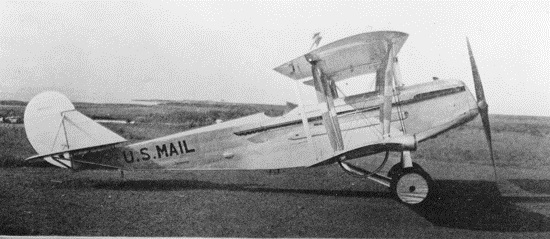
- AM-3

General information
- Type: Mail plane
- National origin: United States of America
- Manufacturer: Aeromarine
- Designer: Paul Zimmerman

History
- First flight: September 1923
- Developed from: Aeromarine AMC

The Aeromarine AM-1 was a biplane built to pursue a US Air Mail Service requirement for a nighttime transport.

== Design and development ==
The AM-1 was completed 122 days from the announcement of a 1924 requirement for a nighttime mail plane capable of hauling 300 lb (136 kg) of mail. The contest was lost to Douglas aircraft.

The AM-1 was a biplane with conventional landing gear. It featured an all-metal fuselage with metal covering .32 in (8.13 mm) thick. The engine was fully cowled with the exhaust stacks stretching behind the pilot. The water-cooled engine used a centrally mounted radiator mounted above the top wing for visibility. Two streamlined fuel tanks sat on top of the wings. The upper wing was larger than the lower wing, each using spruce spars. The tail surfaces were aluminum framed with fabric covering. Many components were common with the design of the Aeromarine AMC flying boat.

== Variants ==
Aeromarine AM-1
Base version
Aeromarine AM-2
A slight redesign to address nose drop with engine out, and drag. The aircraft was the same as an AM-1 except the radiator was relocated under the fuselage.
Aeromarine AM-3
Radiator moved to the front of the engine, tested with 350hp engine, found to be under-performing.

== Specifications (Aeromarine AM-1) ==
Data from Skyways

General characteristics

- Capacity: 1
- Length: 32 ft 11 in (10.03 m)
- Upper wingspan: 50 ft (15 m)
- Lower wingspan: 45 ft 10 in (13.97 m)
- Height: 12 ft 9 in (3.89 m)
- Wing area: 541 sq ft (50.3 m^{2})
- Airfoil: Aeromarine airfoil section 2A
- Empty weight: 2,875 lb (1,304 kg)
- Gross weight: 4,450 lb (2,018 kg)
- Fuel capacity: 100 US gallons (380 L; 83 imp gal)
- Powerplant: 1 × Liberty 12 12 cylinder, 400 hp (300 kW)
- Propellers: 2-bladed, 9 ft 6 in (2.90 m) diameter

Performance

- Maximum speed: 100 kn (115 mph, 185 km/h)
- Stall speed: 39 kn (45 mph, 72 km/h)
- Endurance: 3 hrs
- Service ceiling: 17,000 ft (5,200 m) service
- Rate of climb: 800 ft/min (4.1 m/s)
- Wing loading: 8.27 lb/sq ft (40.4 kg/m^{2})

== See also ==
Aircraft of comparable role, configuration, and era

- Curtiss Carrier Pigeon
