= Aeromarine PG-1 =

Pursuit and ground attack aircraft by Aeromarine

PG-1
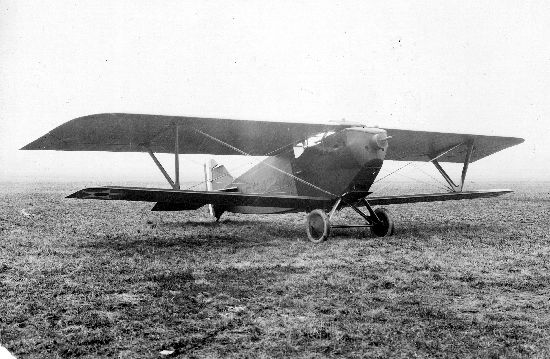

General information
- Type: Pursuit and ground attack aircraft
- National origin: United States
- Manufacturer: Aeromarine
- Designer: U.S. Army Engineering Division
- Number built: 3

History
- First flight: 22 August 1922

The Aeromarine PG-1 was an American single-seat pursuit (fighter) and ground attack (PG) biplane developed by the Engineering Division of the United States Army and manufactured by the Aeromarine Plane and Motor Co.

== Development and design ==
The PG-1 was intended to fulfill both ground strafing and aerial defense roles, the contract for construction was won by Aeromarine in May 1921.

Armed with a single 0.5 in (12.7 mm) machine gun as well as a 37 mm Baldwin cannon firing through the propeller hub; the cockpit had 1/4-inch (6.35 mm) armour. The wings were dissimilar, with a wide-chord upper wing with ailerons, and a closely spaced narrow-chord lower plane with dihedral that placed the tips close to the upper wing. The upper wing was mounted close to the top of the fuselage with a cut-away forward section to accommodate the cockpit, and attached to the lower plane via V-type struts.

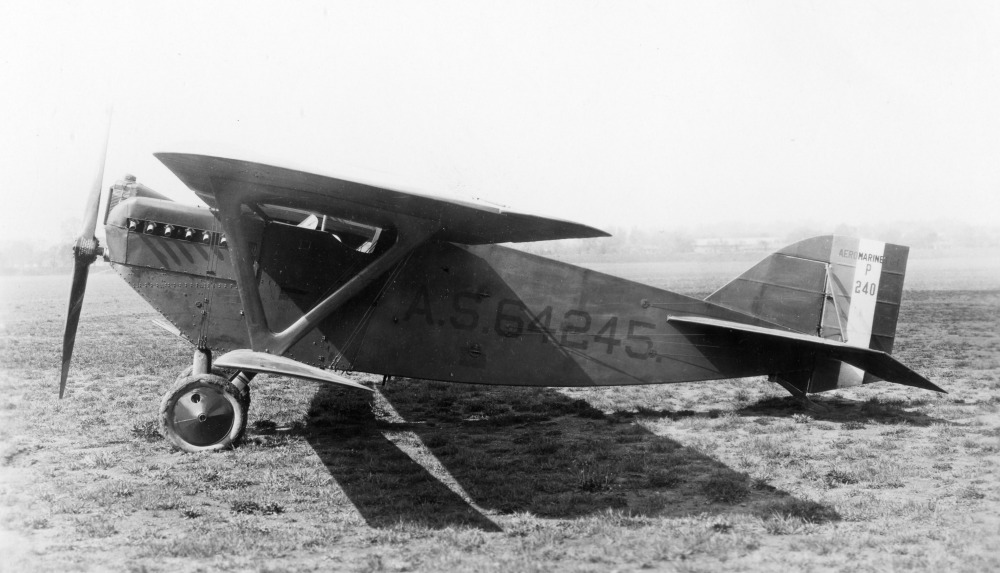

Power was to have been provided by the eight-cylinder, water-cooled 330 hp (250 kW) Wright K-2 engine but the first two prototypes were fitted with 346 hp (258 kW) Packard 1A-1116 units due to delays in clearing the K-2 for flight testing. A third prototype was also built and testing was eventually carried out using both the K-2 and Packard 1A-1237 at McCook Field. Prototype aircraft suffered disappointing performance, high levels of vibration and poor visibility. The aircraft had a tendency to spin when stalled. Development was abandoned in 1922.

== Specifications ==
Data from Angelucci, 1987. pp. 35-36.

General characteristics

- Crew: 1
- Length: 24 ft 6 in (7.47 m)
- Wingspan: 40 ft 0 in (12.19 m)
- Height: 8 ft 0 in (2.44 m)
- Wing area: 389 sq ft (36.1 m^{2})
- Empty weight: 3,030 lb (1,374 kg)
- Gross weight: 3,918 lb (1,777 kg)
- Powerplant: 1 × Packard 1A-1116 , 346 hp (258 kW)

Performance

- Maximum speed: 130 mph (210 km/h, 110 kn)
- Range: 195 mi (314 km, 169 nmi)
- Service ceiling: 19,000 ft (5,800 m)
- Rate of climb: 684 ft/min (3.47 m/s)

Armament

- Guns: 1x 37 mm (1.457 in) Baldwin cannon + 1x 0.50 in (12.7 mm) machine gun
