= Aeromarine B-90 =

1915 American aircraft engine

B-90
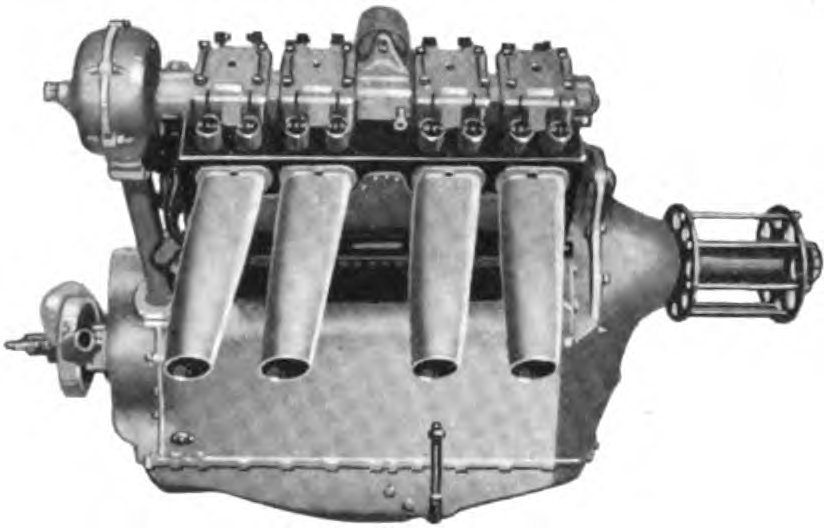
- Aeromarine B-90
- Type: V-8 piston engine
- National origin: United States
- Manufacturer: Aeromarine
- First run: 1915
- Variants: Aeromarine B-45

The Aeromarine B-90 is an aircraft engine built by the Aeromarine Plane and Motor Company in 1915. Aeromarine made two series of V-8 engines. The B series was developed by Joseph Boland and the L series by Charles F. Willard.

== Specifications ==
Data from Airplane Engine Encyclopedia

=== General characteristics ===
- Type: 8-cylinder 90° Vee piston engine
- Bore: 3.625 in (92.08 mm)
- Stroke: 5.125 in (130.18 mm)
- Displacement: 423.2 cu in (6.94 L)
- Dry weight: 460 lb (210 kg)
- Designer: Joseph Boland

=== Components ===
- Valvetrain: 2 intake and 2 exhaust valves per cylinder, single DOHC camshaft operating rockers
- Fuel system: Single 1.75 in. duplex Zenith carburetor
- Fuel type: gasoline
- Oil system: triple gear pump pressure system; HP to crankshaft; LP to camshaft; LP to oil cooler in radiator
- Cooling system: Water
- Reduction gear: .571:1
- Ignition: 2 Dixie magnetos

=== Performance ===
- Power output: maximum 166 hp (124 kW) nominal at 2,635 rpm
- Compression ratio: 5 to 1
- Power-to-weight ratio: 0.3226 hp/lb (0.5304 kW/kg)
