= Curtiss OXX =

V8 piston aircraft engine family

OXX
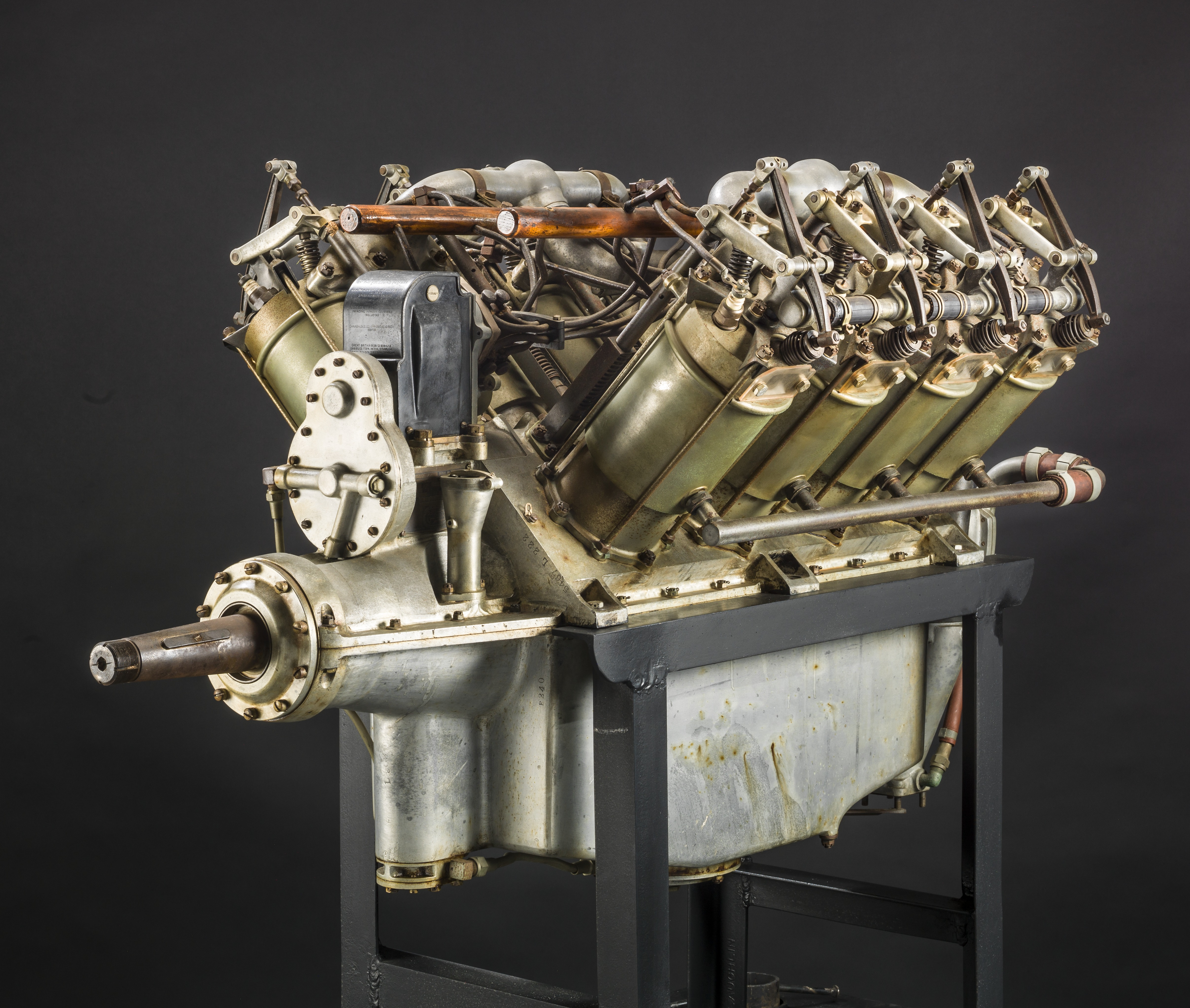
- OXX-6 at the National Air and Space Museum
- Type: V8 water-cooled piston engine
- National origin: United States of America
- Manufacturer: Curtiss
- Developed from: Curtiss OX

The Curtiss OXX was an early, dual ignition water-cooled V8 aero engine derived from the Curtiss OX.

== Variants ==
Curtiss OXX-2
Curtiss OXX-3
Curtiss OXX-5
Curtiss OXX-6

== Applications ==
- Aeromarine 39
- Aeromarine 40
- Burgess-Dunne
- Curtiss Autoplane
- Curtiss F
- Curtiss FL
- Curtiss JN-4
- Curtiss MF
- Curtiss N-9
- Standard J-1
- Waco GXE

== Engines on display ==
- The Kansas Aviation Museum has an OXX-6 on display.
- The Yanks Air Museum, Chino, CA has an OXX-6 on display
- The Cradle of Aviation Museum, Garden City, NY has an OXX-2 on exhibit.
- The Texas Air Museum - Stinson Chapter has an OXX-6 installed in a 1929 WACO GXE airplane on static display.

== Specifications (OXX-6) ==
=== General characteristics ===
- Type: 8-cylinder water-cooled Vee aircraft piston engine
- Bore: 4.25 in (114 mm)
- Stroke: 5 in (127 mm)
- Displacement: 567 in³ (9.3 L)
- Dry weight: 401 lb (182 kg)

=== Components ===
- Cooling system: Water-cooled

=== Performance ===
- Power output: 100 hp (75 kW) at 1,400 rpm
- Compression ratio: 4.92:1

== See also ==
- List of aircraft engines
