= Aeromarine =

Former american aircraft manufacturer

Coordinates: 40.443097°N 74.189394°W

Aeromarine Plane and Motor Company
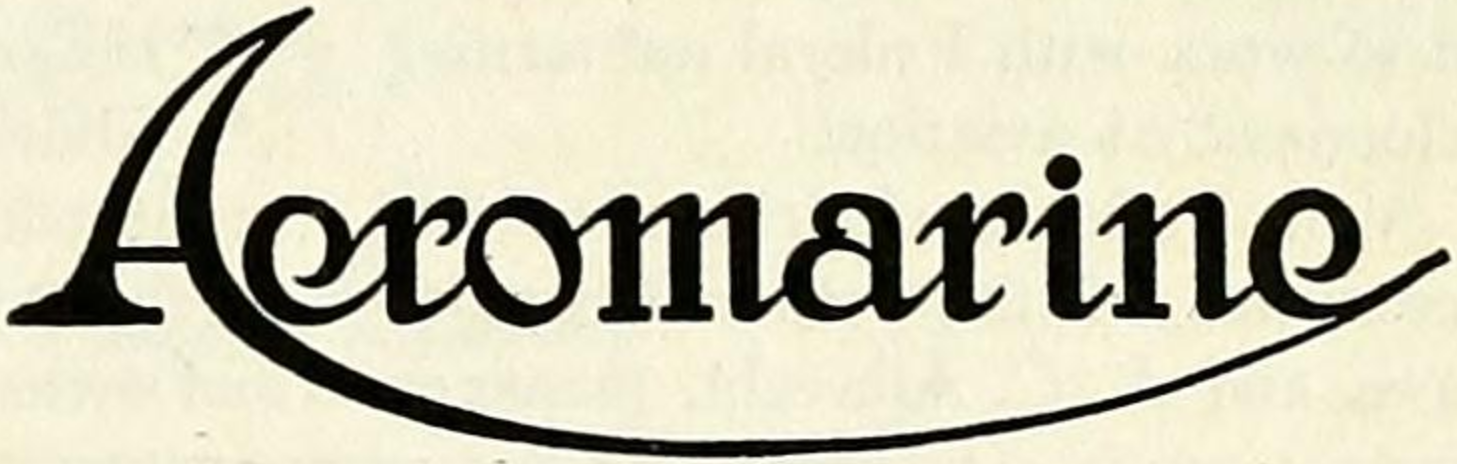
- Industry: Aerospace
- Founded: 1914
- Founder: Inglis M. Upperçu
- Defunct: 1930
- Headquarters: Keyport, New Jersey, United States
- Key people: Joseph J. Boland; Harry Bruno

The Aeromarine Plane and Motor Company was an early American aircraft manufacturer founded by Inglis M. Upperçu which operated from 1914 to 1930. From 1928 to 1930 it was known as the Aeromarine-Klemm Corporation.

== History ==
The beginnings of the company dated to 1908, when Uppercu began to finance aeronautical experiments by the Boland brothers at Keyport, New Jersey. In 1914, Aeromarine itself was founded at Keyport with Uppercu as president. Aeromarine built mostly military seaplanes and flying boats, the most significant of which were the models 39 and 40. The company broke new ground in aviation by offering some of the first regularly scheduled flights. Aviation promoter Harry Bruno worked with Aeromarine to commercialize the transportation potential of airflight.

In 1928, the firm was renamed Aeromarine-Klemm Corporation and began producing mostly Klemm aircraft designs, until the Great Depression forced its closure in 1930.

The firm also built aero engines. After Aeromarine itself went out of business, the production of Aeromarine engines was continued by the Uppercu-Burnelli Corporation.

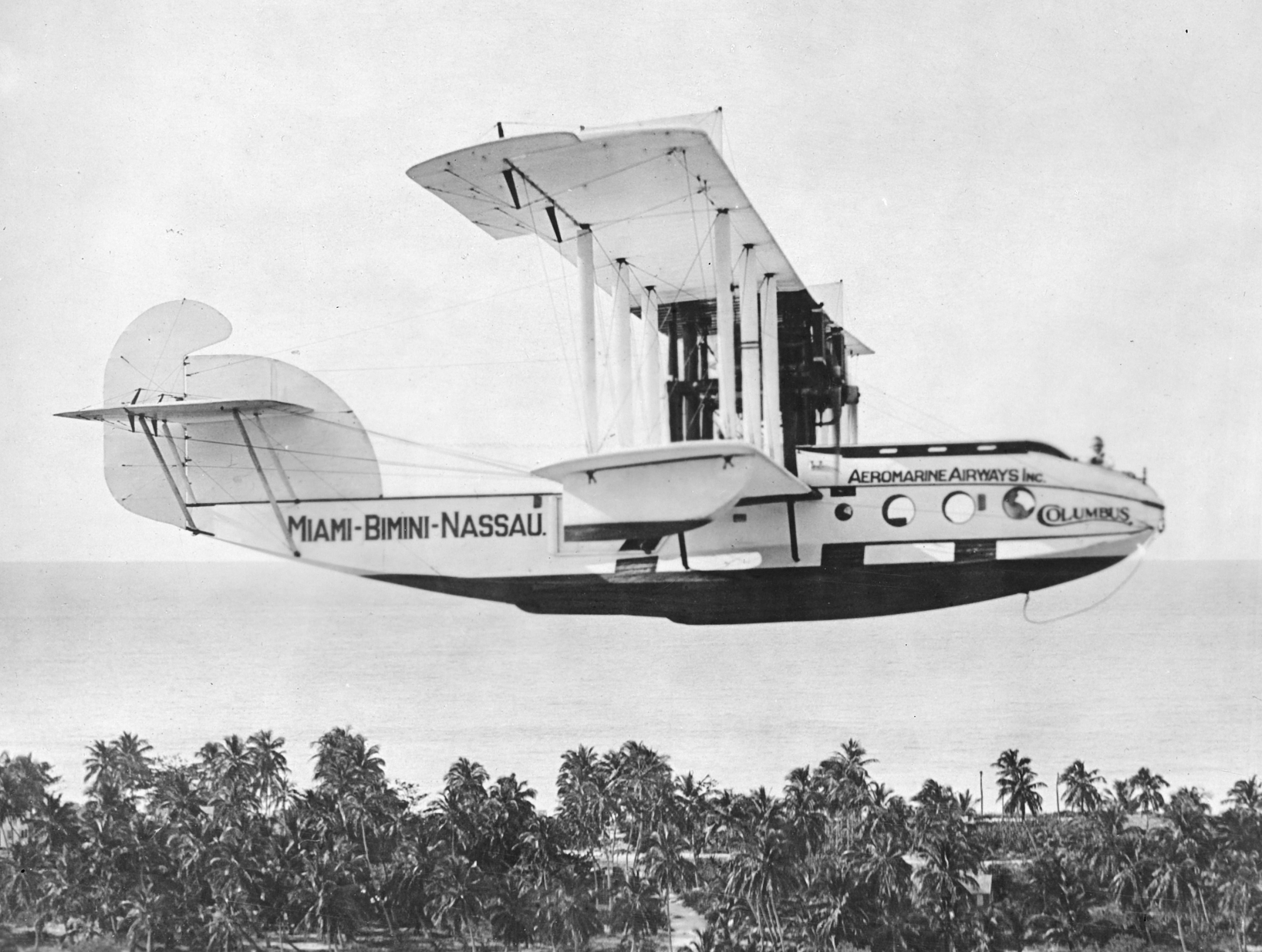
An Aeromarine 75 of Aeromarine Airways

A subsidiary "Aeromarine Sightseeing and Navigation Company" merged with Florida West Indies Airways, Inc to form the Aeromarine West Indies Airways, later renamed to "Aeromarine Airways". it operated the Aeromarine 75 and Aeromarine 85 aircraft.

== Products ==
=== Aircraft ===
Model name	First flight	Number built	Type
Aeromarine Model B	1912	1	Single engine biplane experimental airplane
Aeromarine Flying Boat	1914	1	Single engine monoplane flying boat experimental airplane
Aeromarine 39	1917	150	Single engine biplane trainer
Aeromarine M-1	1917	6	Single engine biplane trainer
Aeromarine 700	1917	2	Single engine biplane floatplane torpedo bomber
Aeromarine DH-4B	1917	125	Single engine biplane light bomber
Aeromarine 20	1918		Two to four-seat pusher plane
Aeromarine 40	1918	50	Single engine biplane flying boat trainer
Aeromarine 50	1919		Single engine biplane flying boat
Aeromarine ML	1920	3	Experimental
Aeromarine AS	1920	3	Single engine biplane floatplane fighter
Aeromarine SS	1920	3	Single engine biplane floatplane fighter
Aeromarine NBS-1	1920	25	Twin engine biplane bomber
Aeromarine 75	1920	6-8	Single engine biplane flying boat airliner
Aeromarine 80	1920	1	Single engine biplane flying boat airliner
Aeromarine 85	1920	1	Single engine biplane flying boat airliner
Aeromarine 52	1921		Single engine biplane flying boat
Aeromarine 43-L	N/A		Unbuilt passenger pusher flying boat
Aeromarine 44-L	N/A		Unbuilt passenger pusher flying boat
Aeromarine WM	1922		Single engine biplane mailplane
Aeromarine Sportsman	1922		Single engine biplane floatplane mailplane
Aeromarine PG-1	1922	3	Single engine biplane fighter
Aeromarine 55	1922		Single engine biplane flying boat
Aeromarine 60	1922		Twin engine biplane flying boat
Aeromarine L.D.B XII	N/A	0	Unbuilt four engine biplane bomber
Aeromarine L.D.B XIII	N/A	0	Unbuilt two engine monoplane bomber
Aeromarine AM-1	1923	1	Single engine biplane mailplane
Aeromarine AM-3	1923	1	Single engine biplane mailplane
Aeromarine AMC	1924	1	Single engine biplane flying boat airliner
Aeromarine AM-2	1924	1	Single engine biplane mailplane
Aeromarine EO	1924	1	Single engine biplane flying boat sport airplane
Aeromarine AT	N/A	0	Unbuilt army transport
Aeromarine ASM	1924		Sport
Aeromarine CO-L	1924	0	Single engine biplane observation airplane
Aeromarine ADA	1924		Agricultural aircraft
Aeromarine Messenger	1924	1	Single engine biplane experimental airplane
Aeromarine BM-1	N/A	0	Unbuilt single engine biplane mailplane

=== Engines ===
Model name	Configuration	Power
Aeromarine AL		
Aeromarine NAL		
Aeromarine S		
Aeromarine S-12		
Aeromarine AR-3	R3	40-55 hp
Aeromarine AR-3-40		
Aeromarine AR-5		
Aeromarine AR-7		
Aeromarine AL-24		
Aeromarine B-9		
Aeromarine B-45	V8	170 hp
Aeromarine B-90	V8	166 hp
Aeromarine D-12		
Aeromarine K-6	I6	100 hp
Aeromarine L-6	I6	130-145 hp
Aeromarine L-6-D		
Aeromarine L-6-G		
Aeromarine L-8		
Aeromarine RAD		
Aeromarine T-6		
Aeromarine U-6		
Aeromarine U-6-D		
Aeromarine U-8		
Aeromarine U-8-873		
Aeromarine U-8D		
Aeromarine 85hp		
Aeromarine 90hp	I6	90 hp
Aeromarine 100hp		
