= Aeromarine AT =

Proposed passenger biplane

AT

General information
- Type: Biplane transport
- National origin: United States
- Manufacturer: Aeromarine

History
- Manufactured: 0

The Aeromarine AT (Army Transport) was a proposed passenger biplane from Aeromarine.

== Design ==
The Aeromarine AT was a six-passenger enclosed biplane with an open cockpit for the pilot. The aircraft featured an upper wing with a large nine-foot chord, and a thinner lower wing with a two-foot chord. The cabin featured oval windows with a small overwing cabin door.

== Specifications (AT) ==
Data from Skyways

General characteristics

- Crew: 1
- Capacity: 6
- Length: 38 ft 9 in (11.81 m)
- Height: 13 ft 3 in (4.04 m)
- Propellers: 2-bladed
