= Aeromarine B-45 =

1915 American aircraft engine

B-45
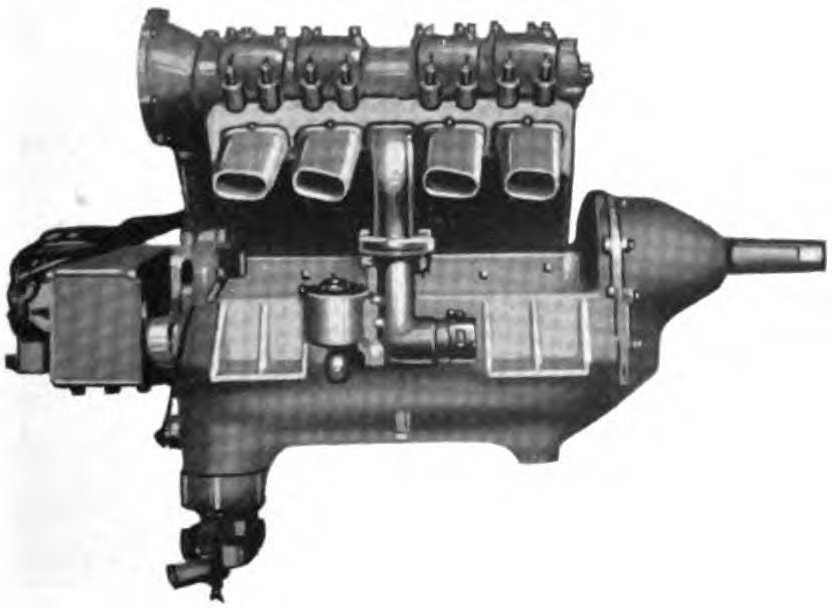
- Aeromarine B-45
- Type: V-8 piston engine
- National origin: United States
- Manufacturer: Aeromarine
- First run: 1915
- Variants: Aeromarine B-90

The Aeromarine B-45 is an aircraft engine built by the Aeromarine Plane and Motor Company in 1915. The B-45 shares the same bore, stroke and valve configuration as the B-90, except in a 45° Vee configuration. The other primary difference are cast aluminum cylinders in place of the B-90's cast iron resulting in a 40 lb (18 kg) weight savings.

== Specifications ==
Data from Airplane Engine Encyclopedia

=== General characteristics ===
- Type: 8-cylinder 45° Vee piston engine
- Bore: 3.625 in (92.08 mm)
- Stroke: 5.125 in (130.18 mm)
- Displacement: 423.2 cu in (6.94 L)
- Length: 42.875 in (1,089.02 mm)
- Width: 22.375 in (568.32 mm)
- Height: 36.875 in (936.62 mm)
- Dry weight: 420 lb (190 kg)
- Designer: Joseph Boland

=== Components ===
- Valvetrain: 2 intake and 2 exhaust valves per cylinder, DOHC
- Fuel system: Single 1.75 in. duplex Zenith carburetor
- Fuel type: gasoline
- Cooling system: Water
- Reduction gear: .571:1
- Ignition: 2 Dixie 800 magnetos

=== Performance ===
- Power output: 170 hp (130 kW) nominal at 2,635 rpm
- Compression ratio: 5 to 1
- Power-to-weight ratio: 0.40 hp/lb (0.66 kW/kg)
