= 1923 Aeromarine 75 Columbus incident =

Airliner ditching in 1923

Coordinates: 23.4172°N 82.2753°W

Columbus
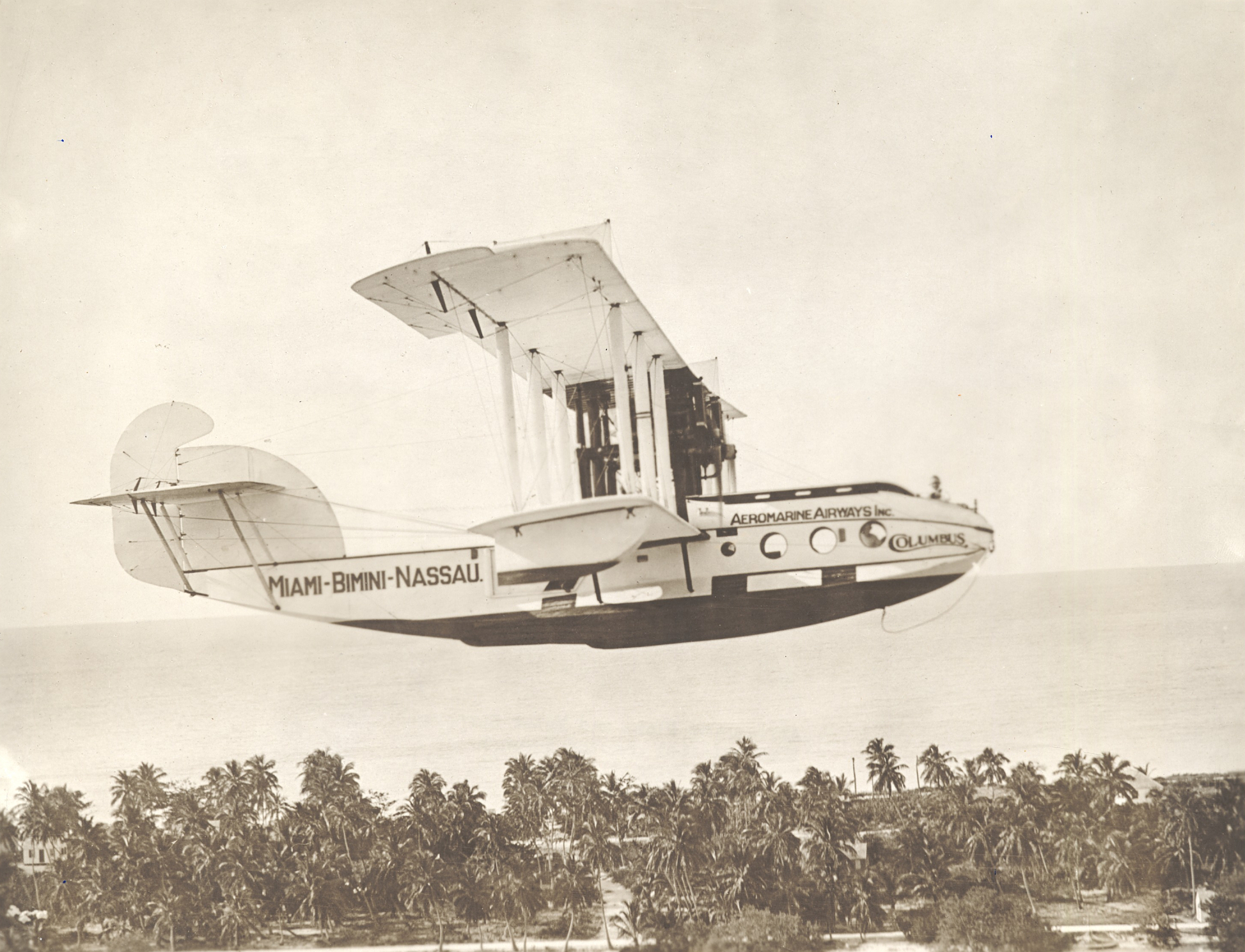
- Columbus over Bimini, 1921

Ditching
- Date: 13 January 1923
- Summary: Ditching
- Site: Straits of Florida, 32 km (20 miles) N off Havana
- Total fatalities: 4

Aircraft
- Aircraft type: Aeromarine 75
- Aircraft name: Columbus
- Operator: Aeromarine West Indies Airways
- Flight origin: Key West Harbor, Key West, Florida, United States
- Destination: Havana, Cuba
- Occupants: 9
- Passengers: 7
- Crew: 2
- Fatalities: 4
- Survivors: 5

On January 13, 1923, Aeromarine 75 passenger seaplane Columbus ditched in the Straits of Florida after developing engine troubles on a flight from Key West, Florida to Havana, Cuba. The plane filled with water and sank after being hit by waves, killing four passengers. The remaining passengers and two crew were later rescued by a passing ferry, H. M. Flagler. The accident was the first major passenger flight disaster in American aviation. The flight operator, Aeromarine West Indies Airways, would shut down the following year due to financial losses.

== Accident ==
The plane departed Key West for Havana as usual, a regular daily trip. When 20 or 21 miles north of Havana, however, engine trouble arose. The pilot was forced to make an emergency descent to try and fix the issue. When he turned the nose towards the water for the descent, "something snapped" and the plane "crumpled", diving uncontrollably.

The pilot glided around a few times in an attempt to smooth out the landing due to rough sea conditions present in the area. Unfortunately, the plane instead ended up landing in "the trough of a big wave", which instantly crushed the center of the passenger cabin. Two children sleeping in the cabin are believed to have been killed instantly when it was crushed. The plane quickly began to sink due to violent landing and the 10–15 (or 15–20) foot waves present in the straits.

The plane's wreckage remained partially afloat, so the remaining five occupants (both crew and five passengers) clung to it awaiting rescue. Initially two other passengers also made it out but slipped off before help could arrive.

The H. M. Flagler, a ferry passing through the area at the time whose occupants witnessed the crash from 0.75 miles away, was immediately turned towards the crash site by captain John Albury, and quickly dispatched a small lifeboat to send aid from 150 yards away. The five survivors were retrieved, unharmed apart from some bruises but wet and in shock.

As this was happening, the crew of the Flagler sent out a radiogram to report the crash. The Flagler arrived that night at Key West with the survivors onboard.

== Crew and passengers ==
=== Crew ===
The pilot of the Columbus for the flight was W. E. (or C. W.) Miller, accompanied by technician Harold Thompson. Both survived the accident.

=== Passengers ===
The four passengers lost in the accident were 30-year-old millionaire sugar planter Edwin Farnsworth Atkins Jr. of New York City, his two sons Edwin III and David, 5 and 3 respectively, and the family governess, Grace MacDonald. Atkins, the son of the former board of directors chairman of the American Sugar Refining Company, had extensive sugar investments in Cuba at the time, and was well-known both there and in New York. Edwin III and David were killed sleeping when the cabin was crushed, and Edwin Jr. and MacDonald were swept off the wreckage by a wave while awaiting rescue. (Other sources simply claim they were all trapped in their seats.)

The three surviving passengers were Atkins' wife, the family nurse, Julia Haverty, and wealthy New York banker/broker Otto Abrams (or Abrahams). The pilot began to hang onto them after Atkins Jr. and MacDonald were swept away. Atkins' wife was said to be "dazed" and unaware of what had happened; she had just arrived from Boston to join the family in Cuba.

== Aftermath ==
Searches for the bodies of the four lost passengers were launched shortly afterwards, but with little hope due to conditions at sea at the time and shark activity in the area. The main search effort was called off two days later, their bodies were never recovered, although smaller searches continued in the weeks after. The wreckage of the aircraft was also lost, having sunk into the Straits.

400 pounds of first-class mail, the entire shipment from Key West, were also lost in the accident.

The pilot praised captain Albury and his crew for their heroic assistance provided during the situation. The five survivors were released from hospital care two days later, with Mrs. Atkins being sent to the home of a friend in Key West. Her condition improved in the following days.

Despite having carried over 20,000 passengers with a perfect safety record by 1923, financial impacts from the loss of Columbus would devastate Aeromarine. The airline shut down the following year.
