= Aeromarine AMC =

AMC (Aeromarine Metal Commercial)

General information
- Type: Commercial flying boat
- National origin: United States
- Manufacturer: Aeromarine
- Number built: 1

History
- Introduction date: 1923
- First flight: 1 June 1923

The Aeromarine AMC was the first American all-metal hulled commercial flying boat.

== Development ==
Design work on the AMC started in 1921 with the goal of producing an aluminum-hulled flying boat that would be more durable than contemporary all-wood construction. Aeromarine's wooden-hulled boats required drying out when waterlogged. The excess weight of a waterlogged hull could be as much as 456 lb. A model of the AMC was wind-tunnel tested at MIT before choosing an open cockpit design.

== Design ==
The AMC was a two-bay biplane flying boat with an aluminum hull. The spruce woodspar wings were fabric covered with small tip floats for stability. The engine was mounted just below the top wing in a pusher configuration with a forward-mounted radiator. Two 50-gallon streamlined main fuel tanks sat on the top wing on either side of the engine with a 70-gallon fuselage-mounted reserve. The hull was constructed of eighteen forms and five watertight bulkheads. It had two rows of small bench seats for passengers in the front. The pilot and mechanic sat slightly raised in individual open cockpits behind the passengers, beneath the main wing. The hull used Alcoa 17S aluminum treated with potassium nitrate with Canton flannel/Asphalt watertight seals and Valspar aluminum paint.

== Operational history ==
The AMC was intended to replace the Aeromarine 75 flying boats used by Aeromarine Airways in service between New York, San Juan, and Puerto Rico. Within three days of its first flight on 1 June 1923, the aircraft was flown from Keyport, New Jersey to New York to try to find additional customers. The aircraft flew 800 passengers on 186 flights before delivery to Aeromarine Airways in December 1923. The aircraft was christened the Morrow Castle II and flew on record-setting long-distance flights between New Jersey, Cuba, San Juan, and Puerto Rico totalling fifteen thousand miles before returning to New Jersey. Aeromarine ceased service in late 1924, without a customer base for sales, only the one AMC was completed.

The sole AMC was sold to Fairchild Air Transport (Fairchild Aerial Surveys Co of Canada Ltd ) on 25 May 1926 for use on Canadian passenger service and aerial photography. It was dismantled on 28 February 1930.

== Specifications (AMC) ==
Data from Skyways

General characteristics

- Crew: two
- Capacity: five-seven
- Length: 35 ft 10 in (10.92 m)
- Upper wingspan: 65 ft (20 m)
- Lower wingspan: 48 ft 6 in (14.78 m)
- Height: 13 ft 6 in (4.11 m)
- Airfoil: (upper) Aeromarine No. 6, (lower) Aeromarine No. 2
- Empty weight: 3,660 lb (1,660 kg)
- Max takeoff weight: 6,100 lb (2,767 kg)
- Fuel capacity: 170 U.S. gallons (640 L; 140 imp gal)
- Powerplant: 1 × Liberty L-12 , 400 hp (300 kW)
- Propellers: 2-bladed

Performance

- Maximum speed: 91.1 kn (104.8 mph, 168.7 km/h)
- Cruise speed: 70 kn (80 mph, 130 km/h)
- Stall speed: 41 kn (47 mph, 76 km/h)
- Endurance: 7 hours
- Service ceiling: 14,000 ft (4,300 m)
- Rate of climb: 3,300 ft/min (17 m/s)

== See also ==
Aircraft of comparable role, configuration, and era

- Curtiss HS
