= Aeromarine Model 60 =

Model 60

General information
- Type: Passenger Limousine Flying Boat
- National origin: United States
- Manufacturer: Aeromarine
- Number built: 1

History
- Introduction date: March 1923

The Aeromarine Model 60 is a twin engine seaplane design from the Aeromarine aircraft company.

== Development ==
The original 1920 specification called for two 180 hp H-S engines. The sole production model produced in 1923 featured Aeromarine U-8-D engines. The prototype was not flown

== Design ==
The Model 60 is a five-passenger enclosed biplane seaplane with twin pusher engines.

== Specifications (Aeromarine Model 60) ==
Data from Skyways

General characteristics

- Crew: 1
- Capacity: 4
- Length: 31 ft 9 in (9.68 m)
- Upper wingspan: 55 ft 6 in (16.92 m)
- Gross weight: 5,050 lb (2,291 kg)
- Powerplant: 2 × Aeromarine U-8D , 250 hp (190 kW) each

Performance

- Maximum speed: 91 kn (105 mph, 169 km/h)
- Minimum control speed: 43 kn (50 mph, 80 km/h)
- Rate of climb: 650 ft/min (3.3 m/s)
