= Aeromarine AS =

1920s floatplane fighter aircraft

AS
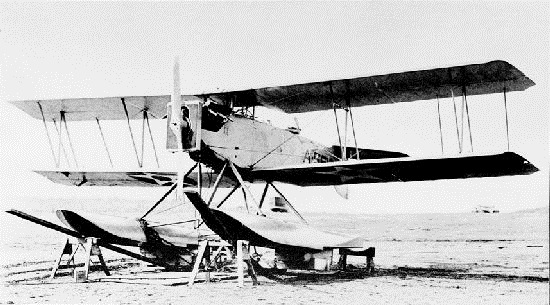
- AS-2

General information
- Type: Scout biplane
- National origin: United States
- Manufacturer: Aeromarine
- Primary user: US Navy
- Number built: 3 (1 AS-1, 2 AS-2)

The Aeromarine AS was a seaplane fighter aircraft evaluated by the US Navy in the early 1920s.

== Development and design ==
Other than the vertical stabilizer, it was configured as a conventional two-bay biplane on twin pontoons, with two seats. The sole example of the original design, designated AS-1 had an inverted fin. After evaluation testing, the Navy ordered two aircraft, designated AS-2. The AS-2 had cruciform tails and larger radiators, and ailerons on both upper and lower wings.

== Variants ==
- A.S.-1 1 built
- A.S.-2 2 built

== Specifications (AS-1) ==
Data from Angelucci, 1987. pp. 35–36.

General characteristics

- Crew: 2
- Length: 30 ft 10 in (9.40 m)
- Wingspan: 37 ft 6 in (11.43 m)
- Height: 10 ft 10 in (3.30 m)
- Wing area: 386 sq ft (35.9 m^{2})
- Empty weight: 2,298 lb (1,042 kg)
- Gross weight: 3,233 lb (1,466 kg)
- Powerplant: 1 × Wright-Hispano E , 300 hp (220 kW)

Performance

- Maximum speed: 117 mph (188 km/h, 102 kn)
- Stall speed: 56 mph (90 km/h, 49 kn)
- Endurance: 3 h
- Service ceiling: 16,000 ft (4,900 m)
- Rate of climb: 750 ft/min (3.8 m/s)

Armament

- 2x machine guns
