= Aeromarine M-1 =

M-1
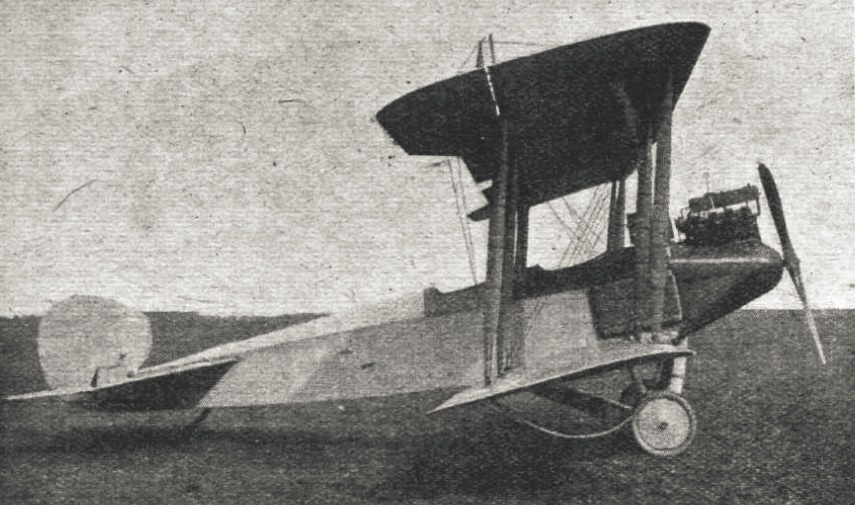

General information
- Type: Trainer
- National origin: United States
- Manufacturer: Aeromarine
- Designer: Charles F. Willard
- Primary user: Aviation Section, U.S. Signal Corps
- Number built: 6

History
- First flight: 1917
- Variant: Aeromarine 39

The Aeromarine M-1 was a two-seat training biplane ordered by the US Army's Aviation Section, U.S. Signal Corps (USAAS) in 1917 and built by the Aeromarine Plane and Motor Company of Keyport, New Jersey.

== Design and development ==
Originally known as Aeromarine Training Tractor, Aeromarine's chief designer, Charles F. Willard, designed a two place trainer in both land-plane and seaplane configuration. The land plane was designated the Aeromarine M-1 and was produced to US Army Specification No.1001. The seaplane version was later called the Aeromarine 39 and sold to the United States Navy (USN). Both aircraft shared much in common, aside from the undercarriage, the primary difference was that the M-1's wingspan was shorter than the Aeromarine 39.

== Operational history ==
Six aircraft were produced and assigned serial numbers 265/270. During Army testing, the aircraft proved to be unsuitable for a training. "Preliminary tests showed that the M1 was unstable in anything but level flight, and most spent the war years packed in their crates."

In 1920, there was a proposal to re-engine these aircraft with the Aeromarine 100hp motor

== Specifications (Aeromarine M-1) ==
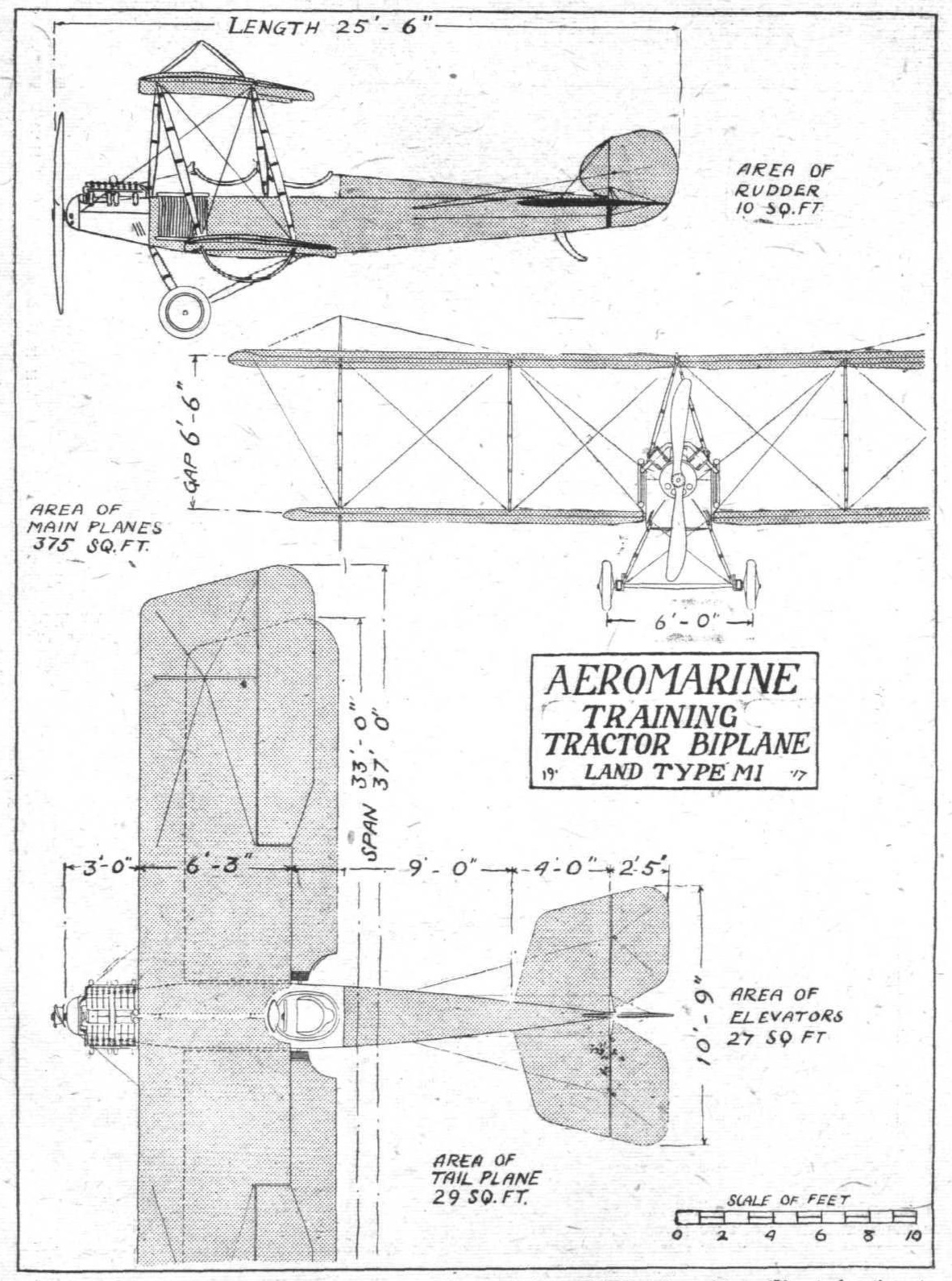
Aeromarine M-1 3 view drawing Flight Magazine 1917-08-02 pg.782

General characteristics

- Crew: 2
- Length: 25 ft 6 in (7.77 m)
- Upper wingspan: 37 ft 0 in (11.28 m)
- Lower wingspan: 33 ft 0 in (10.06 m)
- Wing area: 425 sq ft (39.5 m^{2})
- Airfoil: RAF 6
- Empty weight: 1,200 lb (544 kg)
- Gross weight: 1,900 lb (862 kg)
- Powerplant: 1 × Hall-Scott A-7 4-cylinder water-cooled in-line piston engine, 100 hp (75 kW)
- Propellers: 2-bladed

Performance

- Maximum speed: 78 mph (126 km/h, 68 kn)
- Time to altitude: 10 minutes to 3,500 ft (1,066.80 m)
