= Aeromarine 700 =

Model 700
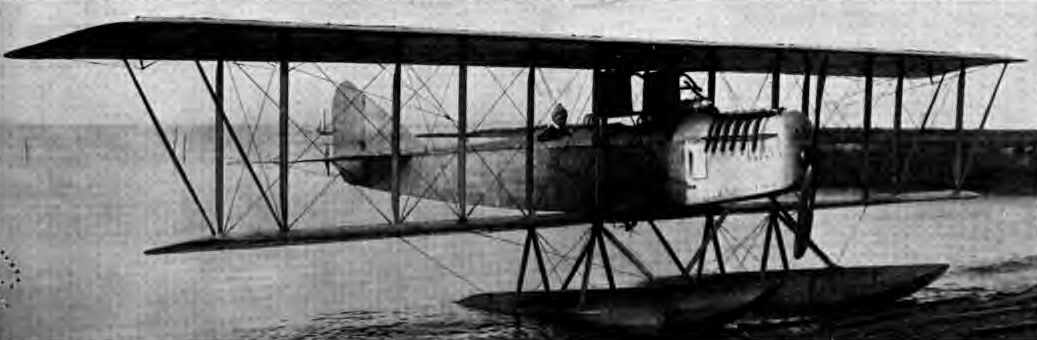

General information
- Type: Floatplane
- National origin: United States of America
- Manufacturer: Aeromarine
- Primary user: US Navy
- Number built: 2

History
- First flight: 1917

The Aeromarine 700 was an early US Navy seaplane developed in 1917 to investigate the feasibility of using aircraft to launch torpedoes. The aircraft itself was a large biplane of conventional three-bay configuration equipped with two pontoons, powered by a 100 hp (75 kW) Aeromarine K-6. Only six examples were built (AS142-AS144, all of which were damaged early on, with parts of AS143 being used to repair AS440 of the 2nd batch, AS439-AS441.

== Operators ==
United States
US Navy
