= M60 =

M60, M-60, or M.60 most often refers to:

- M60 machine gun, an American machine gun
- M60 tank, an American main battle tank

M60, M-60, or M.60 may also refer to:

== Firearms and military equipment ==
- M60 105mm Cartridge, a U.S. chemical artillery shell
- M60 recoilless gun, an 82-mm antitank recoilless gun developed in Yugoslavia
- OT M-60, a Yugoslav armoured personnel carrier
- M60 AVLB, an American bridgelaying tank
- Halcon M60, an Argentine 9mm/.45 ACP submachine gun
- Saber Radar, M60 air defense radar unit developed by the Brazilian Army
- New Nambu M60, a Japanese double-action revolver

== Transportation ==
- M.60 Marathon, an aircraft
- M60 (New York City bus), a New York City Bus route in Manhattan and Queens
- BMW M60, a 1992 automobile engine

=== Motorways ===
- M-60 (Michigan highway), a state highway in southern Michigan
- M60 highway (Russia), a highway in the Russian Far East
- M60 motorway (Hungary), a motorway in Hungary
- M60 motorway (Great Britain), a motorway in Greater Manchester, England

== Other uses ==
- M60, a 1984 Olivetti Zilog Z8001 based computer
- Messier 60, an elliptical galaxy in the Virgo Cluster
- M 60, an age group for Masters athletics (athletes aged 35+)

== See also ==
- Model 60 (disambiguation)
