= Inglis M. Uppercu =

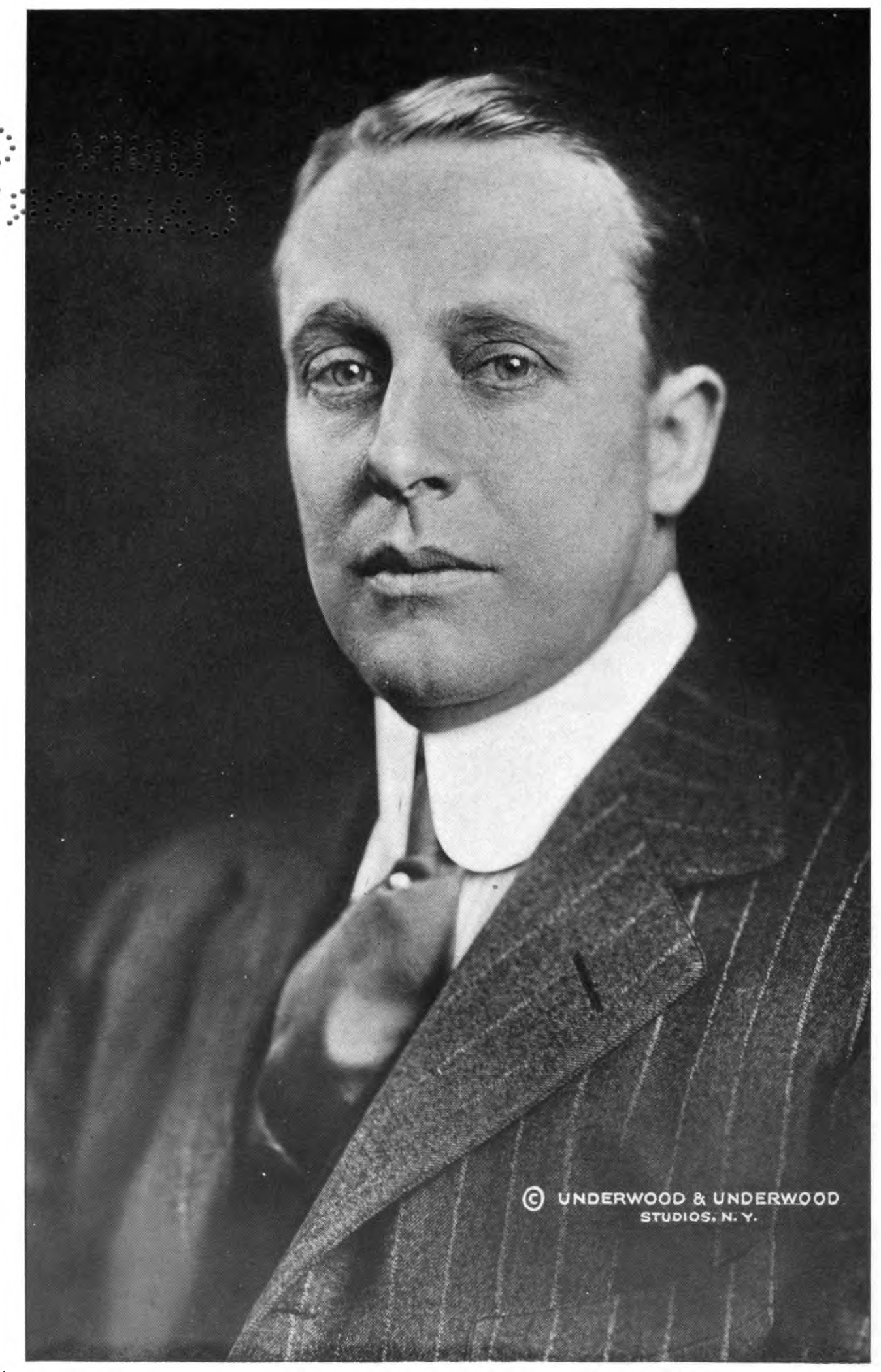
- Born: 17, September 1877; Evanston, Illinois
- Died: 7, April 1944; New York City
- Education: Polytechnic School of Brooklyn, Columbia University Law School
- Known for: Aeromarine aircraft
- Spouse: Ella Krueger

Inglis Moore Uppercu (1877–1944) was an American businessman involved in both the automotive and aviation industry. He was the founder and president of Aeromarine Plane and Motor Company.

== Early life ==
Uppercu was born on September 17, 1877, in North Evanston, Illinois, to Jesse Wheat Uppercu and Laura Isabella (Hildebrant) Uppercu.

His family moved to New York City in 1888. Uppercu went to the Polytechnic School of Brooklyn and Columbia University Law School.

== Automotive career ==
Starting in 1896, Uppercu was involved in the automotive industry in the New York and New Jersey area. Working initially for the Duryea Motor Wagon Company and the Neostyle Co., in 1902, he established the Motor Car Co. of New Jersey. Through this company, Uppercu sold Autocar, Cadillac and Packard automobiles in the New York-New Jersey area. In 1908, he acquired the New York City Cadillac dealership and reorganized his automotive operations as the Detroit Cadillac Motor Car Co.

Uppercu formed a relationship with the custom coach builder Healey & Co. and by the mid-teens, the Detroit Cadillac Motor Car Co was Healey's largest customer. Many of Healey's custom coaches for Cadillac chassis were designed by Uppercu's manager of his custom body department, J.R. McLauchlen. Healey also built bus bodies for Uppercu's Aeromarine Airways for Cadillac and Packard chassis that were used to shuttle passengers from the city to seaplane bases of the airline. When William Mansfield Healey retired in 1923, Uppercu took over his business and moved it to his Aeromarine aircraft factory in Keyport, NJ, renaming it Healey-Aeromarine Bus Company, which continued bus and automobile coach building until 1926.

Uppercu found, rehabilitated and, in 1920, donated an 1893 Duryea automobile to the Smithsonian, where it is still on exhibit.

In 1931, Uppercu sold his automotive operations to General Motors' Cadillac Motor Car Division.

== Aeronautical career ==
Uppercu's interest in aviation dates to 1908 when he was taken for a flight with Frank Boland in one of his innovative tailless biplanes. Impressed, Uppercu invested in, and was the primary financial backer, of the Boland Airplane and Motor Company. After Frank Boland's death in 1913, Uppercu bought out Boland's widow and Boland's brother Joseph's interest in the Borland Aeroplane and Motor Company and, in 1914, renamed it to Aeromarine Plane and Motor Company. In 1917, Aeromarine was one of the few companies in the country capable of mass-producing aircraft. The United States Navy, anticipating possible involvement in World War I, and the need for trained pilots, issued one of the first major contracts for 250 aircraft to Aeromarine for its Aeromarine 39 trainer.

After the war, the sell off of cheap military surplus aircraft made it very difficult for aircraft manufacturers and, in 1924, Aeromarine ceased production of aircraft and aircraft engines In 1924, Uppercu formed the Uppercu-Burnelli Airplane Co to develop lifting body aircraft designed by Vincent Burnelli. The Aeromarine aircraft patents and designs were transferred to this company.

Aeromarine continued as a manufacturer of aircraft instruments and engine starters for the remainder of the 1920s. In 1928, Uppercu and Joseph Boland restarted aircraft production as Aeromarine-Klemm, producing a licensed built version of the Klemm lightweight monoplanes.

In 1919, Uppercu formed the genesis of what was to become Aeromarine Airways, by flying sightseeing tours of New York harbor in Aeromarine designed flying boats. Aeromarine Airways became one of the first successful scheduled airline in the United States, using flying boats for regular service from southern Florida to the Bahamas and the Caribbean, and from Cleveland to Detroit.

Uppercu was actively involved in the promotion and development of aircraft in the post-war years. He was a founding member of both the Manufacturers Aircraft Association and the Aeronautical Chamber of Commerce.

Uppercu left the aviation business in 1936 and retired from all business operations in 1938.

== Personal life ==
In 1906, he sold a vehicle to Judge Gottfried Krueger, and married his daughter, Ella Krueger, whom he taught to drive in the vehicle. Together, they had 5 daughters.

Uppercu was an avid yachtsman. His personal yacht, the clipper rigged Seven Seas, was kept moored on the Hudson River.

Uppercu died in New York City on April 7, 1944.
