= Aeromarine 40 =

Aeromarine 40F
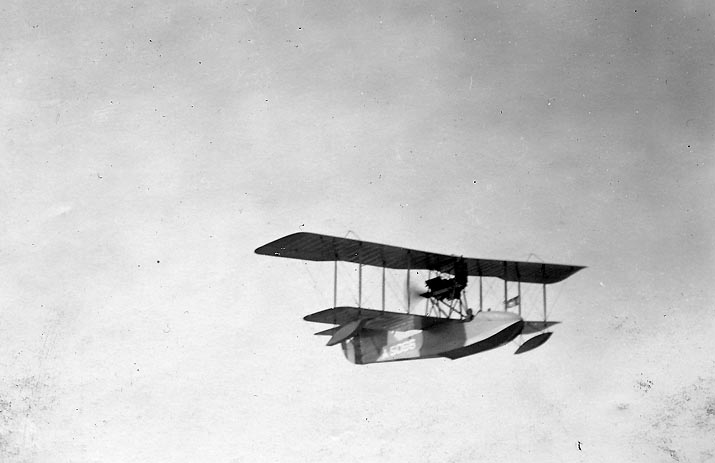
- An Aeromarine 40 in flight over USS Hannibal in 1923

General information
- Type: Flying-boat trainer
- Manufacturer: Aeromarine Plane and Motor Company
- Primary user: United States Navy
- Number built: 50

History
- First flight: 1919

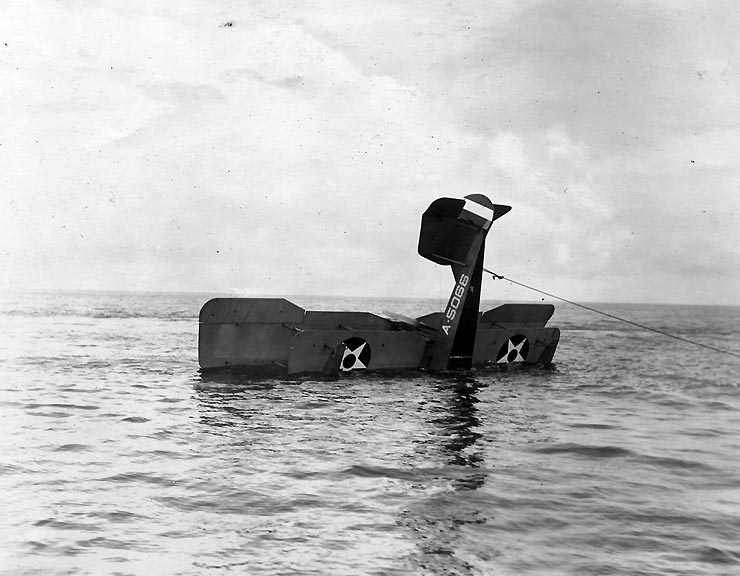
Aeromarine 41, wrecked in the Gulf of Bacabano, Cuba, 1923

The Aeromarine 40F was an American two-seat flying-boat training aircraft produced for the US Navy and built by the Aeromarine Plane and Motor Company of Keyport, New Jersey. Fifty out of an original order for 200 were delivered before the end of World War I, with the remainder cancelled due to the armistice.

The aircraft was a biplane with a pusher propeller. The pilot and instructor sat side by side. The Aeromarine 41 developed from the Aeromarine 40. At least some of the Model 40s were later converted to Model 41s.

== Operators ==
Brazil

- Brazilian Naval Aviation

United States

- United States Navy

== Variants ==
- Model 40, 40B - Civilian 140 hp Hispano Suiza
- Model 40C - 150 hp Aeromarine
- Model 40L - 140 hp Aeromarine L
- Model 40T - 100 hp Curtiss OXX-6
- Model 40U - 100 hp Aeromarine U-6

== Specifications (40F) ==
=== General characteristics ===
- Crew: two, pilot and instructor
- Length: 28 ft 11 in (8.8 m)
- Wingspan: 48 ft 6 in (14.8 m)
- Height: m (ft in)
- Wing area: ft^{2} (m^{2})
- Empty weight: 2,061 lb (935 kg)
- Maximum weight: 2,592 lb (1,175 kg)
- Powerplant: 1 × Curtiss OXX V-8, 100 hp (72 kW)

=== Performance ===
- Maximum speed: 71 mph (114 km/h)
- Range: 250 miles (403 km)
- Service ceiling: 3,500 ft (1,067 m)
- Rate of climb: ft/min (m/min)
