= Felixstowe F5L =

English flying boat model

F5L
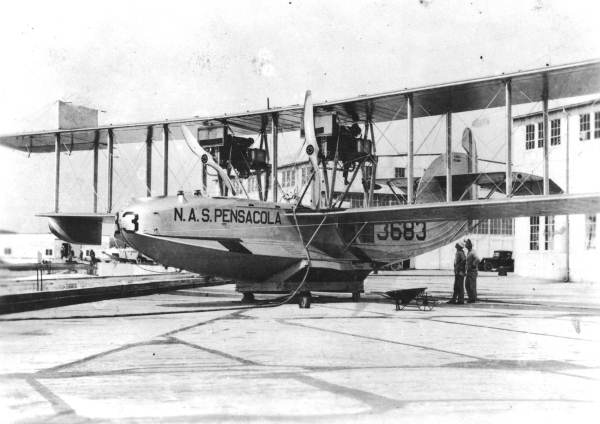
- Curtiss F5L patrol plane at Pensacola Naval Air Station

General information
- Type: Military flying boat
- National origin: United Kingdom
- Manufacturer: Naval Aircraft Factory (137); Curtiss Aircraft (60); Canadian Aeroplanes Limited (30)
- Designer: John Cyril Porte
- Primary users: United States Navy Aeromarine Plane and Motor Company (Aeromarine 75); Atlantic Coast Airways Corporation of Delaware
- Number built: 227

History
- Introduction date: November 1918
- First flight: 15 July 1918
- Retired: 1928
- Developed from: Felixstowe F.5
- Variant: Naval Aircraft Factory PN

The twin-engine F5L was one of the Felixstowe F series of flying boats developed by John Cyril Porte at the Seaplane Experimental Station, Felixstowe, England, during the First World War for production in America.

A civilian version of the aircraft was known as the Aeromarine 75.

== Design and development ==
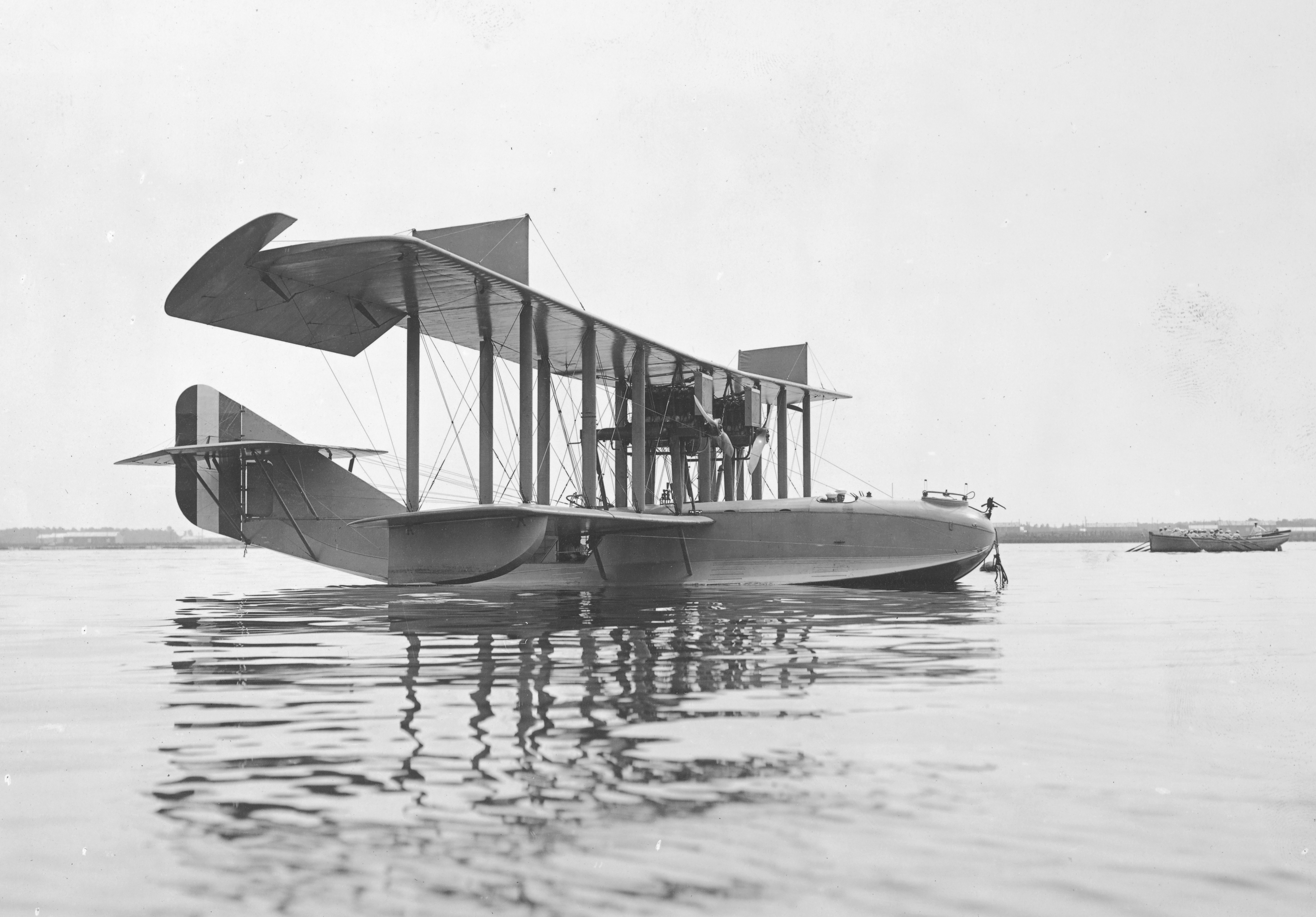
The first Naval Aircraft Factory F5L, 24 July 1918.

Porte had taken the Curtiss H-12, an original design by the American Glenn Curtiss, and developed it into a practical series of flying boats at the Felixstowe station. They then took their F.5 model and further redesigned it with better streamlining, a stronger hull using veneer instead of doped linen and U.S.-built 330 hp (later 400 hp) Liberty 12A engines. The prototype was built and tested in England and the design then taken over by the Naval Aircraft Factory, Philadelphia, where further modifications were made to suit their production methods under wartime conditions. The American-built version was also known as the Curtiss F5L and (in civilian operation) as the Aeromarine 75.

The F5L was built by the Naval Aircraft Factory (137), Curtiss (60) and Canadian Aeroplanes Limited (30). Some were converted for civilian use by the Aeromarine Plane and Motor Company in 1919.

== Operational history ==
The F5L entered U.S. service at the end of the war and was the U.S. Navy's standard patrol aircraft until 1928, when it was replaced by the PN-12.

In civil service, named the Aeromarine 75, the Felixstowe F5L could accommodate 10 passengers and was operated by Aeromarine Airways on flights from Key West to Havana, carrying the first U.S. Post Office international air mail on flights from New York City to Atlantic City, and from Cleveland to Detroit. The first in-flight movie screened in an Aeromarine 75 during the Pageant of Progress Exposition, Chicago, August 1921.

A further civil conversion for the Atlantic Coast Airways Corporation of Delaware was reported to accommodate 25 passengers in August 1928, with talkies by First National Pictures run as a test on the inaugural flight. The airline bought about six ex-U.S. Navy aircraft and advertised a service between Montreal, Boston, Newport, New York, Atlantic City, Charleston, Miami and Havana.

== Operators ==
Argentina

- Argentine Naval Aviation

Brazil

- Brazilian Naval Aviation – Curtiss F5L

Philippine Islands

- Philippine Air Service

United States

- United States Navy
- Aeromarine Airways
- Atlantic Coast Airways Corporation of Delaware

== Accidents and incidents ==
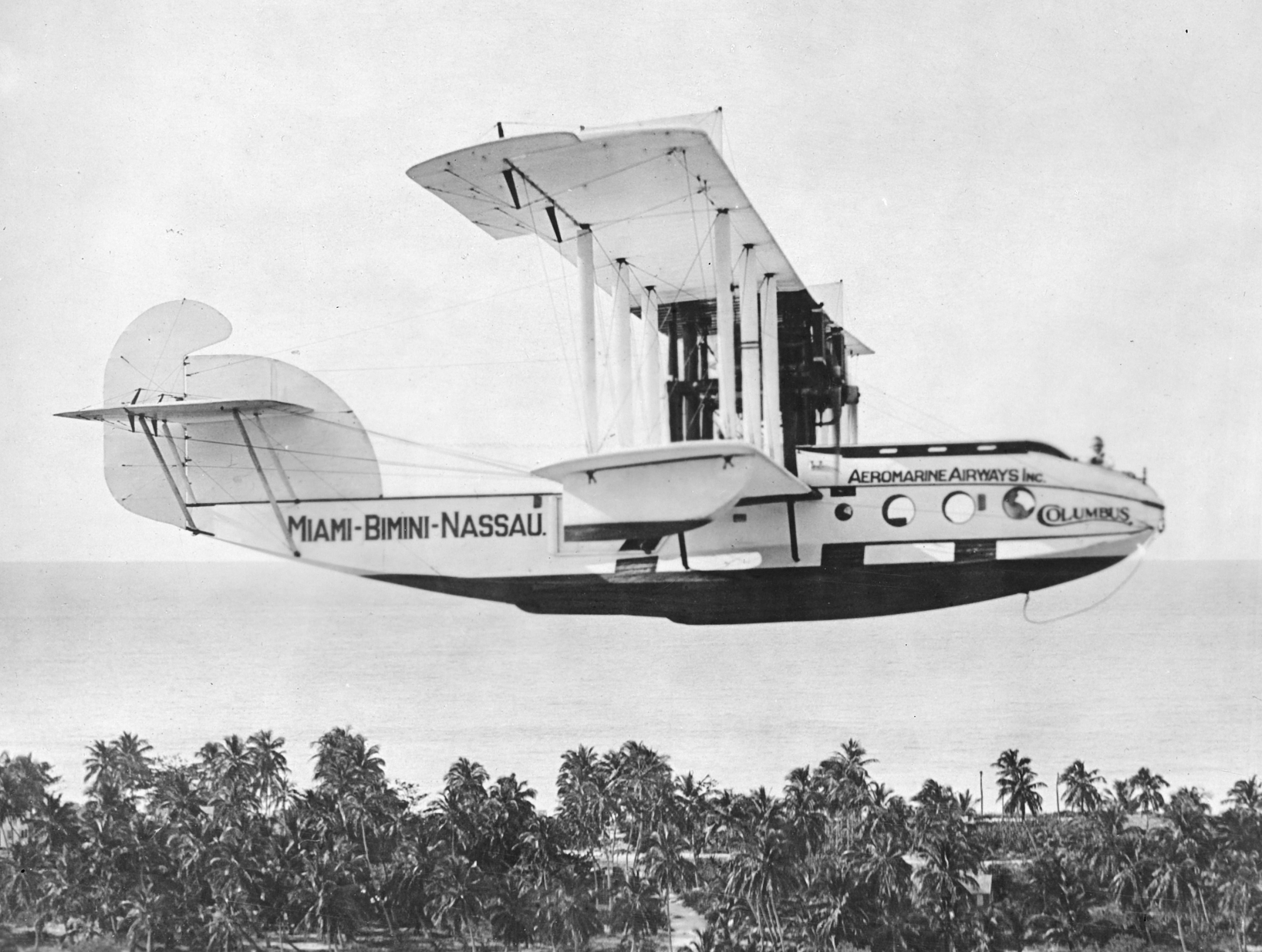
Aeromarine 75 Columbus flying over Bimini in the Bahamas, 1921.

On 13 January 1923, the Aeromarine Airways Aeromarine 75 Columbus suffered engine failure during a flight from Key West to Havana and landed in the Florida Strait. Buffeted by 10-to-15-foot (3-to-4.5-metre) waves, its hull began to fill with water. Four passengers died, but the ferry ship H. M. Flagler saved the other three passengers and both crew members.

== Survivors ==
Both a hull and float from a US Navy F5L are preserved at the National Air and Space Museum (Smithsonian). The hull is only partially skinned with wood to reveal structure. Both artifacts are presently in storage and not available for public display.

== Specifications ==
Data from Flight 31 July 1919, Smithsonian National Air and Space Museum:Felixstowe

General characteristics

- Crew: 4
- Capacity: 5,224 lb (2,370 kg) useful load
- Length: 49 ft 4 in (15.04 m)
- Upper wingspan: 103 ft 9.25 in (31.63 m)
- Lower wingspan: 74 ft 4 in (22.66 m)
- Height: 18 ft 9.25 in (5.72 m)
- Wing area: 1,394 sq ft (129.5 m^{2})
- Empty weight: 8,720 lb (3,955 kg)
- Gross weight: 14,334 lb (6,502 kg)
- Powerplant: 2 × Liberty L-12A V-12 water-cooled piston engines, 400 hp (300 kW) each
- Propellers: 2-bladed fixed-pitch propellers

Performance

- Maximum speed: 90 mph (140 km/h, 78 kn)
- Cruise speed: 74 mph (119 km/h, 64 kn)
- Stall speed: 57 mph (92 km/h, 50 kn)
- Range: 830 mi (1,340 km, 720 nmi)
- Rate of climb: 260 ft/min (1.3 m/s)
- Time to altitude: 2,600 ft (792 m) in 10 minutes
- Wing loading: 9.5 lb/sq ft (46 kg/m^{2})

Armament

- Guns: 2 x machine guns
- Bombs: provision for bombs

== See also ==
Related development

- Felixstowe F.2
- Felixstowe F.5
- Naval Aircraft Factory PN
- Hall PH

Aircraft of comparable role, configuration, and era

- Phoenix P.5 Cork
- Vickers Valentia
- Supermarine Swan
- English Electric Kingston
- Hiro H1H
- Supermarine Southampton
