= 1922 United States Navy aircraft designation system =

System of aircraft labeling in the US Navy

From 1922 until 1962, the United States Navy, the United States Marine Corps and the United States Coast Guard used a system to designate their aircraft that included information about a craft's role and its manufacturer. For a listing of all such designations, see the list of United States Navy aircraft designations (pre-1962).

== Background ==
The U.S. Navy used two sequential designation systems before 1922, neither of which directly conveyed information about the aircraft's mission. The first system, adopted in 1911, consisted of a single letter signifying the manufacturer and aircraft class followed by sequential numbers for individual aircraft.

In March 1914, the Navy introduced a new system similar to hull classification symbols for warships, with an alphabetical code for the aircraft class followed by sequential numbers for individual aircraft, with the designation of the first aircraft of a particular design being used as the type designation for similar aircraft; for instance, aircraft similar to AH-8 were referred to as AH-8 type. The second system was abandoned in May 1917 without replacement; the Navy began using the manufacturers' model designations.

== The 1922 system ==
On 29 March 1922, a new designation system was introduced with a reorganization of U.S. naval aviation under the Bureau of Aeronautics. The system conveyed its information in the form:

(Mission)(Design Number)(Manufacturer)-(Subtype)(Minor Modification)

For example, F4U-1A referred to a minor modification (A) to the first major subtype (1) of Chance-Vought's (U) fourth (4) fighter (F) design.

For the first few years after the system was introduced, the manufacturer's letter and the mission letter were sometimes reversed. If it was the manufacturer's first design for that particular mission, there was no number before the manufacturer letter.

== Mission ==
The mission of the aircraft was designated by a one or two letter code. This code would also indicate whether the craft was a glider (L), helicopter (H) or lighter-than-air (Z). Duplicated codes were not in use at the same time.

== Design number ==
In cases where an aircraft was its manufacturer's first design for a particular mission, the 1 would not be written. Thus the Consolidated Catalina patrol aircraft was the PBY, not PB1Y, and the McDonnell Phantom was FH, not F1H.

== Manufacturer ==
The codes used to denote manufacturers were not unique to a single company as they were reassigned, usually when the company had either ceased operations or had not produced an aircraft for the Navy for a considerable period of time. Additionally, aircraft built under license received a separate design number than the aircraft produced by the designing company. For example, Goodyear produced the Vought F4U Corsair as the FG and the Grumman TBF Avenger torpedo bomber was produced by General Motors as the TBM. This convention extended to naval aircraft built under license in foreign nations, such as the Fairchild-Canada SBF Helldiver and Canadian-Vickers PBV Catalina.

== Minor modifications ==
Letters were occasionally appended after the design number to denote minor modifications to the subtype; e.g. adding 'N' to the Grumman F6F-5 Hellcat designated the radar-equipped night fighter version of that model: F6F-5N.

The first suffix to be used was "C" for aircraft modified for launching from an aircraft catapult on a battleship. Before World War II, the suffixes were often consecutive, with many lacking defined meanings, and they were not often used. During the war, they came into wide use and were given defined meanings, but letters were duplicated and their meanings were inconsistent. For instance, the letter "A" was used both for deletion of the tailhook from an aircraft normally so equipped (e.g. the Douglas SBD-5A, used from land bases) and for addition of this equipment to a land-based aircraft; for amphibious versions of flying boats (e.g. the Consolidated PBY-5A); for armament added to a normally unarmed type; and for miscellaneous modifications (e.g. the aforementioned F4U-1A). The addition of a tailhook to a land-based aircraft could also be designated with a "C", e.g. the North American SNJ-5C, repeating the letter previously used for catapult-launched aircraft.

A significant wartime exception to this system was existing United States Army Air Forces (USAAF) types adopted by the Navy, such as the North American B-25 Mitchell; in some such cases, the minor modification letter simply mirrored the USAAF sub-type letter, e.g. the B-25H became the PBJ-1H.

== End of the system ==
In 1962, the Department of Defense unified its aircraft designation systems along the lines of the Air Force's system. Many Navy aircraft then in service were redesignated. For many planes, the mission letters and design numbers were retained, as the Douglas AD Skyraider became the A-1 and the McDonnell F4H Phantom II became the F-4. Some aircraft design numbers were not retained, like the North American Vigilante, which was redesignated from A3J to A-5 (the A-3 designation having already been assigned to the A-3 Skywarrior).

== Similar systems ==
A very similar system, the short system, was adopted by the Imperial Japanese Navy Air Service in the late 1920s that differed only in the use of the 1 for the first assigned type, having letters assigned to match Japanese aircraft and manufacturers, and not having a different number series for each manufacturer, meaning that the A6M was the sixth model of single engine fighter (A), adopted into Imperial Navy service, which was built by Mitsubishi (M), as opposed to the US system in which it would have meant the sixth fighter model specifically from Mitsubishi.

== System examples ==
Aircraft type codes
Code	Type	Example	Period
A	Attack	AD	1946–1962
A	Ambulance	AE	1943–1962
B	Bomber	BG	1931–1946
BD	Bomber - Drone	BDR	1944
BF	Bomber - Fighter	BF2C	1934–1937
BT	Bomber - Torpedo	BTD	1942–1945
DS	Drone - Antisubmarine	DSN	1959–1962
F	Fighter	F2A	1922–1962
G	Aerial Refueling Tanker	GV	1958–1962
G	Transport, Single Engined	GK	1939–1941
H	Hospital	HE	1929–1942
H	Air-Sea Rescue	not used	1946–1962
HC	Helicopter - Crane	HCH	1952–1955
HJ	Helicopter - Utility	HJP	1944–1949
HN	Helicopter - Training	HNS	1944–1948
HO	Helicopter - Observation	HO4S	1944–1962
HR	Helicopter - Transport	HRB	1944–1962
HS	Helicopter - anti-Submarine	HSS	1951–1962
HT	Helicopter - Training	HTK	1948–1962
HU	Helicopter - Utility	HUP	1950–1962
J	Utility	JB	1928–1955
JR	Utility transport	JRM	1935–1955
KD	Drone	KDA	1945–1962
KU	Utility Drone	KUM	1945
LB	Glider Bomb (unmanned)	LBD	1941–1945
LN	Glider - Trainer	LNE	1941–1945
LR	Glider - Transport	LRW	1941–1945
M	Marine Expeditionary	EM	1922–1923
N	Trainer	N3N	1922–1946
O	Observation	O2U	1922–1962
OS	Observation Scout	OS2U	1935–1945
P	Patrol	PV	1922–1962
PT	Patrol Torpedo	not used	1922
PB	Patrol Bomber	PBY	1935–1962
PTB	Patrol Torpedo Bomber	PTBH	1937–1938
P	Pursuit	WP	1922–1923
R	Racer	R2C	1922–1928
R	Transport	R4D	1931–1962
RO	Rotocycle	RON	1954–1959
S	Scout	SC	1922–1946
S	anti-Submarine	S2F	1946–1962
SB	Scout Bomber (dive bomber)	SBD	1934–1946
SN	Scout Trainer	SNJ	1939–1946
SO	Scout Observation	SOC	1934–1946
T	Torpedo	DT	1922–1935
T	Transport	TA	1927–1930
T	Trainer	T2J	1946–1962
TB	Torpedo Bomber	TBD	1935–1946
TD	Target Drone	TDC	1942–1946
TS	Torpedo Scout	TSF	1943–1946
U	Utility	UF	1955–1962
W	airborne early Warning	WF	1952–1962
ZP	Patrol Airship	ZPG	1947–1962
ZS	Scout Airship	ZS2G	1954–1962
ZT	Training Airship	ZTG	1947–1962
ZW	airborne early Warning Airship	ZWG	1952–1962

Aircraft manufacturer codes
Code	Name	Example	Period
A	Allied	XLRA	1943
A	Atlantic/General Aviation	XFA-1	1927–1932
A	Brewster	F2A	1935–1943
A	Noorduyn	JA-1	1946
B	Bee Line	BR	1922
B	Boeing	F2B	1923–1962
B	Beechcraft	GB	1937–1962
B	Budd	RB	1942–1944
BS	Blackburn (UK)	BST	1922
C	Curtiss and Curtiss-Wright	R4C	1922–1962
C	Culver	TDC	1941–1946
C	Cessna	JRC	1943–1951
C	de Havilland Canada	UC	1955–1962
D	Douglas	R2D	1922–1962
D	McDonnell	FD	1942–1946
D	Radioplane	TDD	1943-1948
D	Frankfort	TD3D	1945-1946
DW	Dayton-Wright	SDW	1923
E	Bellanca	XRE	1931–1937
E	Cessna	OE	1951–1962
E	Detroit	TE	1928
E	Edo	OSE	1943–1962
E	Elias	EM	1922–1924
E	Hiller	YROE	1948–1962
E	Piper	AE-1	1941–1945
E	Pratt-Read/Gould	LNE	1942–1945
F	Grumman	SF	1931–1962
F	Fairchild-Canada	SBF	1942–1945
F	Fokker (Netherlands)	FT	1922
G	A.G.A. (originally Pitcairn)	XLRG	1941–1942
G	Eberhart	XF2G	1927–1928
G	Gallaudet	not used	1922–1923
G	Globe	KDG	1946–1959
G	Goodyear	F2G	1942–1962
G	Great Lakes	BG	1929–1935
H	Hall-Aluminum	PH	1928–1937
HP	Handley Page (UK)	HPS	1922–1923
H	Howard	GH	1941–1944
H	Huff-Daland	HO	1922–1927
H	McDonnell	F3H	1946–1962
H	Snead	LRH	1942
H	Stearman-Hammond	JH	1937–1939
J	Berliner-Joyce	OJ	1929–1935
J	General Aviation	PJ	1935–1937
J	North American	SNJ	1937–1962
JL	Junkers-Larson	JL	1922
K	Fairchild/Kreider-Reisner	XR2K	1935, 1937-1942
K	Kaiser-Fleetwings	XBTK	1948–1950
K	Kaman	HTK/HOK/HUK	1950–1962
K	Keystone	PK	1927–1930
K	Kinner	XRK	1935–1936
K	J. V. Martin	KF	1922–1924
K	Nash-Kelvinator	JRK	1942
L	Bell	XFL	1939–1962
L	Columbia	XJL	1944–1946
L	Langley	XNL	1940
L	Loening	OL	1923–1933
L	L.W.F.	not used	1922
M	Martin	JRM	1922–1962
M	General Motors (Eastern)	TBM	1942–1945
M	McCulloch	HUM	1951–1952
N	Gyrodyne Company	DSN	1960
N	Naval Aircraft Factory	N3N	1922–1962
O	Lockheed	R2O	1931–1942
O	Piper	UO	1955–1962
O	Viking	OO	1923–1941
P	Piasecki/P.V./Vertol	HUP	1946–1962
P	Piper	LNP	1941–1945
P	Pitcairn	OP	1931–1932
P	Spartan	NP	1940–1941
PL	Parnall (UK)	PL?	1922
Q	Bristol	XLRQ	1941–1943
Q	Fairchild	J2Q	1928–1962
Q	Stinson	XR3Q	1934–1936
R	Aeronca	LNR	1942–1946
R	American Aviation	unk. designation	1942
R	Brunswick	drone, unk. designation	1942–1943
R	Ford	JR/RR	1927–1932
R	Interstate	TDR	1942–1945
R	Maxson	NR	1939–1940
R	Radioplane	KD2R	1940–1952
R	Ryan	FR	1948–1962
RO	Meridionali Romeo (Italy)	unk. designation	1933
S	Aeromarine	AS	1922
S	Schweizer	LNS	1941
S	Sikorsky	JRS	1928–1962
S	Sperry	Drone, unk. designation	1950
S	Stearman	N2S	1934–1945
S	Stout	ST	1922
S	Supermarine	FS reserved, not used	1943
T	New Standard	NT	1930–1934
T	Northrop	F2T	1933-1937 & 1944-1962
T	Taylorcraft	LBT	1942–1946
T	Temco	KDT	1955–1962
T	Thomas-Morse	maybe not used	1922
T	Timm	N2T	1941–1943
U	Chance-Vought	F4U	1922–1962
V	Canadian Vickers	PBV	1941–1945
V	Lockheed	P2V	1942–1962
V	Vultee	SNV	1943–1945
VK	Vickers	Viking unk. designation	1923
W	Canadian Car & Foundry	SBW	1942–1945
W	Waco	XJW	1934–1945
W	Willys-Overland	unk. designation	1948–1962
W	Wright	NW	1922–1926
X	Cox-Klemin	XS	1922–1924
Y	Consolidated	PBY	1926–1954
Y	Stinson	OY	1942–1950
Y	Convair	F2Y	1954–1962
Z	Wilford/Pennsylvania	XOZ	1933–1934

== See also ==
- United States Department of Defense aerospace vehicle designation
- United States military aircraft designation systems
- British military aircraft designation systems
- Hull classification symbol
- Italian Armed Forces aircraft designation system
- Lists of military aircraft of the United States
- List of United States Navy aircraft designations (pre-1962)
- RLM aircraft designation system
- Soviet Union military aircraft designation systems
- Japanese military aircraft designation systems
- 1962 United States Tri-Service aircraft designation system
- 1962 United States Tri-Service missile and drone designation system
