= List of United States Tri-Service aircraft designations =

This list of United States Tri-Service aircraft designations includes prototype, pre-production and operational type designations under the United States Tri-Service aircraft designation system, which replaced the 1924 Air Force, 1922 Navy, and 1956 Army designation systems in 1962.

For pre-1962 Air Force aircraft designations, see List of United States Air Force aircraft designations (1919–1962). For pre-1962 Navy aircraft designations, see List of United States Navy aircraft designations (pre-1962). For aircraft that did not receive formal designations—including those procured before 1919 when no designation system was in force, and later aircraft that did not receive designations for other reasons—see List of undesignated military aircraft of the United States.

For the comparable list of post-1962 designations of rockets and missiles see 1963 United States Tri-Service rocket and guided missile designation system.

== A: Attack aircraft ==
- A-1 Skyraider – Douglas (redesignated from Navy AD)
- A-1 Skyraider II – Air Tractor/L3Harris (conflicting designation, assigned after original A-1 was retired)
- A-2 Savage – North American (redesignated from Navy AJ)
- A-3 Skywarrior – Douglas (redesignated from Navy A3D)
- A-4 Skyhawk – Douglas (redesignated from Navy A4D)
- A-5 Vigilante – North American (redesignated from Navy A3J)
- A-6 Intruder – Grumman (redesignated from Navy A2F)
- A-7 Corsair II – Ling-Temco-Vought
- A-8 – General Dynamics (unconfirmed)
- A-9 – Northrop
- A-10 Thunderbolt II – Fairchild Republic
- A-11 – skipped
- A-12 Avenger II – McDonnell Douglas/General Dynamics (not built)
- A-13 – skipped
- A-14 Super Tucano – Embraer (redesignated to A-29B)

=== Non-sequential designations ===
- A-16 – General Dynamics
- F/A-18 Hornet – McDonnell Douglas
  - F/A-18E/F Super Hornet – Boeing
  - EA-18G Growler – Boeing
- A-26 Invader – Douglas (originally designated A-26, then B-26 after the B-26 Marauder was retired, reverted to A-26 during Vietnam-era)
- A-29 Super Tucano – Embraer
- A-37 Dragonfly – Cessna (redesignated from AT-37)
- A-37 – Gulfstream (conflicting designation, redesignated from EC-37 after original A-37 was retired)

== B: Bomber ==
- B-1 Lancer – Rockwell
- B-2 Spirit – Northrop Grumman

=== Non-sequential designation ===
- B-21 Raider – Northrop Grumman (in development)
- FB-22 – Lockheed Martin (not built)
- FB-111 Aardvark – General Dynamics (redesignated F-111G after role change)

== C: Cargo/Transport ==
- C-1 Trader – Grumman (redesignated from Navy TF)
- C-2 Greyhound – Grumman
- C-3 – Martin (redesignated from Navy RM)
- C-4 Academe – Grumman
- C-5 Galaxy – Lockheed
- C-6 – Beechcraft
- C-7 Caribou – de Havilland Canada (redesignated from V-2)
- C-7 – de Havilland Canada (conflicting designation, redesignated to O-5)
- C-8 Buffalo – de Havilland Canada (redesignated from V-7)
- C-9 Nightingale/Skytrain II – McDonnell Douglas
- C-10 Jetstream – Handley Page (not built)
- C-10 Extender – McDonnell Douglas (conflicting designation, assigned after original C-10 was canceled)
- C-11 – Gulfstream
- C-12 Huron – Beechcraft
  - RC-12 Guardrail – Beechcraft
- C-13 – skipped
- C-14 – Boeing
- C-15 – McDonnell Douglas
- C-16 – skipped
- C-17 Globemaster III – Boeing
- C-18 – Boeing
- C-19 – Boeing
- C-20 – Gulfstream
  - C-20F/G/H/J – Gulfstream
- C-21 – Learjet
- C-22 – Boeing
- C-23 Sherpa – Short
- C-24 – Douglas
- C-25 – Boeing
  - C-25B Bridge – Boeing
- C-26 – Fairchild
- C-27 Spartan – Aeritalia
  - C-27J Spartan – Alenia
- C-28 Titan – Cessna
- C-29 – British Aerospace
- C-30 – skipped
- C-31 Troopship – Fokker
- C-32 – Boeing
- C-33 – Boeing
- C-34 – skipped
- C-35 – Cessna
- C-36 – reserved for a four-engined aircraft, speculated to have been the Boeing YAL-1
- C-37 – Gulfstream
  - C-37B – Gulfstream
- C-38 – Gulfstream
- C-39 – skipped
- C-40 Clipper – Boeing
- C-41 – CASA
- C-42 – skipped
- C-43 – skipped
- C-44 – skipped
- C-45 – EADS/Northrop Grumman (not built)
- C-46 Pegasus – Boeing

=== Revived 1924-1962 sequence (2005-present) ===
Only aircraft designated after the adoption of the Tri-Service system are listed below. For aircraft in the sequence designated before 1962, see List of United States Air Force aircraft designations (1919–1962) § Cargo.

- C-143 – Bombardier
- C-144 Ocean Sentry – EADS
- C-145 Skytruck – PZL
- C-146 Wolfhound – Dornier
- C-147 – de Havilland Canada

=== Non-sequential designations ===
- C-767 – Boeing
- C-880 – Convair

== D: Unmanned aerial vehicle (UAV) control segment ==
The "D" sequence is assigned to ground control stations for UAVs.

- D-1 – General Atomics, ground equipment for the MQ-1 Predator
- D-2 – Northrop Grumman, ground equipment for the RQ-4 Global Hawk
- D-3 – Northrop Grumman, ground equipment for the MQ-4C Triton
- D-4 – Northrop Grumman, ground equipment for the MQ-8 Fire Scout
- D-5 – US Navy, ground equipment for the MQ-25 Stingray

== E: Special electronic installation ==
- E-1 Tracer – Grumman (redesignated from Navy WF)
- E-2 Hawkeye – Grumman (redesignated from Navy W2F)
- E-3 Sentry – Boeing
- E-4 – Boeing
  - E-4C – Boeing/Sierra Nevada Corporation
- E-5 Eagle – Windecker
- E-6 Mercury – Boeing
- E-7 – designation proposed for EC-18B but not approved
- E-8 Joint STARS – Northrop Grumman
- E-9 Widget – de Havilland Canada
- E-10 MC2A – Boeing/Northrop Grumman
- E-11 – Bombardier/Northrop Grumman

=== Non-sequential designations ===
- E-130 – Lockheed Martin

== F: Fighter ==
- F-1 Fury – North American (redesignated from Navy FJ)
  - F-1E/F Fury – North American (redesignated from Navy FJ-4)
- F-2 Banshee – McDonnell (redesignated from Navy F2H)
- F-3 Demon – McDonnell (redesignated from Navy F3H)
- F-4 Phantom II – McDonnell Douglas (redesignated from Navy F4H and Air Force F-110)
- F-5 Freedom Fighter/Tiger II – Northrop
  - F-5G – Northrop (redesignated to F-20)
- F-6 Skyray – Douglas (redesignated from Navy F4D)
- F-7 Sea Dart – Convair (redesignated from Navy F2Y)
- F-8 Crusader – Vought (redesignated from Navy F8U)
- F-9 Panther – Grumman (redesignated from Navy F9F)
  - F-9F/H/J Cougar – Grumman (redesignated from Navy F9F-6/7/8)
- F-10 Skyknight – Douglas (redesignated from Navy F3D)
- F-11 Tiger – Grumman (redesignated from Navy F11F)
- F-12 – Lockheed
  - F-12C – Lockheed (unofficial cover designation for the SR-71)
- F-13 – skipped
- F-14 Tomcat – Grumman
- F-15 Eagle – McDonnell Douglas
  - NF-15B STOL/MTD - McDonnell Douglas
  - F-15E Strike Eagle – McDonnell Douglas/Boeing
  - F-15EX Eagle II - Boeing
  - F-15J - Mitsubishi/McDonnell Douglas
- F-16 Fighting Falcon – General Dynamics/Lockheed Martin
  - NF-16D VISTA – General Dynamics/Lockheed Martin (redesignated X-62 in 2021)
  - F-16XL – General Dynamics
- F-17 Cobra – Northrop
- F/A-18 Hornet – McDonnell Douglas
  - F/A-18E/F Super Hornet – Boeing
  - EA-18G Growler – Boeing
- F-19 – skipped
- F-20 Tigershark – Northrop (redesignated from F-5G)
- F-21 Kfir – Israel Aerospace Industries
- F-22 Raptor – Lockheed Martin
  - YF-22 – Lockheed Martin
  - FB-22 – Lockheed Martin
- F-23 – Northrop/McDonnell Douglas

=== Non-sequential designations ===
- F-35 Lightning II – Lockheed Martin (kept the X-35 prototype number)
- F-47 – Boeing
- F-117 Nighthawk – Lockheed (based on original YF-117 black project designation)

=== Other designations ===
Designations YF-110 and YF-112 through YF-116 were acquired (captured or purchased) foreign aircraft used for evaluation and aggressor training. Designations YF-117 and YF-118 were black projects, with the F-117 designation later becoming the official Tri-Service designation of the production variant of the former. These designations chronologically continued the pre-1962 "F" series.

- YF-24 – mentioned in a USAF test pilot's official biography, possibly classified
- YF-110 (not to be confused with the pre-1962 F-110 Spectre)
  - YF-110B – Mikoyan-Gurevich (captured MiG-21F-13 under Have Doughnut)
  - YF-110C – Chengdu (captured J-7B)
  - YF-110D – Mikoyan-Gurevich (captured MiG-21MF under Have Doughnut)
  - YF-110E/L/M – captured aircraft of unknown type under Have Phoenix
- YF-112
  - YF-112C/D – Sukhoi (acquired former East German Su-22M4)
- YF-113
  - YF-113A – Mikoyan-Gurevich (captured MiG-17F under Have Drill)
  - YF-113B – Mikoyan-Gurevich (captured MiG-23BN)
  - YF-113C – Shenyang (captured J-5 under Have Privilege, later reused for unknown type under Have Phoenix)
  - YF-113E – Mikoyan-Gurevich (captured MiG-23MS)
  - YF-113G – possible USAF "black project"
  - YF-113H – captured aircraft of unknown type under Have Phoenix
- YF-114
  - YF-114C – Mikoyan-Gurevich (captured MiG-17F under Have Ferry)
  - YF-114D – Mikoyan-Gurevich (captured MiG-17PF)
- YF-116
  - YF-116A – Mikoyan-Gurevich (borrowed German MiG-29 under Have Loan)
- YF-117
  - YF-117A Senior Trend – Lockheed (later made official)
  - YF-117D Tacit Blue – Northrop
- YF-118
  - YF-118G Bird of Prey – Boeing

== G: Glider ==
- G-1 – Schweizer
- G-2 – Schweizer
- G-3 – Schweizer
- G-4 – Schweizer
- G-5 – Schweizer
- G-6 – Schweizer
- G-7 – Schweizer
- G-8 – Schweizer
- G-9 – Schleicher
- G-10 – Let
- G-11 – Stemme
- G-12 – Caproni Vizzola
- G-13 – skipped
- G-14 – Aeromot
- G-15 – Schempp-Hirth
  - G-15B – Schempp-Hirth
- G-16 – DG Flugzeugbau

== H: Helicopter ==
Unlike most other categories of aircraft, the introduction of the tri-service designation system in 1962 did not result in a wholesale redesignation of helicopters. While six types received new designations in the unified, "re-started" sequence, the original "H-" series of designations that started in 1948 was also continued, and no further types of rotorcraft have been designated in the "post-1962" system.

- H-1 – Bell
  - UH-1 Iroquois – Bell (redesignated from Army HU-1 and Air Force H-40, UH-1F redesignated from H-48)
    - UH-1N Twin Huey – Bell
    - UH-1Y Venom – Bell
  - AH-1 Cobra – Bell
    - AH-1J/T/W SeaCobra/SuperCobra – Bell
    - AH-1Z Viper – Bell
- H-2 Seasprite – Kaman (redesignated from Navy HU2K)
  - H-2G Super Seasprite – Kaman
- H-3 Sea King – Sikorsky (redesignated from Navy HSS-2)
  - H-3C/E/F Sea King – Sikorsky
- H-4 – Bell (redesignated from Army HO-4)
- H-5 – Fairchild Hiller (redesignated from Army HO-5)
- H-6 Cayuse – Hughes/ McDonnell Douglas/MD Helicopters (redesignated from Army HO-6)
  - AH-6 Little Bird – Boeing
  - MH-6 Little Bird – Hughes/ McDonnell Douglas/MD Helicopters

=== Continuation of 1948 sequence ===
Only aircraft designated after the adoption of the Tri-Service system are listed below. For aircraft in the sequence designated before 1962, see List of United States Air Force aircraft designations (1919–1962) § H: Helicopter (1948–1962).

- H-46 Sea Knight – Boeing Vertol
- H-47 Chinook – Boeing Vertol
- H-48 – Bell (redesignated UH-1F)
- H-49 – Boeing Vertol (redesignated H-46B)
- H-50 DASH – Gyrodyne

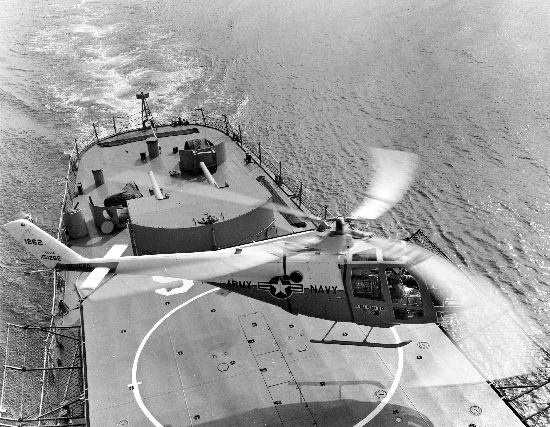
Lockheed XH-51

- H-51 – Lockheed
- H-52 Sea Guard – Sikorsky
- H-53 Sea Stallion – Sikorsky
  - MH-53 Pave Low – Sikorsky
  - CH-53E Super Stallion – Sikorsky
  - MH-53E Sea Dragon -Sikorsky
  - CH-53K King Stallion – Sikorsky
- H-54 Tarhe – Sikorsky
- H-55 Osage – Hughes
- H-56 Cheyenne – Lockheed
- H-57 Sea Ranger – Bell
- H-58 Kiowa – Bell
- H-59 – Sikorsky
- H-60 Black Hawk – Sikorsky
  - Sikorsky SH-60 Seahawk – Sikorsky
  - Sikorsky HH-60 Pave Hawk – Sikorsky
  - Sikorsky MH-60 Jayhawk – Sikorsky
- H-61 – Boeing Vertol
- H-62 – Boeing Vertol
- H-63 – Bell
- H-64 Apache – Hughes
- H-65 Dolphin – Aérospatiale
- H-66 Comanche – Boeing/Sikorsky
- H-66 Sage – Robinson (conflicting designation, assigned after the original H-66 was canceled)
- H-67 Creek – Bell
- H-68 Stingray – Agusta
- H-69 – skipped
- H-70 Arapaho – Bell
- H-71 Kestrel – Lockheed Martin
- H-72 Lakota – Eurocopter
- H-73 Koala – AgustaWestland

=== Non-sequential designations ===
- H-90 Enforcer – MD Helicopters
- H-92 – Sikorsky
  - VH-92 – Sikorsky
- H-139 Grey Wolf – AgustaWestland

== K: Tanker ==
No specialised types have been acquired to receive a stand-alone 'K for Tanker' designation; for aircraft modified for use as tankers, see the parent aircraft in the proper sequence.

== L: Laser-equipped ==
- L-1 – Boeing

== O: Observation ==
- O-1 Bird Dog – Cessna (redesignated from Air Force L-19)
- O-2 Skymaster – Cessna
- O-3 Quiet Star – Lockheed
- O-4 – reserved for a quiet observation aircraft, speculated to have been the Wren 460QB
- O-5 ARL – de Havilland Canada (redesignated from RC-7)
- O-6 – de Havilland Canada

== P: Maritime patrol ==
- P-1 – skipped
- P-2 Neptune – Lockheed (redesignated from Navy P2V)
- P-3 Orion – Lockheed (redesignated from Navy P3V)
  - EP-3 Orion/ARIES – Lockheed
  - WP-3D Orion – Lockheed
- P-4 Privateer – Consolidated (redesignated from Navy PB4Y-2/P4Y-2)
- P-5 Marlin – Martin (redesignated from Navy P5M)
- P-6 – skipped
- P-7 – Lockheed (not built)
- P-8 Poseidon – Boeing
- P-9 – De Havilland Canada

== Q: Unmanned Aerial Vehicle (UAV) ==
- Q-1 Predator – General Atomics
  - Q-1C Gray Eagle – General Atomics
- Q-2 Pioneer – AAI/Israel Aerospace Industries
- Q-3 Dark Star – Lockheed Martin/Boeing
- Q-4 Global Hawk – Northrop Grumman
  - Q-4C Triton – Northrop Grumman
- Q-5 Hunter – Israel Aerospace Industries
- Q-6 Outrider – Alliant
- Q-7 Shadow – AAI
- Q-8 Fire Scout – Northrop Grumman
  - Q-8C Fire Scout – Northrop Grumman
- Q-9 Reaper – General Atomics
- Q-10 SnowGoose – MMIST
- Q-11 Raven – AeroVironment
- Q-12 – AeroVironment
- Q-13 – skipped
- Q-14 Dragon Eye – AeroVironment
- Q-15 Neptune – DRS
- Q-16 T-Hawk – Honeywell
- Q-17 SpyHawk – MTC Technologies
- Q-18 Hummingbird – Boeing
- Q-19 Aerosonde – AAI
- Q-20 Puma – AeroVironment
- Q-20 Avenger – General Atomics (conflicting designation)
- Q-21 Integrator – Boeing Insitu
- Q-22 – AeroVironment
- Q-23 – NASC
- Q-24 – Kaman
- Q-25 Stingray – Boeing
- Q-26 – Aeronautics
- Q-27 – Boeing
- Q-28 – Skydio

=== Non-sequential designations ===
- Q-35 – Shield AI
- Q-42 – General Atomics
- Q-44– Anduril Industries
- Q-48 Talon Blue – Northrop Grumman
- Q-58 – Kratos
- Q-67 – General Atomics
- Q-72 Great Horned Owl – Northrop Grumman
- Q-170 Sentinel – Lockheed Martin

== R: Reconnaissance ==
- R-1 – Lockheed (redesignated to U-2R in 1991)

== S: Anti-submarine warfare ==
- S-1 – skipped
- S-2 Tracker – Grumman (redesignated from Navy S2F)
- S-3 Viking/Shadow – Lockheed

== S: Spaceplane ==
S is also used as a vehicle type designator spaceplanes.

- S-1 – DARPA (not built)

== SR: Strategic Reconnaissance ==
The "SR" sequence is a continuation of the original USAF bomber sequence, which ended at B-70.

- SR-71 Blackbird – Lockheed
- SR-72 – Lockheed Martin (unofficial, in development)

== T: Trainer ==
Despite the adoption of the unified Mission Designation System in 1962, only two aircraft were designated in the new sequence, both former Navy types. New trainer aircraft after 1962 continued to use the original sequence. In 1990, an alternate sequence was started, with the first designation being T-1, though the old sequence continues to be used. The next designation available in the 'T' series is T-55 or T-8, depending on which series is continued.

=== Continued original sequence (1962–present) ===
Only aircraft designated after the adoption of the Tri-Service system are listed below. For aircraft in the sequence designated before 1962, see List of United States Air Force aircraft designations (1919–1962) § T: Trainer (1948–1962).

- T-41 Gulfstream – Grumman (redesignated TC-4B, not built)
- T-41 Mescalero – Cessna (conflicting designation, assigned after the original T-41 was redesignated)
- T-42 Seminole – Beechcraft (redesignated U-8G)
- T-42 Cochise – Beechcraft (conflicting designation, assigned after the original T-42 was redesignated)
- T-43 – Boeing
- T-44 Pegasus – Beechcraft
- T-45 Goshawk – McDonnell Douglas/BAE Systems
- T-46 – Fairchild
- T-47 – Cessna
- T-48 – Cessna (not built)
- T-48 MPATS – unknown contractor (conflicting designation, assigned after the original T-48 was canceled, not built)
- T-49 – Boeing
- T-50 Golden Eagle – Korea Aerospace Industries (designation reserved, none procured)
- T-51 – Cessna
- T-52 – Diamond
- T-53 – Cirrus
- T-54 – Beechcraft

=== 1962 redesignations ===
- T-1 SeaStar – Lockheed (redesignated from Navy T2V)
- T-2 Buckeye – North American (redesignated from Navy T2J)

=== 1990 Sequence ===
- T-1 Jayhawk – Raytheon/Hawker Beechcraft
- T-2 – skipped (T-2 Buckeye was still in service)
- T-3 Firefly – Slingsby
- T-4 – skipped
- T-5 – skipped
- T-6 Texan II – Hawker Beechcraft
- T-7 Red Hawk – Boeing

=== Non-Sequential Designations ===
- T-19 Kestrel – Game Composites

== U: Utility ==
- U-1 Otter – de Havilland Canada
- U-2 – Lockheed (cover designation to hide the aircraft's true role)
- U-3 – Cessna (redesignated from Air Force L-27)
- U-4 – Aero Commander (redesignated from Air Force L-26)
- U-5 Twin Courier – Helio
- U-6 Beaver – de Havilland Canada (redesignated from Army L-20)
- U-7 Super Cub – Piper (redesignated from Army L-21)
- U-8 Seminole – Beechcraft (redesignated from Army L-23)
  - NU-8F – Beechcraft (redesignated to YU-21)
- U-9 – Aero Commander (redesignated from Army L-26)
- U-10 Super Courier – Helio (redesignated from Army L-28)
- U-11 Aztec – Piper (redesignated from Navy UO)
- U-12 – skipped
- U-13 – skipped
- U-14 – skipped
- U-15 – skipped
- U-16 Albatross – Grumman (redesignated from Air Force A-16 and Navy UF)
- U-17 Skywagon – Cessna
- U-18 Navion – North American/Ryan (redesignated from Army L-17)
- U-19 Sentinel – Stinson (redesignated from Army L-5)
- U-20 – Cessna (redesignated from Air Force C-126)
- U-21 Ute – Beechcraft
- U-22 Pave Eagle – Beechcraft
- U-23 Peacemaker – Fairchild Hiller/Pilatus
- U-24 Stallion – Helio
- U-25 Huron – Beechcraft (redesignated C-12)
- U-25 Guardian – Dassault (conflicting designation, assigned after the original U-25 was redesignated)
- U-26 Super Skywagon – Cessna
- U-27 Caravan – Cessna
- U-28 Draco – Pilatus

=== Non-sequential designations ===
- U-38 Twin Condor – Schweizer

== V: Vertical take-off/short take-off and landing (VTOL/STOL) ==
- V-1 Mohawk – Grumman (redesignated from Army AO-1)
- V-2 Caribou – de Havilland Canada (redesignated from Army AC-1, then to C-7)
- V-3 – Bell (redesignated from Air Force H-33)
- V-4 Hummingbird – Lockheed (redesignated from Army VZ-10)
- V-5 Vertifan – Ryan (redesignated from Army VZ-11)
- V-6 Kestrel – Hawker Siddeley (redesignated from Army VZ-12)
- V-7 Buffalo – de Havilland Canada (redesignated from Army AC-2, then to C-8)
- V-8 – Ryan
- V-8 Harrier – Hawker Siddeley (conflicting designation, assigned after original V-8 was retired)
  - V-8B Harrier II – McDonnell Douglas/British Aerospace
- V-9 – Hughes
- V-10 Bronco – Rockwell/Boeing
- V-11 Marvel – Parsons
- V-12 – Pilatus (not built)
- V-12 – Rockwell (conflicting designation, assigned after original V-12 was canceled)
- V-13 – skipped
- V-14 – skipped to avoid confusion with X-14
- V-15 – Bell
- V-16 Harrier – McDonnell Douglas/British Aerospace (unofficial, not built)
- V-17 – assigned to a U.S. Army project but not used
- V-18 Twin Otter – de Havilland Canada
- V-19 – assigned to a U.S. Navy project but canceled
- V-20 Chiricahua – Pilatus
- V-21 – rumored designation of an Airship Industries project
- V-22 Osprey – Bell/Boeing
- V-23 Scout – Dominion
- V-24 LightningStrike – Aurora
- V-25 ARES - Piasecki

=== Non-sequential designations ===
- V-75 Cheyenne II - Bell

== X: Special research ==
In addition to aircraft intended to support military operations, the unified system includes experimental craft designed to push the boundaries of aeronautical and aerospace knowledge. These aircraft are designated in the "X-series", which led them to become known as "X-planes". Only those designated after 1962 are listed here. Some aircraft did not have military sponsors, but since they were designated under the same sequence they are listed here. For aircraft in the sequence designated before 1962, see List of United States Air Force aircraft designations (1919–1962) § X: Special Research/Experimental (1948–1962).

- X-21 – Northrop
- X-22 – Bell
- X-23 PRIME – Martin Marietta (unofficial)
- X-24 – Martin Marietta
- X-25 – Bensen
- X-26 Frigate – Schweizer
- X-27 – Lockheed (not built)
- X-28 – (homebuilt)
- X-29 – Grumman
- X-30 – Rockwell (not built)
- X-31 – Rockwell/MBB
- X-32 – Boeing
- X-33 – Lockheed Martin (not built)
- X-34 – Orbital
- X-35 – Lockheed Martin
- X-36 – McDonnell Douglas
- X-37 – Boeing
- X-38 – NASA/Scaled Composites
- X-39 – unknown contractor (unofficial)
- X-40 – Boeing
- X-41 – unknown contractor
- X-42 – unknown contractor
- X-43 – NASA
- X-44 MANTA – Lockheed Martin (not built)
- X-44 – Lockheed Martin (conflicting designation)
- X-45 – Boeing
- X-46 – Boeing (not built)
- X-47 Pegasus – Northrop Grumman
  - X-47B – Northrop Grumman
  - X-47C – Northrop Grumman (unofficial)
- X-48 – Boeing
- X-49 SpeedHawk – Piasecki
- X-50 Dragonfly – Boeing
- X-51 Waverider – Boeing
- X-52 – skipped
- X-53 – Boeing
- X-54 – Gulfstream (in development)
- X-55 – Lockheed Martin
- X-56 – Lockheed Martin
- X-57 Maxwell – NASA (in development)
- X-58 – skipped
- X-59 QueSST – Lockheed Martin
- X-60 – Generation
- X-61 Gremlins – Dynetics
- X-62 VISTA – General Dynamics (redesignated from NF-16D in 2021)
- X-63 – Long Wall
- X-64 – Invocon
- X-65 CRANE – Aurora
- X-66 – Boeing
- X-67 - skipped
- X-68 LongShot - General Atomics Aeronautical Systems (in development)
- X-70 Fractal - NASA
- X-76 SPRINT - Bell Textron

== Z: Lighter-than-air ==
- Z-1 – Goodyear
- Z-2 Sentinel – Westinghouse/Airship Industries (not built)
- Z-3 – American Blimp
- Z-4 – Hybrid Air Vehicles

== See also ==
- F/A-XX program
- List of U.S. DoD aircraft designations
- United States military aircraft serial numbers
- List of active United States military aircraft
- List of undesignated military aircraft of the United States
- List of United States Air Force aircraft designations (1919–1962)
- List of United States Navy aircraft designations (pre-1962)
- United States military aircraft engine designations
- List of fighter aircraft
- List of maritime patrol aircraft
- List of airborne early warning aircraft
- List of tanker aircraft
- United States unified missile designation sequence
