= Italian Armed Forces aircraft designation system =

The Italian Armed Forces aircraft designation system is a unified designation system introduced by the Italian Armed Forces in 2009 for all Italian military aircraft. The system is based on the United States Armed Forces 1962 United States Tri-Service aircraft designation system.

== Designation system ==
The designation system produces a Mission-Design-Series (MDS) designation of the form:

(Status Prefix)(Modified Mission)(Basic Mission)(Vehicle Type)-(Design Number)(Series Letter)

Of these components, only the Basic Mission, Design Number and Series Letter are mandatory. In the case of special vehicles a Vehicle Type symbol must also be included.

== List of assigned aircraft designations ==
=== A - Attack ===
AV-8 - McDonnell Douglas AV-8B Harrier II

- AV-8B
- TAV-8B

A-11 - AMX International AMX

- A-11A - AMX
- TA-11A - AMX-T
- A-11B - AMX ACOL
- TA-11B - AMX-T ACOL

A-200 - Panavia Tornado

- A-200A - Tornado IDS
- TA-200A - Tornado IDS (trainer)
- EA-200B - Tornado ECR
- A-200C - Tornado post-MLU
- TA-200C - Tornado post-MLU (trainer)

=== C - Transport ===
C-27 - Alenia C-27J Spartan

- C-27J
- YEC-27J JEDI

C-42 - ATR 42

- C-42C - ATR 42-500

C-50 - Dassault Falcon 50

- VC-50A

C-130 - Lockheed Martin C-130J Super Hercules

- C-130J
- C-130J-30

C-180 - Piaggio P.180 Avanti

- VC-180A - P180 Avanti
- VC-180B - P180 Avanti II

C-222 - Aeritalia G.222

- C-222A - G.222TCM1
- C-222B - G.222TCM2
- RC-222 - G.222RM
- EC-222 - G.222VS

C-228 - Dornier 228

- UC-228 - Dornier 228

C-319 - Airbus A319

- VC-319A - A319CJ

C-900 - Dassault Falcon 900

- VC-900A - Falcon 900EX
- VC-900B - Falcon 900EASY

=== E - Electronics ===
E-550 - Gulfstream G550 CAEW

- E-550A

=== F - Fighter ===
F-16 - Lockheed Martin F-16 Fighting Falcon

- F-16A
- F-16B

F-35 - Lockheed Martin F-35 Lightning II

- F-35A - CTOL
- F-35B - STOVL

F-2000 - Eurofighter Typhoon

- F-2000A - Typhoon
- TF-2000A - Typhoon (trainer)

=== G - Glider ===
G-2 - Schempp-Hirth Ventus 2

- G-2B - Ventus 2B

G-4 - Schempp-Hirth Nimbus-4

- G-4D - Nimbus-4D
- G-4DM - Nimbus-4DM

G-17 - LAK-17

- UG-17A - LAK-17

G-21 - Caproni Vizzola Calif

- G-21S - A-21S Calif

G-103 - Grob G103 Twin Astir

- G-103 - G 103 Twin Astir

=== H - Helicopter ===
H-3 - Sikorsky SH-3 Sea King

- VH-3D - SH-3D
- SH-3D - SH-3D ASW
- UH-3D - SH-3D ASH
- HH-3F - HH-3F Pelican

H-47 - Boeing CH-47 Chinook

- CH-47C - CH-47C
- CH-47F - CH-47F Chinook

H-90 - NHIndustries NH90

- UH-90A - NH 90 TTF
- SH-90A - NH 90 NFH

H-101 - AgustaWestland AW101

- SH-101A - AW101 Maritime Patrol
- EH-101A - AW101 AEW
- UH-101A - AW101 Anti-Submarine Helicopter
- HH-101A - AW101 CSAR

H-109 - Agusta A109

- CH-109A - A109A
- CH-109B - A109A II
- CH-109D - A109C
- CH-109E - A109F
- MRH-109A - A109T
- MCH-109A - A109N

H-129 - Agusta A129 Mangusta

- AH-129A - A129
- AH-129C - A129C
- AH-129D - A129D

H-139 - AgustaWestland AW139

- HH-139A - AW139 Air Force SAR
- PH-139A - AW139 Coast Guard SAR
- UH-139A
- VH-139A - AW139 Air Force VIP
- HH-139B - AW139 Air Force SAR
- PH-139B - AW139 Coast Guard SAR
- UH-139B
- UH-139C

H-169 - AgustaWestland AW169

- UH-169A - AW169M

H-205 - Agusta-Bell AB 205

- UH-205A - AB 205

H-206 - Agusta-Bell AB 206

- RH-206A - AB 206A1
- RH-206B - AB 206B1
- RH-206C - AB 206C1

H-212 - Agusta-Bell AB 212

- UH-212 - AB 212
- HH-212A - AB 212 (AMI-SAR)
- UH-212A - AB 212 (AWTI)
- UH-212B - AB 212ASH
- SH-212B - AB 212ASW

H-249 - Leonardo Helicopters AW249

- AH-249A - AW249

H-412 - Agusta-Bell AB 412

- HH-412A - AB 412
- HH-412B - AB 412EP
- HH-412C - AB 412HP
- HH-412D - AB 412SP

H-500 - Breda Nardi NH-500E

- TH-500B - NH-500E
- OH-500A - NH-500 MC
- OH-500B - NH 500 MD

=== KC - Tanker ===
KC-707 - Boeing 707T/T

- KC-707A - 707T/T Tanker/Transport

KC-767

- KC-767A - Boeing KC-767
- KC-767B - Boeing KC-46 Pegasus

=== P - Patrol ===
P-42 - ATR 42

- P-42A - ATR42MP-400
- P-42B - ATR42MP-500

P-72 - ATR 72

- P-72A - ATR72

P-1150 - Breguet Atlantic

- P-1150A - Br.1150 Atlantic

=== Q - UAV ===
Q-1 - General Atomics MQ-1 Predator

- RQ-1B - Predator A
- MQ-1C - Predator A+

Q-7 - AAI RQ-7 Shadow

- RQ-7C - Shadow 200

Q-9 - General Atomics MQ-9 Reaper

- MQ-9A - Predator B

Q-10 - APR Strix C

- RQ-10C - Strix C
- RQ-10D - Strix D

Q-11 - AeroVironment RQ-11 Raven

- RQ-11B - Raven B
- RQ-11C - Raven DDL

Q-12 - APR Sixton

- RQ-12A

Q-24 - APR Asio-B

- RQ-24A

Q-25 - APR Spyball-B

- RQ-25A

Q-26 - APR Crex-B

- RQ-26A

Q-27 - Boeing Insitu ScanEagle

- RQ-27A - ScanEagle

Q-28 - IA-3 Colibrì quadcopter

- RQ-28A - IA-3 Colibrì

=== T - Trainer ===
T-260 - SIAI-Marchetti SF.260

- T-260A - SF.260AM
- T-260B - SF.260EA

T-339 - Aermacchi MB-339

- T-339A - MB-339A
- FT-339B - MB-339CD1
- FT-339C - MB-339CD2
- AT-339A - MB-339PAN

T-345 - Aermacchi M-345

- T-345A - M-345 HET

T-346 - Alenia Aermacchi M-346 Master

- T-346A - M-346 Master

T-2006 - Tecnam P2006T

- T-2006A- T2006A

=== U - Utility ===
U-166 - Piaggio P.166

- U-166A - P.166M
- U-166B - P.166DL3
- U-166C - P.166DP1

U-208 - SIAI-Marchetti S.208

- U-208A - S.208

== See also ==
- United States Department of Defense aerospace vehicle designation
- United States military aircraft designation systems
- British military aircraft designation systems
- RLM aircraft designation system
- Soviet Union military aircraft designation systems
- Japanese military aircraft designation systems
