= UGM =

UGM is an abbreviation that has several meanings:

- Union General Meeting, a variety of legislative body controlling the affairs of a students' union
- Universitas Gadjah Mada, university in Indonesia
- UG Madness, a webcomic about the cardgame Magic: the Gathering.
- Universal Graphics Module, a standard for connecting graphics card modules to embedded/industrial computer systems.
- Union Gospel Mission, a Christian-based homeless shelter located in cities across the country
- The US Military designation for an underwater-launched, surface attack guided missile. Examples include the UGM-133 Trident II nuclear ballistic missile and the UGM-84 Harpoon anti-ship missile.
- Abbreviation for You Got Mail (U Got Mail)
- Unknown Gun Men: this came from series of killing in the South East region of Nigeria around the year 2021
- The Ultimate Games Master UGM role-play companion app.
- UGM I and II: Viktor Rydberg's Undersökningar i Germanisk Mytologie, in two volumes, 1886-1889.
