= 1962 United States Tri-Service aircraft designation system =

US military standardized aircraft nomenclature

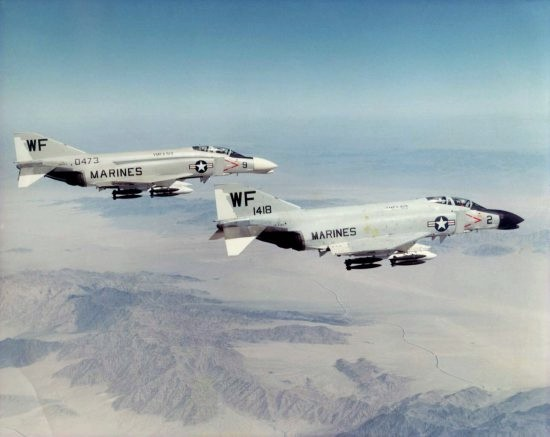
Before the introduction of the tri-service designation system, the F-4 Phantom II was designated F4H by the U.S. Navy, and F-110 Spectre by the U.S. Air Force.

The Tri-Service aircraft designation system is a unified system introduced in 1962 by the United States Department of Defense for designating all U.S. military aircraft. Previously, the U.S. armed services used separate nomenclature systems.

Under the tri-service designation system, officially introduced on 18 September 1962, almost all aircraft receive a unified designation, whether they are operated by the United States Air Force (USAF), United States Navy (USN), United States Marine Corps (USMC), United States Army (USA), United States Space Force (USSF), or United States Coast Guard (USCG). Experimental aircraft operated by manufacturers or by NASA are also often assigned designations from the X-series of the tri-service system.

The 1962 system was based on the one used by the USAF between 1948 and 1962, which was in turn based on the type, model, series USAAS/USAAC/USAAF system used from 1924 to 1948. The 1962 system has been modified and updated since introduction.

== History ==
The Tri-Service system was first enacted on 6 July 1962 by the DoD Directive 4505.6 "Designating, Redesignating, and Naming Military Aircraft" and was implemented via Air Force Regulation (AFR) 66-11, Army Regulation (AR) 700-26, Bureau of Weapons Instruction (BUWEPSINST) 13100.7 on 18 September 1962. Anecdotally, the Tri-Service system was partly brought about due to Secretary of Defense Robert McNamara's confusion and frustration with the different designation systems the Navy and Air Force used at the time which resulted in the U.S. Navy's F4H Phantom II and the U.S. Air Force's F-110 Spectre both being used to refer to, essentially, the same fighter aircraft.

The Tri-Service aircraft designation system was presented alongside the 1963 rocket and guided missile designation system in Air Force Regulation (AFR) 82-1/Army Regulation (AR) 70-50/Naval Material Command Instruction (NAVMATINST) 8800.4A (published 27 March 1974) (Note: AFR 82-1/AR 70-50/NAVMATINST 8800.4A was published to implement DoD Directive 4120.15 "Designating and Naming Military Aircraft, Rockets, and Guided Missiles" which was issued on 24 November 1971.) and the two systems have been concurrently presented and maintained in joint publications since.

The most recent changes were mandated by Joint Regulation 4120.15E Designating and Naming Military Aerospace Vehicles (Note: The most recent version is DoD Directive 4120.15E from 17 September 2020 (incorporating Change 2) which is an update of DoD Directive 4120.15E 29 November 2004) and were implemented (Note: DoDD 4120.15E is enacted by Air Force Policy Directive (AFPD) 16-4 which is implemented by AFI 16-401/AR 70-50/NAVAIRINST 13100.16) via Air Force Instruction (AFI) 16-401, Army Regulation (AR) 70-50, Naval Air Systems Command Instruction (NAVAIRINST) 13100.16 on 3 November 2020. The list of military aircraft was maintained via 4120.15-L Model Designation of Military Aerospace Vehicles until its transition to data.af.mil on 31 August 2018.

== Designation system ==
The system uses a Mission-Design-Series (MDS) designation of the form:

(Status Prefix)(Modified Mission)(Basic Mission)(Vehicle Type)-(Design Number)(Series Letter)

Of these components, only the Basic Mission, Design Number and Series Letter are mandatory. In the case of special vehicles a Vehicle Type symbol must also be included. The U.S. Air Force characterizes this designation system as "MDS", while the Navy, Marine Corps, and Coast Guard continue to refer to it as Type/Model/Series (T/M/S).

=== Status prefix ===
These optional prefixes are attached to aircraft not conducting normal operations, such as research, testing and development. The prefixes are:

- e: Digitally developed
- G: Permanently grounded
- J: Special test, temporary
- N: Special test, permanent
- X: Experimental
- Y: Prototype
- Z: Planning

A temporary special test means the aircraft is intended to return to normal service after the tests are completed, while permanent special test aircraft are not. The Planning code is no longer used but was meant to designate aircraft "on the drawing board". For example, using this system an airframe such as the F-13 could have initially been designated as ZF-13 during the design phase, possibly XF-13 if experimental testing was required before building a prototype, the YF-13; the final production model would simply be designated F-13 (with the first production variant being the F-13A). Continuing the example, some F-13s during their service life may have been used for testing modifications or researching new designs and designated JF-13 or NF-13; finally after many years of service, the airframe would be permanently grounded due to safety or economic reasons as GF-13.

=== Modified mission ===
Aircraft which are modified after manufacture or even built for a different mission from the standard airframe of a particular design are assigned a modified mission code. They are:

- A: Attack
- B: Bomber
- C: Cargo (i.e., transport)
- D: Drone director
- E: Electronic warfare
- F: Fighter
- H: Search and rescue and MEDEVAC
- K: Tanker
- L: Modified for cold weather operations
- M: Multi-mission (i.e., Special Operations)
- O: Observation
- P: Maritime patrol
- Q: Unmanned aerial vehicle
- R: Reconnaissance
- S: Anti-submarine warfare
- T: Trainer
- U: Utility
- V: VIP transport
- W: Weather reconnaissance

The multi-mission and utility missions could be considered the same thing; however they are applied to multipurpose aircraft conducting certain categories of mission. M-aircraft conduct combat or special operations while U-aircraft conduct combat support missions, such as transport (e.g., UH-60) and electronic warfare (e.g., MC-12). Historically, the vast majority of U.S. Coast Guard air assets included the H-code (e.g., HH-60 Jayhawk or HC-130 Hercules). In the 21st century, the Coast Guard has used the multi-mission designation for their armed rescue helicopters (MH-60 Jayhawk or MH-65 Dolphin).

=== Basic mission ===
All aircraft are to be assigned a basic mission code. In some cases, the basic mission code is replaced by one of the modified mission codes when it is more suitable (e.g., M in MH-53J Pave Low III). The defined codes are:

- A: Attack aircraft (for tactical air-to-surface mission)
- B: Bomber (for strategic air-to-surface mission)
- C: Cargo (i.e. Transport)
- E: Special electronic installation
- F: Fighter
- K: Tanker (dropped between 1977 and 1985)
- L: Laser-equipped
- O: Observation (Forward Air Control)
- P: Maritime patrol
- R: Reconnaissance
- S: Anti-submarine warfare
- T: Trainer
- U: Utility
- X: Special research

The rise of the multirole fighter in the decades since the system was introduced has created some confusion about the difference between attack and fighter aircraft. According to the current designation system, an attack aircraft (A) is designed primarily for air-to-surface missions (also known as "attack missions"), while a fighter category F incorporates not only aircraft designed primarily for air-to-air warfare, but also multipurpose aircraft designed also for attack missions. The Air Force has even assigned the F designation to attack-only aircraft, such as the F-111 Aardvark and F-117 Nighthawk.

The only A designated aircraft currently in the U.S. Air Force is the A-10 Thunderbolt II. The last front line A designated aircraft in the U.S. Navy and U.S. Marine Corps was the A-6 Intruder, with the only strictly A designated fixed-wing aircraft remaining in the sea services being the A-29 Super Tucano leased under the Imminent Fury program.

Of these code series, no normal aircraft have been assigned a K or R basic mission code in a manner conforming to the system.

=== Vehicle type ===
The vehicle type element is used to designate the type of aerospace craft. Aircraft not in one of the following categories (most fixed-wing aircraft) are not required to carry a type designator. The type categories are:

- D: Unmanned aerial vehicle (UAV) control segment
- G: Glider
- H: Helicopter
- Q: Unmanned aerial vehicle
- S: Spaceplane
- V: Vertical take-off/short take-off and landing (VTOL/STOL)
- Z: Lighter-than-air

A UAV control segment is not an aircraft, it is the ground control equipment used to command a UAV. Only in recent years has an aircraft been designated as a spaceplane, the proposed MS-1A.

=== Design number ===
According to the designation system, aircraft of a particular vehicle type or basic mission (for manned, fixed-wing, powered aircraft) were to be numbered consecutively, and the number series were restarted, causing some redesignated naval aircraft and subsequent new designs to overlap disused USAAC/USAAF designations (e.g., the Lockheed F-5 and Northrop F-5). Numbers were not to be assigned to avoid confusion with other letter sequences or to conform with manufacturers' model numbers. Recently this rule has been ignored, and aircraft have received a design number equal to the model number (e.g., KC-767A) or have kept the design number when they are transferred from one series to another (e.g., the X-35 became the F-35).

=== Series letter ===
Different versions of the same basic aircraft type are to be delineated using a single letter suffix beginning with "A" and increasing sequentially (skipping "I" and "O" to avoid confusion with the numbers "1" and "0"). It is not clear how much modification is required to merit a new series letter, e.g., the F-16C production run has varied extensively over time. The modification of an aircraft to carry out a new mission does not necessarily require a new suffix (e.g., F-111Cs modified for reconnaissance are designated RF-111C), but often a new letter is assigned (e.g., the UH-60As modified for Search and Rescue missions are designated HH-60G).

Some series letters have been skipped to forestall confusion with pre-1962 naval designations; for instance, there was no "H" version of the F-4 Phantom II because the aircraft type was previously designated F4H.

== Non-systematic aircraft designations ==
Since the 1962 system was introduced there have been several instances of non-systematic aircraft designations and skipping of design numbers.

=== Non-systematic or aberrant designations ===
The most common changes are to use a number from another series, or some other choice, rather than the next available number (117, 767, 71). Another is to change the order of the letters or use new acronym based letters (e.g. SR) rather than existing ones. Non-systematic designations are both official and correct, since the DOD has final authority to approve such designations.

- A-29

Briefly designated "A-14A" before being changed to "A-29B" to match the Brazilian designation.

- A-37 Dragonfly

Used the design number from its parent aircraft, the T-37 Tweet, rather than the next available number in the A series (A-8). Initially designated as the YAT-37D, using an A mission modifier and D series letter that continued the T-37 sequence, but redesignated as the YA-37A during development.

- B-21

Designated "B-21" as being the first bomber type of the 21st century, rather than the next available number in the B series (B-3).

- E-130J

Uses both the design number and suffix letter from its parent type, the C-130J Hercules, rather than the next available number in the E series (E-12).

- EA-37B

Redesignated from EC-37B to better reflect the aircraft's capabilities. The new designation conflicts with the A-37B Dragonfly.

- F/A-18 Hornet, also the transient F/A-16 and F/A-22.

Originally, the Navy planned to have two variants of the Hornet: the F-18 fighter and A-18 light attack aircraft. During development, "F/A-18" was used as a shorthand to refer to both variants. When the Navy decided to develop a single aircraft able to perform both missions, the "F/A" appellation stuck despite the designation system not allowing for slashes or other characters. AF-18 would be conformant. Similar issues existed with the naming of the F-22, which was briefly redesignated F/A-22; a proposed bomber variant was the FB-22 (which, more appropriately, should have been designated BF-22).

- F-15EX Eagle II

Uses non-standard EX series letters rather than the next available standard series letter (F-15L).

- F-35 Lightning II

Used the design number from its X-plane designation (X-35) rather than the next available F series number (24).

- FB-111 Aardvark

Should have used the next available number in the bomber sequence but 111 was retained for commonality with the F-111 from the pre-1962 system.

- F-117 Nighthawk

Designated as part of series continuing from the pre-1962 system and latterly used to identify foreign aircraft acquired by the government, e.g., YF-113 was a MiG-23. Additionally, the basic mission designation as fighter implies air-to-air capabilities though the F-117 does not possess any. There have been conjecture and anecdotal reports concerning purported air-to-air capabilities for use against Soviet AWACS craft.

- MV-75

The military designation of the Bell V-280 Valor skips designation numbers V-26 through V-74. 75 was chosen to honor the U.S. Army's founding year of 1775, and is almost in line with the helicopter sequence (though skipping 74) perhaps to signify its use as a direct successor to the H-60.

- RC-7B

Designation conflicted with unrelated C-7 Caribou. Was redesignated EO-5C in August 2004.

- SR-71

The SR-71 designator is a continuation of the pre-1962 bomber series, which ended with the XB-70 Valkyrie. During the later period of its testing, the B-70 was proposed for the Reconnaissance/Strike role, with an RS-70 designation. The USAF decided instead to pursue the Lockheed A-12 which was dubbed RS-71 (Reconnaissance/Surveillance; unrelated to the S mission designation for anti-submarine warfare). Then-USAF Chief of Staff Gen. Curtis LeMay preferred the SR (Strategic Reconnaissance) moniker and wanted the reconnaissance aircraft to be named SR-71. Before the Blackbird was to be announced by President Johnson on 29 February 1964, LeMay lobbied to modify Johnson's speech to read SR-71 instead of RS-71. The media transcript given to the press at the time still had the earlier RS-71 designation in places, creating the myth that the president had misread the aircraft's designation.

- TR-1

A variant of the U-2; uses its own modified mission letter (T for Tactical) with basic mission letter (R for Reconnaissance). The U-2 was initially designated as "utility" to obfuscate its reconnaissance capabilities. Following shootdowns of the aircraft, this subterfuge was pointless. The TR-1, first flown in 1981, was re-designated U-2R in 1991 for uniformity.

- Historical Designation Re-use: Several aircraft have received non-systematic designations as tributes to retired historically significant aircraft.
  - F-47: Boeing developed sixth-generation fighter aircraft. Designation was chosen as a tribute to the Republic P-47 Thunderbolt, the USAF's founding in 1947, and in recognition of the support of Donald Trump—the 47th President of the United States—for the project.
    - The P-47 was re-designated as F-47 in 1947 when the pursuit (P) designation was replaced by fighter (F).
    - The Fairchild Republic A-10 Thunderbolt II also pays tribute to the P-47.
  - OA-1K Skyraider II: Designated to "[renew] the rugged and versatile nature" of the long-retired and unrelated A-1 Skyraider, of which the A-1J was the last production variant, rather than using the next available number in the A series (14).
  - T-6 Texan II: Turboprop training aircraft. Design numbers 4 and 5 of the Training vehicle type were skipped in order to pay tribute to the earlier North American T-6 Texan.
- Civilian model number usage: Numerous series numbers have been skipped to use civilian model numbers.
  - KC-767: Skipped hundreds of C-series numbers to use Boeing's model number. Has conformant basic mission and modified mission letters. Only used for aircraft sold to foreign air forces. The U.S. Air Force ordered the Boeing 767-based tanker KC-46.
  - MH-90 Enforcer: armed version of the MD 900 and MD 902 for the United States Coast Guard. Flown by the Helicopter Interdiction Tactical Squadron between 1998 and 2000.
  - MH-139 Grey Wolf: security and support missions variant of the AW139 for the United States Air Force.
  - TH-66 Sage: military training variant of the Robinson R66 for the U.S. Army FAA Part 141 Helicopter Flight School Pilot Program. Aircraft shares the same vehicle type and design number (H-66) as the Boeing-Sikorsky RAH-66 Comanche.
  - UC-880: aerial tanker variant of the Convair 880 operated by the United States Navy.
  - VH-92: presidential transport variant of the Sikorsky S-92 operated by the United States Marine Corps.

=== Skipped design numbers ===
The design number "13" has been skipped in many mission and vehicle series for its association with superstition. Some numbers were skipped when a number was requested and/or assigned to a project but the aircraft was never built.

The following table lists design numbers in the 1962 system which have been skipped.

Mission or Vehicle Series	Missing numbers	Next available number
A	8^{#}, 11, 13	14
B	3–20	22
C	13, 16, 30, 34, 36, 39, 42–44†	47
D (Ground)		5
E		12
F	13, 19‡	24
G	13	18
H (original sequence)	36, 38, 44, 45, 69	74
H (alternate sequence)		7
L		2
O		7
P	1, 6	10
Q	13	31
R		2
S (ASW)	1	4
S (Spaceplane)		2
T (1990 sequence)	2*, 4**, 5**	8
V	13, 14, 17, 19, 21	26
Z		5

#: A-8 was technically skipped, but the AV-8 Harrier received the number within the "V" vehicle type sequence. Within the V sequence, it should have been designated AV-12 (as the Ryan XV-8 "Fleep" was already in existence). Additionally, the stillborn 1960s General Dynamics Model 100 attack aircraft proposal has been referred to as the A-8A, but it is unclear if it was ever formally granted this designation by the USAF.
†: The C-42 through C-44 designations were skipped in favor of the KC-45 by Airbus. The designations are considered skipped as the sequence continued in with the C-46 rather than continuing from the last otherwise sequential designation.
‡: A top-secret stealth fighter designated F-19 has been rumored to exist for decades, and the rumors gained widespread publicity after the USAF cordoned off a crash site near Nellis Air Force Base in July 1986, but the crashed aircraft was subsequently revealed to have been an F-117, which was still classified at the time. No conclusive evidence of a genuine F-19 program has surfaced.
*: Skipped to avoid confusion with the North American T-2 Buckeye, which was still in service at the time.
**: The T-4 and T-5 designations were skipped in favor of T-6 by Raytheon to honor the WW2-era North American T-6 Texan. The designations are considered skipped as the sequence continued with the T-7 rather than continuing from the last otherwise sequential designation.

== Manufacturer's code ==
Since 1939, a 2-letter manufacturer's code has been added to designations to identify the manufacturer and the production plant. For example, F-15E-50-MC, the "MC" being the code for the McDonnell Douglas plant at St. Louis, Missouri.

== Block number ==
In 1941, block numbers were added to designations to show minor equipment variations between production blocks. The block number appears in the designation between the model suffix and manufacturers code (for example F-100D-85-NH). Initially, they incremented in numerical order −1, −2, −3 but this was changed to −1, −5, −10, −15 in increments of five. The gaps in the block numbers could be used for post-delivery modifications—for example, a F-100D-85-NH could be modified in the field to F-100D-86-NH. Not all types have used block numbers.

== See also ==
- List of United States Tri-Service aircraft designations
- British military aircraft designation systems
- Hull classification symbol
- Italian Armed Forces aircraft designation system
- Japanese military aircraft designation systems
- Lists of military aircraft of the United States
- RLM aircraft designation system
- Soviet Union military aircraft designation systems
- United States military aircraft designation systems
