= United States Department of Defense aerospace vehicle designation =

Designation scheme for aerospace systems in the U.S. Armed Forces

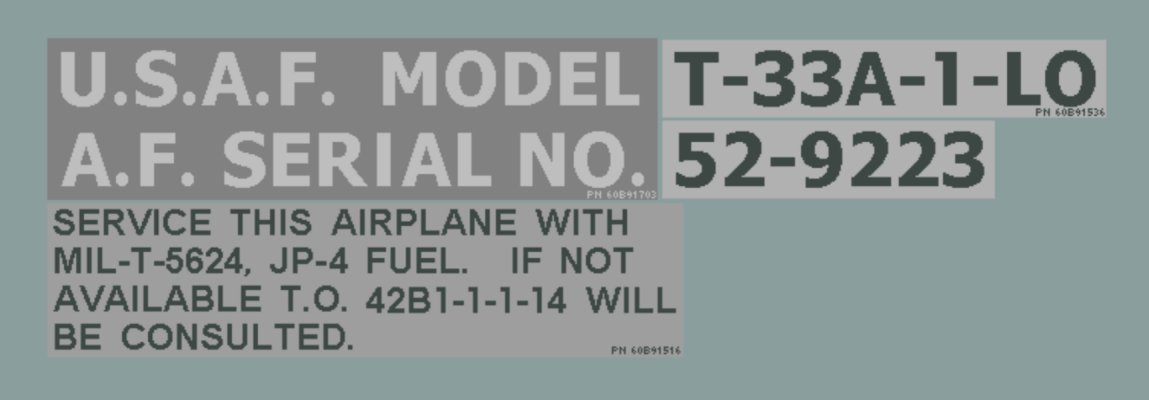
Typical Vehicle Designation Stencil for a USAF aircraft. This one is on the port side of a T-33A under the canopy frame.

Joint Regulation 4120.15E: Designating and Naming Military Aerospace Vehicles is the current system for designating all aircraft, helicopters, rockets, missiles, spacecraft, and other aerial vehicles in military use by the United States Armed Forces.

== History ==
United States Department of Defense Directive 4120.15 "Designating and Naming Military Aircraft, Rockets, and Guided Missiles" was originally issued November 24, 1971 and named the Air Force as the Executive Agent empowered to carry out the directive. Directive 4120.15 was implemented by Air Force Regulation (AFR) 82-1/Army Regulation (AR) 70-50/Naval Material Command Instruction (NAVMATINST) 8800.4A on March 27, 1974. The Joint Regulation designation system was heavily based upon the 1962 US Tri-Service aircraft designation system but also took control of the previously separate designation system for missiles and drones.

The current version was enacted by Joint Regulation 4120.15E Designating and Naming Military Aerospace Vehicles (Note: The most recent version is DoD Directive 4120.15E from September 17, 2020 (incorporating Change 2) which is an update of DoD Directive 4120.15E signed November 29, 2004) and was implemented (Note: DoDD 4120.15E is enacted by Air Force Policy Directive (AFPD) 16-4 which is implemented by AFI 16-401/AR 70-50/NAVAIRINST 13100.16) via Air Force Instruction (AFI) 16-401, Army Regulation (AR) 70-50, Naval Air Systems Command Instruction (NAVAIRINST) 13100.16 on November 3, 2020. The list of US military aircraft was kept via 4120.15-L Model Designation of Military Aerospace Vehicles 31 August 2018 until its transition to data.af.mil.

== Overview ==
There are two basic components to a craft's identity: its vehicle designation and its popular name. A vehicle designation is sometimes referred to as a Mission Design Series (MDS), referring to the three main parts of the designation that combine to form a unique profile for each vehicle. The first letters (up to four) signify the type of craft and its mission. The design number, preceded by a dash "-", essentially signifies the product design of the aircraft (i.e. design 16 in F-16A). The series number identifies the specific "production model of a particular design number" with subsequent series indicating major revisions or changes. Finally, there may be variant and block identifiers which clarify the exact configuration of the vehicle.

The popular name is a matter of less specific construction, but is aimed at providing an official common name which eases identification and communication regarding the vehicle. The popular name is not used in official internal publications (an official internal report would refer to the "F-16" and "AIM-9" but not mention the names "Fighting Falcon" or "Sidewinder"). The popular name may be based on the manufacturer's internal name for the craft but all popular names must have the manufacturer's permission and be approved by the DoD. Pilots often have their own nicknames for their aircraft which may bear only coincidental resemblance (if that) to the official popular name, although some pilot nicknames are similar or even derived from the official popular name (such as "Bug" and "Super Bug" for the F/A-18 Hornet and F/A-18E/F Super Hornet).

There are seven potential components of a system's MDS designation as well as three potential components which are not included in the MDS.

MDS components
Component	Meaning	Example
Status Prefix	(Optional) prefix to denote vehicles with unique status, such as non-flying or experimental	"X" in XWC-130J denotes experimental
Modified Mission	(Optional) additional mission identifier which clarifies or notes modification of the basic mission (not used in missiles/rockets)	"W" in XWC-130J denotes weather-related modified mission
Launch environment (missile/rocket only)	Identifies method of launch for missiles and rockets	"A" in AGM-158 denotes air-launched
Mission	Identifies the basic design mission of the craft	"C" in XWC-130J denotes cargo mission
Vehicle Type	(Optional) identifier used for non-standard vehicle types	"H" in UH-60 denotes helicopter
Design Number	Number assigned to each design of the same mission type, with a dash separating the mission and design number	"130" in XWC-130J
Series	Letter suffix to indicate which series within a design the vehicle belongs to	"J" in XWC-130J

Additional components not in the MDS
Component	Meaning	Example
Configuration/Component Number	Specifies configuration changes made to the aircraft which affect handling, maintenance, etc.	
Block Number	Specifies a production group of aircraft built by the manufacturer	KC-135 Block 45
Serial Number	Identifies the specific aircraft being discussed	68-10357 (see below)

== Aircraft designation ==
=== Status prefix ===
Status Prefix	Definition
E	Digitally developed. Vehicles that are developed in a digital environment.
G	Grounded. Applied to aircraft which are permanently grounded, most often used for ground training of crews and support. This is only applied as a permanent designation. Use is rare.
J	Temporary Special Test. Applied to craft involved with special testing of temporarily installed equipment. The J Prefix is used for aircraft that can be reasonably returned to their original configuration following tests. An example is aircraft used as testbeds for new electronics, but which will or may not retain that equipment after tests are complete.
N	Permanent Special Test. Applied to craft involved with special testing on a permanent basis, with modifications to their configuration that make return to original configuration impractical. Many military aircraft transferred to NASA for aeronautical research carry this designation.
X	Experimental. Applied to craft which are not yet accepted for service, or to prototypes for which standard configuration has not been finalized. Most prototypes of the past carried this prefix, but it should not be confused with craft given an X basic mission symbol. The X status prefix is for designs for other missions, but at an experimental stage of the design process. An example shown earlier is the XWC-130J.
Y	Prototype. Originally applied to demonstration craft where configuration had been determined, but from the 1970s on applied to all prototypes of aircraft intended for production. An example would be the prototype YF-22
Z	Planning. Applied to designs in the planning/pre-development phase.

=== Modified mission symbols ===
Many craft have been designed for more specific missions than their basic mission symbol would indicate, and many design series have been designed for different missions than the original design, and may or may not still maintain capability for the original mission. The modified mission symbol provides the services the ability to accurately indicate a craft's mission without losing commonality with the basic design MDS. If utilized, the modified mission symbol is placed as a prefix directly in front of the basic mission symbol (but after any applicable status prefix, see above). Modified mission symbols are not used for rockets and missiles. Currently authorized modified mission symbols are:

Modified Mission Symbols	Definition
A	Attack. Similar to the basic mission symbol, A applies to aircraft modified to attack land or sea targets. Example is the AC-130U Spectre, a transport modified for ground attack missions.
C	Cargo. Similar to the basic mission symbol, C applies to aircraft modified to carry cargo and passengers. An example is the CT-39A, a T-39A modified for carrying cargo.
D	Director. Applies to aircraft modified to control unmanned aerial vehicles such as drones. An example is the DT-2B a T-2B modified to control drones.
E	Electronics. Applies to aircraft modified with addition of extensive electronic equipment, either for enhancement of their basic mission, or as a platform for specifically electronic missions such as providing electronic countermeasures (ECM), airborne early warning (AEW), airborne command and control (ACC), or communications relay. Example is the EP-3A Orion, a patrol aircraft outfitted with special electronics to collect electronic data.
F	Fighter. Similar to the basic mission symbol, F applies to aircraft modified to engage in air combat. The FA-18 and FA-22 are special examples of this. (Note: The F/A-18 Hornet uses an unofficial designation to highlight the fact that its multi-role capabilities were built in from the earliest stages (as opposed to a hypothetical AF-18: a fighter modified for the attack role), however other comparable aircraft, such as the F-16 and later F-15s do not seem to have even gained a modified mission A, instead remaining with their F designation. This is the case even with the F-15E Strike Eagle, an F-15 variant used primarily in the attack role. It should also be noted that the system specifically forbids the use of slashes and other characters, and the Hornet is referred to in official documentation as the FA-18, which implies an attack aircraft modified for the fighter role. The F-22 Raptor was designated "F/A-22" for two years from 2003-2005 before being redesignated F-22 immediately before being transitioned to active service status. A strike version of the F-22 was mooted with the designation FB-22.)
H	Search and Rescue. Similar to the basic mission symbol, H applies to aircraft modified to assist search and rescue (SAR) operations. Example is the HU-25 Guardian, a utility transport modified for Coast Guard search and rescue coordination.
K	Tanker. Applies to aircraft modified to carry and transfer aviation fuel in flight to other aircraft. Example is the KA-6D Intruder, an attack aircraft modified with tanks and hoses to provide aerial refueling.
L	Cold Weather. Applies to aircraft modified to operate in Arctic or Antarctic environments. Example is the LC-130, a transport modified to deliver logistics support to Antarctic stations.
M	Multi-Mission. Applies to aircraft modified to perform various missions, in particular special operations modifications. Also used as a catch all for missions that neither fit in any category, nor warrant their own. An example would be the MC-130H, a cargo aircraft modified to support special operations needs.
O	Observation. Applies to aircraft modified to perform observation of enemy or potential enemy positions, forward air control (FAC), and patrol borders or areas of potential infiltration. Example is the OA-10A, an attack aircraft modified to provide observation of enemy territory.
P	Patrol. Similar to the basic mission symbol, P applies to aircraft modified to perform maritime patrol. Example is the P-3 Orion.
Q	Drone. Applies to craft modified to operate unmanned, under control of ground or air directors or autonomously. Example is the QF-106 Delta Dart, a fighter modified to fly under remote control as a target for missile testing.
R	Reconnaissance. Similar to the basic mission symbol, R applies to aircraft modified to perform air reconnaissance of enemy forces, territory, and facilities. Example is the RF-5E Tiger II, a fighter with added reconnaissance cameras and equipment for photographing enemy positions.
S	Anti-Submarine. Similar to the basic mission symbol, S applies to aircraft modified to search for, locate, and attack enemy submarines like the SZ-1A
T	Training. Similar to the basic mission symbol, T applies to aircraft modified for use as trainers, both initial and operational. Examples are two-seat operational training versions of single-seat aircraft, such as the TA-4J and TF-102. Fully combat-capable two-seaters are usually simply assigned a new series letter.
U	Utility. Similar to the basic mission symbol, U applies to aircraft modified to allow use as utility and base support aircraft. An example is the UC-12B, modified for utility by adding a cargo door.
V	Staff/VIP. Applied to aircraft modified for transport of staff and ranking personnel with furnishment of comfortable accommodations. Example is the VC-25, a 747 modified to serve as the Presidential transport, or Air Force One.
W	Weather. Applied to aircraft modified for weather monitoring and air sampling to detect nuclear, biological, and chemical contamination and for intelligence gathering on foreign nuclear testing. An example is the WC-135.

=== Basic mission symbol ===
The basic mission symbol is the heart of the mission part of the designation. No designation is without it, and some designations consist of only a basic mission symbol for the mission part, such as the F-14 or C-130. The following are the officially authorized basic mission symbols:

A
Attack. Attack craft are designed to directly attack enemy land or sea targets, interdict enemy movements and support, and strike precision targets. Examples are the A-6 Intruder and A-10 Thunderbolt II.

B
Bomber. Bombers are designed to attack strategic and tactical targets with heavy bomb loads and missiles. They carry heavy loads of free-fall and stand-off weaponry. Examples are the B-52 Stratofortress and B-2A Spirit.

C
Cargo. Transports are designed to carry cargo and passengers to provide tactical logistical support and strategic mobility to other forces. Examples are the C-2 Greyhound and C-130 Hercules.

E
Electronic. Electronics craft are designed explicitly to fulfill electronic specialty missions such as ECM, ACC, AEW, and communications. Examples are the E-2 Hawkeye and E-3 Sentry.

F
Fighter. Fighters are designed to intercept and engage enemy aircraft and missiles. It is also a catch-all for multi-mission aircraft, even if it is primarily designed for ground-attack purpose. Examples are the F-22 Raptor and F-16 Fighting Falcon.

L
Laser. Laser craft are those that are primarily designed to employ laser weaponry against air and ground targets. This is a very new designation, and only applies to the AL-1 airborne laser (ABL) program.

O
Observation. Observation craft are designed to maintain observation over land, primarily territory either held by enemy forces or susceptible to infiltration. Unlike reconnaissance craft, they loiter over area providing observation over time. Examples are the O-1 Bird Dog and OV-10 Bronco.

P
Patrol. Patrol craft are designed for maritime reconnaissance missions, including anti-submarine warfare. Example is the P-3 Orion.

R
Reconnaissance: Reconnaissance craft are designed to conduct reconnaissance through photographic and electrical means, example SR-71. (Note: The original designation of the SR-71 Blackbird, RS-71 was specifically allowed for in the original system, standing for Reconnaissance and Surveillance - or, it is sometimes said, Reconnaissance and Strike (but is unrelated to anti-submarine warfare). USAF Chief of Staff Curtis LeMay simply liked the sound of SR-71 better than RS-71, and made changes to President Johnson's speech to read as SR-71. The SR was explained as Strategic Reconnaissance.)

S
Anti-submarine: Anti-submarine warfare (ASW) craft are designed to locate and attack enemy submarines. Example is the S-3 Viking.

T
Trainer: Trainers are aircraft used to train aircrews. Examples are the T-6 Texan II and T-45 Goshawk.

U
Utility: Utility craft are utilized for miscellaneous missions and base support, like the U-3A. The U designation has also been used to obfuscate an aircraft's true purpose or capabilities, like with the U-2.

X
Research: Research craft are designed for experimental and developmental research programs. Unlike the X mission modifier, the X basic mission symbol is used for craft solely designed for this purpose, with no operational mission intended or feasible. Examples are the entire series of X-planes from the Bell X-1 on.

=== Vehicle type symbols ===
For non-standard vehicle types (vehicles other than piloted, fixed-wing and self-propelled aircraft which are wholly supported by aerodynamic lift from liftoff to touchdown), a final symbol is added after the basic mission symbol to identify the vehicle type. Current applicable symbols are as follow:

D
UAV Control Segment. Equipment used to control unmanned aircraft. An example is the MD-1A, used to launch, control, and recover the MQ-1 and MQ-9 drones.

G
Glider. A glider is a fixed-wing aircraft designed to use air currents for normal lift, although it may have an engine. An example is the TG-15A training glider.

H
Helicopter. A helicopter is any rotary-wing aircraft, like the UH-60.

Q
Unmanned. An unmanned aerial vehicle (UAV) is any aircraft without capacity for a human pilot, but not applied to missiles or rockets. Examples include MQ-1 Predator and RQ-11. (Note: There is some confusion concerning drone designation as examples like MQ-1 provide a modified mission designator ("M") but not the basic mission modifier (which is typically required). An example given in 4120.15E reinforces that as GMQ-1B is illustrated as "G" for status prefix, "M" for modified mission, basic mission is left blank, and "Q" for vehicle type.)

S
Spaceplane. A spaceplane is a vehicle designed to fly beyond earth's atmosphere and return. This vehicle code was poorly chosen, as it conflicts with the mission code S (Anti-Submarine Warfare). "ES" could equally designate a spaceplane designed specifically for electronic warfare or an anti-submarine plane modified for that purpose.

V
V/STOL. A Vertical and/or Short Takeoff and Landing aircraft is designed to take-off and land vertically, but not rely on rotary-wing lift for flight. This includes vectored thrust aircraft such as the AV-8 Harrier and tiltrotors such as the V-22 Osprey. It also applies to aircraft of the normal fixed-wing configuration that are capable of taking off and landing in a short runway space, such as the OV-10 Bronco.

Z
Lighter than air. A lighter than air craft is designed to remain aloft through buoyancy of lighter than air gases. Such craft include blimps and balloons. An example is the SZ-1A.

=== Design number ===
The design number is separated from the earlier components by a dash. Design numbers run consecutively from 1 to 999.

=== Series ===
The series letter follows the design number and progresses consecutively starting with A. In the event the series letter "Z" is used, the design number will progress to the next unused number and series will begin again at "A". To avoid confusion, series "I" and "O" are not used.

=== Additional Components ===
==== Configuration/Component number ====
Configuration/component numbers signify changes that "affect performance, tactics, or integral components of a weapon system." They appear to the right of the series symbol and are separated from the series symbol by a dash.

==== Block number ====
The block number specifies a group of aircraft produced to the same specifications by the manufacturer. Block numbers are assigned in multiples of 5 (01, 05, 10). An example is F-16C Block 25.

==== Serial number ====
Serial numbers are located on the tail and identify a specific aircraft. For example, MH-53M Pave Low IV serial number 68-10357 was the Pave Low which carried the mission commanders during the Sơn Tây raid. For more information on serial numbering of military aircraft, see United States military aircraft serial numbers.

== Rockets/missiles ==
=== Status prefix ===
Status prefix is an optional prefix not always used for vehicles in regular service. If used, it is the first letter in the MDS. Authorized current status prefixes are:

e
Digitally developed. Vehicles that are developed in a digital environment.

C
Captive. Only used for rockets and missiles, C applies to rockets/missiles that are designed to be carried in their launch environment but are incapable of being launched/fired. They may contain guidance and control electronics but the engine and warhead are typically inert or ballasted.

D
Dummy. Only used for rockets and missiles which are non-flying, primarily for ground training. All guidance, control electronics, engine, and warhead are inert or ballasted.

J
Temporary Special Test. Applied to craft involved with special testing of temporarily installed equipment. The J prefix is used for aircraft that can be reasonably returned to their original configuration following tests. An example is aircraft used as testbeds for new electronics, but which will or may not retain that equipment after tests are complete.

N
Permanent Special Test. Applied to craft involved with special testing on a permanent basis, with modifications to their configuration that make return to original configuration impractical. Many military aircraft transferred to NASA for aeronautical research carry this designation.

X
Experimental. Applied to craft which are not yet accepted for service, or to prototypes for which standard configuration has not been finalized. Most prototypes of the past carried this prefix, but it should not be confused with craft given an X basic mission symbol. The X status prefix is for designs for other missions, but at an experimental stage of the design process.

Y
Prototype. Originally applied to demonstration craft where configuration had been determined, but from the 1970s on applied to all prototypes of aircraft intended for production.

Z
Planning. Applied to designs in the planning/pre-development phase.

=== Rocket/missile launch environment ===
All rockets and missiles contain a symbol to indicate the launch method, be it from the air, ground, sea, etc. The following are the currently authorized symbols for launch environments. These are not used for other aerospace vehicles.

A
Air-launched. The missile is launched from an airborne vehicle. Example is the AIM-9 Sidewinder dogfighting missile.

B
Multiple. The missile can be launched from various environments. The BGM-109 Tomahawk, for instance, can launch from a ground unit, aircraft, or ship-mounted launcher.

C
Coffin. Stored in an unhardened container horizontally or less than 45 degree angle and either launched horizontally or raised vertical for launch. Coffin launchers may be either on land or at sea. An example is the CGM-16 ICBM.

F
Individual. The missile is launched by an individual soldier in the field, otherwise referred to as man-portable. Example is the FIM-92 Stinger, a light man-portable surface-to-air missile (SAM).

G
Ground. The missile is launched directly from the ground surface, including runways.

H
Silo-Stored. The missile stored vertically in a silo but raised to ground level for launch. An example is the Atlas-F.

L
Silo-Launched. The missile is launched from its storage silo, below ground.

M
Mobile. The missile is launched from a mobile ground vehicle or movable platform.

P
Pad. Like a traditional space rocket, the missile is stored and launched from an unprotected or partially protected ground facility.

R
Ship. The missile is launched from a ship or barge.

S
Space. The missile is launched from a spacecraft. This is so far used only for the upper stage of another rocket like the SSB-8 Centaur.

U
Underwater. The missile is launched from a submarine or underwater device.

=== Rocket/missile mission symbol ===
Rockets and missiles are assigned a single mission symbol, which usually denotes the intended target type of the missile. For most types of missile, the combination of launch environment and mission symbols form a from-to combination (surface-to-air, ship-to-submarine) that gives one a good idea of the potential uses for the missile.

C
Transport. Applies to vehicles designed to carry cargo and deliver it to a location. This can also be used to designate a carrier for electronics or weapons systems.

D
Decoy. Applies to vehicles that function as decoys for defeating enemy anti-aircraft and anti-missile defenses.

E
Electronics. Applies to vehicles that carry out electronic missions such as communications or countermeasures.

G
Ground. Applies to vehicles designed to attack surface targets, including vehicles.

I
Intercept. Applies to vehicles designed to attack aerial targets, in an offensive or defensive capacity.

L
Launch detection/surveillance. Applies to vehicles designed to detect launch of missiles and track and identify enemy aircraft and missiles. This also applies to detection and monitoring of space launches and re-entry.

M
Scientific/Calibration. Applies to vehicles designed to collect scientific data.

N
Navigation. Applies to vehicles which provide navigational assistance.

Q
Drone. Applies to a vehicle designed to be remotely controlled. Ballistic/semi-ballistic vehicles, cruise missiles, and artillery projectiles are not considered drones.

S
Space support. Applies to vehicles designed to support space programs and activities.

T
Training. Applies to aircraft used in training.

U
Underwater Attack. Applies to vehicles designed to attack submarines and underwater targets.

W
Weather. Applies to vehicles designed to obtain weather data and collect aerial samples.

=== Vehicle type symbol ===
For rockets and missiles, the vehicle type symbol identifies the basic vehicle type and will be the final symbol in the mission part of the MDS.

B
Booster. Boosters are primary or auxiliary propulsion units for other vehicles.

M
Guided Missile. Guided missiles are unmanned vehicles flying a path controlled by a guidance system.

N
Probe. Probes are non-orbital unmanned vehicles designed primarily to collect data within the aerospace environment.

R
Rocket. Rockets are single-use unmanned vehicles without guidance after launch.

S
Satellite. Satellites are space vehicles which orbit the earth and used to collect and transmit various data.

=== Design number ===
The design number is separated from the earlier components by a dash. Design numbers run consecutively from 1 to 999.

=== Series ===
The series letter follows the design number and progresses consecutively starting with A. In the event the series letter "Z" is used, the design number will progress to the next unused number and series will begin again at "A". To avoid confusion, series "I" and "O" are not used.

=== Additional Components ===
Configuration/Component number

Configuration/component numbers signify changes that "affect performance, tactics, or integral components of a weapon system." They appear to the right of the series symbol and are separated from the series symbol by a dash.

Block number

The block number specifies a group of aircraft produced to the same specifications by the manufacturer. Block numbers are assigned in multiples of 5 (01, 05, 10).

Serial number

Serial numbers are located on the tail and identify a specific rocket/missile. For more information on serial numbering of military aircraft, see United States military aircraft serial numbers.

== Exceptions ==
- The F-117 Nighthawk does not currently have any air-to-air capabilities but was not designated A-117. There has been conjecture and anecdotal reports concerning purported air-to-air capabilities targeted toward destroying Soviet AWACS craft.
- The OA-1K Sky Warden is designated as a new version of the unrelated A-1 Skyraider of which the last version was the A-1J.
- Although the mission letters of the AV-8 Harrier's designation are correct, the series number was already used in the Ryan XV-8 ("Fleep") if following the system, the Harrier would have been named AV-12.
- The "FB-111" was originally a fighter that was adapted to the bomber role. Thus it should have been designated BF-111.
- The CC-130J Hercules referred to the stretched C-130J-30 Hercules. The -30 suffix was not supportable in the system, so a modified mission letter had to be added. Hence, the CC-130J is a cargo aircraft "modified" for the cargo role. This was later dropped. The CC-130J should not be confused with the CC-130 Hercules operated by the Royal Canadian Air Force. The first "C" identifies the aircraft as a Canadian asset. Canada later acquired C-130Js as CC-130Js.
- Many manufacturers have used non-standard modifiers for commercial purposes; for instance, the Spanish F/A-18 Hornets were 'designated' EF-18 by McDonnell Douglas (the E standing for España, the native name for Spain, and AH-64D Apache helicopters were designated 'WAH-64' by licensed manufacturer Westland. Non-standard series letters, especially ones the U.S. Air Force has no intention of progressing to, are often used to designate the intended country of use, such as I (Israel - e.g. F-15I), J (Japan), K (South Korea or United Kingdom), S (Saudi Arabia) and SG (Singapore).

== See also ==
- United States military aircraft designation systems
- 1962 United States Tri-Service aircraft designation system
- 1963 United States Tri-Service missile and drone designation system
- List of U.S. DoD aircraft designations
- List of US DoD MDS designators for missiles, rockets, probes, boosters, and satellites
- List of undesignated military aircraft of the United States
