= United States military aircraft engine designations =

The United States military aircraft engine designation system was introduced in 1926. Originally for piston engines, it was expanded in 1947 to include a separate system for jet and rocket engines.

== Piston engines ==
A piston engine designation has three separate elements, a type prefix, a number representing engine displacement and a model number.

Type Prefix
The type prefix is based on the engine disposition:

H	H engine
L	Inline
O	Opposed
R	Radial
V	V engine
W	W engine
X	X engine

Some early engines had the type letter prefixed by a modification letter

- G - geared
- I - inverted
- S - supercharged

Displacement
A number related to the engine displacement within 5 cubic inches.

Model Suffix

Letters were used between 1926 and 1933 then suffixes were numerals with odd number for Army and later Air Force engines and even numbers for Navy engines. After 1943 the letters AN were included to indicate the engine met both Army/Air Force and Navy requirements. Some engines fitted with water-injected engines had the W added to the suffix.

For example, the Curtiss V-1150-1 is a Vee-type engine with a displacement of 1150 cubic inches and is an Army model.

== Jet engines ==
A jet engine designation consists of four separate elements in the format TSS-MM-NN where T is the type letter, SS is the sequence number, MM is the manufacturer designation (one or two characters), and NN is the model number:

Type letter

A	Adaptive cycle engine
J	Turbojet engine
T	Turboprop or Turboshaft
TF or F	Turbofan

The prefixes X for experimental and Y for service test are used.

Sequence number
Each type has its own sequences. Engines initially developed for the US Navy used even num starting at 30, while US Army/Air Force engines used odd numbers beginning with 31.
After 1968, the sequences were separated by service with each new sequence beginning with 00. The leading digits were "1" for an engine developed for the Department of the Air Force, "4" for an engine developed for the Department of the Navy, and "7" for an engine developed for the Department of the Army.

Manufacturer designation

A	Allison Engine Company
AC	Allis-Chalmers
AJ	Aerojet
B	Buick
BO	Boeing
CW	Curtiss-Wright
F	Ford
FF	Frederic Flader
G	Garrett AiResearch
GE	General Electric
GN	Giannini
K	Kellog
L	Lycoming
LA	Lockheed
LD	Avco Lycoming
MA	Marquardt
MN	Mensasco
NH	Northrop-Hendy
OEL	Orenda
P	Pratt & Whitney / United Aircraft of Canada
R	Fairchild
RM	Reaction Motors
T	Continental
V	Packard
W	Wright
WE	Westinghouse

Model number
Odd numbers for the United States Air Force and even numbers for the United States Navy

For example, the TF39-GE-1C is a Turbofan built by General Electric and was an Air Force model, which has powered the Lockheed C-5 Galaxy and the Pratt & Whitney TF30-P-414A is a turbofan built by Pratt & Whitney and was a Navy model, which has powered the Grumman F-14A Tomcat.

== Rocket engines ==
Have a similar system to jet engines but use three basic types:

LR	Liquid-fuel
PS	Pulsejet
RJ	Ramjet

The prefixes X for experimental and Y for service test are used.

== See also ==
- United States military aircraft designation systems
