= British military aircraft designation systems =

Aircraft type

British military aircraft designations are used to refer to aircraft types and variants operated by the armed forces of the United Kingdom.

Since the end of the First World War, aircraft types in British military service have generally been known by a service name (e.g. 'Spitfire'), with individual variants recognised by mark numbers, often in combination with a letter to indicate the role. This is in contrast to identification systems used in countries such as the United States, where an aircraft type is primarily identified by an alphanumeric designation.

The British military aircraft designations (e.g. 'Spitfire Mark V' or 'Hercules C3') should not be confused with the military aircraft registration (also known as its "serial") used to identify individual aircraft (e.g. XR220), nor with U.S. aircraft designations (e.g. C-5, C-17, MQ-9) or manufacturer's designations (e.g. Sikorsky S-58, Jaguar B, WS-61, AW139, WAH-64), though mark numbers were used to indicate aircraft built for other nations e.g. Hawker Hunter Mk.58 was a Hunter F.6 for the Swiss Air Force.

No designation system was introduced during World War I that covered more than the products of a single manufacturer. The Admiralty frequently referred to designs by the serial of the first aircraft of that type to be accepted for service.

== The military designation system ==
In this system, which has been used since the end of World War I, each aircraft designation consists of a name, (sometimes) a role prefix, and a mark number.

A unified official naming system was introduced in February 1918 by the Ministry of Munitions, the scheme would use classes of names related to the role. Fighter aircraft were to be animals, plants or minerals; bomber aircraft were to have geographical names; and 'heavy armoured machines' would be personal names from mythology. The classes were further divided by size of aircraft and land or sea-based, for example a three-seater sea-based fighter would be named after shellfish. Italian towns were to be used for single-seat land-based bombers.

Following the formation of the Royal Air Force (RAF) in April 1918, the Ministry of Munitions introduced a new system as Technical Department Instruction 538. They mainly followed the February 1918 scheme, but certain names already used for engines were excluded, for example birds of prey were used by Rolls-Royce for their aero-engines. The names related to zoology, geography, and mythology were withdrawn in 1927, and the Air Ministry introduced names with the initial letters relating to role, for example C for troop carriers as used by the Handley Page Clive. A further change was made in 1932 and 1939, to use more appropriate names. Fighters were to use "General words indicating speed, activity or aggressiveness", and trainer aircraft would be "words indicating tuition and places of education".

Bombers were to be named after inland towns in the British Empire, for example the Avro Lancaster and Fairey Battle (after Battle, East Sussex, the site of the Battle of Hastings). With the introduction of helicopters, these were to be named after trees but only the Bristol Sycamore was named in this scheme. (Note: The sycamore tree is known for its distinctive winged seeds which spin as the fall)

=== Names ===
The name ('type name') of an aircraft type would be agreed between the Air Ministry or Admiralty and the manufacturer or importer when the order was placed. Names generally followed one or a number of patterns:

- Alliteration was particularly common; e.g. aircraft from Vickers-Armstrongs were given names starting with V, Hawker Aircraft, names starting with H, etc. This began during the First World War, when aircraft manufacturers were given an initial pairing of letters to use in the naming of their aircraft: e.g. Boulton Paul Ltd were given 'Bo'. From this, and the requirement to use the names of birds or insects for fighter aircraft, their first in-house fighter design was the Boulton Paul Bobolink. For bombers the additional requirement was a place-name, hence the Boulton Paul Bourges; and its contemporaries; the Airco DH.10 Amiens and Vickers Vimy (Bourges, Amiens and Vimy all being in France).
- Heavy bombers received the names of cities and towns: Short Stirling, Avro Lancaster, and Handley Page Halifax. Likewise transport aircraft also received the names of cities and towns: Avro York, Vickers Valetta, Handley Page Hastings, and Blackburn Beverley.
- Flying boats were given the names of coastal or port communities: Saro London, Supermarine Stranraer, and Short Sunderland.
- Land-based maritime patrol aircraft were named for naval explorers: Avro Anson (Admiral George Anson), Lockheed Hudson (Henry Hudson), Avro Shackleton (Ernest Shackleton), and Bristol Beaufort (Francis Beaufort).
- Aircraft for army co-operation and liaison and gliders were given names associated with mythological or legendary leaders; e.g.: Westland Lysander, Airspeed Horsa, General Aircraft Hamilcar, and Slingsby Hengist. A sense of irony was present when some of the names were chosen as Hengist and Horsa were the mythical leaders and founders of England when the Angles, Saxons, and Jutes invaded the British Isles in the 5th century.
- American aircraft, whether purchased directly or sourced under Lend-Lease, were given American-themed names following established patterns, e.g.: the Martin Baltimore and Consolidated Catalina. The American services, with the exception of the U.S. Navy, were not generally in the habit of giving aircraft names, and many British-chosen names would later be adopted; e.g.: the North American P-51 Mustang began life as the North American Mustang Mk.I with the Royal Air Force. U.S. Navy names, conversely, were being increasingly adopted by the Fleet Air Arm as 1942 and 1943 progressed, as in the case of the Grumman F4F Wildcat shedding its alternative Fleet Air Arm 'Martlet' name in favour of 'Wildcat', the original American naval name.
- Naval versions of aircraft not originally ordered for the Fleet Air Arm were given the prefix 'Sea', such as with the Hawker Sea Hurricane and de Havilland Sea Venom, while Seafire for the navalised Supermarine Spitfire was a contraction of 'Sea Spitfire'. Sometimes, the naval version entered service without a corresponding land-based type doing so, as with the Hawker Sea Fury and de Havilland Sea Vixen.
- Naval aircraft ordered as such had names with a nautical theme; e.g.: Supermarine Walrus, Blackburn Roc, and Fairey Gannet. Torpedo bombers were given 'fish' names; e.g.: Blackburn Shark, Fairey Swordfish, and Fairey Barracuda. Mythological names, particularly with an association with water were common, such as Blackburn Iris, named for the goddess of sea and sky, and Nimrod the mighty hunter, used for the Hawker Siddeley Nimrod and Hawker Nimrod (a 1930s carrier fighter). Nimrod aside, many naval fighters were named for birds; such as the Fairey Flycatcher, Fairey Fulmar, Blackburn Skua and, before the aforementioned adoption of the U.S. Navy's existing names for Fleet Air Arm aircraft of American origin, Grumman Martlet (the martlet being a heraldic bird) for the F4F fighter.
- Training aircraft were given names related to academic institutions: Airspeed Oxford, North American Harvard, Boulton Paul Balliol, and Fairchild Cornell. As with other American aircraft purchased, appropriate US names were used; the Harvard and Cornell universities. Alternative names for teachers were also used; De Havilland Dominie, Percival Provost, Miles Magister, and Percival Proctor.
- Aircraft built for one role, such as the Avro Anson or Armstrong Whitworth Albemarle, but converted to other roles, rarely changed their names. However significant changes in a design might result in a name change; the extensive redesign of the Avro Manchester from two engines to four was renamed Avro Lancaster, which was in turn renamed Avro Lincoln (initially Lancaster Mark.IV) as the design was improved, however the Lincoln had more in common with the Manchester than the late models of Spitfire did with the early versions so it was not consistent.
- A trend might also be followed by a manufacturer; Hawker Hurricane, Typhoon, Tornado, and Tempest.
- Where civilian aircraft types have been taken into service, their existing names or alphanumeric designations have often (though not always) been retained; e.g.: the Vickers VC10 or Lockheed TriStar.

The systems began to change in the immediate post-Second World War period, with the V bombers and types such as the Supermarine Scimitar. The RAF's three post-war jet-engined, swept wing strategic bombers were given names beginning with 'V' – Vickers Valiant, Avro Vulcan, and Handley Page Victor (the V bombers).

=== Role prefixes ===
British military aircraft prefixes
Prefix	Description	Example with mark
A	airborne (paratroop transport)	Halifax A.VII
ABR	amphibian boat reconnaissance	Supermarine Sea Otter ABR.1
AEW	airborne early warning	Sentry AEW.1
AH	army helicopter	Westland Lynx AH.7
AL	army liaison	Islander AL.1
AOP	airborne observation post	Auster AOP.9
AS	anti-submarine	Gannet AS.1
ASR	air-sea rescue	Sea Otter ASR.II
ASaC	airborne surveillance and control	Sea King ASaC.7
B	bomber	Vulcan B.2
B(I)	bomber interdictor	Canberra B(I).8
B(K)	bomber/tanker	Valiant B(K).1
B(PR)	bomber/photo reconnaissance	Valiant B(PR).1
B PR(K)	bomber/photo reconnaissance/tanker	Valiant B(PR)K.1
B(SR)	bomber/strategic reconnaissance	Victor B(SR).2
C	transport	Hercules C.4
CC	communications transport	BAe 125 CC.3
COD	courier – later carrier – onboard delivery	Gannet COD.4
C(PR)	transport/photo reconnaissance	Pembroke C(PR).1
D	drone (pilotless aircraft)	Shelduck D.1
DW	mine exploding ('directional wireless')	Wellington DW.1
E	electronics (particularly electronic warfare)	Canberra E.15
ECM	electronic counter-measures	Avenger ECM.6
F	fighter	Typhoon F.2
FA	fighter/attack	Sea Harrier FA.2
FAW	fighter, all-weather	Javelin FAW.9
FB	fighter-bomber	Sea Fury FB.11
FG	fighter/ground attack	Phantom FG.1
FGA	fighter/ground attack (superseded by FG)	Hunter FGA.9
FGR	fighter/ground attack/reconnaissance	Phantom FGR.2
FR	fighter/reconnaissance	Hunter FR.10
FRS	fighter/reconnaissance/strike	Sea Harrier FRS.1
GA	ground attack	Hunter GA.11
GR	general reconnaissance (to 1950, superseded by MR)	Lancaster GR.III
GR	ground attack / reconnaissance	Harrier GR.9
GT	glider tug	Master GT.II
HAR	helicopter, air rescue	Sea King HAR.3
HAS	helicopter, anti-submarine	Sea King HAS.2
HC	helicopter, cargo	Chinook HC.2
HCC	helicopter, communications	Squirrel HCC.1
HF	high-altitude fighter (Spitfire only)	Spitfire HF.VII
HM	helicopter, maritime	Merlin HM.1
HMA	helicopter, maritime attack	Lynx HMA.8
HR	helicopter, rescue	Dragonfly HR.5
HT	helicopter, training	Griffin HT.1
HU	helicopter, utility	Sea King HU.4
K	tanker	VC10 K.4
KC	tanker / cargo	TriStar KC.1
L	low-altitude fighter (Seafire only)	Seafire L.III
LF	low-altitude fighter (Spitfire only)	Spitfire LF.XVI
Met	meteorological reconnaissance (superseded by W)	Hastings Met.1
MR	maritime reconnaissance	Nimrod MR.2
MRA	maritime reconnaissance and attack	Nimrod MRA.4
NF	night fighter	Venom NF.2
PR	photographic reconnaissance	Canberra PR.9
R	reconnaissance	Sentinel R.1
RG	reconnaissance / ground attack	Protector RG.1
S	strike (nuclear capability)	Buccaneer S.2
SR	strategic reconnaissance	Victor SR.2
ST	special transport	Albemarle ST.VI
T	training	Hawk T.1
TF	torpedo fighter	Beaufighter TF.X
TR	torpedo/reconnaissance	Sea Mosquito TR.33
TT	target tug	Canberra TT.18
TX	training glider	Cadet TX.3
U	drone (pilotless aircraft) – (superseded by D)	Meteor U.15
W	weather research (single aircraft, withdrawn 2001)	Hercules W.2

=== Mark numbers ===
Starting in the interwar period, variants of each operational type were usually indicated by a mark number, a Roman numeral added to the type name, usually preceded by 'Mark', or its abbreviated form 'Mk.' or 'Mk', e.g.: Fury Mk.I. Mark numbers were allocated sequentially to each new variant, the new mark number signifying a 'major' change such as a new engine-type. Sometimes, an alphabetic suffix was added to the mark number to indicate a minor change, e.g.: Bulldog Mk.IIA. Occasionally, this letter indicated a change in role, e.g.: the Blenheim Mk.I bomber was adapted to the Blenheim Mk.IF long-range fighter. Sometimes a minor but otherwise significant change in an aircraft would necessitate a new mark number, e.g., when the Lancaster I was fitted with Packard-built Merlin engines, which used a different make of carburettor from the Rolls-Royce-built ones, the Lancaster I became a Lancaster III. Otherwise, these two aircraft were identical in appearance and performance, and normally indistinguishable from each other but needed to be identified differently for maintenance.

During the Second World War, as aircraft ordered for one purpose became adapted to a multitude of roles, mark numbers became prefixed with letters to indicate the role of that variant. Aircraft of the same mark that were adapted for different purpose would then be differentiated by the prefix. For instance the Defiant Mk.I was adapted to a night fighter, the Defiant NF Mk.II, some of which were later converted to target tugs as the Defiant TT Mk.II. Where there was a Sea- variant, this would have its own series of mark numbers, e.g.: the Seafire Mk.I was derived from the Spitfire Mk.V.

Occasionally, other 'minor' but nonetheless important changes might be denoted by series numbers, preceded by 'Series', 'Srs.', or 'Srs', e.g.: Mosquito B Mk.IV Series I / B Mk.IV Series II – the different series number denoting the introduction, after a few initial production aircraft, of extended engine nacelles to eliminate buffeting. This design change was made standard on all subsequent production Mosquitoes. The series number denoted a revision during the production run of a particular mark. This again could then have an additional letter-suffix; e.g.: the Halifax Mk.II Series IA.

Export variants of British military aircraft are usually allocated mark numbers (sometimes without a role prefix) from a higher range of numbers, usually starting at Mark 50. A converse convention was adopted for the Canadian-designed de Havilland Canada DHC-1 Chipmunk, where the sole British service variant was designated Chipmunk T.10.

Up until the end of 1942, the RAF always used Roman numerals for mark numbers, sometimes separated from its 'mark' abbreviation by a period (full stop). 1943 to 1948 was a transition period, during which new aircraft entering service were given Arabic numerals for mark numbers, but older aircraft retained their Roman numerals. From 1948 onwards, Arabic numerals were used exclusively. Thus, the Spitfire PR Mk.XIX became the PR Mk.19 after 1948. With this change, the Sea- variants were allocated their own range within one common series for all variants; e.g.: the Hawker Fury Mk.I was followed by the Sea Fury F.10, Sea Fury FB.11 etc.

More recently, mark numbers have not always been used sequentially, but instead used to highlight differences in equipment installed. Specific examples include aerial refuelling tankers; the RAF Voyager is either designated as KC2, indicating two Cobham 905E underwing hose and drogue refuelling pods, whereas the KC3 indicates a total of three hose and drogue refuelling units (two underwing, and an additional centreline Cobham 805E Fuselage Refuelling Unit), there was never any 'mark 1' variant of the Voyager.

=== Format of designation ===
The system has been largely unchanged since 1948, with the addition of more prefixes as new roles have arisen.

For example, the first Lockheed Hercules variant in Royal Air Force service was the Hercules C.1 ('Cargo, Mark 1'). A single example was adapted for weather monitoring purposes and became the Hercules W.2. The fuselage-lengthened variant became the Hercules C.3. For aircraft with a long service life, as their function evolves over time, the designation letters and sometimes the mark digit will change to reflect this. The practice of restarting the mark numbers for the naval variant where the name was changed continued; e.g., the naval version of the Hawker Siddely Harrier, the BAe Sea Harrier, marks started again at FRS Mk.1, whilst variants where the name was unchanged for the naval version such as the Lynx have a single set of numbers for both land and naval variants. In the case of the Sea King, which began as a naval aircraft, the RAF kept the name and it also has a single set of numbers.

The post-1948 mark numbers are variously presented in full, e.g.: Hercules C Mk.3; or abbreviated, e.g.: Hercules C3 forms; and either with or without a full stop between the prefix and mark number. The use of the 'Mark' or 'Mk.' has gradually been dropped.

== Other designation systems used for UK military aircraft ==
=== Specification numbers ===
From 1920 to 1949, most aircraft had an associated Air Ministry specification number. Prototype aircraft would be produced under contract, and would be referred to by manufacturer name and specification number. If accepted, they would get a service name. For example, the 'Fairey 6/22' was built to meet the 6th specification issued in the year 1922; it was subsequently accepted as the Fairey Flycatcher. Later, a preceding letter was added to the specification number to identify the type of aircraft; e.g.: specification B.28/35 for a bomber was the 28th specification issued in 1935; in this case the specification was specifically written for the Bristol 142M, a modification of Bristol's Type 142 private venture civil aircraft (Britain First) for military use as a bomber, which would enter service as the Bristol Blenheim Mk.I light bomber.

=== Manufacturers designations ===
From about 1910, the largest single designer of aircraft for the British Army's Royal Flying Corps (RFC) was the Royal Aircraft Factory. The Royal Aircraft Factory designated its types according to either the layout of the aircraft or its role; e.g.: Royal Aircraft Factory S.E.5, the 'S.E.' prefix representing 'scouting experimental'. In practice, successful Royal Aircraft Factory designs were largely built by other manufacturers, though still known by the Royal Aircraft Factory designations.

Some examples of manufacturers designations and the corresponding service designations are shown below:

- Avro 549A = Aldershot II;
- Vickers VC10 Type 1180, the tenth 'Vickers Civil' design, were (Type 1106) VC10 C1 transports converted to have additional tanker role; known in service as Vickers VC10 C1K;
- Westland WAH-64 Apache = Apache AH1.

=== US designations ===
For some aircraft types in the UK armed services which originate from established U.S. military aircraft; e.g., the Boeing C-17 Globemaster III, which is currently known in RAF service as the 'C-17 Globemaster III', have used the original US designation, rather than assigning a UK specific designation.

== See also ==
- List of aircraft of the Royal Air Force
- List of active United Kingdom military aircraft
- United Kingdom military aircraft registration number
- Japanese military aircraft designation systems
- United States Department of Defense aerospace vehicle designation
- Soviet Union military aircraft designation systems
