= 1963 United States Tri-Service rocket and guided missile designation system =

Designation system for rockets

In 1963, the U.S. Department of Defense established a designation system for rockets and guided missiles jointly used by all the United States armed services. It superseded the separate designation systems the Air Force and Navy had for designating US guided missiles and drones, but also a short-lived interim USAF system for guided missiles and rockets.

== History ==
On 11 December 1962, the U.S. Department of Defense issued Directive 4000.20 “Designating, Redesignating, and Naming Military Rockets and Guided Missiles” which called for a joint designation system for rockets and missiles which was to be used by all armed forces services. The directive was implemented via Air Force Regulation (AFR) 66-20, Army Regulation (AR) 705-36, Bureau of Weapons Instruction (BUWEPSINST) 8800.2 on 27 June 1963. A subsequent directive, DoD Directive 4120.15 "Designating and Naming Military Aircraft, Rockets, and Guided Missiles", was issued on 24 November 1971 and implemented via Air Force Regulation (AFR) 82-1/Army Regulation (AR) 70-50/Naval Material Command Instruction (NAVMATINST) 8800.4A on 27 March 1974. Within AFR 82-1/AR 70-50/NAVMATINST 8800.4A, the 1963 rocket and guided missile designation system was presented alongside the 1962 United States Tri-Service aircraft designation system and the two systems have been concurrently presented and maintained in joint publications since.

The current version of the rocket and missile designation system was mandated by Joint Regulation 4120.15E Designating and Naming Military Aerospace Vehicles (Note: The most recent version is DoD Directive 4120.15E from September 17, 2020 (incorporating Change 2) which is an update of DoD Directive 4120.15E November 29, 2004) and was implemented (Note: DoDD 4120.15E is enacted by Air Force Policy Directive (AFPD) 16-4 which is implemented by AFI 16-401/AR 70-50/NAVAIRINST 13100.16) via Air Force Instruction (AFI) 16-401, Army Regulation (AR) 70-50, Naval Air Systems Command Instruction (NAVAIRINST) 13100.16 on 3 November 2020. The list of military rockets and guided missiles was maintained via 4120.15-L Model Designation of Military Aerospace Vehicles until its transition to data.af.mil on 31 August 2018.

== Explanation ==
The basic designation of every rocket and guided missile is based in a set of letters called the Mission Design Series. The sequence indicates the following:

- An optional status prefix
- The environment from which the weapon is launched
- The primary mission of the weapon
- The type of weapon

Examples of guided missile designators are as follows:

- AGM – (A) Air-launched (G) Surface-attack (M) Guided missile
- AIM – (A) Air-launched (I) Intercept-aerial (M) Guided missile
- ATM – (A) Air-launched (T) Training (M) Guided missile
- RIM – (R) Ship-launched (I) Intercept-aerial (M) Guided missile
- LGM – (L) Silo-launched (G) Surface-attack (M) Guided missile

The design or project number follows the basic designator. In turn, the number may be followed by consecutive letters, representing modifications. The numbers are assigned sequentially for each weapon type, while the launch environment and primary mission letters may be swapped in variants where those are changed (for example in the air-launched AIM-7 Sparrow and ship-launched RIM-7 Sea Sparrow) without incrementing the number.

Example:

RGM-84D means:
- R – The weapon is ship-launched;
- G – The weapon is designed to surface-attack;
- M – The weapon is a guided missile;
- 84 – eighty-fourth missile design;
- D – fourth modification;

In addition, most guided missiles have names, such as Harpoon, Tomahawk, Sea Sparrow, etc. These names are retained regardless of subsequent modifications to the missile.

== Code ==
First letter designating launch environment
Letter	Launch environment	Detailed description
A	Air	Carried and launched by an airplane, helicopter, or other aerial vehicle
B	Multiple	Capable of being launched from more than one platform without significant modifications
C	Coffin or Container	Stored horizontally or at less than a 45-degree angle in a non-hardened enclosure and launched from the ground
F	Individual or Infantry	Carried and launched by one man
G	Ground	Other ground-launched, mainly from a runway
H	Silo-stored	Stored vertically in a silo but raised to ground level for launch.
L	Land or Silo	Launched from a fixed site or hardened silo
M	Mobile	Launched from a ground vehicle or movable platform
P	Soft Pad	Partially or unprotected in storage and launched from a fixed surface location
R	Surface ship	Launched from a surface vessel such as a ship, barge, etc.
S	Space	Launched from a vehicle that operates outside earth's atmosphere. Only used for space launch vehicle stages
U	Underwater	Launched from a submarine or other underwater device

Second letter designating mission symbol
Letter	Mission	Detailed description
C	Transport	Vehicle designed for transporting items from one place to another. Never used in active service
D	Decoy	Vehicles designed or modified to confuse, deceive, or divert enemy defenses by simulating an attack vehicle
E	Special Electronic	Vehicles designed or modified with electronics equipment for communications, countermeasures, electronic radiation sounding, or other electronic recording or relay missions
G	Surface Attack	Vehicles designed to destroy enemy land or sea targets
I	Intercept-Aerial	Vehicles designed to intercept aerial targets in defensive roles
L	Launch Detection	Vehicles designed for detecting and tracking satellites and missiles
M	Scientific	Vehicles designed for scientific purposes. Never used in active service
N	Navigation	Vehicles to provide data for navigation purposes
Q	Drone	Vehicles designed for target reconnaissance or surveillance, or a target drone
S	Space	Vehicles designed to support or destroy space-based targets
T	Training	Vehicles designed or permanently modified for training purposes. Only used for modifications
U	Underwater attack	Vehicles designed to destroy enemy submarines or other underwater targets, or to detonate underwater
W	Weather	Vehicles designed to observe, record, or relay data pertaining to meteorological phenomena

Third letter designating vehicle type symbol
Letter	Vehicle type	Detailed description
B	Booster	A system to provide thrust for a satellite, missile, or aerospace vehicle. Only used in formal documents.
M	Guided Missile	An unmanned, self-propelled vehicle with remote or internal trajectory guidance
N	Probe	A non-orbital instrumented vehicle used to monitor and transmit environmental information
R	Rocket	A self-propelled vehicle whose flight trajectory cannot be altered after launch (Note: Notwithstanding this definition, the designation is also used for guided modifications of unguided rockets, e.g. the AGR-19/AGR-20/AGR-21 Advanced Precision Kill Weapon System, which is a guided version of the Hydra 70 rocket and itself includes the AGR-20F variant, which is primarily intended for air intercept and should otherwise be designated AIM-.)
S	Satellite	A vehicle placed in orbit. Only used in formal documents, and replaced by the 2023 Space Force naming system.

== Prefixes ==
Additionally, a prefix may be added to the designation indicating a non-standard configuration.

Optional Non-Standard Prefix
Letter	Vehicle type	Detailed description
e	Digitally Developed	System developed in a virtual environment.
C	Captive	Functional but inert vehicle incapable of being fired.
D	Dummy	Non-flyable vehicle for ground crew training.
J	Temporary Special Test	Vehicles temporarily modified for special test purposes.
N	Permanent Special Test	Vehicles permanently modified for special test purposes.
X	Experimental	Experimental vehicle
Y	Prototype	Prototype vehicle
Z	Planning	Vehicle that is still in the planning phase.

For example:

- YAIM-54A
- XAIM-174B

== See also ==
- List of missiles
- List of missiles by country § United States
- 1962 United States Tri-Service aircraft designation system
- United States military aircraft designation systems
