= United States military aircraft designation systems =

Systems used by the United States to assign identifiers to aircraft in service

Multiple designation systems have been used to specify United States military aircraft. The first system was introduced in 1911 by the United States Navy, but was discontinued six years later; the first system similar to that used today was designed in 1919 when the US Army's Aeronautical Division became the United States Army Air Service. Before this, aircraft were put into service under their manufacturers' designations.

== History ==
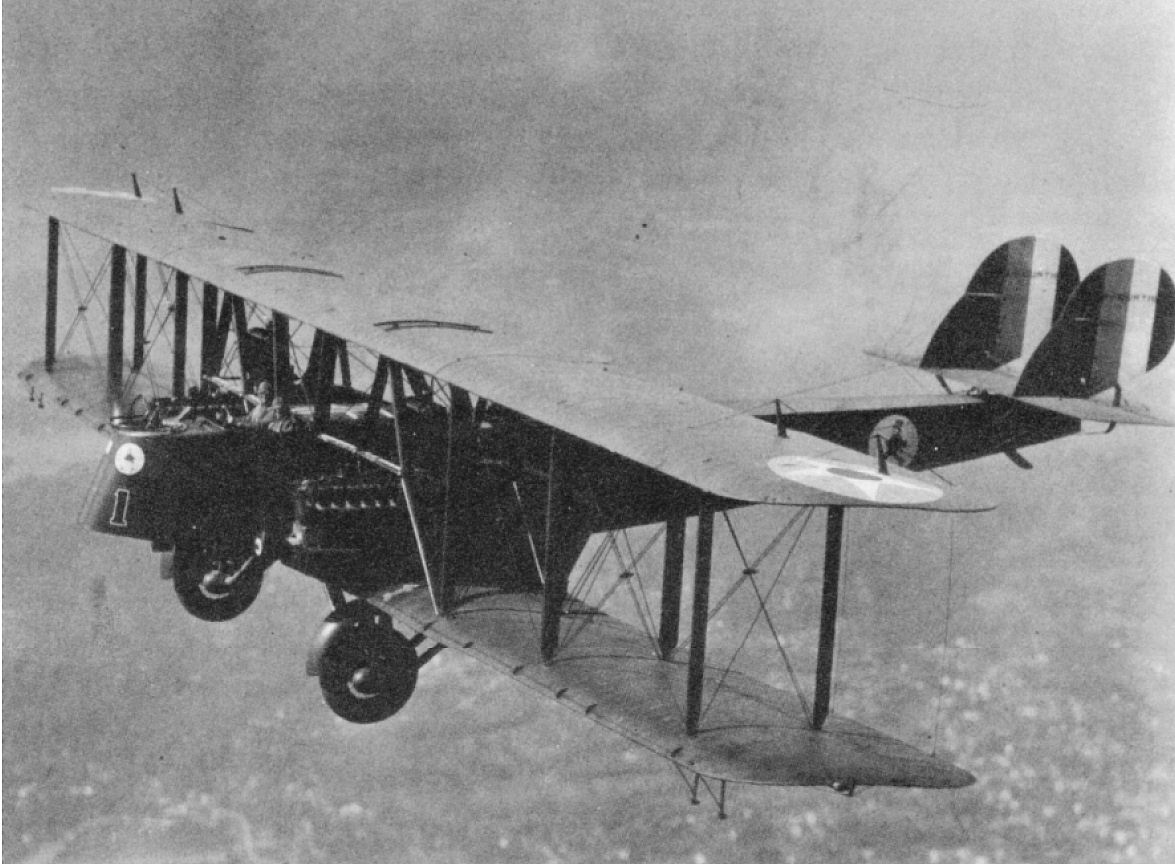
Martin NBS-1 bomber of the 11th Bombardment Squadron

=== United States Army Air Service system 1919–1924 ===
During this period, type designations used by the United States Army Air Service consisted of a two or three letter abbreviation of the aircraft's purpose. Examples include GA for Ground Attack aircraft, NO for Night Observation aircraft, and NBS for Night Bombardment, Short Distance aircraft.

=== Army aviation system 1924–1962 ===
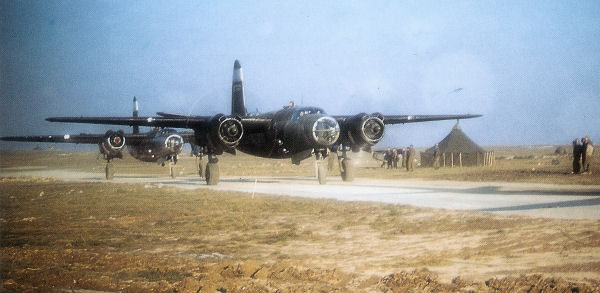
Martin B-26s of the 323rd Bombardment Group

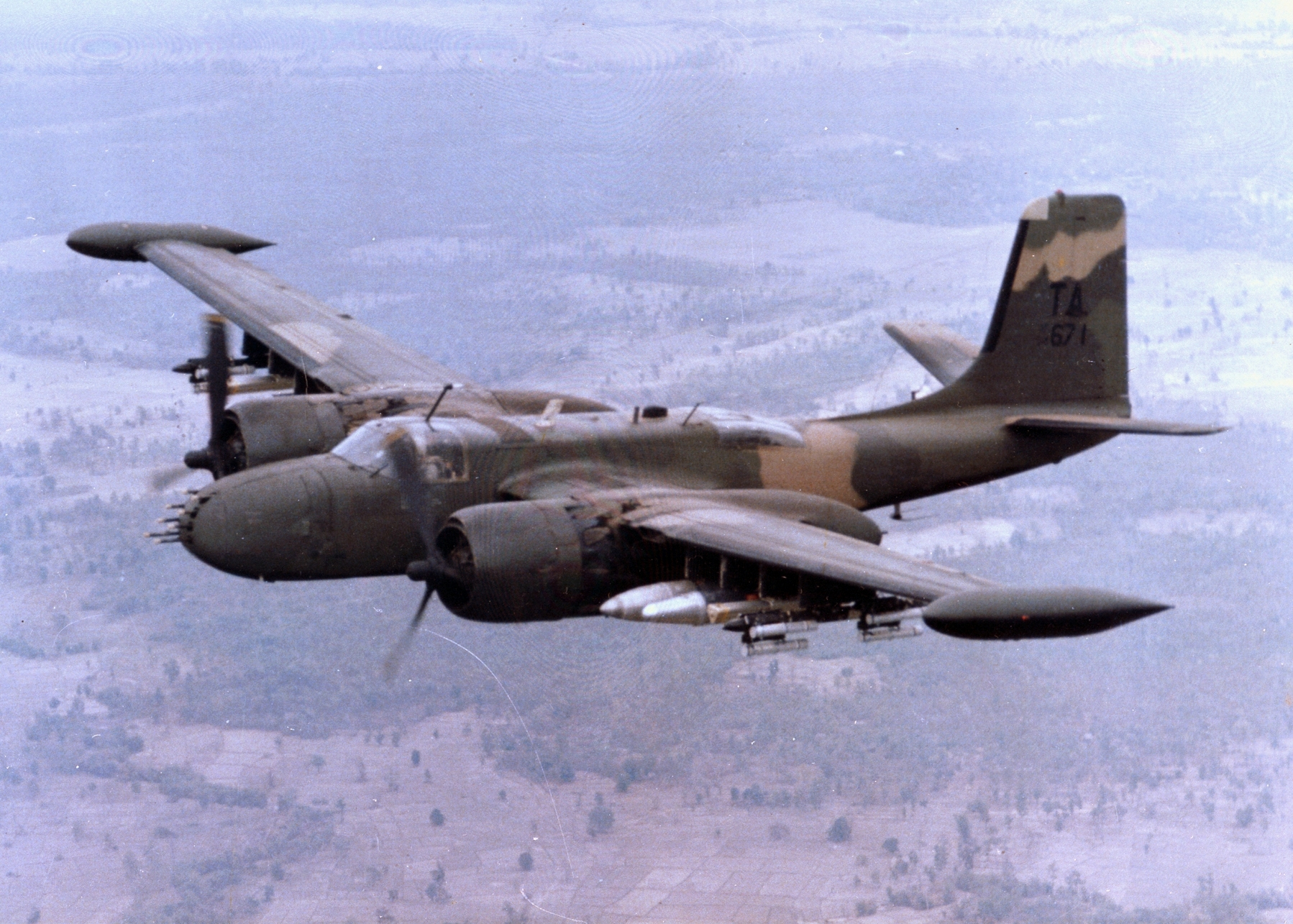
Douglas B-26 of the 609th Special Operations Squadron

From 1924 to 1947 the Air Service, United States Army Air Corps, United States Army Air Forces and United States Air Force used a designation system based on mission category, with each model in a category numbered sequentially. In 1947 when the Air Force became a separate service, the designation system was extensively overhauled, with several categories being discontinued and others renamed. For instance, the Lockheed P-80 Shooting Star (Pursuit) was redesignated as F-80 (Fighter), while the A-26 medium bomber/attack aircraft was redesignated as the B-26, reusing the designation, the Martin B-26 having retired in the meantime.

=== US Navy systems pre-1962 ===
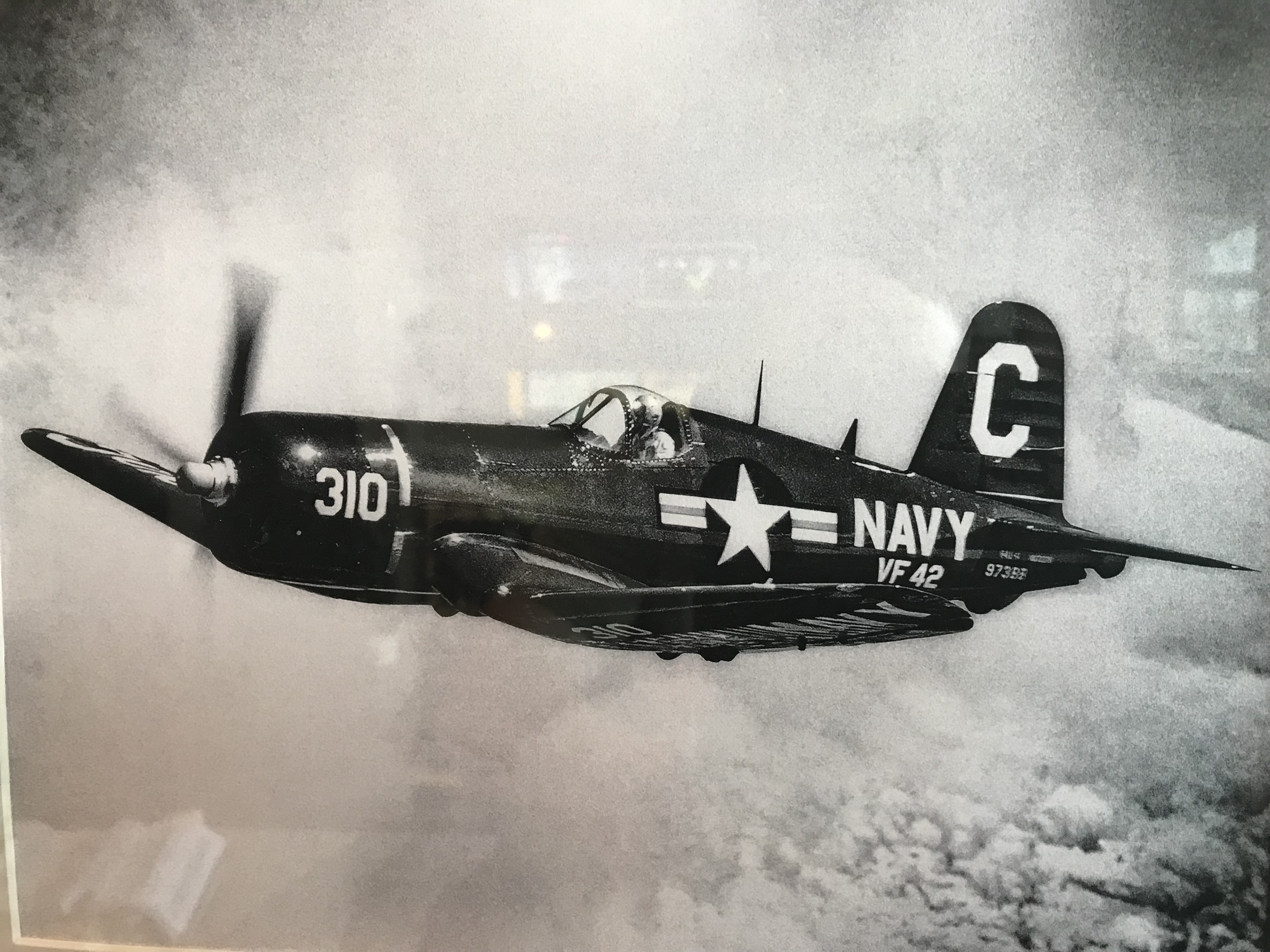
F4U Corsair of VF-42

Before 1962, the United States Navy, which also procured aircraft for the United States Marine Corps and United States Coast Guard, used several designation systems. The first was adopted in 1911, but it was replaced by the second in 1914, and aircraft still in inventory were redesignated. Both systems were based primarily on aircraft class rather than mission. In 1917, the 1914 system was dropped, and the Navy reverted to using manufacturer's model designations. In 1922, a new designation system was adopted based on both mission and manufacturer, and lasted until 1962.

==== Airships ====
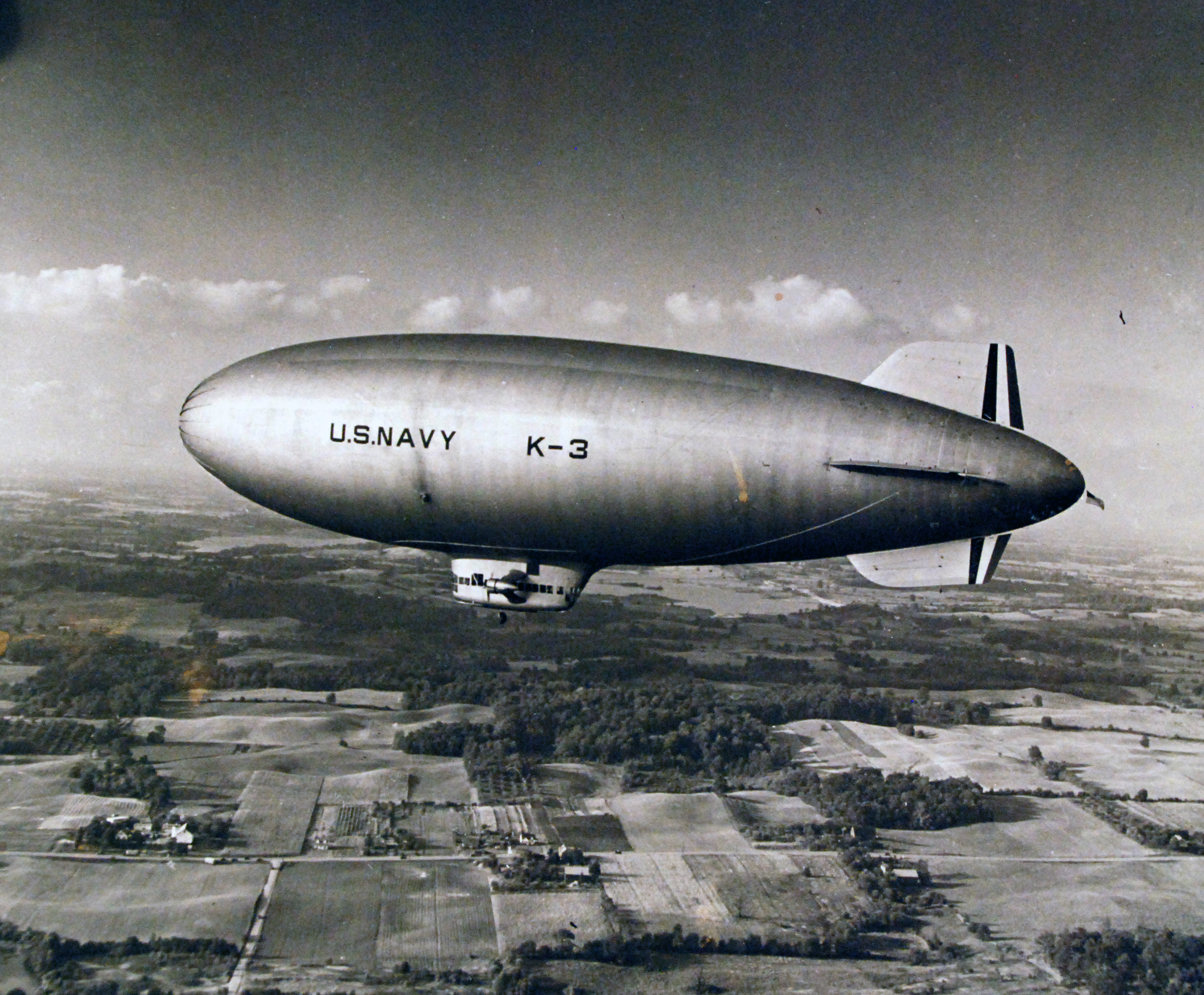
K-class blimp K-3

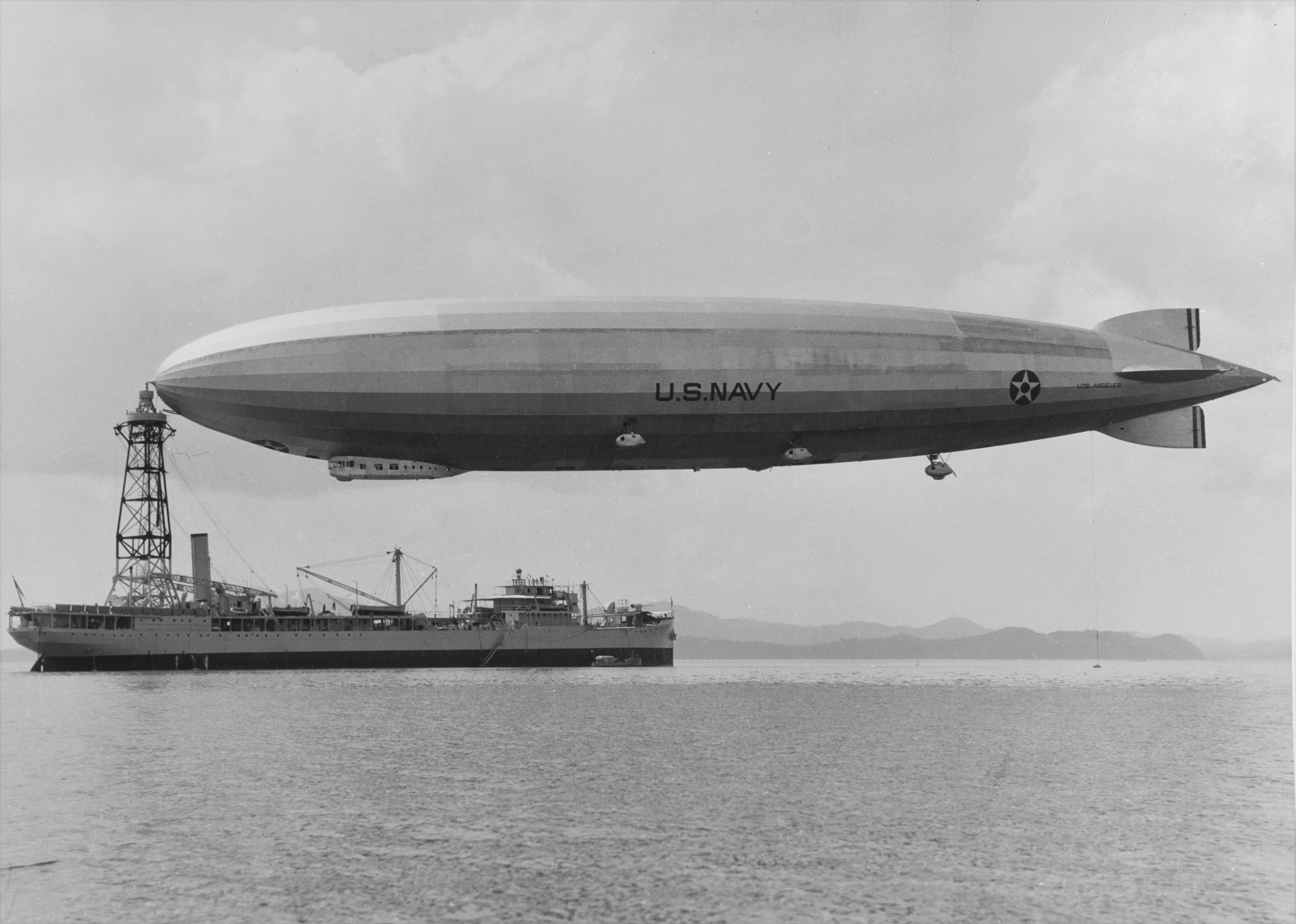
USS Los Angeles (ZR-3)

Navy blimps were initially grouped by class and then used a special designation system until 1954, when this system was unified with the main 1922 system. In contrast with its other aircraft, the Navy's four rigid airships were treated as commissioned warships, and were given hull classification symbols.

=== United States Army system 1956–1962 ===
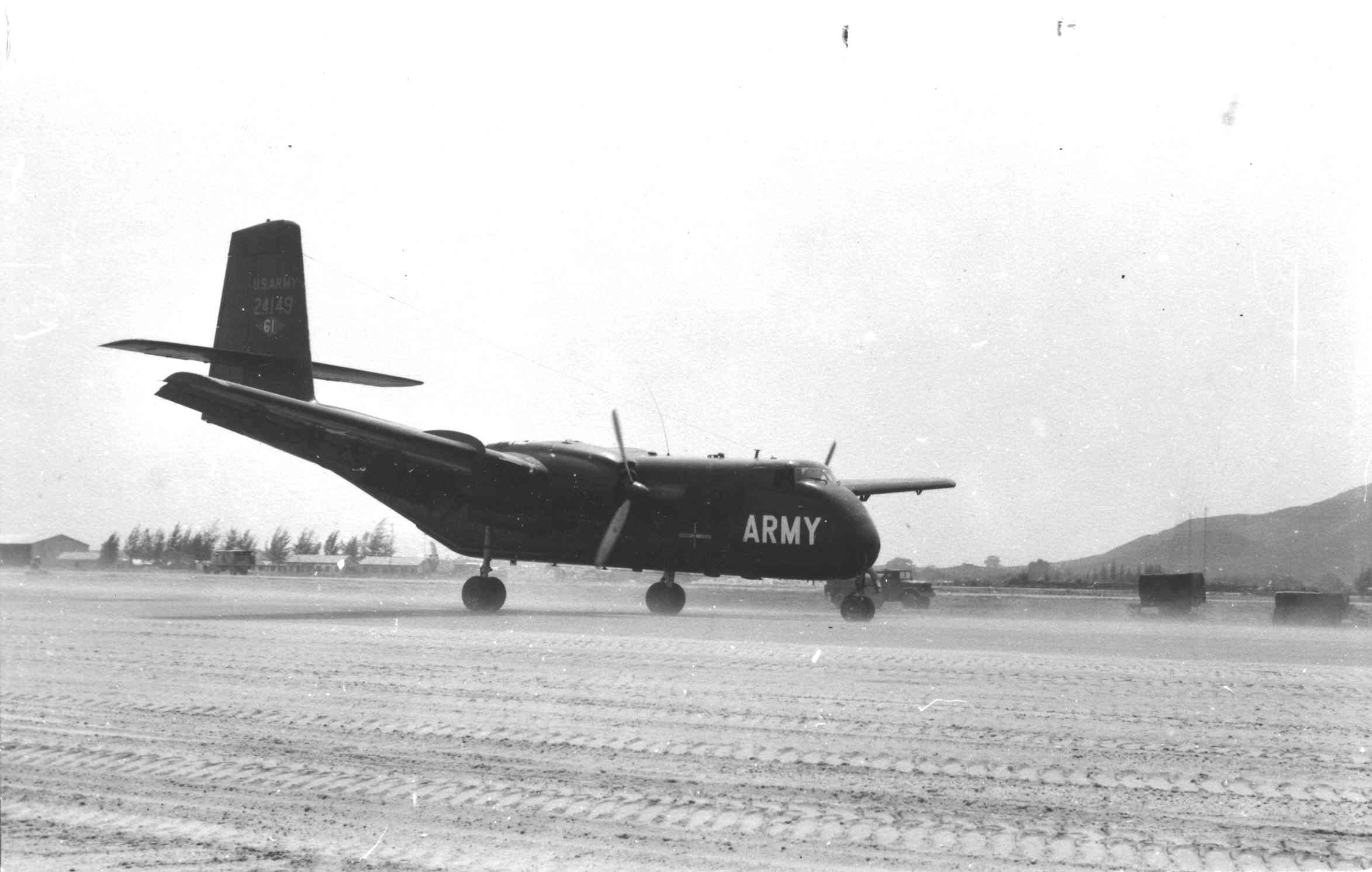
CV-2 Caribou (Note: Redesignated C-7A Caribou under the tri-service system.)

From 1956 to 1962 the United States Army used a separate designation system from that of the United States Air Force.

=== Tri-service aircraft system (Air Force/Army/Navy) 1962–present ===
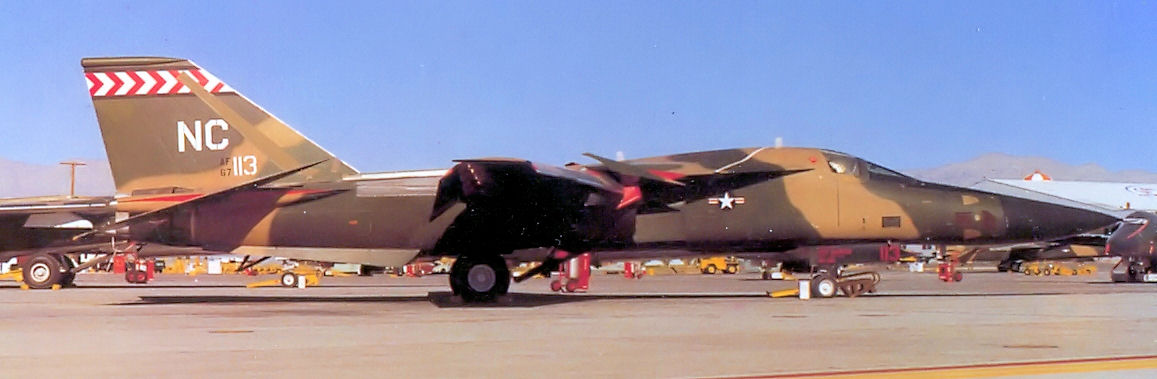
General Dynamics F-111A of the 430th Tactical Fighter Squadron

Starting 18 September 1962, a joint system of mission-based designations was used, with most of these restarting from 1. Various previously-designated models from the pre-1962 Army-Air Force system (such as the F-111) were not redesignated.

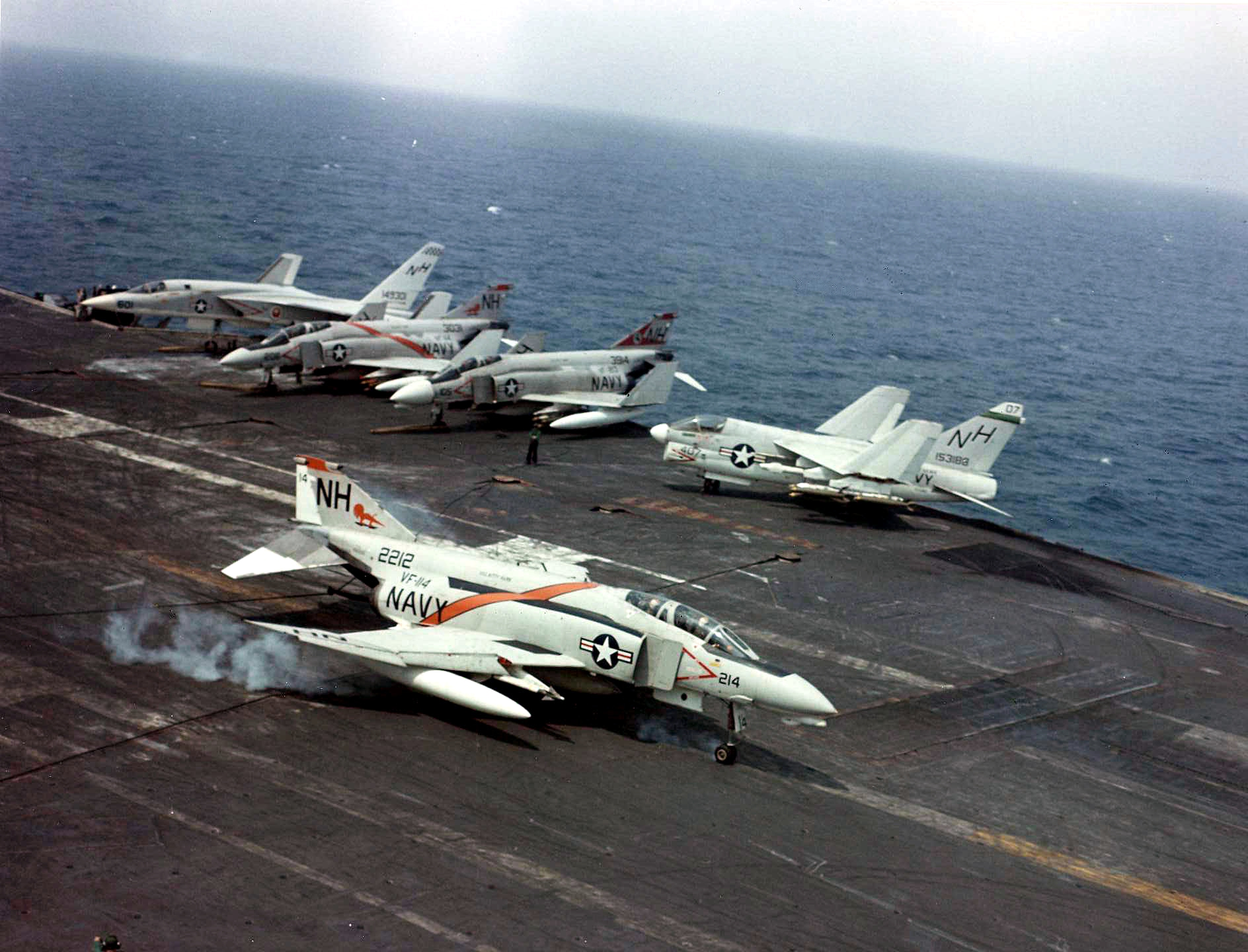
F-4B Phantom II of VF-114 (Note: Under the Navy designation system, this was an F4H-1 Phantom II.)

All in-use Navy and Marine Corps aircraft from the pre-1962 system were redesignated within the new system. An attempt was made to retain the original Type Sequence numbers for as many aircraft as possible. Thus, the F2H Banshee became the F-2, the F4H Phantom II became the F-4 and the F8U Crusader became the F-8. Army aircraft from the 1956 system were similarly redesignated.

The 1962 Tri-Service aircraft designation system is still in use today, though, since 1974, it has been presented and maintained alongside the 1963 Tri-Service rocket and guided missile designation system. DoD Directive 4120.15, first issued in 1971 and most recently updated in 2020 (4120.15E incorporating Change 02 "Designating and Naming Military Aerospace Vehicles") is implemented via Air Force Instruction 16-401/Army Regulation 70-50/Naval Air Systems Command Instruction (NAVAIRINST) 13100.16 (3 November 2020) and describes both systems. A list of US military aircraft was kept via 4120.15-L Model Designation of Military Aerospace Vehicles 31 August 2018 until its transition to data.af.mil on 31 August 2018.

== See also ==
- List of military aircraft of the United States
- List of undesignated military aircraft of the United States
- List of U.S. DoD aircraft designations
- Military aircraft
- United States military aircraft engine designations
