= 1917 in aviation =

This is a list of aviation-related events from 1917.

== Events ==
- During her 30 November 1916 – 24 February 1918 cruise, the Imperial German Navy commerce raider Wolf carries a Friedrichshafen FF.33e seaplane nicknamed Wölfchen ("Little Wolf" or "Wolf Cub"), which during 1917 singlehandedly captures at least four of the 37 enemy ships Wolf captures and sinks during her cruise. Wölfchen makes between 54 and 56 flights, the most by any World War I shipboard aircraft.
- The Aircraft Committee of the Royal Navy's Grand Fleet decides to phase balloon ships out of naval service. The balloon ships are returned to mercantile service, or converted into balloon depot ships (to inflate and maintain balloons for use by other ships) or seaplane carriers.
- The Imperial Russian Navy operates the world's second-most-powerful seaplane carrier force, behind only that of the British Royal Navy.
- The Gallaudet Aircraft Company changes its name to Gallaudet Aircraft Corporation.
- The Groupe Latécoère aircraft company is founded in Toulouse, France.
- The French Army's Service Aeronautique experiments with the use of a Breguet 14 as an air ambulance for rapid casualty evacuation on the Western Front.

=== January ===
- The Luftstreitkrafte (German Air Force) disbands three Kampfgeschwader (bomber wings) and redesignates their squadrons as Schutzstaffeln (escort squadrons). Operating two-seat Albatros L 1 DDK, Rumpler 4A 13, Gotha Taube, and Fokker M.8 aircraft, the new "Schusta" squadrons are tasked with escorting two-seat observation planes of the Feldflieger Abteilungen (field flying detachments) and Artillerieflieger Abteilungen (artillery flying detachments) during their reconnaissance flights, and are based with them.
- The Thomas Brothers Aeroplane Company merges with the Morse Chain Works to form the Thomas-Morse Aircraft Corporation in Ithaca, New York.
- January 11 - The Royal Navy seaplane carrier Ben-my-Chree is sunk by Ottoman artillery while in harbor at Castelorizo Island, becoming the only aviation ship of any nationality sunk by enemy action during World War I.
- January 12 – Manfred von Richthofen receives the Pour le Mérite (the "Blue Max") for having shot down 16 Allied aircraft since September 1916.
- January 27 - A French air raid on Freiburg, Germany takes place.

=== February ===
- The Royal Flying Corps's No. 100 Squadron, the first British night fighter squadron, is formed.
- Germany begins Operation Türkenkreuz ("Turk's Cross") bombing campaign against England, initially using airships.
- The United States Army forms the 7th Aero Squadron for service in the Panama Canal Zone.
- February 7 – Suffering progressive damage due to a series of crashes in bad visibility and poor weather, the Imperial German Navy Zeppelin L 36 finally crashes onto the Aller river and is destroyed by high winds. Her crew survives.
- February 8 – Flying a SPAD VII, the French ace Georges Guynemer becomes the first Allied pilot to shoot down a German heavy bomber when he downs a Gotha G.III.
- February 13 – Over the Gulf of Mexico off Pensacola, Florida, United States Marine Corps aviator Francis Thomas Evans, Sr., performs an aerobatic loop in a Curtiss N-9 floatplane, becoming the first person to loop a seaplane – a feat previously believed impossible in an N-9 even by the N-9's manufacturer. He will receive a Distinguished Flying Cross for the achievement in 1936. However, the recovery techniques he discovers when the N-9 stalls and spins – previously thought impossible to recover from in an N-9 – during some of the day's loop attempts prove of far greater importance and have been in use ever since.
- February 26 – In anticipation of a possible entry by the United States into World War I, U.S. Marine Corps aviator Alfred A. Cunningham receives orders to establish, equip, and command an aviation company for a Marine Corps advance base force at the Philadelphia Navy Yard in Philadelphia, Pennsylvania.
- Late February
  - The German Navy Zeppelin L 42 achieves an altitude of 19,700 feet (6,000 meters), a record for an airship.
  - The commander of the German Naval Airship Service, Peter Strasser, requests the authorization of a force of 30 naval Zeppelins, 24 for use over the North Sea and six for service over the Baltic Sea.

=== March ===
- Royal Naval Air Service Handley Page O/100 bombers begin night attacks on German naval bases, railway stations and railway junctions, and industrial targets.
- United States Navy Lieutenant Kenneth Whiting proposes to Secretary of the Navy Josephus Daniels that the Navy acquire a ship with an aircraft catapult and a flight deck. Although rejected on June 20, it is the first serious U.S. Navy consideration given to acquisition of an aviation ship since the American Civil War (1861–1865).
- March 8 – Count Ferdinand von Zeppelin, inventor of the practical dirigible, dies.
- March 13 – The United States Army's 6th Aero Squadron is organized in the Territory of Hawaii, operating three Curtiss N-9 seaplanes.
- March 16–17 (overnight) – The German Naval Airship Service attempts to bomb England for the first time in 1917, in the first use of new Zeppelins designed for high-altitude flight that the Service's commander, Peter Strasser, believes will be too high for British air defenses to reach. The five Zeppelins – at least three of which achieve altitudes of between 17,100 and 19,000 feet (5,200 and 5,800 meters) – mostly bomb open countryside and do only £79 in damage and kill no one. Disabled by mechanical failure, L 39 drifts over Compiègne, France, and is shot down by French antiaircraft guns with the loss of her entire crew, and L 35 is badly damaged while landing in Germany. The success of the Zeppelins in reaching high altitudes during a bombing raid encourages Strasser, who accompanies the raid aboard L 42, to plan a new bombing offensive.
- March 21 – The world's first drone flight takes place when an unmanned de Havilland monoplane aerial target aircraft with a 22-foot (6.7-metre) wingspan is launched off a pneumatically powered ramp at the Royal Flying Corps base at Upavon in Wiltshire, England, and flies briefly under radio control from the ground by Henry Segrave. Dozens of generals from Allied countries — probably in England for the Imperial War Conference — witness the flight. Dr. Archibald Low, the officer commanding the secret RFC Experimental Works in Feltham, Middlesex, had invented the control system.

=== April ===
- Known as Bloody April. The Royal Flying Corps, while supporting the Arras offensive, loses 245 aircraft—140 in the first two weeks—out of an initial strength of 365. Aircrew casualties are 211 killed or missing and 108 captured. The opposing Germans lose only 66 aircraft.
- Adolphe Bernard founds the Etablissements Adolphe Bernard (Adolphe Bernard Establishments) to manufacture SPAD fighter aircraft under licence. In 1922, Bernard will reorganize the company as the Société Industrielle des Métaux et du Bois (Industrial Company for Metals and Wood), and after a 1927 bankruptcy he will reorganize it again as the Société des Avions Bernard (Bernard Aircraft Company).
- April 6
  - The United States enters World War I, declaring war on the German Empire.
  - United States Marine Corps aviation has a total strength of seven officers and 43 enlisted men.
- April 13 – Royal Naval Air Service flying boats begin flying "Spider Web" patrols over the North Sea in the vicinity of the North Hinder light ship to detect German submarines in the area. The new patrol pattern, resembling a spider web, allows four aircraft to search a 4,000-square-mile (10,000-square-kilometer) area in about five hours, only half the time it takes a surfaced submarine to transit the area. The flying boats make 27 patrols in the next 18 days, sight eight German submarines, and make bombing attacks against three of them.
- April 20 – The United States Navy's first airship, DN-1 flies for the first time at Pensacola, Florida. Tests of the highly unsuccessful DN-1 come to an end only nine days later.
- April 24 – Flying a Halberstadt CL.II, Hauptmann Eduard W. Zorer, the commanding officer of Schutzstaffel 7 – a German escort squadron charged with using its two-seater aircraft to escort two-seat reconnaissance aircraft – drops down to an altitude of 60 feet (18 meters) to use machine-gun fire to support German troops counterattacking British trenches along the Gavrelle-Rœux road near Arras during the Battle of Arras. Under fire from hundreds of British rifles and machine guns, he and his pilot spray the British trenches with 500 rounds of ammunition before a hit in their engine forces them to withdraw. The incident represents the birth of close air support as a mission of the world's air forces.
- April 26 – The Pacific Aero Products Company is renamed the Boeing Airplane Company.

=== May ===
- May 1 – The Imperial German Navy Zeppelins L 43 and L 45 conduct reconnaissance patrols over the North Sea off the coast of Scotland, patrolling off the Firth of Forth and Aberdeen, respectively.
- May 4 – The Imperial German Navy Zeppelin L 43 attacks a force of British light cruisers and destroyers in the North Sea near the Dogger Bank with three 50-kg (110-lb) bombs, hitting the light cruiser HMS Dublin with bomb splinters. It is one of the few cases of an airship attacking warships.
- May 7
  - British ace Major Edward Mannock claims his first kill.
  - British ace Captain Albert Ball (44 victories) is killed in a crash following a dogfight with Lothar von Richthofen, who also crashes but survives.
- May 11 – German ace Edmund Nathanael (15 victories) flying an Albatros D.V of Prussian Jagdstaffel 5 is shot down in flames and killed at Bourlon Wood in Belgium as the ninth of 21 victories of Captain William Kennedy-Cochran-Patrick, a Scottish ace of the Royal Flying Corps's No. 23 Squadron.
- May 14 – Flying the Curtiss H.12 Large America flying boat 8666, Royal Naval Air Service Flight Commander Robert Leckie shoots down the German Zeppelin L 22 over the North Sea 18 nautical miles (33 kilometres; 21 miles) north-northwest of Texel Island. It is the first time that a flying boat shoots down a Zeppelin.
- May 19 – The United States adopts an official national insignia for United States Army, United States Navy, and United States Marine Corps aircraft for the first time, a white star centered in a blue circle with a red disc centered within the star; the United States Coast Guard does not adopt it. Except for an 18-month interruption in 1918-1919, the marking will remain in use until June 1942.
- May 23–24 (overnight) – Six Imperial German Navy Zeppelins attempt a high-altitude raid on London and the south of England and encounter bad weather. They drop most of their bombs onto open countryside, killing one man, injuring no one else, and inflicting £599 in damage, and all return safely to Germany, although the raid reveals many mechanical problems and physical difficulties for crewmen during sustained high-altitude flights. Informed of the results of the raid, Kaiser Wilhelm II of Germany says, "In spite of this success, I am of the opinion that the day of the airship is past for attacks on London. They should be used as scouts for the High Seas Fleet and strategic reconnaissance, not for bombing raids on London." The Chief of the Naval Staff argues that the bombing campaign is tying down many British personnel, guns, and aircraft on home air defense duties, and Wilhelm II agrees to allow raids to continue if conditions are favorable.
- May 24 – Turbulence throws the observer aboard a German Aviatik C.V, First Lieutenant Otto Berla, from his cockpit without a parachute. As he falls, an updraft forces the tail of the aircraft upward, and he punches through the plywood of the Aviatak's fuselage aft of his cockpit. The Aviatik's pilot returns him safely to base.
- May 25
  - The Imperial German Army's Luftstreitkräfte begins Operation Türkenkreuz ("Turk's Cross"), a heavier-than-air bombing campaign targeting London. The first operation is a mass daylight air raid by 21 Gotha G.IV bombers flying from near Ghent which divert from London due to clouds over the city and attack secondary targets in Folkestone and the Shorncliffe Army Camp, killing 95 people and injuring 195. Seventy-four British aircraft take off to intercept, but the Germans lose only one Gotha, shot down by nine Royal Naval Air Service Sopwith Pups that engage the bombers as they fly over the coast of Belgium on their way back to base. It is the first of 22 German heavier-than-air raids on the United Kingdom during World War I.
  - French ace Lieutenant René Dorme is killed in action. His 23 victories will tie him with Lieutenant Gabriel Guérin for ninth-highest-scoring French ace of World War I.

=== June ===
- Birdseye B. Lewis and Chance M. Vought found the Lewis & Vought Corporation, which later will become the Chance Vought Corporation.
- U.S. Army Colonel Raynal Bolling leads the Bolling Mission to Europe to examine the practicality of constructing British and French fighters in the United States. It leads to the establishment of the Engineering Division of the U.S. Department of War's Bureau of Aircraft Production to test its recommendations and to the manufacturing of the Airco DH.9 bomber and Bristol F.2B fighter in the United States.
- An attack prior to the Battle of Messines Ridge on a British supply train by German aircraft disrupts the supply of British ammunition, forcing British artillery to cease firing after three hours.
- At Naval Air Station Pensacola in Pensacola, Florida, the United States Navy armored cruiser Huntington lofts a kite balloon, the first U.S. Navy ship to do so.
- June 5
  - Royal Flying Corps Lieutenants Harold Satchell and Thomas Lewis of No. 20 Squadron shoot down and kill German ace Leutnant Karl Emil Schäfer. His 30 victories will place him in a tie with five other pilots as the 28th-highest-scoring German ace of World War I.
  - The Imperial German Army's Luftstreitkräfte conducts the second raid of Operation Türkenkreuz ("Turk's Cross"), a heavier-than-air bombing campaign targeting London. Unable to bomb London due to weather, the 22 Gotha G.IV bombers divert to a secondary target, a Royal Navy facility at Sheerness, killing 13 people in exchange for the loss of one bomber. The raid takes place in daylight.
  - The United States Navy's First Aeronautical Detachment disembarks from the collier USS Jupiter in France under the command of Kenneth Whiting. It is the first U.S. military unit to arrive in Europe.
- June 6 – The world's first landplane designed for use as a torpedo bomber, a Sopwith Cuckoo, is completed for the Royal Naval Air Service.
- June 13 – The third raid of Germany's Operation Türkenkreuz is the first to reach London. In daylight, 14 German Gotha G.IV bombers bomb London, and seven others attack small towns in Kent and Essex. It is the deadliest and most destructive air raid on the United Kingdom of World War I. Attacking in daylight, they drop 118 bombs, killing 162 people – including more than 18 children killed by a single bomb that hits a primary school in Poplar – and injuring 432. The casualty total is greater than that inflicted by all the German airship attacks on the United Kingdom combined up to that time. Although 92 British aircraft take off to intercept the raid, all of the German bombers return safely to base.
- June 14
  - Royal Naval Air Service Curtiss H.12 Large America flying boat 8677 shoots down the German Zeppelin L.43 in flames over the North Sea, with the loss of the Zeppelin's entire crew.
  - The American aviator, aircraft manufacturer, and airline entrepreneur Thomas W. Benoist dies in a streetcar accident in Sandusky, Ohio. His company, Benoist Aircraft, soon ceases production and goes out of business.
- Mid-June – The United States Marine Corps bases aircraft at Marine Barracks, Quantico, Virginia, for the first time, beginning a presence which eventually will lead to the establishment of Marine Corps Air Station Quantico there.
- June 16–17 (overnight) – Five German Navy Zeppelins attempt a high-altitude raid on London and southern England. Only two arrive over England. L 42 bombs Ramsgate and detonates a munitions dump, wrecking the naval base, inflicting £29,000 pounds in damage, killing three civilians, and injuring 14 civilians and two Royal Navy personnel, then returns safely to Germany. L 48 bombs open fields outside Harwich before Royal Flying Corps Lieutenant L. P. Watkins of No. 37 Squadron shoots her down in flames killing 14 of the 17 men on board and fatally injuring one of the survivors. Among the dead is Viktor Schütze, the deputy commander of the German Naval Airship Service.
- June 20 – The British war cabinet decides to increase the size of the Royal Flying Corps from 108 to 200 squadrons, with most of increase coming in bomber squadrons.
- June 24 – The Imperial German Army's air service, the Luftstreitkräfte, brings together four Jagdstaffeln (fighter squadrons) – Jagstaffeln ("Jastas") 4, 6, 10, and 11 – to form Germany's first Jagdgeschwader (fighter wing), Jagdgeschwader I. Manfred von Richthofen is promoted from commanding officer of Jasta 11 to commanding officer of Jagdgeshwader I. Jagdgeschwader I will become known as the "Flying Circus," thanks to the colorful paint schemes on its aircraft and possibly because it often moved from place to place for its operations in a manner similar to a traveling circus.
- June 27 – German ace Leutnant Karl Allmenröder is shot down and killed. His 30 victories will tie him with five other pilots as the 28th-highest-scoring German ace of World War I.
- June 28 – An aircraft takes off successfully from a flying-off platform mounted on a warship's gun turret for the first time when Royal Naval Air Service Flight Commander F. J. Rutland takes off from a platform aboard the British light cruiser HMS Yarmouth in a Sopwith Pup.

=== July ===
- The only Handley Page O/100 in the Mediterranean theater bombs Constantinople in an attempt to begin a bombing campaign against the Ottoman Empire's capital city.
- July 7 – In daylight, 22 German Gotha G.IV bombers make the fourth attack on the United Kingdom of Operation Türkenkreuz, killing 57 to 65 people and injuring 193 to 245 (sources differ on casualty totals). British aircraft fly 100 sorties to intercept the German bombers, shooting one down and damaging three others; the bombers shoot down two of the intercepting British aircraft.
- July 12 – Royal Naval Air Service Flight Lieutenant O. A. Butcher, manning a kite balloon lofted by the destroyer HMS Patriot off the Shetland Islands, sights the German submarine U-69 at a range of 28 nautical miles (52 kilometres), allowing Patriot to intercept U-69 and sink her with depth charges.
- July 17 – United States Secretary of the Navy Josephus Daniels approves construction of the United States Navy′s Naval Aircraft Factory, to be built at League Island Navy Yard in Philadelphia, Pennsylvania.
- July 22 – In daylight, German Gotha G.IV bombers make the fifth attack on the United Kingdom of Operation Türkenkreuz, bombing Felixstowe and Harwich.
- July 27
  - Flying a SPAD XII, Georges Guynemer shoots down a German DFW aircraft, becoming the first French ace with 50 victories.
  - The Naval Aircraft Factory, the in-house aircraft production and research arm of the U.S. Navy, is established.

=== August ===
- The Imperial German Army's air service, the Luftstreitkrafte, perfects close air support tactics during the Battle of Passchendaele, with close-air-support aircraft escorted by fighters attacking British troops with machine guns and hand grenades. The Germans discover that groups of four to six aircraft work best and that the ideal altitude from which to attack trenches is 150 feet (46 meters), while 1,200 to 1,500 feet (370 to 460 meters) is best for attacking larger targets like artillery batteries and reserve infantry concentrations. They find that line-astern formations are best to reduce the effects of enemy ground fire and line-abreast formations are best for fending off enemy fighters.
- United States Secretary of War Newton D. Baker announces the completion of the first Liberty engine 28 days after its design began. Before the end of World War I, 13,574 will be manufactured, and the total will reach 20,478 by 1919.
- August 1 – The German Navy Zeppelin L 53 achieves an altitude of 20,700 feet (6,300 meters), a new record for an airship.
- August 2
  - Italian ace Pier Ruggero Piccio scores his eighth victory by shooting down Austro-Hungarian ace Frank Linke-Crawford, who is flying a two-seat aircraft without a rear gunner on board. Linke-Crawford survives uninjured.
  - A Sopwith Pup flown by Royal Naval Air Service Squadron Commander Edwin Dunning becomes the first aircraft to land aboard a moving ship, the hybrid aircraft carrier-battlecruiser HMS Furious.
- August 6 – Ground is broken on the United States Navy′s Naval Aircraft Factory at League Island Navy Yard in Philadelphia, Pennsylvania.
- August 7 – Dunning is killed on his third landing when the Pup falls over the side of Furious.
- August 12 – In daylight, German Gotha G.IV bombers make the sixth attack on the United Kingdom of Operation Türkenkreuz, bombing Shoeburyness and Southend. In the fifth raid on July 22 and this raid, the Germans lose a combined five bombers, one of them shot down and the other four wrecked in crashes on landing as they return to their bases.
- August 17 – Tasked to study how the United Kingdom's air forces could be best organized for the war with Germany and to consider whether they should remain subordinate to the British Army and Royal Navy, General Jan Smuts completes the Smuts Report. In it, he observes that an air service could be used as "an independent means of war operations," that "there is absolutely no limit to the scale of its future independent war service," that soon "aerial operations with their devastation of enemy lands and destruction of industrial and populous centres on a vast scale may be the principal operations of war, to which older forms of military and naval operations may become secondary and subordinate." He projects that by the summer of 1918 "the air battle front will be far behind the Rhine" while the ground front is still bogged down in Belgium and France and that air attacks on German industry and lines of communication could be an "important factor in bringing about peace." The report is the foundation of a new theory of warfare advocated by British bomber advocates and will inspire the creation of the independent Royal Air Force in 1918.
- August 18 – The Luftstreitkrafte attempts the largest heavier-than-air raid against the United Kingdom of World War I, sending 28 Gotha bombers from their bases in Belgium to attack England despite predictions of unfavorable winds. After two hours in the air, they have only reached Zeebrugge on the Belgian coast, and it takes them another hour to reach the coast of England, where they find themselves 64 kilometers (40 miles) off course. With too little fuel to go on, the strike commander orders the bombers to abort the raid and return to base; two of them come down in the North Sea, two others crash-land in the neutral Netherlands, and others are lost in crash-landings in Belgium.
- August 21 – Flying a Sopwith Pup fighter launched from a flying-off platform mounted on a gun turret of the Royal Navy light cruiser HMS Yarmouth, Royal Naval Air Service Flight Sub-Lieutenant B. A. Smart shoots down the German Navy Zeppelin L 23 in flames over the North Sea with the loss of her entire crew. Smart is recovered safely along with his plane's engine and one of its machine guns after he ditches his fighter in the sea.
- August 21–22 (overnight) – Eight German Navy Zeppelins commanded by German Naval Airship Service commander Peter Strasser aboard L 46 attempt a high-altitude raid on England. Only L 41 crosses the British coastline; she bombs the Kingston upon Hull area, destroying a chapel and injuring one civilian.
- August 22 – The Luftstreitkrafte sends 15 Gotha bombers to attack England in a daylight raid. Five turn back over the North Sea, and the remaining 10 encounter British fighter aircraft and heavy antiaircraft fire over the Isle of Thanet. Two Gothas are shot down immediately, and another is shot down over Dover. The losses prompt to Germans to halt daylight raids over the United Kingdom and switch to night bombing.

=== September ===
- In a second bombing raid against Constantinople, the sole Handley Page O/100 in the Mediterranean is forced down in the Gulf of Xeros by engine failure and its crew taken prisoner by Ottoman forces.
- The Commander in Chief of the Grand Fleet, Admiral David Beatty, proposes an aerial torpedo attack by 120 Sopwith Cuckoo torpedo bombers launched from eight converted merchant ships against the German High Seas Fleet at its moorings in Germany. Training for the raid takes place in the Firth of Forth, but the war will end before it can be carried out.
- September 3 – The United States Army's 1st Aero Squadron arrives in France.
- September 3–4 (overnight) – After the losses suffered in the face of improving British air defences in the August 22 daylight raid against England, the Imperial German Army's air service, the Luftstreitkrafte, decides to experiment with night raids, sending five Gotha bombers to attack Chatham Dockyard in Kent. The raid kills 152, including 130 Royal Navy recruits who die in a direct hit on their barracks in the highest death toll inflicted by a single aerial bomb during World War I. The German bombers find that British night defenses are weak.
- September 4–5 (overnight) – The Germans attempt a second heavier-than-air night raid against the United Kingdom, sending 11 Gotha bombers to raid London. Nine of the planes reach England, but only five reach London. British aircraft fly 18 defensive sorties, but fail to make contact with the German aircraft; the British flights, however, demonstrate the feasibility of using the Sopwith Camel as a night fighter. One Gotha fails to return, probably shot down by antiaircraft guns at Fort Borstal in Rochester.
- September 10 – After leaving the Wright-Martin Aircraft Corporation, Glenn L. Martin founds the second Glenn L. Martin Company.
- September 11 – French ace Capitaine Georges Guynemer goes missing in action while flying a SPAD XIII during combat with German aircraft near Poelkapelle, Belgium. Kurt Wisserman of Jasta 3 is credited with shooting him down, but Guynemer's body is never found. Guynemer has 54 kills at the time of his death.
- September 15 – Flying a Fokker Dr.I, German ace Oberleutnant Kurt Wolff is shot down and killed in a dogfight with Royal Flying Corps Sopwith Camels north of Wervicq, Belgium. His 33 kills will tie him with Leutnant Otto Koennecke and Leutnant Heinrich Bongartz as the 20th-highest-scoring German ace of World War I.
- September 17 – While on convoy escort duty in the Atlantic Ocean, the United States Navy armored cruiser Huntington has her kite balloon blown away in bad weather. For rescuing the balloonist, a shipfitter from her crew is awarded the third Medal of Honor of World War I.
- September 22 – A Royal Naval Air Service Curtiss H-12 flying boat piloted by Flight Sub-Lieutenant N. Magor sinks the German submarine UB-32 in the North Sea. It is the only confirmed instance of a British aircraft sinking a German submarine without the assistance of surface ships during World War I.
- September 23 – During an epic 10-minute dogfight against six Royal Flying Corps SE.5s of No. 56 Squadron, the German ace Werner Voss, flying a Fokker Dr.I triplane, is shot down and killed by the British ace Arthur Rhys-Davids north of Frezenberg, Belgium. At the time of his death, Voss has 48 victories and is the second-leading German ace behind Manfred von Richthofen at the time; Voss will be the fourth-highest-scoring German ace of World War I.
- September 24–25 (overnight)
  - Nine German Navy Zeppelins set out to attack the middle and north of England. Only L 35 makes a deep penetration of England, dropping her bombs near Rotherham. Total damage inflicted by the raid is £2,210.
  - Sixteen German Gotha bombers set out to raid the United Kingdom. Thirteen reach England; five of them reach London, while the other eight bomb Dover and other targets in Kent.
- September 25–26 (overnight) – Fifteen German Gotha bombers set out to bomb London, but only three reach the city. One of the bombers comes down in the North Sea, probably the victim of a British Sopwith 1½ Strutter flown by Douglas Bell and George Williams of the Royal Flying Corps's No. 78 Squadron.
- September 28 – In accordance with an agreement between Italy and the United States for the United States to receive bomber aircraft from Italy and United States Army Air Service cadets to receive flight training from the Royal Italian Army's Military Aviation Corps in exchange for raw materials from the United States, the first 46 American cadets arrive at Foggia, Italy, for training. Another 250 soon join them, and almost 500 American aviators will receive training in Italy – primarily at Foggia – before the war ends in November 1918.
- September 28–29 (overnight) – Twenty-seven German bombers – 25 Gothas and two Zeppelin-Staaken R.VI bombers – attempt a raid on England, but most turn back due to bad weather. Those that do reach England drop bombs that injure three people and inflict £129 in damage. Three Gothas are lost, and six others are damaged while landing. It is the first time that the new giant Riesenflugzeuge, operated by the German Riesenflugzeug Abteilungen ("Giant Airplane Detachments") Rfa 500 and Rfa 501, take part in bombing operations against the United Kingdom; they are the largest bombers ever used in bombing Britain, including those used by Germany and Italy during World War II.
- September 29–30 (overnight) – Seven Gothas and two Zeppelin-Staaken R.VIs set out to raid England. Their bombs kill 40 people and injure 87. One Gotha is lost. By this time, the population of London is so alarmed by the German night raids that up to 300,000 people seek shelter in London Underground stations at night, while others leave the city to seek overnight accommodation elsewhere or to sleep in open fields in the countryside.
- September 30-October 1 (overnight) – Eleven Gotha bombers raid England.

=== October ===
- At Ochey, France, the British Royal Flying Corps forms its first wing dedicated to long-range bombardment of targets in Germany. It will later become VIII Brigade.
- The United States Marine Corps divides its Marine Aeronautical Company into two units, the First Aviation Squadron equipped with land planes and the First Aeronautical Squadron equipped with seaplanes. The latter unit is intended for antisubmarine patrols from the Azores.
- The United States Navy establishes a training program for kite balloon crews at the Goodyear Tire and Rubber Company in Akron, Ohio. Despite this, the U.S. Navy faces a shortage of kite balloon crews throughout World War I.
- October 1
  - The Royal Navy tests an aircraft catapult for the first time, using a compressed-air catapult aboard the catapult trials ship Slinger to launch an unmanned Short 184 with its fuselage fabric removed and engine replaced by ballast.
  - The Royal Navy conducts the first launch of an aircraft from a battleship or battlecruiser, when Royal Naval Air Service Flight Commander Frederick Rutland takes off in a Sopwith Pup fighter from a platform mounted on a 15-inch (381-mm) gun turret of the battlecruiser HMS Repulse.
- October 1–2 (overnight) – Eighteen Gotha bombers of the Imperial German Army's air service, the Luftstreitkräfte, set out to raid the United Kingdom. Eleven of them reach England. British antiaircraft guns fire 14,000 rounds at them without scoring a single hit. The intensity of German air raids over the past week have created a shortage of antiaircraft shells and worn out the barrels of many antiaircraft guns, and falling fragments from antiaircraft shells have killed eight people and injured 67 in England.
- October 7 – L 57, a German Navy Zeppelin modified to be able to make a long-distance flight from Yambol, Bulgaria, to Mahenge, German East Africa, to deliver medical supplies and munitions to German ground forces there, and as such the largest airship ever built at the time at 743 feet (226 meters) and carrying 2,418,700 cubic feet (68,490 cubic meters) of hydrogen gas, is wrecked and destroyed by fire while attempting to take off for a test flight in poor weather.
- October 13 – Italian ace Luigi Olivari is killed when his SPAD VII crashes on takeoff. He had claimed 19 enemy aircraft shot down, of which 12 were considered confirmed at the time of his death, but posthumously is credited with eight kills.
- October 19 – The U.S. Army opens Love Field in Dallas, Texas as a flight training base. The airfield is later converted to civil use, becoming the primary commercial airport for the Dallas–Fort Worth metroplex until 1974, and continues to serve as an important regional airport.
- October 19–20 (overnight) – The German Navy dispatches 13 Zeppelins on a high-altitude raid against the middle of England, and they encounter an unexpected gale. Two never leave their sheds; the other 11 set out for England and become lost in the storm. Most bomb open countryside, although L 41 damages the Austin Motor Works at Longbridge and L 45 bombs Northampton and London, killing 24 and injuring nine people. The British use muzzled antiaircraft guns around London to avoid guiding Zeppelins to the city, and the attack becomes known as the "Silent Raid." Although 73 British planes take off to intercept the raid, none have the ability to reach the Zeppelins' operating altitude. The storm scatters the Zeppelins widely across Germany, the Netherlands, Belgium, and France during their return flights and only six reach Germany safely. L 55 sets an altitude record for airships of 24,000 feet (7,300 meters) during her homebound flight before being damaged beyond repair in a hard landing in Germany; L 44 is shot down in flames by French artillery over the Western Front with the loss of all hands; L 49 lands in France and is captured along with her entire crew; L 45 lands in France and is destroyed by her crew, who are captured; and L 50 makes a hard landing in France, after which 15 of her crew manage to get off the airship and are captured and she drifts away and crosses France before disappearing over the Mediterranean Sea with four men still aboard.
- October 29–30 (overnight) – Three German Luftstreitkräfte bombers set out for the first heavier-than-air raid on England in four weeks. Two divert to Calais, France, due to bad weather; the third reaches England and bombs the Essex coast.
- October 30 – The German ace Leutnant Heinrich Gontermann is performing aerobatics when the upper wing of his Fokker Dr.I fighter breaks off. He is fatally injured in the subsequent crash. His 39 victories will tie him with Leutnant Carl Menckhoff as the 13th-highest-scoring German ace of World War I.
- October 30–31 (overnight) – Twenty-two German Gotha bombers set out to raid London, with the newly developed 4.5-kg (9.9-lb) incendiary bombs included in their bombloads. Fewer than half the bombers reach the London area; they bomb the city's eastern suburbs, but many of the incendiary bombs fail to ignite. The rest of the planes bomb Kent, where they destroy a gasometer in Ramsgate but achieve little else. Five of the bombers crash while attempting to land upon returning to their bases. Bad weather will prevent another raid against England until December.

=== November ===
- November 19 – The Battle of Caporetto ends. The 27-day battle has caught the Italian Corpo Aeronautico Militare ("Military Aviation Corps") by surprise and it has lost a great deal of equipment, but it claims to have shot down 39 enemy aircraft in 70 air-to-air engagements during the battle.
- November 21–24 – In an attempt to deliver medical supplies and munitions to German ground forces in German East Africa, the German Navy Zeppelin L 59, specially modified for long-range flights, makes a 6,757-kilometer (4,196-statute mile) journey from Yambol, Bulgaria, over European Turkey, Asia Minor, and the Mediterranean Sea and into Africa to a point west of Khartoum before being recalled to Yambol, which she reaches after 95 hours 5 minutes continuously in the air at an average speed of 71 km/h (44 mph). The flight sets a new aircraft endurance record. She returns to Yambol with enough fuel aboard to have remained in the air for another 64 hours.
- November 28 – The United States Navy′s Naval Aircraft Factory is completed at League Island Navy Yard in Philadelphia, Pennsylvania, 110 days after groundbreaking.

=== December ===
- The Imperial German Army's air service, the Luftstreitkräfte, begins to operate a radio-equipped Rumpler C.IV off the coast of England to report weather conditions and reduce the chance of adverse weather interfering with Luftstreitkräfte bomber raids against the United Kingdom.
- Imperial German Navy Zeppelins make daily reconnaissance patrols over the Heligoland Bight throughout the month.
- December 5–6 (overnight) – After weeks of unfavorable weather, the Luftstreitkräfte makes its first heavier-than-air raid against the United Kingdom since October 1917. Nineteen Gotha and two Riesenflugzeug bombers attack in several waves, causing £100,000 in damage, mostly in London, but inflicting few casualties. British antiaircraft guns shoot down two Gothas and their crews are captured; a third bomber and its crew go missing. It is the last German bombing raid against the United Kingdom until January 1918.
- December 6 – Chikuhei Nakajima and Seibi Kawanishi found the Japan Aeroplane Manufacturing Work Company Ltd. It is the first aircraft manufacturing company in Japan.
- December 7 – The Battle of Cambrai comes to end, with 10 German ground-attack squadrons having provided close air support to German ground forces during the 17-day battle. German ground-attack aircraft have played a key role in halting the British advance, convincing the Luftstreitkrafte of the need for a permanent ground-attack force.
- December 9 – Romania signs an armistice with the Central Powers, withdrawing from participation in World War I.

== First flights ==
- Berkmans Speed Scout
- Nieuport 24
- Orenco A
- Phönix D.I
- Saunders T.1
- Standard M-Defense, prototype of the Standard E-1
- Voisin X
- Late 1917 – Siemens-Schuckert D.III

=== January ===
- Sopwith Camel flown by Harry Hawker
- January 5 – Sage Type 3
- January 15 – Siemens-Schuckert R.VII
- January 24 – Aviatik D.I, also known as Berg D.I and Berg Fighter
- January 28 – Junkers J.I

=== February ===
- Felixstowe F.3
- Junkers J.4
- February 16 – Fairey Campania, first aircraft designed for seaplane carrier operations

=== March ===
- March 19 – Ansaldo SVA
- March 20 – Sturtevant B

=== April ===
- Avro 529
- April 4 – SPAD S.XIII
- April 11 – Marinens Flyvebaatfabrikk M.F.3
- April 20 – U.S. Navy blimp DN-1

=== May ===
- May 23 – Sopwith Dolphin
- May 24 – B-1, the first U.S. Navy B-class blimp

=== June ===
- Siemens-Schuckert D.II
- Sopwith Cuckoo
- Thomas-Morse S-4
- June 14 – Nieuport 28
- June 22 – Port Victoria P.V.7

=== July ===
- Airco DH.9
- Avro 530
- Siemens-Schuckert Dr.I
- July 5 – Fairey N.9

=== August ===
- Westland N.1B

=== September ===
- Bellanca CD
- Bellanca CE
- September 7 – Port Victoria P.V.8
- September 13 – Sopwith 3F.2 Hippo
- September 14 – Fairey III
- September 17 – Junkers J 7, prototype of the Junkers D.I

=== October ===
- October 15 – Alcock Scout

=== November ===
- Ansaldo A-1 Balilla
- Caudron C. 02
- Felixstowe F.5
- November 9 – Siemens-Schuckert DDr.I
- November 30 – Vickers Vimy,

=== December ===
- December 9 – Schaefer & Sons R.S.
- December 10 – Junkers J 8, prototype of the Junkers CL.I

== Entered service ==
- Aviatik D.I, also known as Berg D.I and Berg Fighter, with the Austro-Hungarian Imperial and Royal Aviation Troops
- Caudron G.6 with the French Army's Service Aéronautique
- FBA Type S with Aviation Maritime (French Naval Aviation)
- Siemens-Schuckert D.I with the German Luftstreitkräfte
- Spring 1917 – Nieuport 24
- Summer 1917 – Breguet 14 with the French Army's Service Aéronautique

=== January ===
- Airco DH.4 with No. 55 Squadron Royal Flying Corps

=== February ===
- Sopwith Triplane with No.1 (Naval) Squadron, Royal Naval Air Service
- February 26 – Siemens-Schuckert R.VII with the German Luftstreitkräfte

=== March ===
- Royal Aircraft Factory S.E.5 with No. 56 Squadron, Royal Flying Corps.

=== April ===
- Bristol F.2A with No. 48 Squadron, Royal Flying Corps

=== May ===
- Airco DH.5 with No. 24 and No. 32 Squadrons, Royal Flying Corps.

=== June ===
- Sopwith Camel with the Royal Flying Corps

=== August ===
- Junkers J.I with the Imperial German Army's Luftstreitkräfte

=== November ===
- Airco DH.9 with the Royal Flying Corps′s No. 108 Squadron

=== December ===
- Phönix D.I with the Austro-Hungarian Imperial and Royal Aviation Troops

== Retirements ==
=== April ===
- Avro 528 by the Royal Naval Air Service
- Gotha G.II by the Imperial German Army′s Luftstreitkräfte

=== November ===
- Siemens-Schuckert R.VI by the Imperial German Army's Luftstreitkräfte
