= B-class blimp =

B class
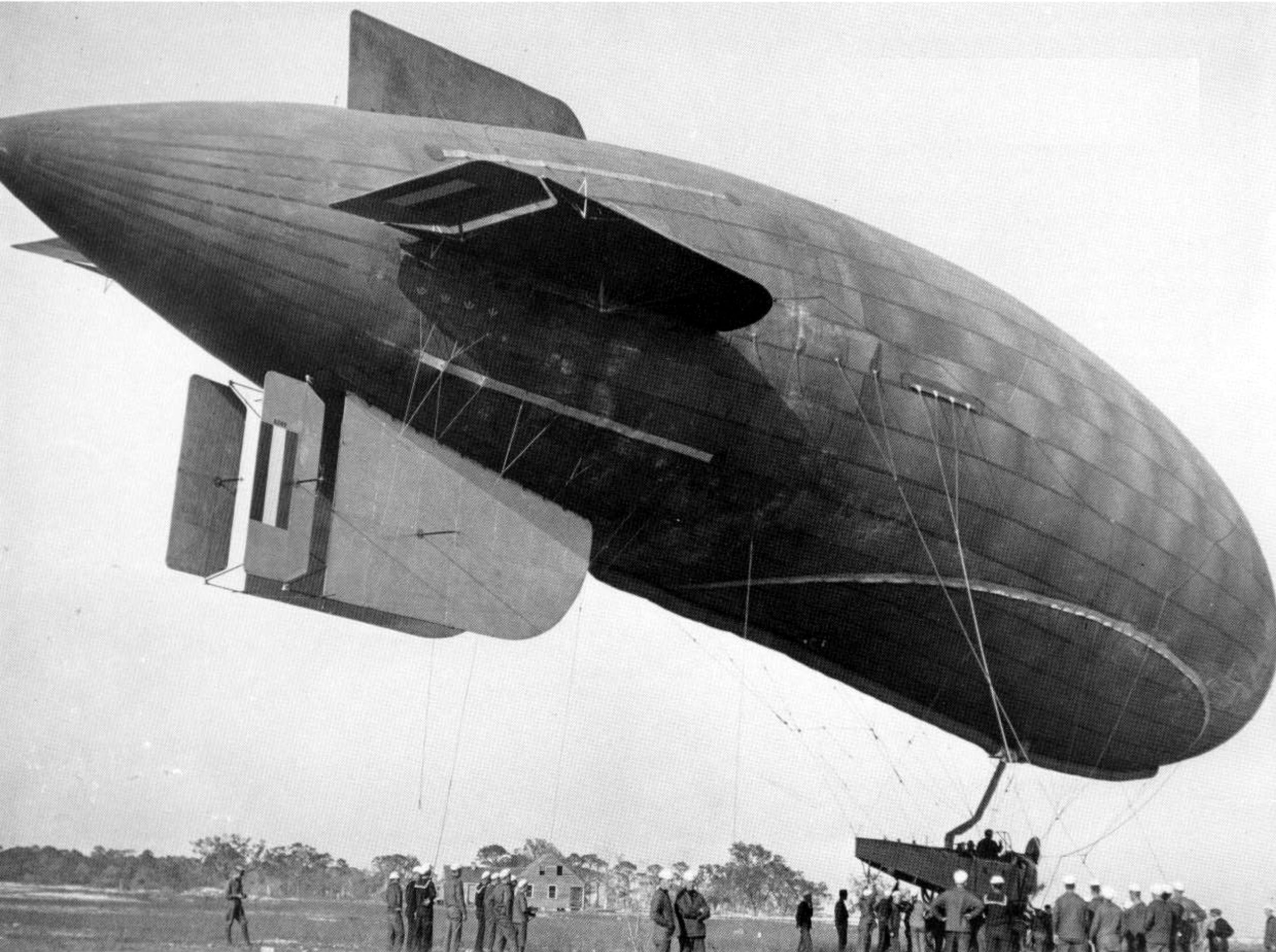
- B-1, the first of the class. B-1 is easily identified by the dual lower fins, later B-types had only a single fin.

General information
- Type: Patrol airship
- Manufacturer: Various
- Primary user: US Navy
- Number built: 20

History
- First flight: 24 May 1917, at White City Amusement Park hangar in Chicago, IL
- Retired: 14 August 1920

The B class blimps were patrol airships operated by the United States Navy during and shortly after World War I. The Navy had learned a great deal from the DN-1 fiasco. The result was the very successful B-type airships. Dr. Jerome Hunsaker was asked to develop a theory of airship design, Lt. John H. Towers had returned from Europe having inspected British designs, and using reports from attachés on British airship operations, the Navy was prepared to seek bids for blimps from American manufacturers. On 4 February 1917 the Secretary of the Navy directed that 16 nonrigid airships of Class B be procured. A February 12, 1917 meeting with the Chief of the Bureau of Construction and Repair, and representatives of Goodyear, Goodrich, Connecticut Aircraft Company, Curtiss Aeroplane and Motor Corporation, and U.S. Rubber Company, it was agreed that the order for 16 dirigibles was beyond the capability of any one company. The conference resulted in a committee to coordinate on sharing raw materials, information and experience. Ultimately Goodyear manufactured 9 envelopes, Goodrich made 5 and Curtiss assembled the gondolas for all of those 14 ships. Connecticut Aircraft contracted with U.S. Rubber for its two envelopes and with Pigeon Fraser for its gondolas. The Curtiss-built gondolas used by Goodyear and Goodrich used modified Curtiss JN-4 fuselages powered by Curtiss OXX engines. The Connecticut Aircraft blimps were powered by Hall-Scott engines. One ship, B-20 was equipped with a special control car. All B-Class airships were delivered to the Navy between August 1917 (B-1) and September 1918 (B-20).

== First flight ==
The first flight of a B class blimp was made by the engineers who built it, Ralph Upson and Lt Preston, on May 24, 1917 at the White City Amusement Park, Chicago, Illinois, site where the B-1 had been assembled. Two more flights were made May 29, 1917. Leaving at midnight May 29, 1917 on B-1s fourth flight, Upson decided that since the B-1 was performing well he would rather not land at the small White City facility. Instead they would fly directly to the incomplete hangar at Wingfootlake. The B-1 was forced to land at Medina, Ohio due to an oil failure. Even with the forced landing the B-1 set a new record for distance flown. Both Goodyear and Goodrich used the White City Hangar to erect B-type airships. When the hangar at Wingfoot Lake near Akron Ohio became available in June 1917 Goodyear moved its activities there.

== Organization for Operations ==
An entire organization had to be created to operate the B-Class airships. In 1917 There were few Naval Aviators qualified to pilot airships and few facilities for operations. There was no organization for operating the airships. Pilots had to be trained, so the Navy contracted with Goodyear to train Naval Aviators as airship pilots at Wingfootlake, Ohio. The Navy set up airship stations along the East Coast, at Chatham, Massachusetts, Montauk, Long Island, Rockaway Beach in NY City, Cape May, New Jersey, Norfolk, Virginia, and Key West and Pensacola, Florida. Bases were also established at San Diego, California, and Coco Solo in the Panama Canal Zone.

== Operational history ==
The 16 original B-types operated extensively from the East coast bases starting in October 1917, mostly on training missions, but also patrol operations. Several B-Class airships were lost. At least one was involved in a search and rescue operation for a downed Navy float plane. B-types also operated from San Diego and Coco Solo.

One Chatham-based B-type was involved in spotting a U-boat and called in seaplanes to attempt an attack. The B-type airships operated some 13,500 hours covering some 300,000 square miles and trained over 160 Naval Aviators in airship operations.

In mid-1918 or early-1919 three gondolas were rebuilt by Goodyear as B-17, -18, and -19 They were given new Bureau Numbers (A-5464, A-5465 and A-5467) The new airships had pusher engines ( B-1 through B16 had tractor engines). Goodyear also built one new car which appears to have been the B-20 (BuNo A-5257).

It is believed that the B-type airships were painted olive drab. Other sources have them being painted with aluminum powdered dope. One suffered a chemical reaction in the rubber coating and turned pink, it was nicknamed "The Pink Lady."

Many of the "B"s were stricken soon after the Armistice. The Navy Table (there are two dates, May and September 1919, lists the B-Class airships to remain in service. They were B-1, B-3, B-8, B-17, B-18 and B-19). Two, B-3 and B-15, survived until 1924.

Though the B-Class airships were deployed late in the war their operations influenced Lighter-than-Air policy in the period between the wars. "the airship's greatest value to the allies during the past war was in convoy work. Indeed, it was common knowledge that a submarine would not attack a convoy escorted by airships. The value depended not so much on their ability to detect a submarine previous to its attack . . . but on the certainty of their locating the submarine after a torpedo attack, with the resultant destruction of the submarine by depth charges from either the airship or surface escort."

== Operators ==
United States

- United States Navy

== Specifications (Curtiss-built B-type) ==
General characteristics

- Length: 163 ft 0 in (49.70 m)
- Diameter: 31 ft 6 in (9.60 m)
- Volume: 84,000 cu ft (2,380 m^{3})
- Powerplant: 1 × Curtiss OXX V-8 , 100 hp (37 kW)

Performance

- Maximum speed: 47 mph (76 km/h, 41 kn)
- Cruise speed: 35 mph (56 km/h, 30 kn)
- Range: 927 mi (1,492 km, 806 nmi)
- Endurance: 26 hours 30 minutes

Armament

- 1 × .303 Lewis gun

== See also ==
- List of airships of the United States Navy
