= E-class blimp =

E class
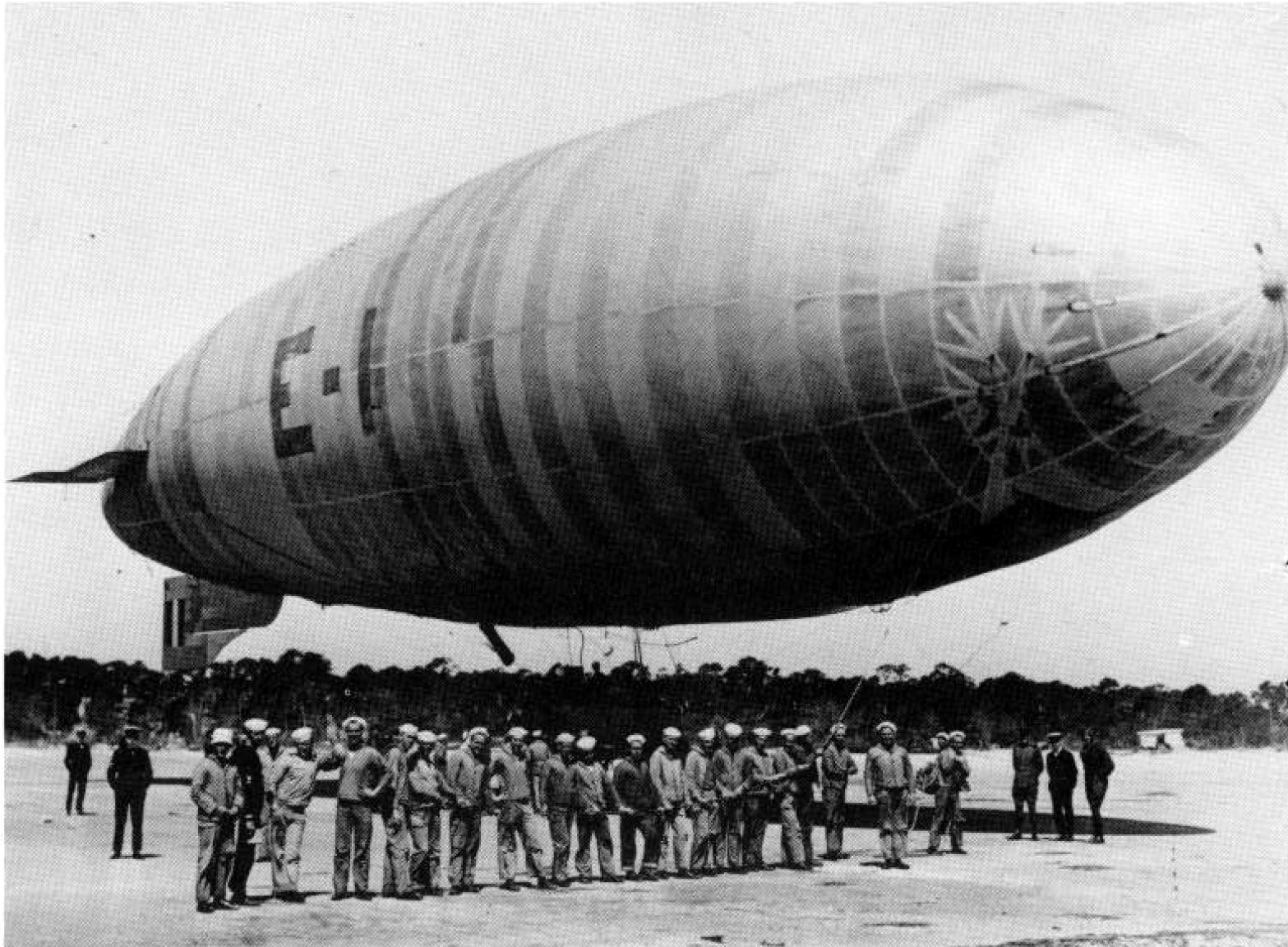
- NAVY E-1

General information
- Type: Training airship
- Manufacturer: Goodyear-Zeppelin Corporation
- Primary user: US Navy
- Number built: 1

History
- Introduction date: 1918
- Retired: 1924

The E class of US Navy blimps comprised a single airship, built during World War I by Goodyear as one of a group of three small blimps offered to the US government. Two were purchased for the US Navy and one for the US Army. The Navy blimps were designated E-1, F-1, and the Army airship A-1. These airships had identical envelopes but different cars. The E-1 was delivered to Pensacola, Florida in December 1918. It was flown only at Pensacola serving as a trainer at the Airship School. A new envelope was provided in December 1920. E-1 was retired from service sometime in 1924.

== Operators ==
United States

- United States Navy

== Specifications ==
General characteristics

- Crew: Three
- Length: 162 ft 0 in (49.39 m)
- Diameter: 33 ft 0 in (10.06 m)
- Height: 49 ft 6 in (15.09 m)
- Volume: 95,000 cu ft (2,690 m^{3})
- Useful lift: 2,050 lb (930 kg)
- Powerplant: 1 × Thomas-Morse , 145 hp (108 kW)

Performance

- Maximum speed: 56 mph (90 km/h, 49 kn)
- Cruise speed: 35 mph (56 km/h, 30 kn)
- Range: 695 mi (1,115 km, 604 nmi)
- Endurance: 19 hours 12 minutes
- Service ceiling: 8,000 ft (2,440 m)

== See also ==
Related lists

- List of airships of the United States Navy
