= List of airships of the United States Navy =

Ships of the United States Navy

Ships in current service
- Current ships

Ships grouped alphabetically
- A–B; C; D–F; G–H; I–K; L; M; N–O; P; Q–R; S; T–V; W–Z

Ships grouped by type
- Aircraft carriers; Airships; Amphibious warfare ships; Auxiliaries; Battlecruisers; Battleships; Cruisers; Destroyers; Destroyer escorts; Destroyer leaders; Escort carriers; Frigates; Hospital ships; Littoral combat ships; Mine warfare vessels; Monitors; Oilers; Patrol vessels; Registered civilian vessels; Sailing frigates; Steam frigates; Steam gunboats; Ships of the line; Sloops of war; Submarines; Torpedo boats; Torpedo retrievers; Unclassified miscellaneous; Yard and district craft

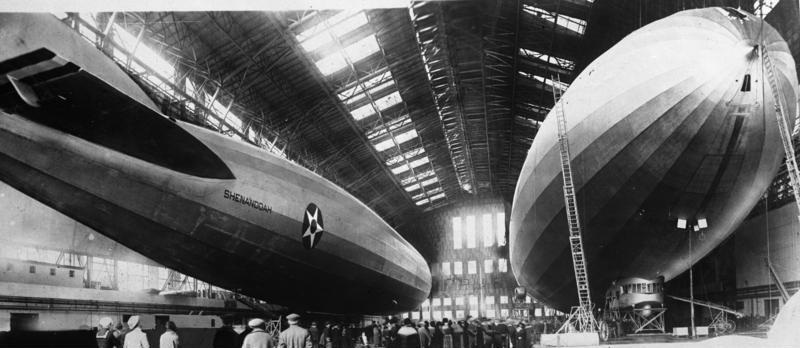
USS Shenandoah (ZR-1), left and USS Los Angeles (ZR-3), right, in 1924 in Hangar No. 1, Lakehurst, New Jersey

List of airships of the United States Navy identifies the airships of the United States Navy by type, identification, and class.

== Rigid airships (ZR) ==
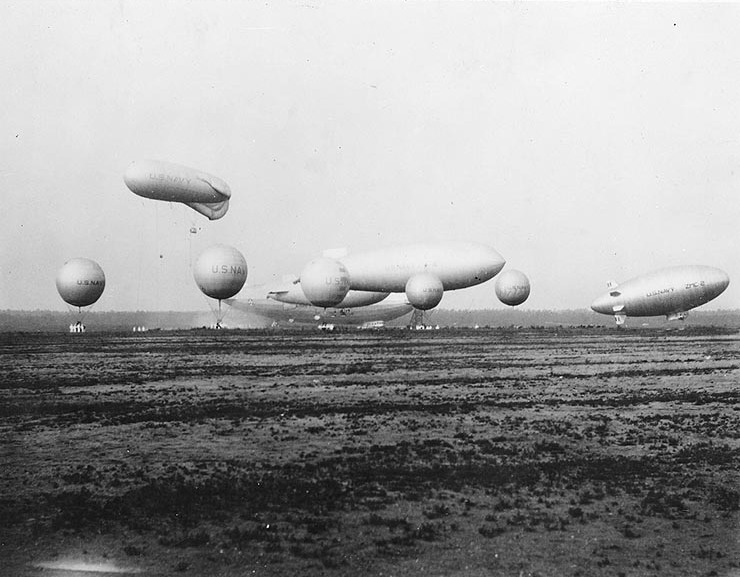
In the background, Los Angeles, in front of it, (l to r) J-3 or 4, K-1, ZMC-2, in front of them, "Caquot" observation balloon, and in foreground free balloons used for training. US Navy airships and balloons, 1931

=== Fabric-clad rigid airships ===
The fabric-clad rigid airships were given commissions, the same as warships.

- USS Shenandoah (ZR-1) - served 1923-25, lost 3 September 1925 due to structural failure while in line squalls, 14 killed
- (ZR-2) - British-built as R38, lost 24 August 1921 before US Navy acceptance (and before official use of the ZR-2 designation) due to severe control inputs at low altitude and high speed far in excess of structural strength, 44 killed including 16 USN personnel
- USS Los Angeles (ZR-3) - German-built as LZ 126, served 1924-39 (decommissioned 1932, and dismantled 1940)

Akron class

- USS Akron (ZRS-4) - aircraft carrier served 1931-33, lost 4 April 1933 in a storm, 73 killed
- USS Macon (ZRS-5) - aircraft carrier served 1933-35, lost 12 February 1935 due to structural failure, 2 killed

(ZRCV), proposed successor to the Akron class, not built

== Other airships ==
All other airships were registered as aircraft.

=== Metal rigid airships ===
- ZMC-2, a metalclad-airship built by the Aircraft Development Corp - 1929-41 (scrapped)

=== Semi-rigid airships ===
- O-1 Airship

=== Blimps (non-rigid airships) ===
- A class blimp (experimental)
- B class blimp (patrol & training)
- C class blimp (patrol)
- D class blimp (patrol)
- E class blimp (trainer)
- F class blimp (trainer)
- G class blimp (trainer & utility airship) (ZNN-G) (ZGT)
- H class blimp (observation)
- J class blimp (trainer)
- K-1 blimp (experimental)
- K class blimp (anti-submarine patrol) (ZNP-K)
  - (ZSG-2, ZSG-3, ZSG-4, ZP5K)
- L class blimp (trainer) (ZNN-L)
- M class blimp (anti-submarine patrol) (ZNP-M)
- N class blimp (anti-submarine patrol & AEW) (ZPN-1, ZPG-1)
  - (ZPG-2, ZPG-2W)
  - (ZPG-3W), largest blimp ever built
- TC class blimp - transferred from US Army
- MZ-3A (experimental) first Navy airship in 40 years

== Gallery ==
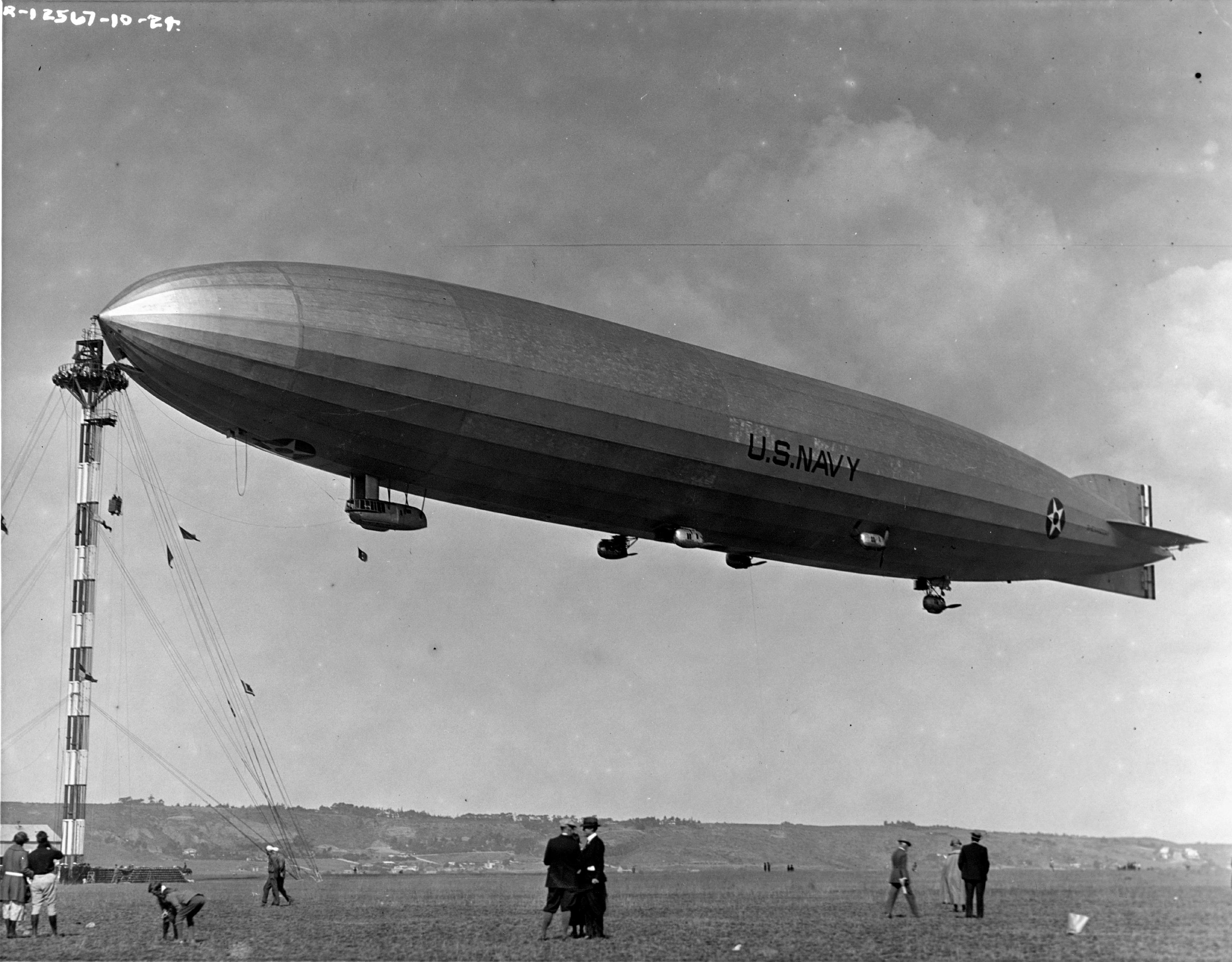
USS Shenandoah (ZR-1)

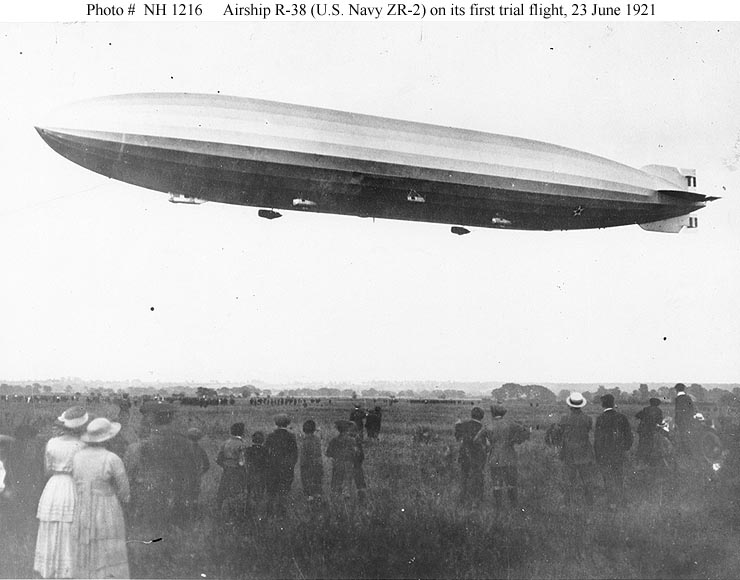
R38 / ZR-2

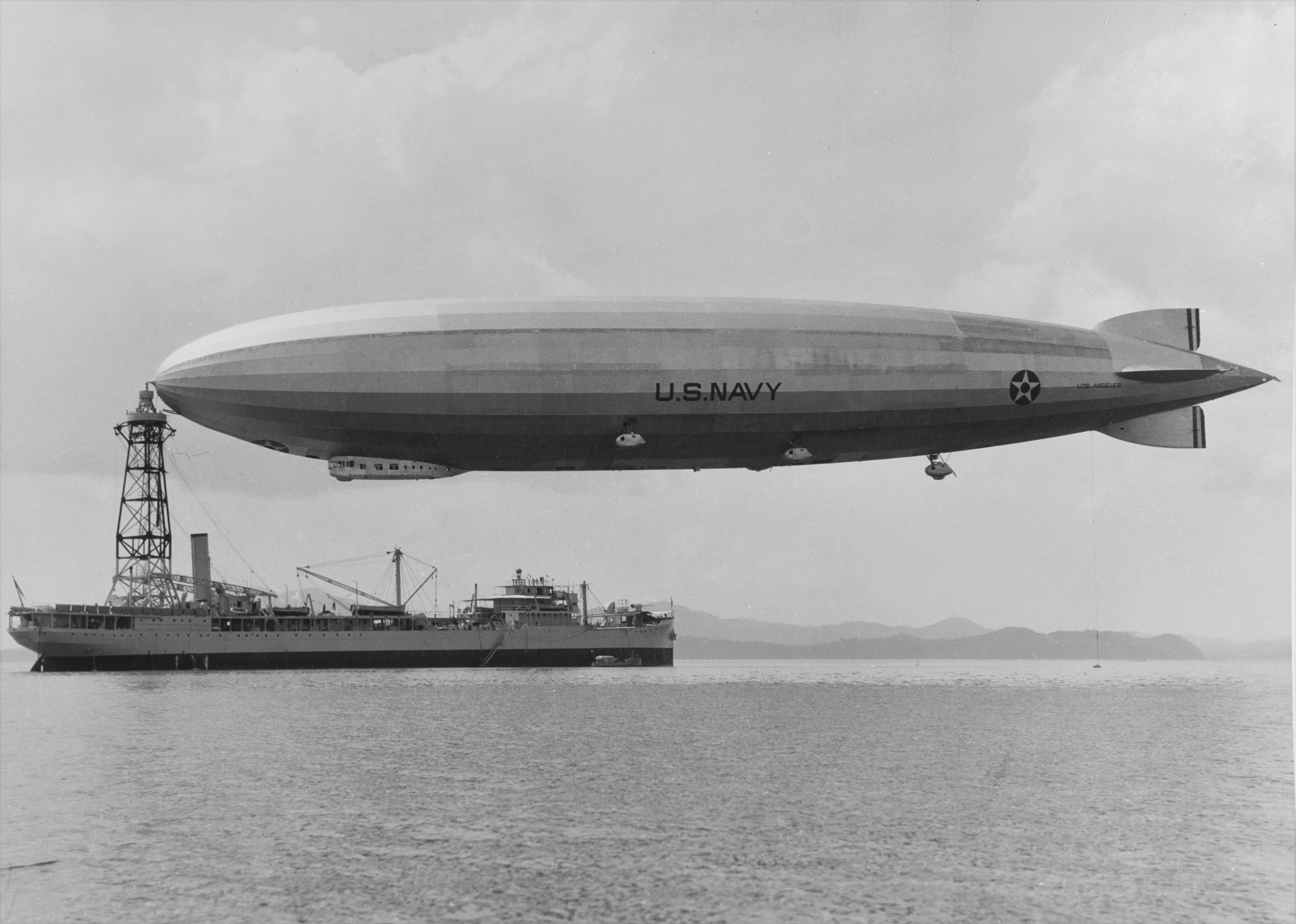
USS Los Angeles (ZR-3)

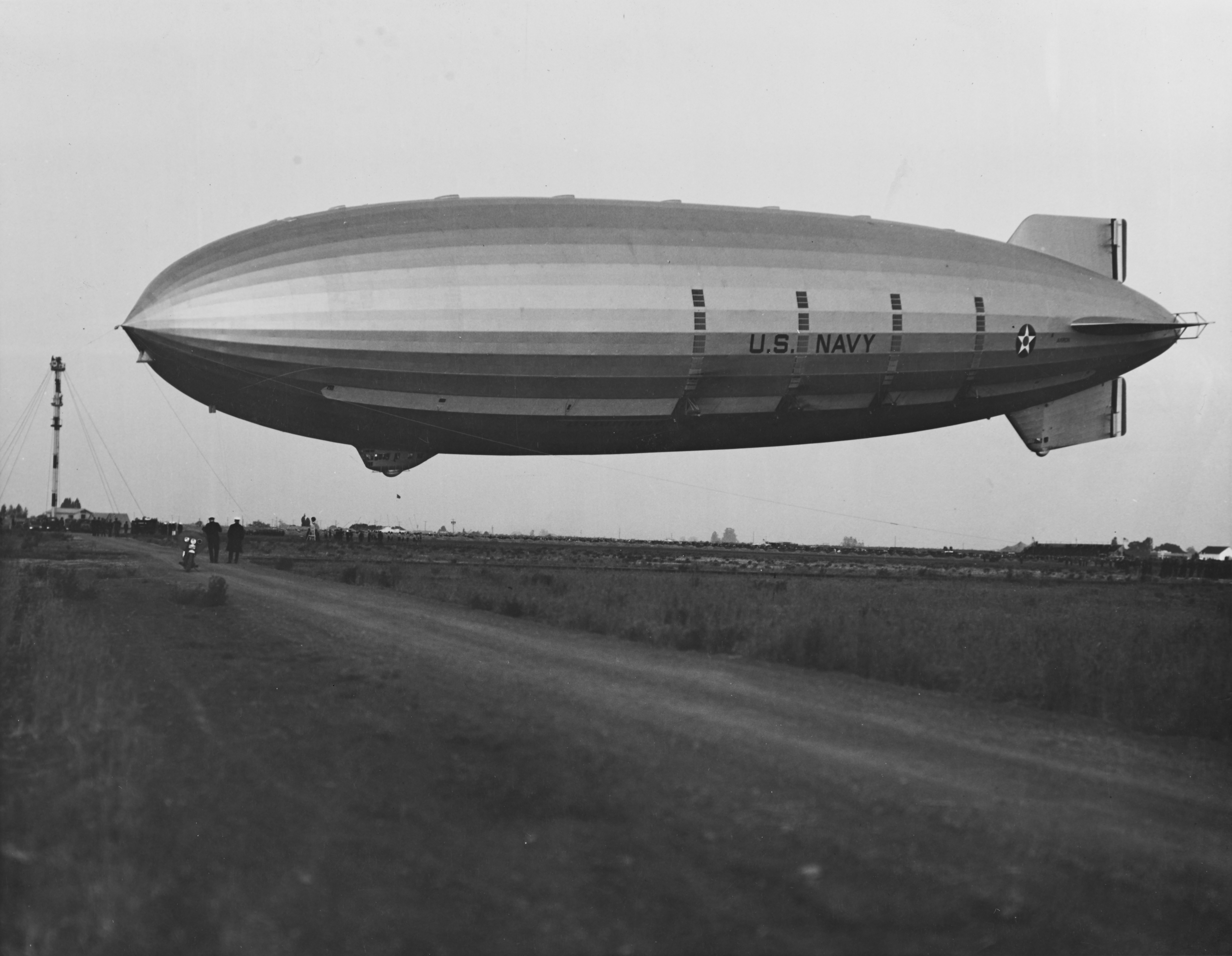
USS Akron (ZRS-4)

== See also ==
- British blimps operated by the USN
- French Blimps operated by the USN
- Piasecki PA-97
- US Army airships
- List of United States Navy ships
