= F-class blimp =

F class
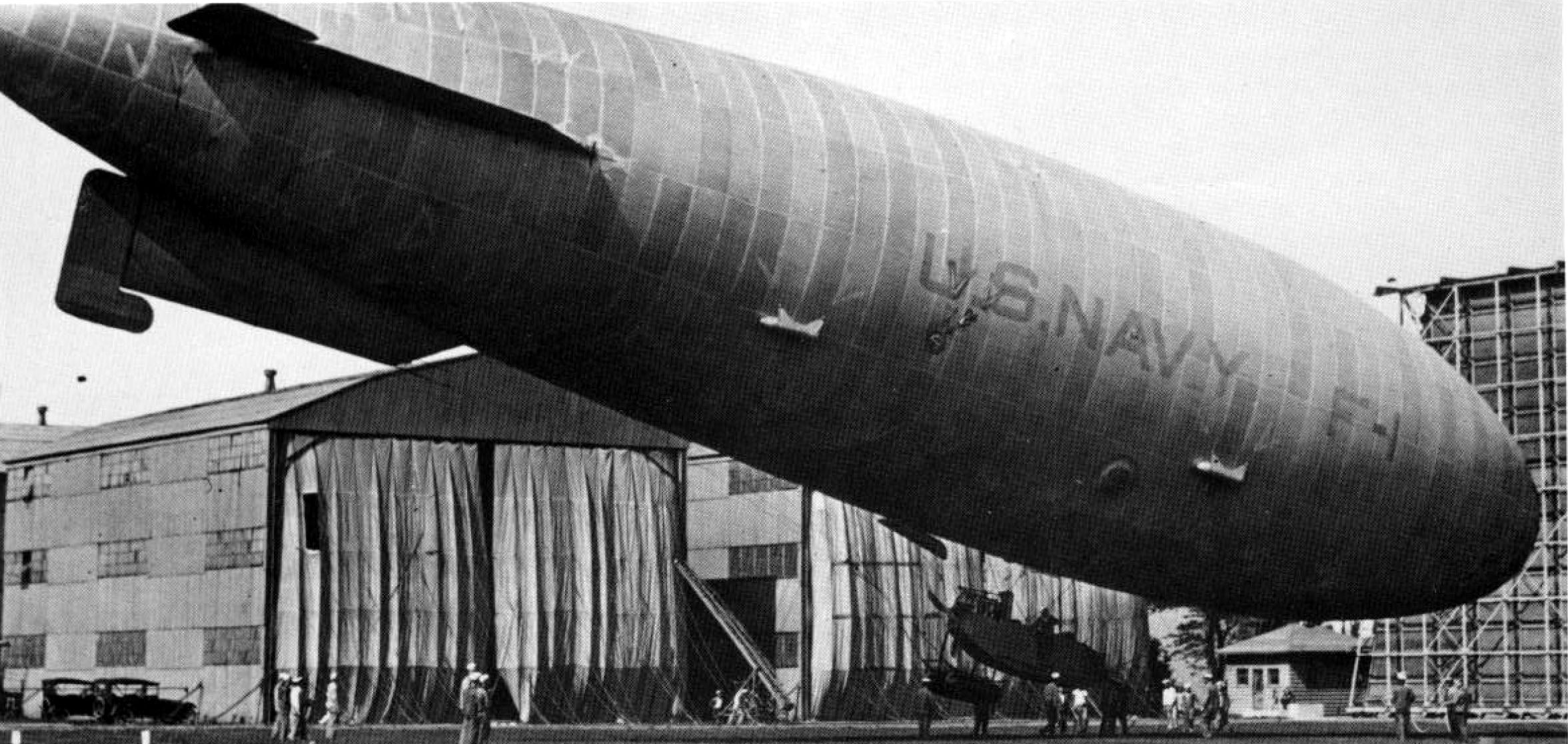
- NAVY F-1

General information
- Type: Engine testbed
- Manufacturer: Goodyear-Zeppelin Corporation
- Primary user: US Navy
- Number built: 1

History
- Introduction date: 1918
- Retired: 1923

The F class of US Navy blimps comprised a single airship, built during World War I by Goodyear as one of a group of three small blimps offered to the US government. Two were purchased for the US Navy and one for the US Army. The Navy blimps were designated E-1, F-1, and the Army airship A-1. Classified as an "Experimental Engine Testing Dirigible." F-1 had the same envelope size as the E-1, due to the use of a tractor mounted 125 hp Union engine, the performance was different. F-1 spent its entire career at Hampton Roads (Norfolk, Virginia). It was flown in both tractor and pusher configurations. It also may have been flown with a Curtiss OXX engine. F-1 was removed from inventory in November 1923.

== Specifications ==
General characteristics

- Crew: Three
- Length: 162 ft 0 in (49.39 m)
- Diameter: 33 ft 0 in (10.06 m)
- Height: 49 ft 6 in (15.09 m)
- Volume: 95,000 cu ft (2,690 m^{3})
- Useful lift: 2,300 lb (1,043 kg)
- Powerplant: 1 × Union , 125 hp (93 kW)

Performance

- Maximum speed: 52 mph (84 km/h, 45 kn)
- Cruise speed: 34 mph (55 km/h, 30 kn)
- Range: 1,414 mi (2,269 km, 1,229 nmi)
- Endurance: 34 hours 12 minutes
- Service ceiling: 8,000 ft (2,440 m)

== See also ==
Related lists

- List of airships of the United States Navy
