= Berkmans Speed Scout =

Speed Scout
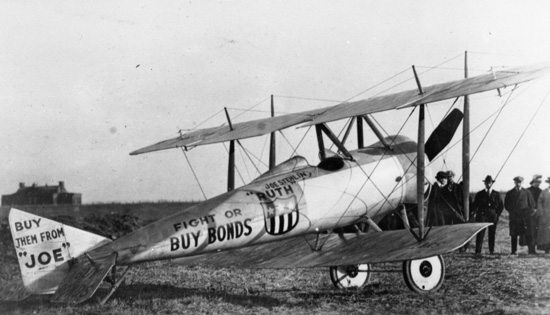

General information
- Type: Scout Aircraft
- Designer: Maurice and Emile Berkmans
- Number built: 1

History
- First flight: 1917

The Berkmans Speed Scout was an early American biplane scout built by the Berkmans brothers for the United States Army Air Service. It was tested in 1918 with positive results, but the end of World War I meant no production order was received, and no more aircraft were built.

== Specifications ==
Data from Angelucci, 1987. pp. 58.

General characteristics

- Crew: 1
- Length: 18 ft 0 in (5.49 m)
- Wingspan: 26 ft 0 in (7.92 m)
- Height: 8 ft 0 in (2.44 m)
- Empty weight: 820 lb (372 kg)
- Gross weight: 1,190 lb (540 kg)
- Powerplant: 1 × Gnome Monosoupape 9 Type B-2 , 100 hp (75 kW)

Performance

- Maximum speed: 115 mph (185 km/h, 100 kn)
- Endurance: 2 hours 30 minutes
- Service ceiling: 22,000 ft (6,706 m)
- Rate of climb: 1,100 ft/min (5.58 m/s)
