= United States military aircraft national insignia =

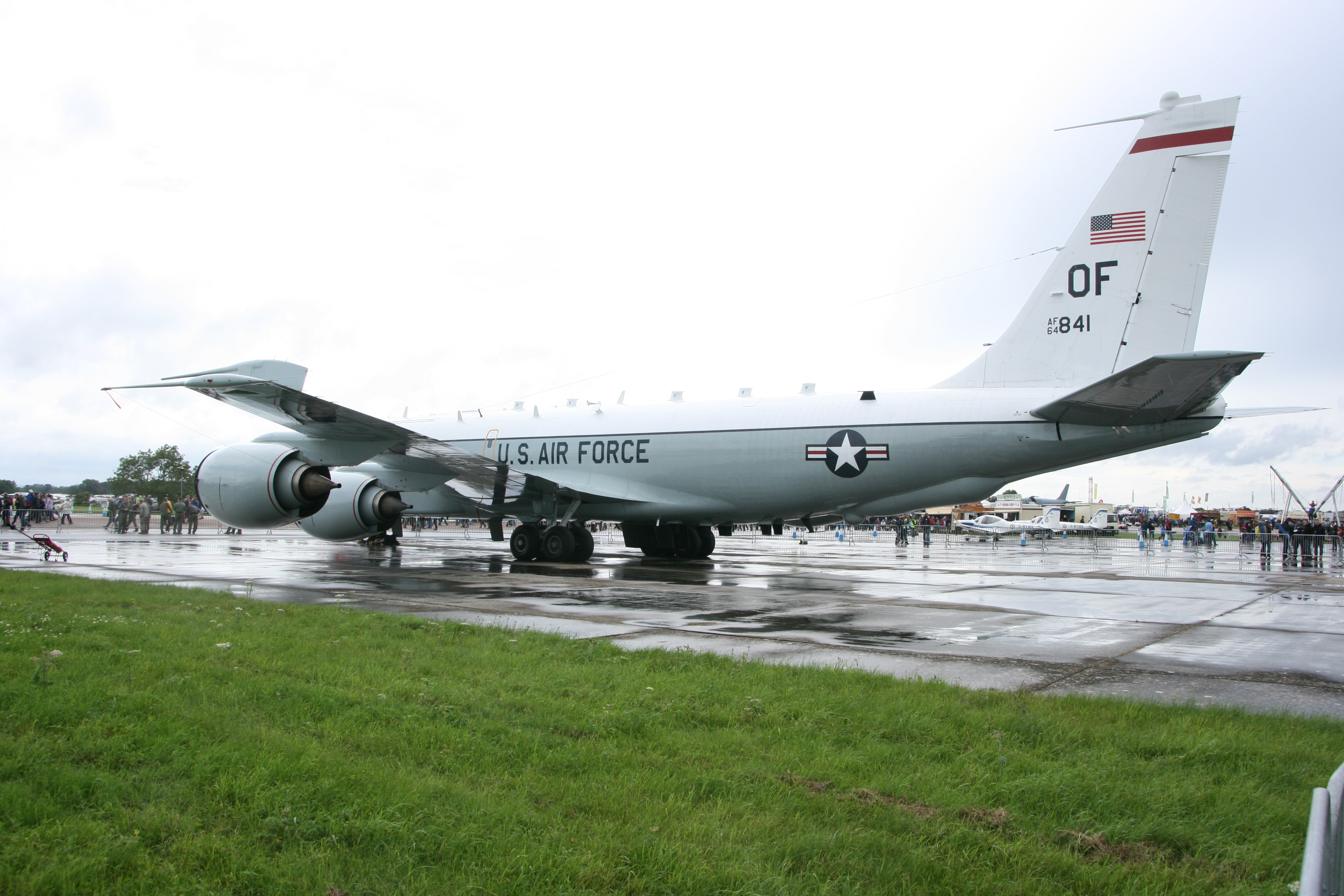
A USAF RC-135V in the standard livery with the label indicating its service branch, the insignia in full colors, and the national flag on its tail fin.

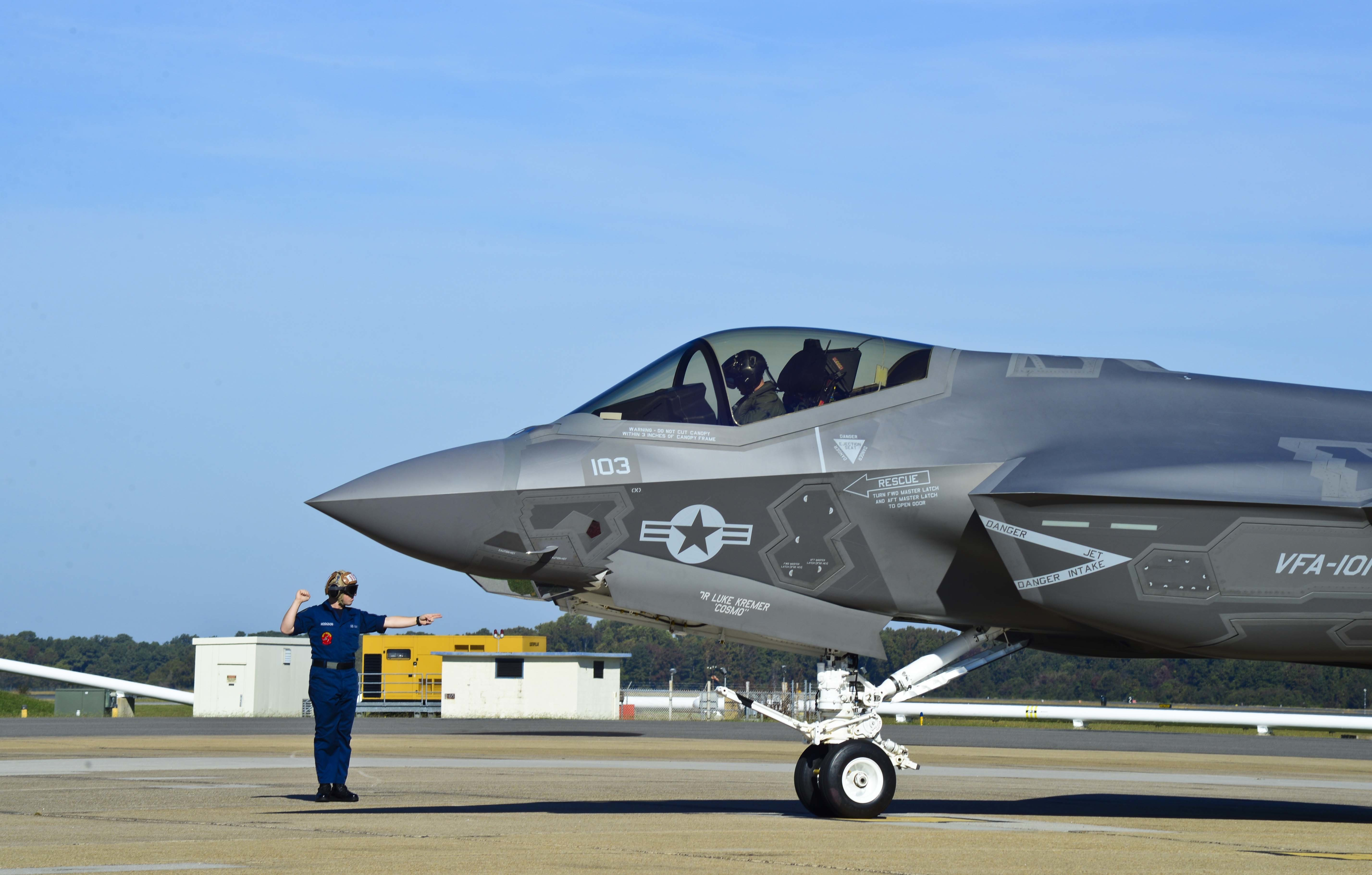
A US Navy Lockheed Martin F-35C Lightning II with low-visibility insignia on fuselage.

This is a listing of the nationality markings used by military aircraft of the United States, including those of the U.S. Air Force, U.S. Navy, U.S. Marine Corps, U.S. Coast Guard, U.S. Army and their predecessors. The Civil Air Patrol is also included for the World War II period because it engaged in combat operations (primarily anti-submarine flights) which its July 1946 charter has since explicitly forbidden.

== History ==
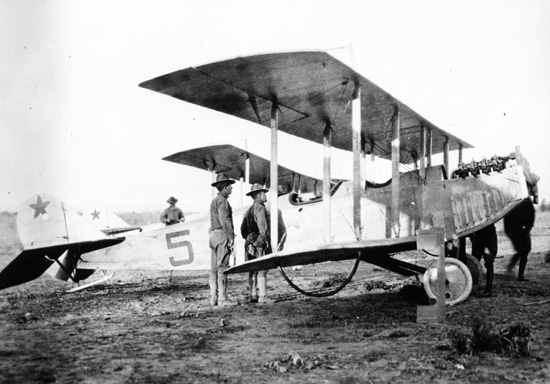
U.S. Army Signal Corps Curtiss JN-3 biplanes with red star insignia, 1915

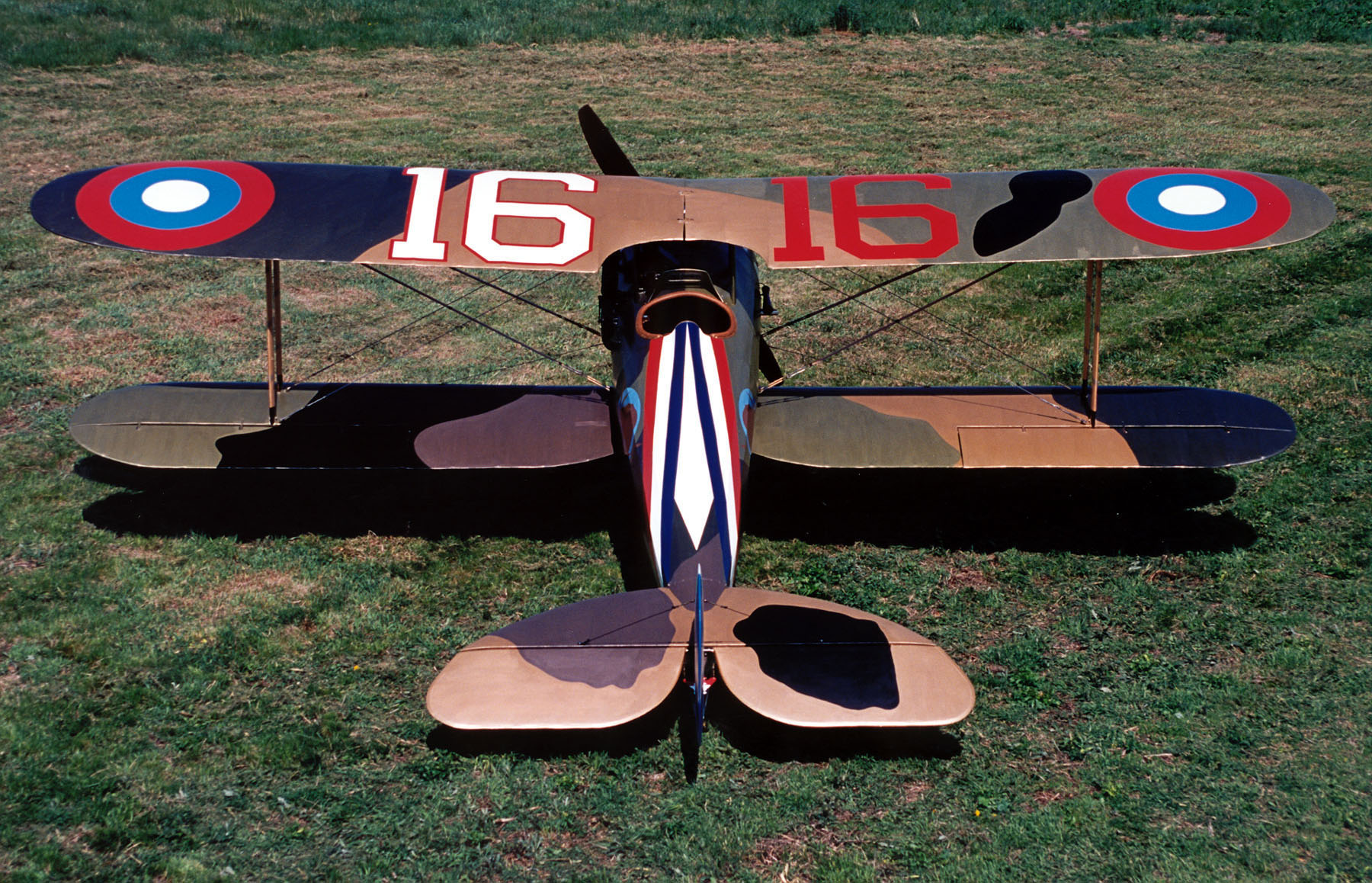
Nieuport 28 with the World War 1 era American roundels

The first military aviation insignias of the United States include a star used by the US Army Signal Corps Aviation Section, seen during the Pancho Villa punitive expedition, just over a year before American involvement in World War I began. The star was painted only on the vertical tail, in either red (the most often used color) or blue (less likely, due to the strictly orthochromatic photography of that era, rendering the red star as a black one in period photos). At the same time, the US Navy was using a blue anchor on the rudders of its seaplanes.

=== After American entry into World War I ===
As of 19 May 1917 all branches of the military, outside of the Western Front of Europe were to use a circular dark-blue field containing the single, five-pointed regular pentagram-outline white star, symbolic of a U.S. state from the national flag, itself containing a central red circle, painted in the official flag colors.

The unique USMC roundel of 1918-1922

A tricolor roundel was introduced by the US Army Air Service in February 1918 for commonality with the other European Allies, all of whom used similar roundels. American aircraft also used vertically striped British and French style tricolors on the rudders during World War I, the British and French markings having the blue stripe forward, while American regulations specified that their aircraft have the red stripe forward although some of their aircraft had the colors in the French order. The order of the USAAS roundel's colors were similar to those of the defunct Imperial Russian Air Service. No connection existed between the US roundel and other Allied forces' military aircraft services, beyond the fact that the United States had joined the Allies of World War I and was using a tricolor roundel in what was now an available order. Tsarist aircraft often used a significantly larger white central circle, while the narrower red and blue rings on such large white-centered variant insignia were often separated with additional white rings. From at least as early as the timeframe of the deployment of the First Marine Aviation Force in France during July 1918 until roughly 1922, the USMC's aviation units added an American eagle atop the roundel and a fouled anchor superimposed behind the roundel, mimicking the Eagle, Globe, and Anchor emblem on the fuselage sides in the manner of a unit insignia.

=== Post-WW I and interwar period ===
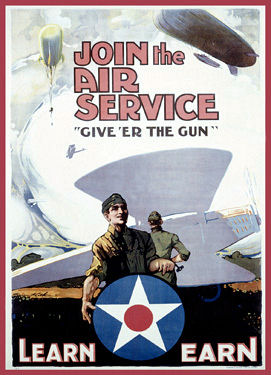
World War I US Army Air Service recruiting poster showing the new late-1917 roundel

In May 1917 the US adopted a red circle-centered white star in a dark blue circular field for all United States military aircraft. In August 1919, following the Armistice that ended World War I, the colors were adjusted to the current standards and the proportions were adjusted slightly so that the centre red circle was reduced slightly from being 1/3 of the diameter of the blue circular field, to being bound by the edges of an imaginary regular pentagon connecting the inner points of the star.

=== American entry into World War II ===
The US Army Air Corps began painting its roundel on only the top of the left wing and only the bottom of the right wing February 26, 1941, intended to help facilitate recognition of friend and foe if the United States became embroiled in the spreading conflict. The other reason was to “eliminate a balanced target” by presenting a somewhat asymmetrical effect — if you see two white stars (i.e., one on each wing), it is easier to aim your guns between them. The US Navy resisted this change and reverted to the roundel on each wing early in the war January 5, 1942. However, the US Navy finally adopted the asymmetrical single wing insignia February 1, 1943.

In the months after Pearl Harbor - following the late-June 1941 conversion of the USAAC into the United States Army Air Forces - it was thought that the central red dot could be mistaken for a Japanese Hinomaru, from a distance and in May 1942 it was eliminated. On aircraft in service they were painted over with white. During November 1942, US forces participated in the Torch landings and for this a chrome yellow ring (of unspecified thickness) was temporarily added to the outside of the roundel to reduce incidents of Americans shooting down unfamiliar British aircraft, which could themselves be distinguished by a similar yellow outline on the RAF's "Type C.1" fuselage roundels of the time.

None of these solutions was entirely satisfactory as friendly fire incidents continued and so the US Government initiated a study that discovered that the red wasn't the issue since color couldn't be determined from a distance anyway, but the shape could be. After trying out several variations including an oblong roundel with two stars, they arrived at using white bars flanking the sides of the existing roundel, all with a red outline, which became official in June 1943. This still wasn't entirely satisfactory and at least one operational unit refused to add the red, resulting in bare white bars on the existing star roundel. The red outline was then replaced with a blue outline whose color exactly matched the round blue field that held the star in September 1943. On US Navy aircraft painted overall in gloss midnight blue starting in 1944, the blue color of the roundels was similar to midnight blue, so the blue portion was eventually dispensed with and only the white portion of the roundel was painted on the aircraft. In the Pacific Theater, some British Commonwealth aircraft in service with the British Pacific Fleet, and Royal New Zealand Air Force, as with Lend Lease Chance Vought F4U Corsairs, began to officially sport the white "bars" as a more-or-less "universal" symbol on Allied aircraft opposing the Japanese, while also eliminating the red center of the roundels they used for the same reason the United States already had.

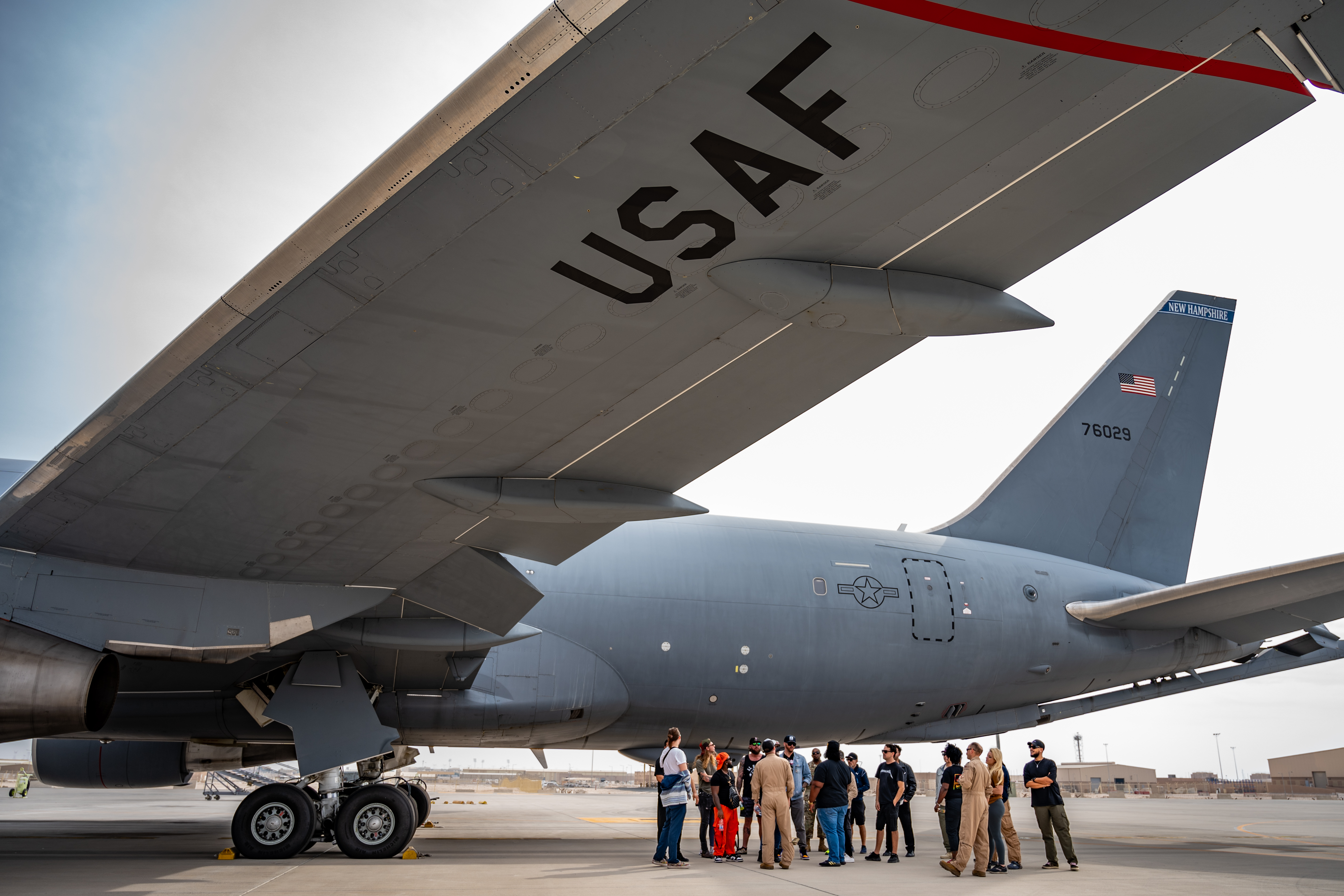
A KC-46A with the service branch designation (USAF) below the wing, low-visibility roundel on the fuselage, and the fully-colored national flag on the tail.

=== Cold War (1945-1991) to present ===
In January 1947, single bisecting, lengthwise-running red bars, one per side, were added within the existing white bars on both USN and USAAF aircraft – both replacing the old center red circle, and restoring the official presence of a red device in the insignia, much as with the red stripes of the American flag – and in September of the same year, the United States Army Air Forces (USAAF) became an independent service and was renamed the United States Air Force (USAF).

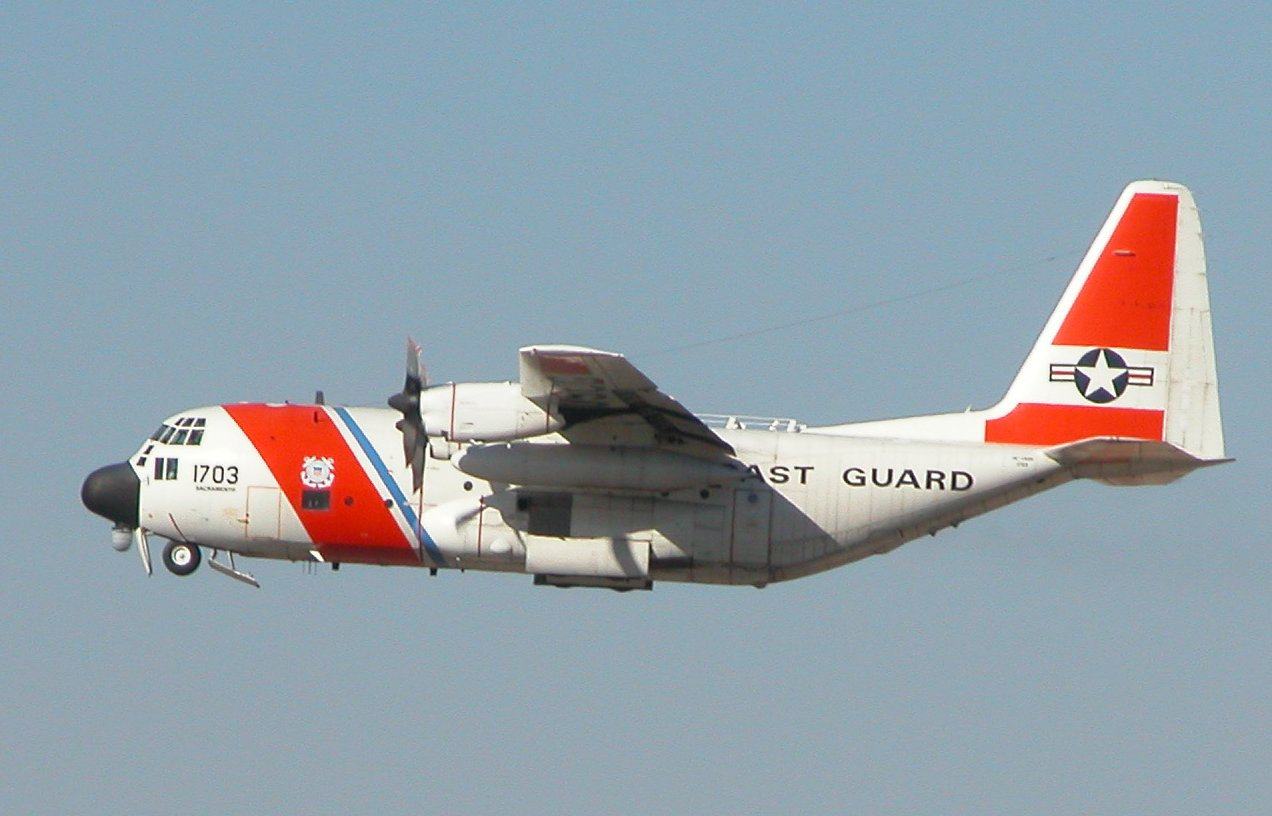
The U.S. Coast Guard uses the national roundel as a fin flash on its fixed-wing aircraft, instead of on the fuselage

In 1955 the USN would repaint all its aircraft from midnight blue to light grey over white and would use exactly the same roundel as the USAF again. Since then there have been some minor variations, mostly having to do with low-visibility versions of the star and bars roundel. Air superiority F-15s eliminated the blue outline in the 1970s, and later some aircraft replaced the blue and red with black or a countershaded color, or used a stencil to create an outlined "low-visibility" version. Almost all USAF aircraft now use low-visibility roundels in black or gray, with the full-color version limited to a small number of uncamouflaged aircraft such as the E-3 and E-8.

Partly due to the 1964 adoption, and early-April 1967 display initiation of the "racing stripe" insignia on its fixed-wing aircraft, the United States Coast Guard, unique among U.S. military organizations, uses the standard high-visibility roundel on the vertical fin of its fixed-wing aircraft as a fin flash.

The USAF is currently calling this standardized - especially fully colored - roundel as the National Star Insignia.

== Insignia ==
Official dates refers to when a new insignia was officially ordered but implementation was not always immediate.

Insignia	Official dates		Info
Insignia	Introduced	Superseded	Info
	19 March 1916	7 February 1917	First national insignia of any type used by US military aircraft. Used by the U.S. Army Signal Corps Aviation Section's 1st Aero Squadron, while on the Pancho Villa Expedition.
	15 April 1916	19 May 1917	United States Navy anchor in blue – first official US naval aircraft insignia. Used on rudders and wings.
	17 May 1917	8 February 1918	Note larger center dot from later (1/3 diameter) and colors were Flag Red and Flag Blue as specified for the US Flag as Old Glory Red, and Old Glory Blue.
	8 February 1918	19 August 1919	To avoid confusion with German cross, and for commonality with Allied air forces during World War I, the US changed its roundel to the disused Russian design. Colors were to be based on US flag but availability resulted in considerable variation in hues.
	19 August 1919	15 May 1942	Center red circle now inscribed within a regular pentagon formed by inner vertices of star, making red smaller than first version. Colors were Flag Red and Flag Blue until late 20s when current colors of Insignia Red and Insignia Blue were specified
	1939	1941	Neutrality marking on fuselage and sometimes wings of aircraft travelling in Europe, including Liberator transports. This flag was official from 4 July 1912 to 3 July 1959 when additional stars were added.
	1 December 1941	1 July 1946	Civil Air Patrol roundel.
	15 May 1942	28 June 1943	Insignia Red dot removed to avoid confusion with Japanese Hinomaru roundel.
	?	?	Civil Air Patrol World War II roundel. Insignia Red propeller removed to avoid confusion with Japanese Hinomaru roundel.
	October 1942	1943	Operation Torch – yellow varied in thickness, applied to roundels on fuselage and under wing but not overwing, but some units applied yellow borders on overwing roundels regardless. Yellow outermost ring likely inspired by similar, slightly darker hued British Type A.2 and C.1 roundels' outermost "rings".
	28 June 1943	14 August 1943	Experiments showed that at a distance, shapes were more important than colors, so bars were added to the roundel with an Insignia Red outline.
	28 June 1943	August 1943	Several units in the Pacific refused to paint the red outline but added white bars pending new orders for a blue outline.
	14 August 1943	14 January 1947	The Insignia Red outline was replaced with an Insignia Blue outline through the amendment of Army-Navy aeronautical specification AN-I-9 on 14 August 1943. This was followed by an amendment to Technical Order 07-1-1, issued on 24 September 1943, for units in the field. On some US Navy aircraft in the Pacific the blue outline was lighter than the insignia blue.
	31 July 1943	14 January 1947	Insignia Blue lacked contrast with the Sea Blue or Black used on some aircraft and the Insignia Blue was dispensed with. Initially applications (as on the F6F) were made without orders; however, this became official practice in January 1945.
	14 January 1947	Current	Twin Insignia Red lengthwise bars, bisecting the formerly all-white bars, were added to the roundel in reflection of 3 flag colors, roughly nine months before the official formation of the United States Air Force
	14 January 1947	23 February 1955	Sea Blue or Black aircraft
	1973	?	F-15 Air superiority Compass Ghost Scheme with 1943 blue outline removed but with red and white bars retained
	1980s	current	Low visibility marking (also seen in other colors, including with colored area broken into several colors to contrast with background camouflage pattern); principally used on tactical aircraft in low visibility schemes
	1980s	current	Low visibility marking as used on the F-117
	1980s	current	Alternate low visibility markings used on some USAF aircraft.

== Fin flashes and rudder stripes ==
Fin "Flash"	Official dates		Info
Fin "Flash"	Introduced	Superseded	Info
	19 May 1917; 19 August 1919	8 February 1918; 8 May 1942	United States Navy and United States Marine Corps, stripes optional after 10 December 1930 and mostly eliminated from Navy aircraft.
	8 February 1918	19 August 1919	"Reversed" UK Royal Air Force/French Aéronautique Militaire fin flash/rudder stripes for USAAS, United States Navy and Marine Corps aircraft during World War I and immediate post-war years, with the red stripe forwardmost.
	17 May 1919	November 1926	US Army Air Service and United States Army Air Corps.
	November 1926	12 September 1942	USAAC > 20 June 1941 > USAAF – removed from camouflaged aircraft rudder surfaces from July 1940 and all other aircraft in 1942.
	1936	8 May 1942	United States Coast Guard
	23 December 1941	6 May 1942	USN and USMC. Number of rudder surface stripes not specified until 5 January 1942 when 6 white and 7 red stripes were specified (as with November 1926 USAAC red stripes) — officially removed four months before all USAAF aircraft had removed them.
	6 April 1967	Current	Only in use on United States Coast Guard fixed-wing aircraft – the USCG "racing stripe" placed on the forward fuselage took the place normally used for the national roundel.

== See also ==
- Military aircraft insignia
- RCAF post-WWII roundels
- Royal Air Force roundels
- Tail Code

== Bibliography ==
- Archer, Robert D.; Archer, Victor G. (1997). USAAF Aircraft Markings and Camouflage 1941–1947, The History of USAAF Aircraft Markings, Insignia, Camouflage, and Colors. Schiffer Publishing. ISBN 978-0764302466.
- Bell, Dana (1995). Air Force Colors Volume 1 1926–1942. Carrollton, TX: Squadron Signal Publications. ISBN 0-89747-316-7.
- Bell, Dana (1980). Air Force Colors Volume 2: ETO & MTO 1942–1945. Carrollton, TX: Squadron Signal Publications. ISBN 978-0897471084.
- Bell, Dana (1997). Air Force Colors Volume 3: Pacific & Home Front 1942–1947. Carrollton, Texas: Squadron Signal Publications. ISBN 978-0897473767.
- Doll, Thomas E.; Jackson, Berkley R.; Riley, William A. (1983). Navy Air Colors: United States Navy, Marine Corps, and Coast Guard Aircraft Camouflage and Markings, Vol. 1, 1911–1945. Carrollton, TX: Squadron/Signal Publications. ISBN 978-0897471435.
- Doll, Thomas E.; Jackson, Berkley R.; Riley, William A. (1985). Navy Air Colors: United States Navy, Marine Corps, and Coast Guard Aircraft Camouflage and Markings, Vol. 2, 1945–1985. Carrollton, TX: Squadron/Signal Publications. ISBN 978-0897471671.
- Elliot, John M. (1989). The Official Monogram US Navy & Marine Corps Aircraft Color Guide Vol 1 1911–1939. Boylston, MA: Monogram Aviation Publications. ISBN 0-914144-31-6.
- Elliot, John M. (1989). The Official Monogram US Navy & Marine Corps Aircraft Color Guide Vol 2 1940–1949. Sturbridge, MA: Monogram Aviation Publications. ISBN 0-914144-32-4.
- Swanborough, Gordon; Bowers, Peter M. (1990). United States Navy Aircraft Since 1911. Naval Institute Press. pp. 26–32. ISBN 978-0870217920.
- Section 40.1.1.2 Color of MIL-STD-2161A (AS), the colors of this insignia are established as FED-STD-595 red 11136 white 17925 blue 15044. Visualization of colors is from http://www.colorserver.net/showcolor.asp?fs=11136+17925+)
