= DN-1 =

Naval airship

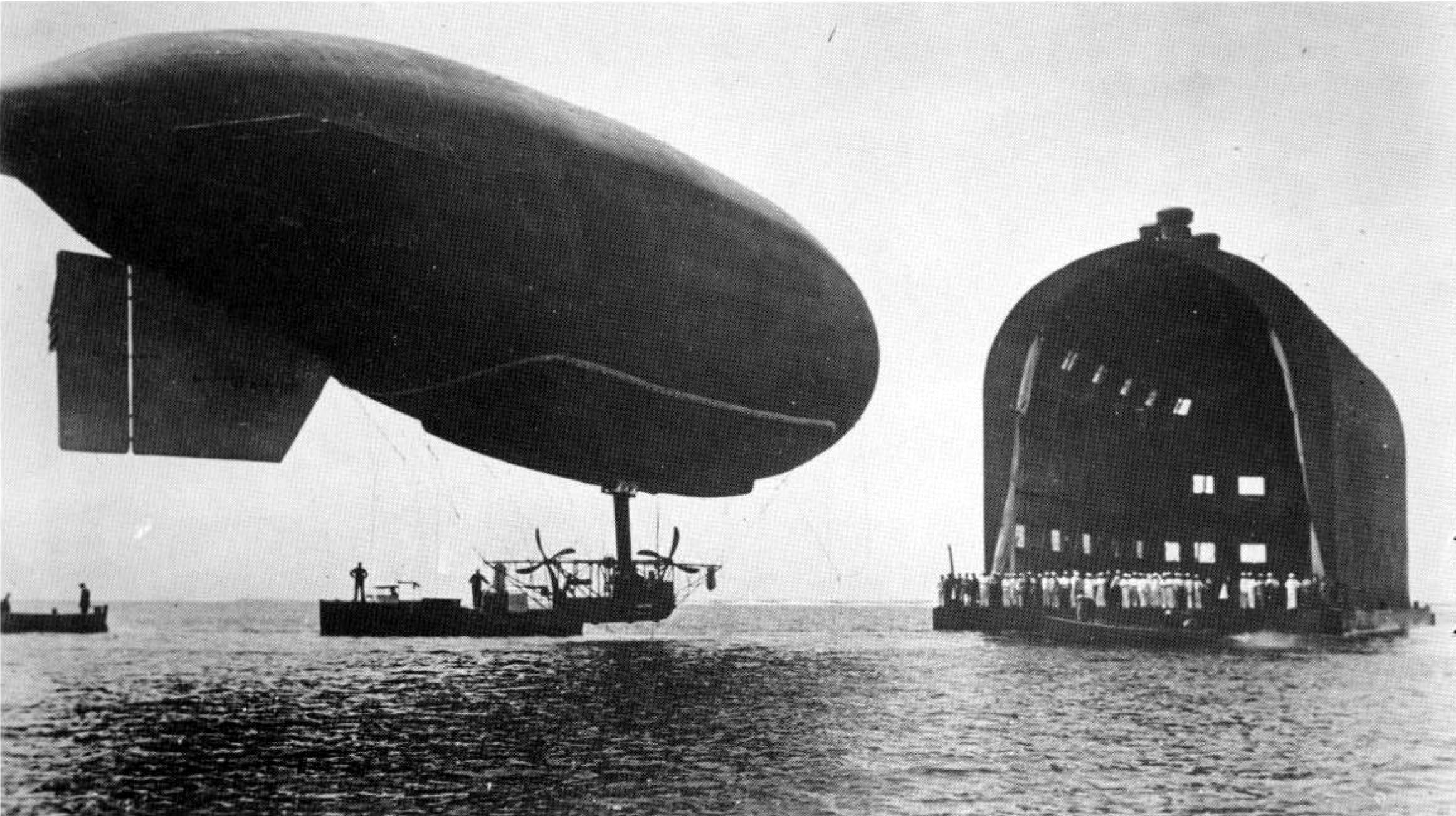
- DN-1 approaching its floating hangar at Pensacola.

General information
- Type: Experimental airship
- Manufacturer: Connecticut Aircraft
- Number built: 1

History
- First flight: 20 April 1917

The DN-1 was the United States Navy's first airship.

== Development ==
Captain Mark L. Bristol, the second Director of Naval Aviation, supported the development of the dirigible in the anti-submarine role. Victor Herbster, Holden Richardson and LCDR Frank McCrary drew up the specifications for the DN-1. The contract was awarded on 1 June 1915 to the Connecticut Aircraft Company of New Haven, CT. The U.S. Navy had no experience with airships and it seems neither had any of the principals of Connecticut Aircraft Company. They were a lawyer who was the financial backer, an amusement park owner who acted as manager; the technical staff was an Austrian, Hans Otto Stagel, who claimed to be a dirigible pilot and a German engineer and mechanic, who claimed to be Zeppelin experts. Jerome Clarke Hunsaker of MIT and his assistant Donald Wills Douglas, later founder of the Douglas Aircraft Company, aided the Connecticut Aircraft Company in the design of DN-1. The Chief Engineer was James F. Boyle and the Production Manager was J.J. DeLunay. The civilian inspector was Thomas Scott Baldwin and the resident Navy inspector was Frank M. McCrary.

The DN-1 was roughly based on the German Parseval type of non-rigid airship. The envelope was made of two layers of cloth, with rubber between them. The outer layer of fabric was yellow to prevent deterioration caused by light. The gondola control car, built by George Lawley & Son of Dorchester, Massachusetts, was a large rectangular box with two four-bladed propellers on outriggers. There were originally two engines, built by the B. F. Sturtevant Company of Hyde Park, MA, mounted in the open gondola, and the propellers could be swiveled to provide thrust in either the horizontal or vertical planes. A 1 1/2 hp (1.1 kW) Indian engine was provided to maintain air pressure in the two ballonets when the engine was not running. The gondola was water-tight as the Navy intended to operate the DN-1 to take-off from and land on water. The specification for the DN-1 provided for being capable of being moored to a mooring mast which had first been used with HMA No. 1 in 1911. The DN-1 was photographed beside a mooring mast but there appears to be no evidence it was ever moored to it.

The DN-1 was ballyhooed in the press before its flight program. The DN-1 was shipped to Pensacola, Florida, in late 1916 and assembled in a floating hangar constructed for it. The day of the planned first flight, the DN-1 was removed from its hangar, only to lose lift and sink. Crew member Petty Officer James F. Shade, up to his chin in the water, invited spectators to come aboard for "the first submerged flight of the DN-1." The DN-1 was returned to its hangar and lightened. One step taken to lighten the DN-1 was the removal of one engine.

== Operational history ==
When the test program began on 20 April 1917 the DN-1 was a disappointment. DN-1 lacked lift, barely met the speed requirement of 35 miles per hour (56 km/h) and the transmission overheated, melting the bearings. The DN-1 was piloted for its first flight by LCDR Frank M. McCrary USN, LT Stanley V. Parker assisted by PO Jimmy Shade. It was 27 April before the airship flew again. Two days later the handling party which was attempting to tow the airship across the water damaged the DN-1.The Navy decided that the airship was not worth repairing and the DN-1 was scrapped. The "Rigid Airship Manual (GPO, 1928) commented upon the DN-1 "was so overweight that it could barely lift itself off the ground. Its envelope leaked and the power plant functioned badly. It did, however, actually fly and since the firm had built the ship in good faith and at a cost greatly in excess of the contract price[$45,636], it was formally accepted."

The DN-1 was an inept failure, being barely capable of flight, delivered long after the planned time, and way over budget. The DN-1 made the Navy realize it did not have the technical skills and knowledge needed to construct airships. The authoritative Jane's All the World's Aircraft described the DN-1 as "of small size, that it was of no practical value; that it was interesting only as an experiment." The DN-1 forced the Navy to take a more effective approach to following airship development depending upon more reliable contractors and closer involvement of the Navy in design and management. The subsequent B, C, and D-Class airships were quite successful.

After its demise the DN-1 came to be considered the A class. Such designation was never officially used by the Navy, nor was it used during DN-1's short life.

== Specifications ==
General characteristics

- Length: 175 ft 0 in (53.51 m)
- Diameter: 35 ft 0 in (10.67 m)
- Volume: 115,000 cu ft (3,256.4 m^{3})
- Powerplant: 1 × Sturtevant Model 5 , 140 hp (104 kW)

Performance

- Maximum speed: 35 mph (56 km/h, 30 kn)

== See also ==
Related lists

- List of airships of the United States Navy
