= Boland 1912 Tailless Biplane =

1912 Tailless Biplane
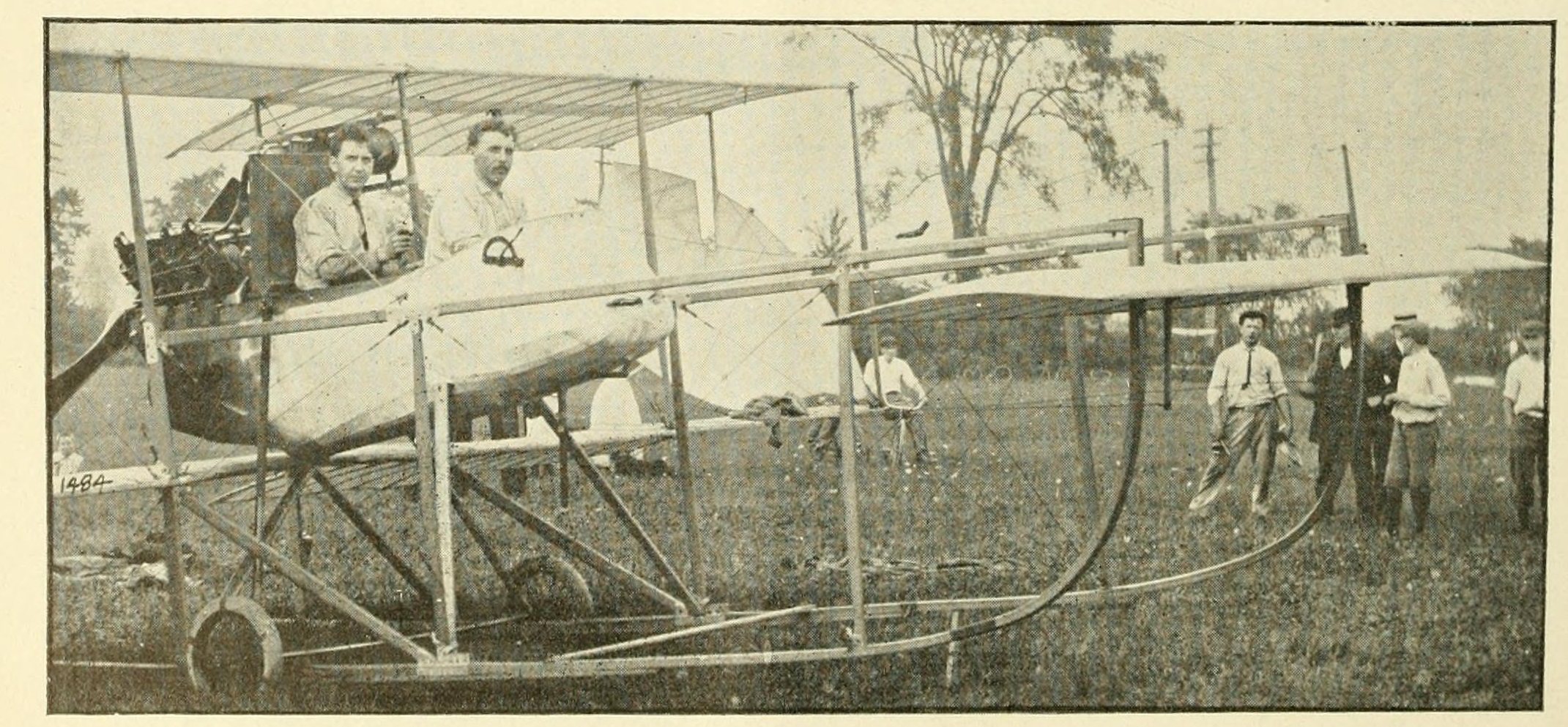
- Boland Tailless Biplane - Aeronautics magazine, March 1913

General information
- Type: Pioneer era aircraft
- National origin: United States
- Manufacturer: Boland Airplane and Motor Company
- Designer: Frank Boland

History
- First flight: 1912
- Developed from: Boland 1911 Tailless Biplane

The Boland 1912 Tailless Biplane was a refinement of the Boland 1911 Tailless Biplane. The major change in the 1912 biplane is the addition of a central nacelle that contained the pilot, passenger and the engine.

== Design and development ==
The Boland 1912 biplane was more of a refinement of Frank Boland's previous tailless aircraft. Still using the wing 'jibs' he developed for lateral control, this aircraft introduced a crudely constructed nacelle for the pilot, passenger and engine. This was the aircraft that Boland took on tour to Venezuela and the West Indies in 1912, becoming the first person to fly an aircraft in Venezuela. It was also the aircraft he was flying in Port of Spain, Trinidad on January 23, 1913 when a failure in the forward structure of the aircraft caused it to dive unexpectedly into the ground, killing him.

After Frank's death, his brother, Joseph, continued the development of the aircraft. Working with the financial backing of Inglis M. Uppercu, by 1913, he had substantially revised the nacelle and front structure of the aircraft and improved the overall fit and finish of the entire aircraft. He also had a pair of floats designed for the aircraft that could be easily bolted to each of the skids with six bolts, turning it into a seaplane.

In 1914, Uppercu bought out the Boland brothers and reorganized the Boland Airplane and Motor Company as the Aeromarine Plane and Motor Company and marketed this as the Aeromarine Model B.

== Specifications (1913-Aeromarine B) ==
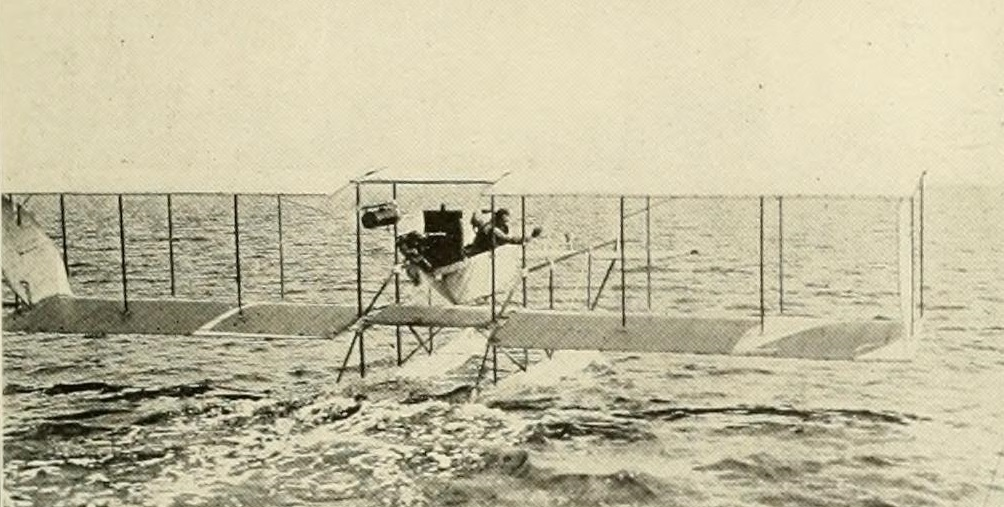
Boland 1913 Seaplane Aircraft magazine Nov. 1913 (Cropped)

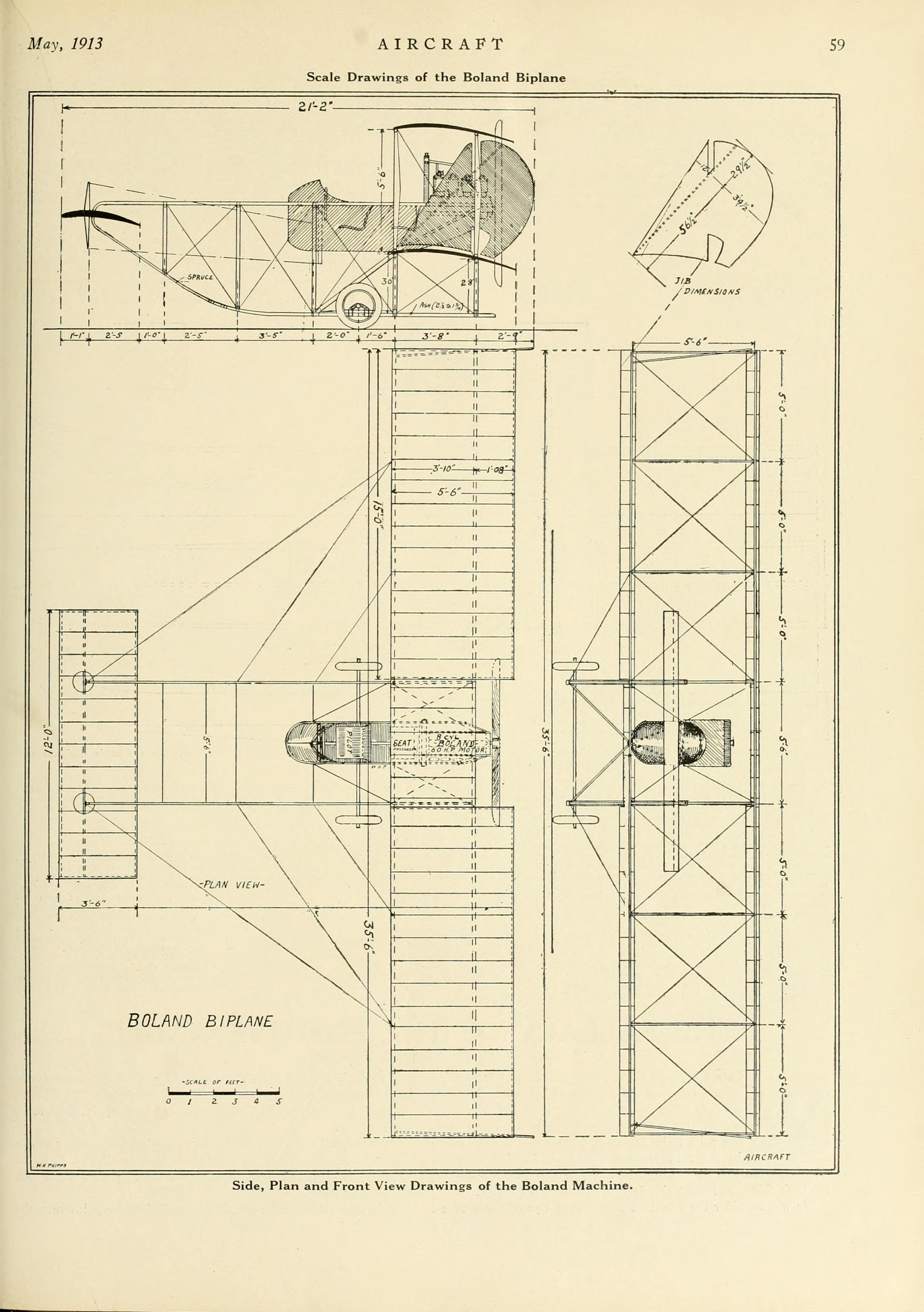
Boland 1913 (Aeromarine B) Tailless 3-view Aircraft magazine May 1913

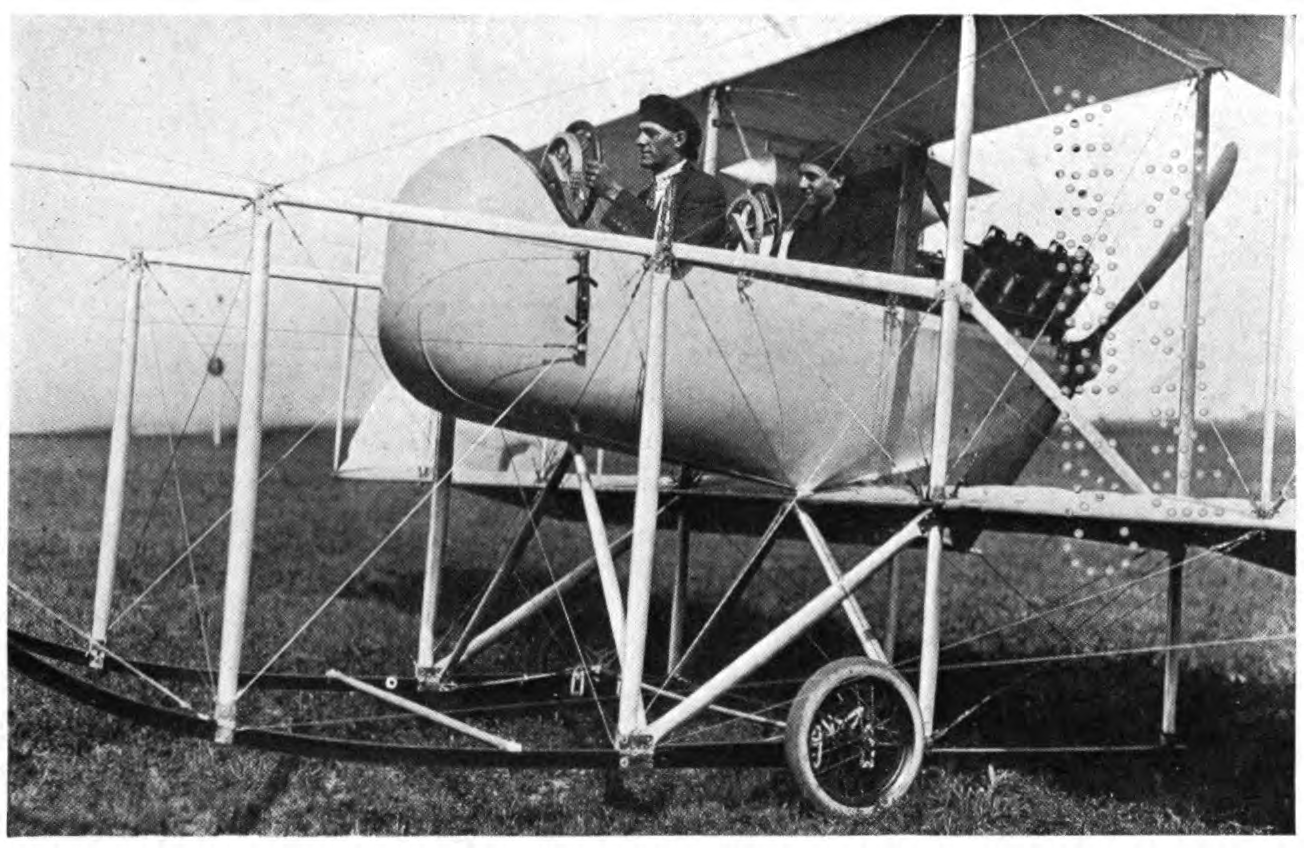
Aeromarine B Biplane Nacelle

General characteristics

- Length: 21 ft 2 in (6.45 m)
- Wingspan: 35 ft 6 in (10.82 m)
- Powerplant: 1 × Boland 60hp V-8 water-cooled piston engine, 60 hp (45 kW)

Performance
