= Aeromarine 90hp =

Aircraft motor

90 hp
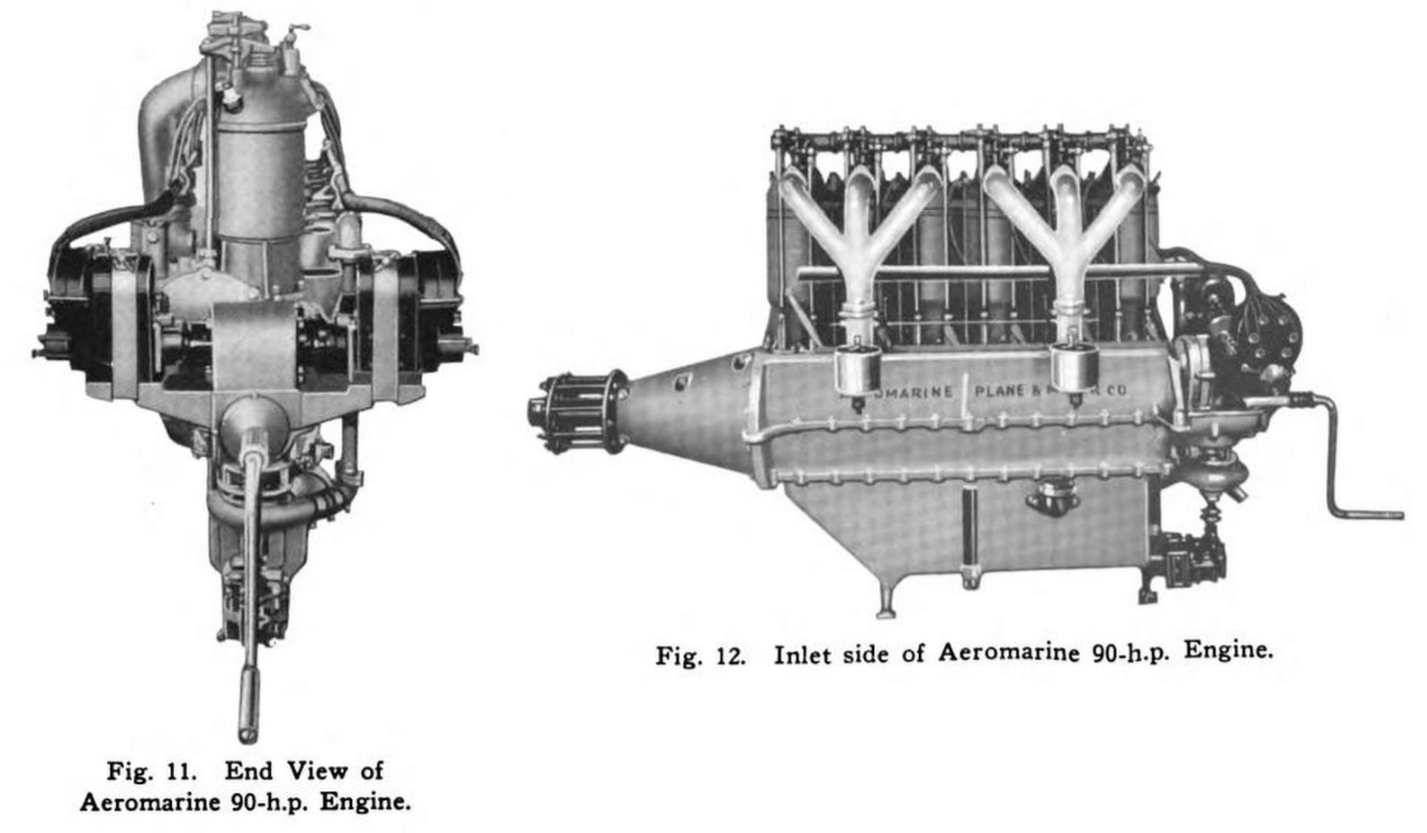
- Aeromarine 90hp
- Type: Piston aero engine
- National origin: United States
- Manufacturer: Aeromarine
- First run: 1914
- Developed into: Aeromarine K-6

The Aeromarine 90 hp was the first aircraft motor built by the Aeromarine Plane and Motor Company in 1914. In that year, Aeromarine had acquired the patents and manufacturing rights to the aircraft and engines of the Boland brothers. Although the Boland brothers didn't make a 6-cylinder engine, their V-8's all used the unusual concentric valve that is used in this engine. In spite of its model name, this engine only produced 85 hp (63 kW) at 1,400 rpm

== Developments ==
- Aeromarine K-6

== Specifications ==
Data from Airplane Engine Encyclopedia

=== General characteristics ===
- Type: 6 cylinder vertical inline piston engine
- Bore: 4.3125 in (109.54 mm)
- Stroke: 5.125 in (130.18 mm)
- Displacement: 449.16 cu in (7.36 L)
- Dry weight: 430 lb (200 kg)

=== Components ===
- Valvetrain: Concentric overhead valve
- Fuel system: 2 Zenith carburetors
- Fuel type: Gasoline
- Oil system: gear pump 12 to 15 psi (83 to 103 kPa)
- Cooling system: Water
- Ignition: 2 Bosch D-U-6 Magnetos

=== Performance ===
- Power output: 85 hp (63 kW) at 1,400 rpm; 90 hp (67 kW) nominal
