= Boland 1911 Conventional Biplane =

1911 Conventional Biplane
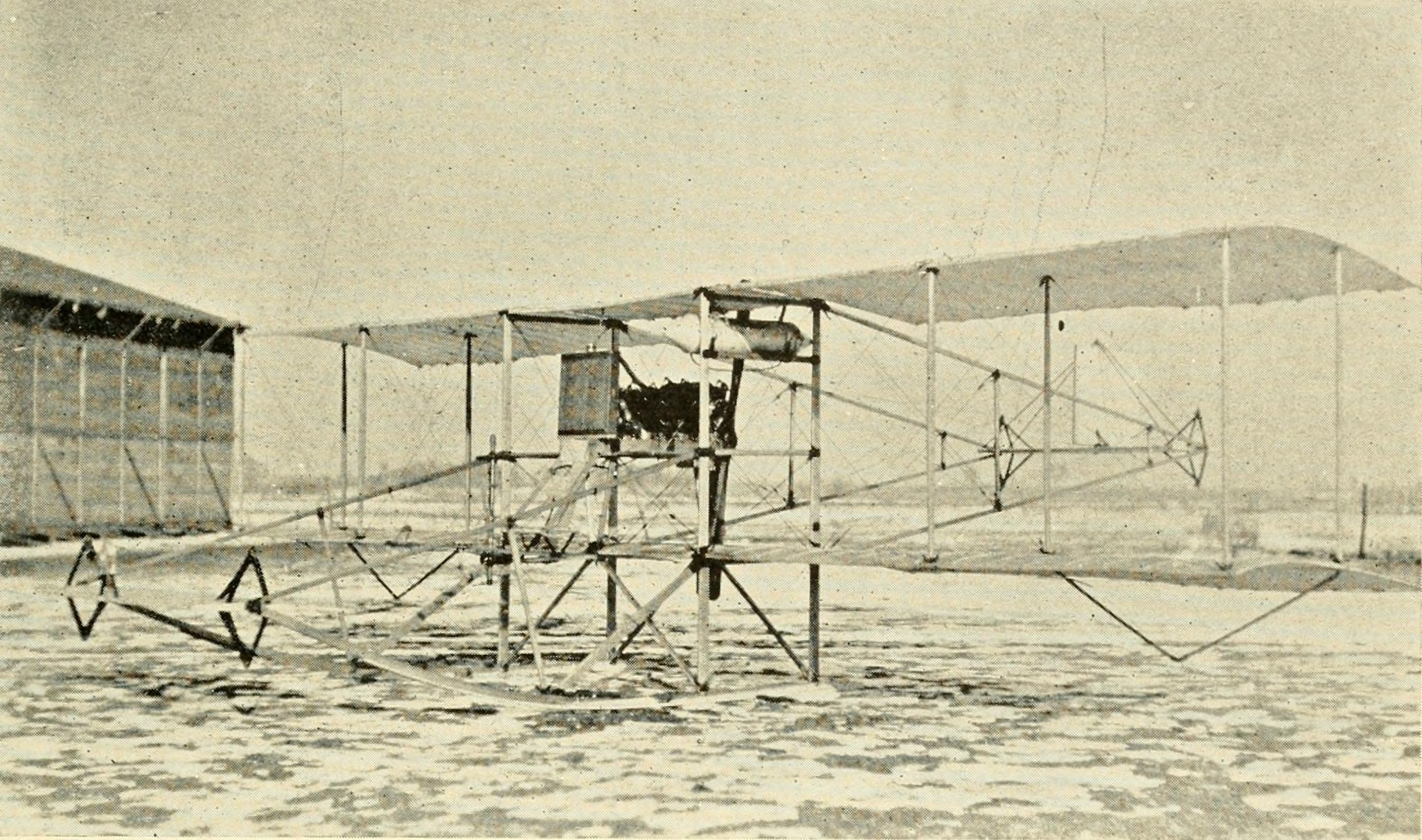
- Boland Conventional Biplane

General information
- Type: Pioneer era aircraft
- National origin: United States
- Manufacturer: Boland Airplane and Motor Company
- Designer: Frank Boland
- Number built: 1

History
- First flight: 1911
- Developed from: Boland 1911 Tailless Biplane

The Boland 1911 Conventional Biplane was an American pioneering aircraft.

During the winter of 1911-1912, Frank Boland built a conventional pusher biplane. Boland built this aircraft to compare it with the tailless aircraft that he'd been building for the 3 previous years.

== Design and development ==
Frank Boland wanted to make sure that he fully understood the dynamics of a conventional biplane so, in the winter of 1911-12, he constructed an aircraft of his own design in Mineola, Long Island. This conventional pusher biplane had an interconnected forward and rear elevator. A movable rudder is mounted in the rear. Roll control was achieved using wing warping. Boland used this aircraft to contrast with the performance of his unorthodox tailless 'jibbed' biplane that he had completed the previous October.

Boland flew this plane throughout the winter in the snowy fields of Mineola. The aircraft was designed for an axle and a pair of wheels, but they were never mounted. In the icy conditions, taking off and landing using just the skids was fine.

This was the only conventional biplane constructed by Boland. After flying this aircraft through the winter, he disassembled the aircraft in the spring and returned to the development of his tailless aircraft.

== Wing Warping ==
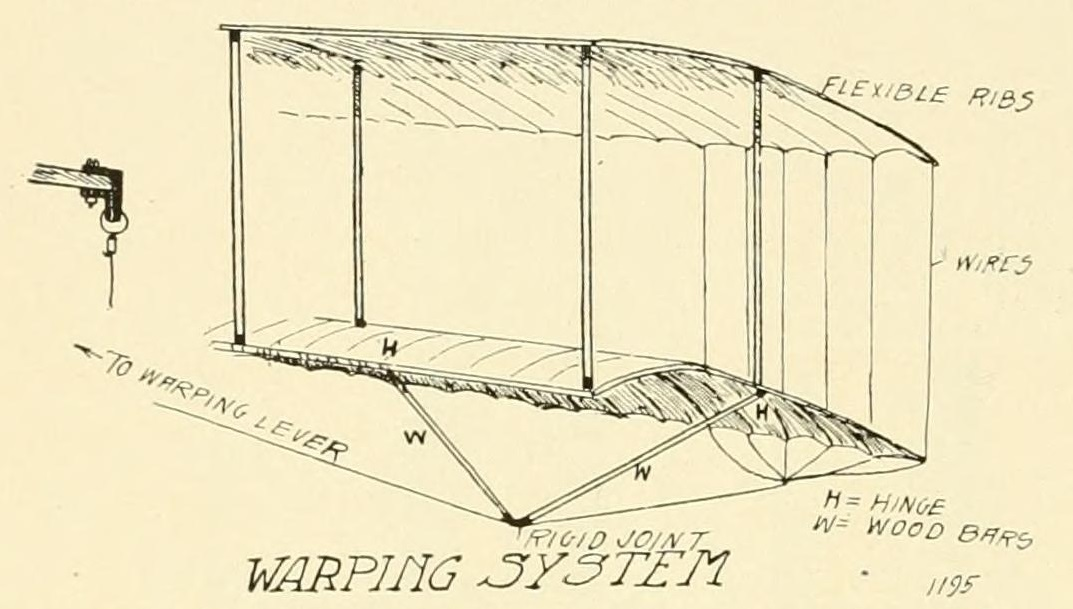
Wing warping detail drawing, Boland 1911 Conventional biplane

From Aeronautics magazine Feb 1912 issue describing the operation of the wing warping system illustrated to the right:

"The wings can be warped down by swinging the steering lever. As one side is warped down, the other side is free to bend up under the air pressure. The warping wires are normally taut and keep these ribs bent down to their regular curve. The curve is 21/3 inches deep, at 16 inches back. The front and rear beams are exactly the same height from the ground, the ribs going under the rear beam."

== Specifications ==
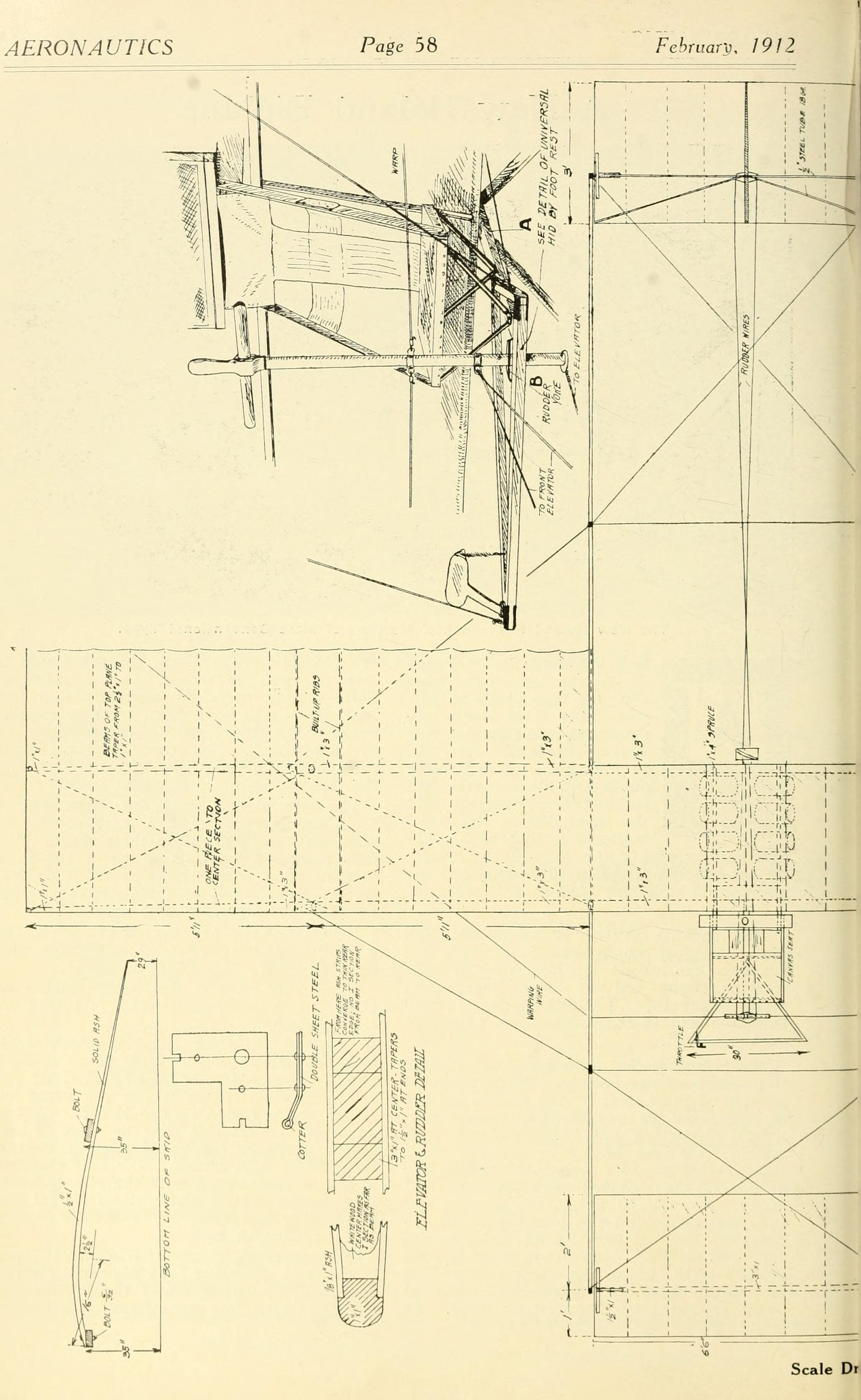
Boland 1911 Conventional biplane 3 view drawing page 1

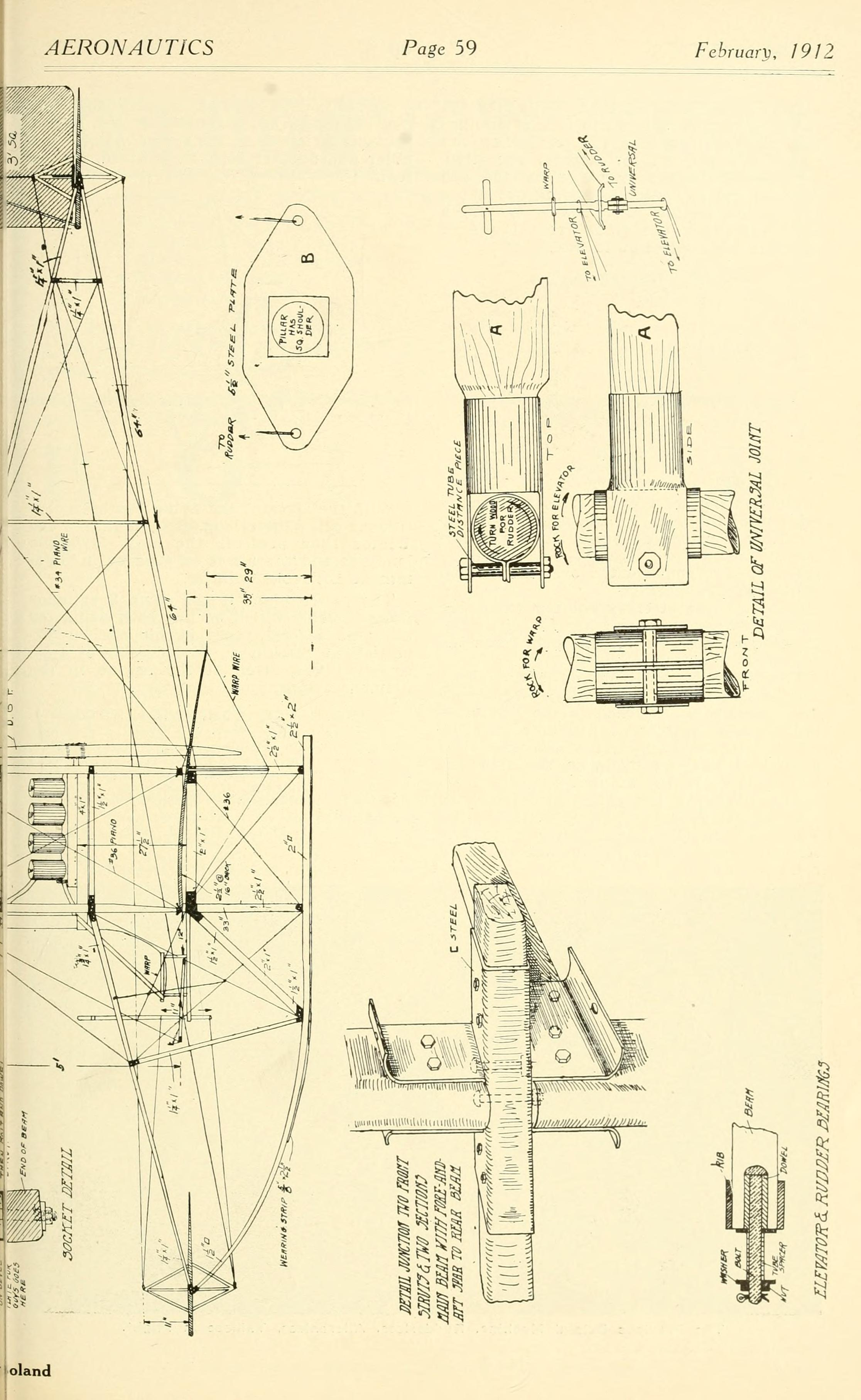
Boland 1911 Conventional biplane 3 view drawing page 2

General characteristics

- Crew: 1
- Wingspan: 30 ft 4 in (9.25 m)
- Gross weight: 750 lb (340 kg)
- Fuel capacity: 10 US gal (38 L; 8.3 imp gal)
- Powerplant: 1 × Boland 60hp V-8 water-cooled piston engine, 60 hp (45 kW)
- Propellers: 2-bladed

Performance

- Maximum speed: 60 mph (97 km/h, 52 kn)
