= Greene 1910 Biplane =

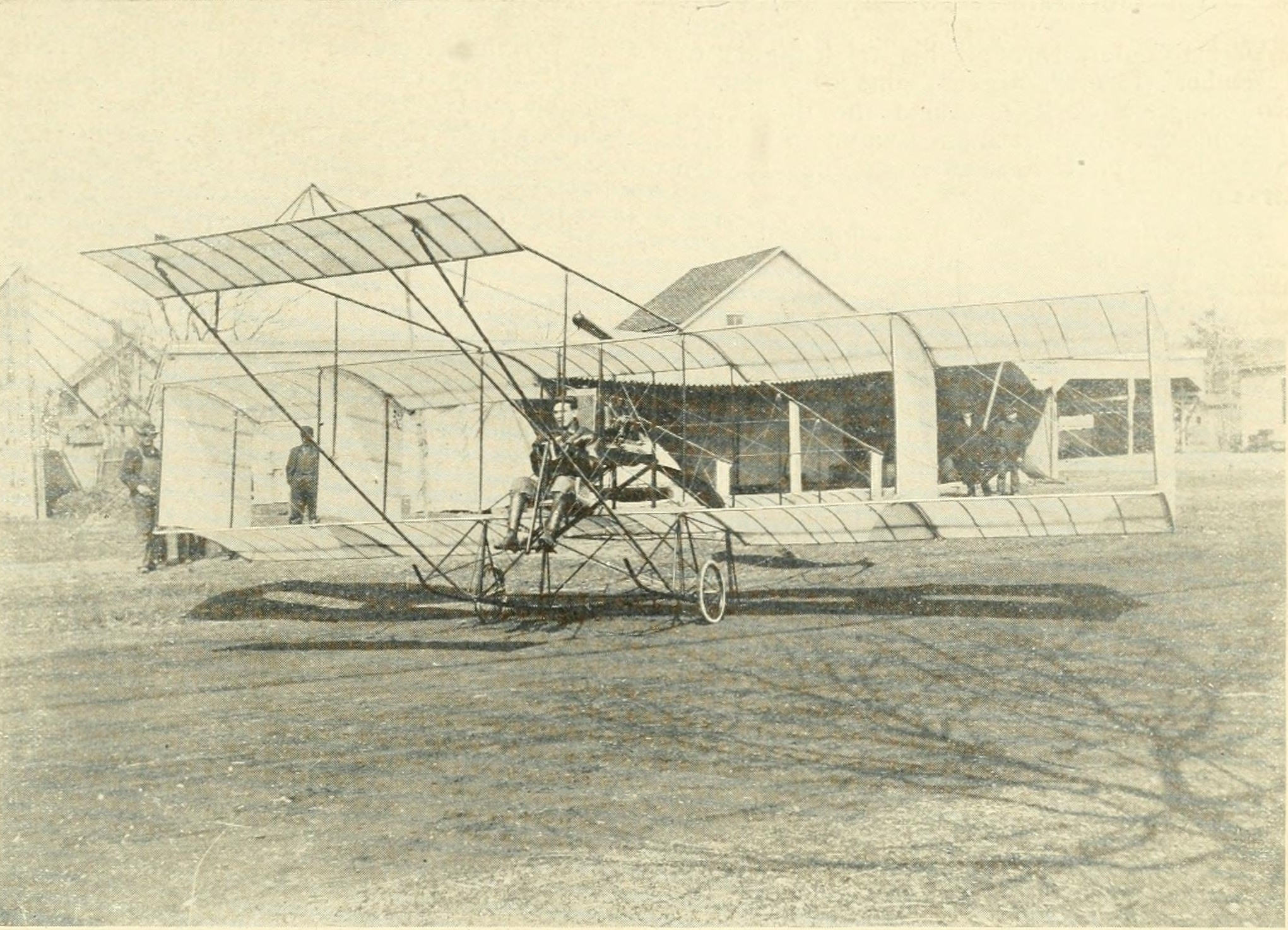
- Greene 1910 Biplane

General information
- Type: Pioneer era aircraft
- National origin: United States
- Designer: Dr. William Greene
- Number built: 4

History
- Developed from: Greene 1909 Biplane

In early 1910, Dr. William Greene designed, built and sold the successor to his own 1909 biplane in Mineola, Long Island at the Aeronautic Society's facility. This aircraft was a fairly conventional biplane in the Farman style. By mid April 1910, Greene had left New York City and moved to Rochester, NY to start a company to produce aircraft of his own design.

== Design and development ==
Greene built the first of his 1910 biplanes for Roy W. Crosby of San Francisco, CA. This aircraft was originally equipped with a Curtiss motor but on later models, he used the Elbridge 2-stroke Featherweight motor instead. The aircraft was designed to provide lateral control in a way that avoided the Wright brothers patent. It was equipped with a single forward elevator and a horizontal stabilizer with a movable rudder in the rear. The elevator was wired to work in conjunction with a flap that was attached to the trailing edge of the horizontal stabilizer. Ailerons were attached to the rear wing struts and were actuated by a Curtiss style shoulder control. Later models had wingspans of 30 ft (9.14 m) and 37 ft (11.28 m)

== Specifications (Greene 1910 Biplane - Crosby) ==
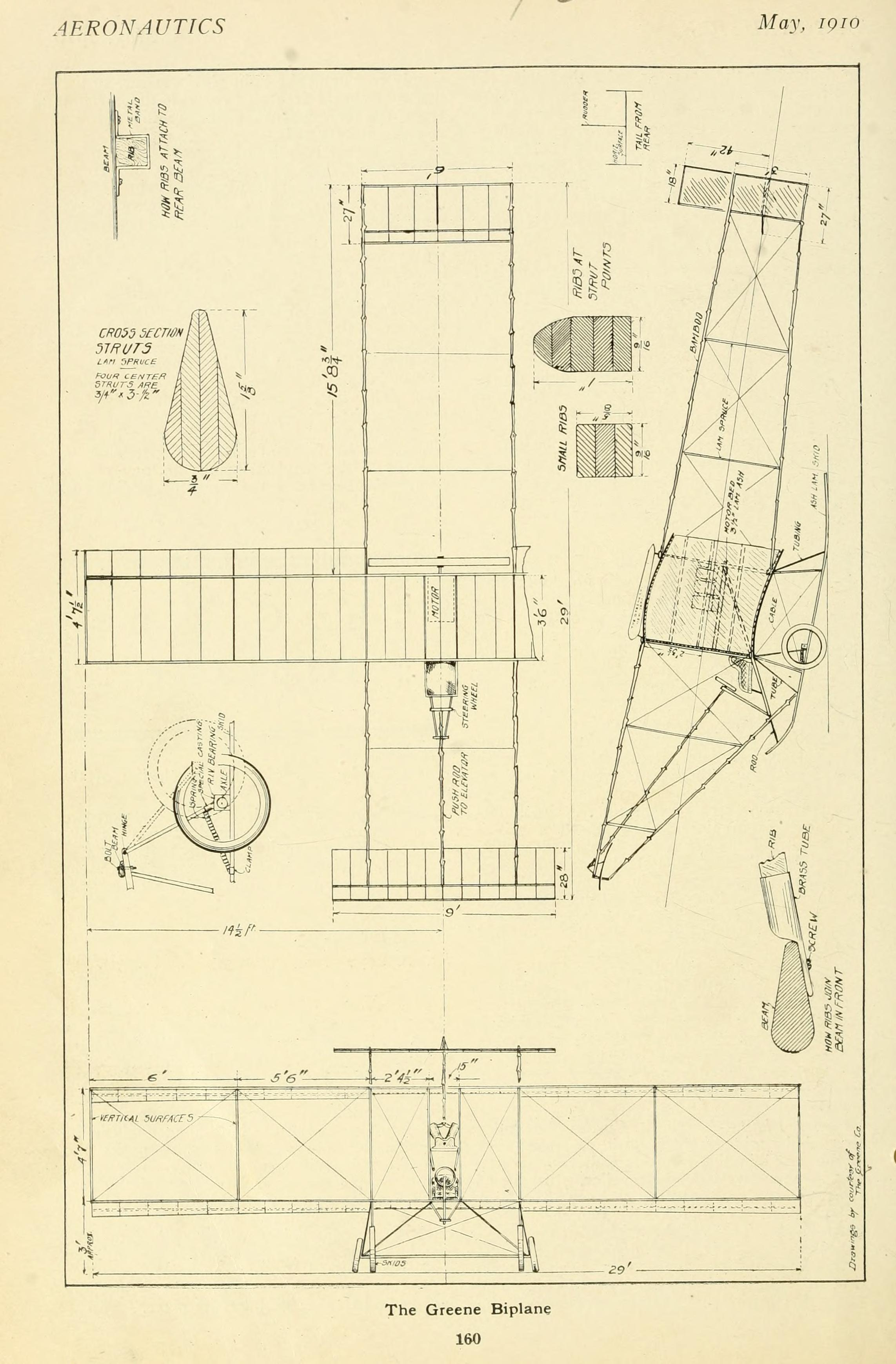
3 view drawing of the 1910 Greene biplane. From Aeronautics magazine, May,1910

General characteristics

- Crew: 1
- Length: 29 ft (8.8 m)
- Wingspan: 29 ft (8.8 m)
- Powerplant: 1 × Curtiss B-8 V-8 air-cooled piston engine, 40 hp (30 kW)

Performance
