= Boland 1914 Monoplane Flying Boat =

1914 Monoplane Flying Boat
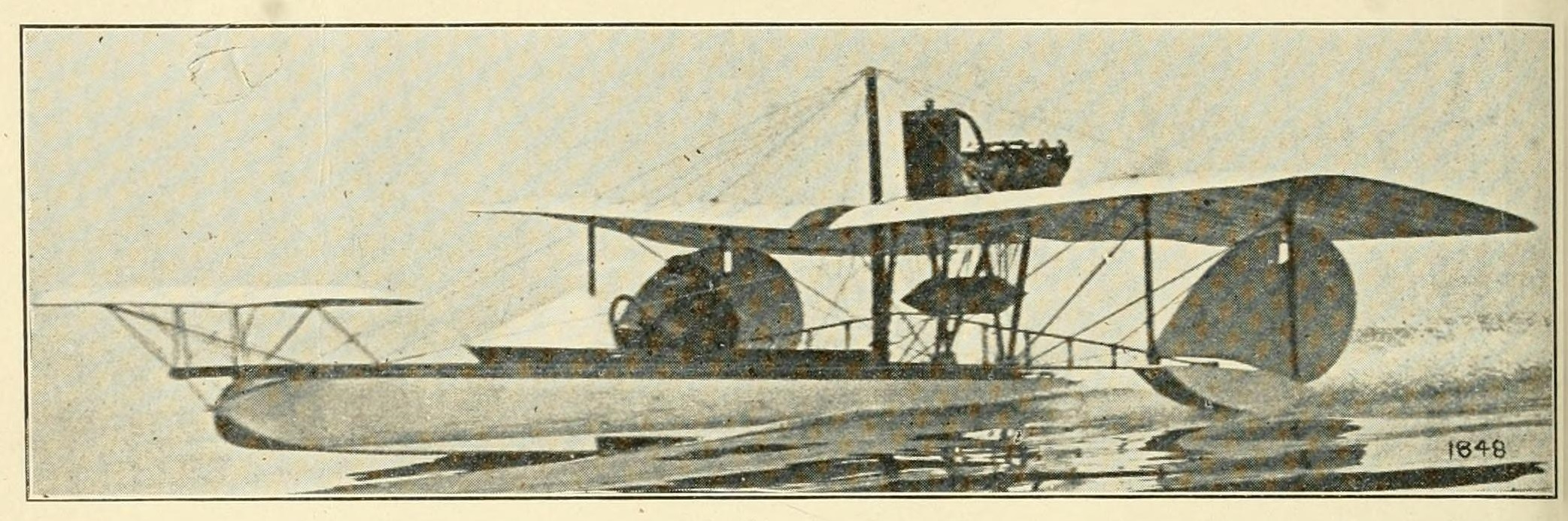
- Boland 1914 Monoplane Flying Boat

General information
- Type: Flying Boat
- National origin: United States
- Manufacturer: Boland Aeroplane and Motor Company
- Designer: Joseph Boland

History
- First flight: 1914

The Boland 1914 Monoplane Flying Boat was a tailless, pusher flying boat built by the Boland Aeroplane and Motor Company.

== Design and development ==
This aircraft was the only monoplane development from the Boland brothers that used their unusual 'jib' method of lateral control.

The pilot and passenger were arranged in tandem, with the pilot in the forward position and the passenger seated to the rear, directly over the center of gravity of the aircraft. A small cockpit fairing was located in front of the pilot. The hull was a narrow two step, flat bottom design that was slightly concave in the rear most section. The hull was almost rectangular in section. It was constructed of mahogany ribs with a single ply spruce skin covered in doped and varnished linen. A small, rectangular rudder was mounted under the rear of the hull to provide steerage in the water.

The wings were mounted 3 ft (0.91 m) above the hull. A lightweight cantilever structure extended from the hull to provide the lower support for the wing jib. A pontoon was mounted on the lower extremity of the cantilever to provide flotation for the wing tips. A vertical mast was attached to the keel that extended above the wings. From the top of the mast, guy wires were run to the forward hull, the engine mount and the wings.

The forward mounted elevator was attached to an extension of the hull gunwale. The engine was also mounted on the gunwale at the rear of the hull.

In production, the Boland 100hp V-8 with a 7 ft (2.1 m) 4-bladed prop was to be installed, but it is unclear if this was ever done. When Aeromarine bought out the Boland brothers, the aircraft was referred to as the Aeromarine Flying Boat.

== Specifications ==
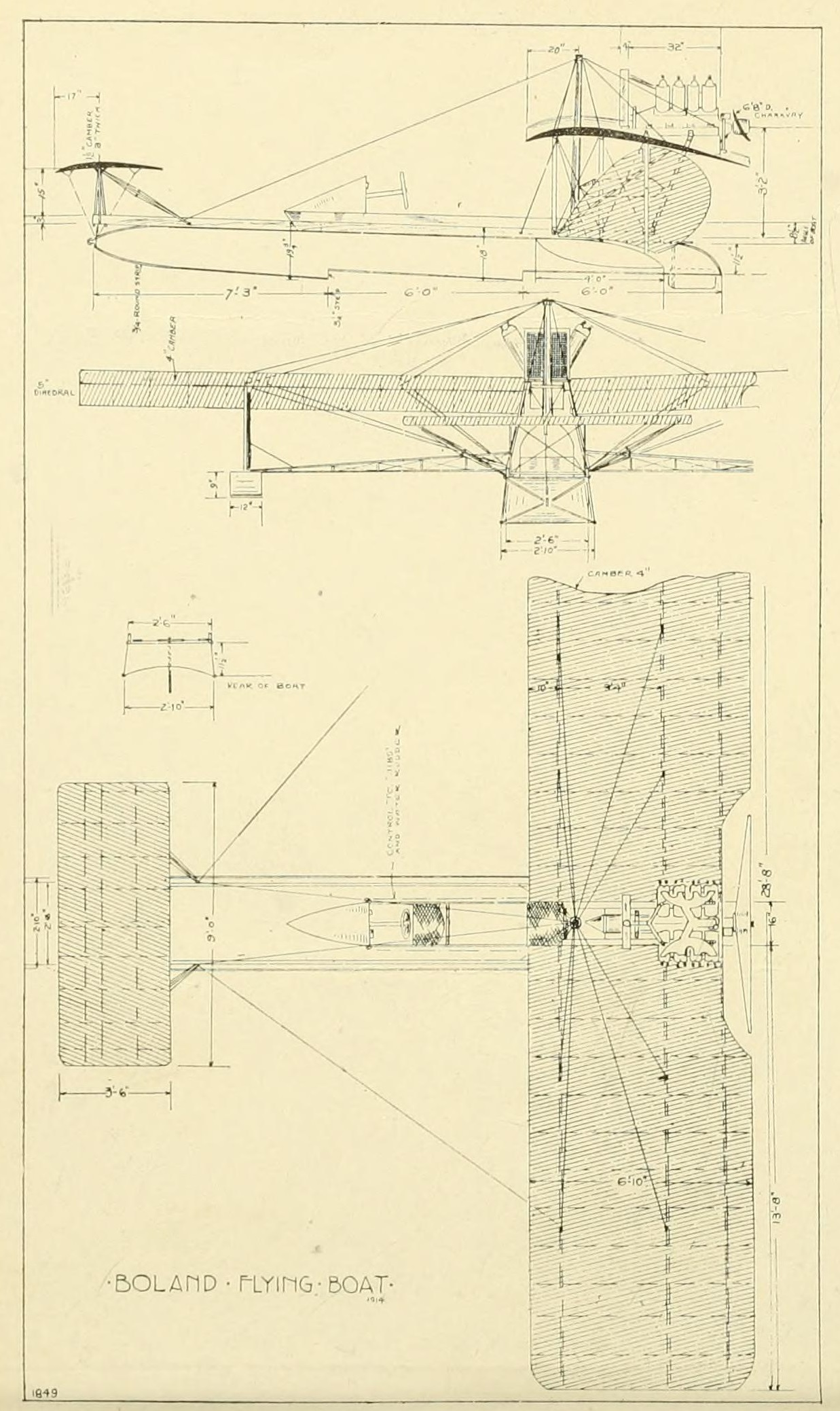
Boland 1914 Monoplane Flying Boat 3 view Aeronautics vol.13-14 p.270

General characteristics

- Length: 20 ft 8 in (6.30 m)
- Wingspan: 28 ft 8 in (8.74 m)
- Empty weight: 900 lb (408 kg)
- Powerplant: 1 × Boland 70hp V-8 piston engine
- Propellers: 2-bladed, 6 ft 8 in (2.03 m) diameter

Performance
