= Aeromarine K-6 =

1915 American aircraft engine

K-6
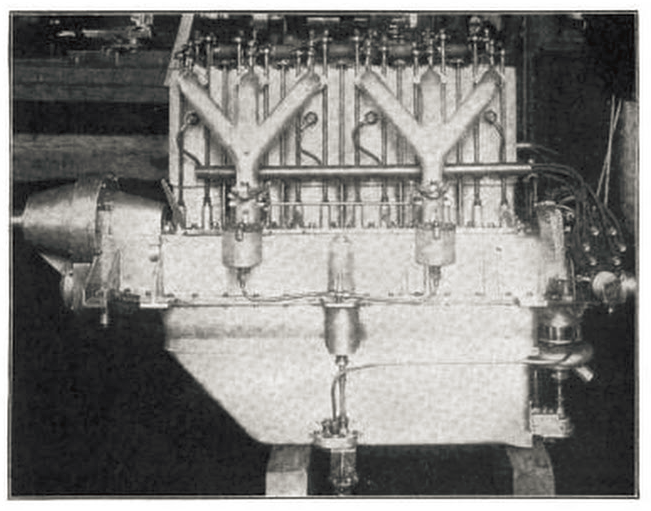
- Aeromarine K-6
- Type: Piston aero engine
- National origin: United States
- Manufacturer: Aeromarine
- First run: 1915
- Developed from: Aeromarine 90hp

The Aeromarine K-6 is an aircraft engine built by the Aeromarine Plane and Motor Company in 1915. It is an Aeromarine 90hp with a .571 reduction gear. The addition of the reduction gear allowed the engine to produce more power by operating at a higher RPM. This engine made its peak power of 100 hp at 2000 rpm

== Specifications ==
Data from Airplane Engine Encyclopedia

=== General characteristics ===
- Type: 6 cylinder vertical inline piston engine
- Bore: 4.3125 in (109.54 mm)
- Stroke: 5.125 in (130.18 mm)
- Displacement: 449.16 cu in (7.36 L)
- Dry weight: 435 lb (197 kg)

=== Components ===
- Valvetrain: Concentric overhead valve
- Fuel system: 2 Zenith carburetors
- Fuel type: gasoline
- Cooling system: Water
- Reduction gear: .571:1

=== Performance ===
- Power output: 100 hp (75 kW) nominal at 2,000 rpm
- Specific fuel consumption: 0.63 lb/(hp⋅h) (0.38 kg/kWh)
- Oil consumption: 0.063 lb/(hp⋅h) (0.038 kg/kWh)
- Power-to-weight ratio: 0.23 hp/lb (0.38 kW/kg)
