= Boland V-8 =

Aircraft Engine

V-8
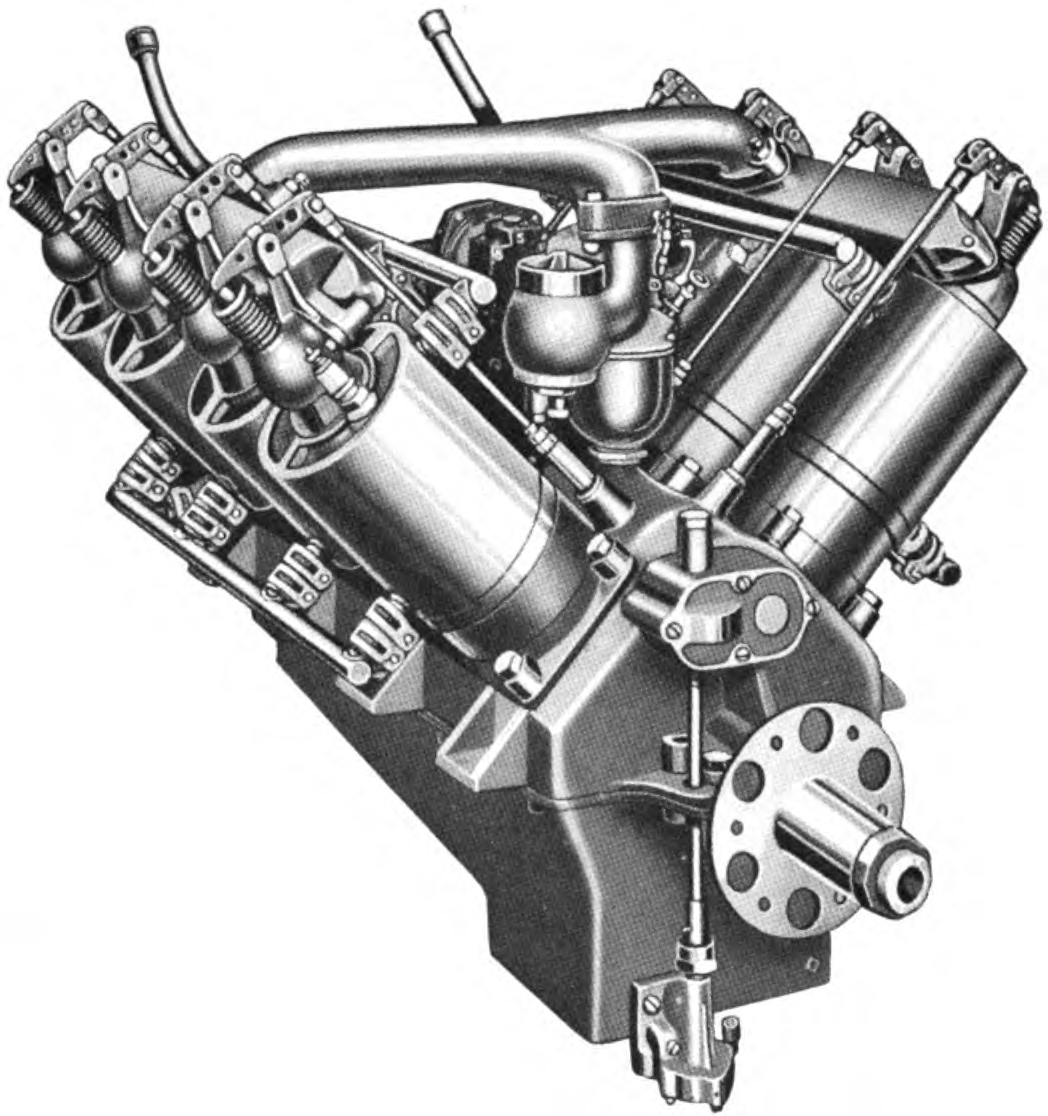
- Boland 60 hp V-8
- Type: Piston aero engine
- National origin: United States
- Manufacturer: Boland Airplane and Motor Company

The Boland V-8 was an aircraft engine that was developed by the Boland Brothers for use in their tailless aircraft. Between 1908 and 1914, four versions of this motor were produced ranging in power from 60 hp (45 kW) to 125 hp (93 kW). The Boland motors all used an unusual concentric overhead valve. This arrangement positioned the intake valve in the middle of the exhaust valve. These were actuated by a single push rod and rocker arm.

== Variants ==
60 HP
The prototype of this motor first appeared in a Boland aircraft 1908. According to a Boland advertisement from 1911, they claimed that this single original motor powered all of the various iterations of the early Boland aircraft for three years without the need for repair or rebuild
70 HP
Bore: 4 in (101.60 mm), Stroke: 4.5 in (114.30 mm), Displacement: 452.04 cu in (7.41 L), Weight: 255 lb (116 kg)
100 HP
Bore: 4.5 in (114.30 mm), Stroke: 5.5 in (139.70 mm), Displacement: 699.76 cu in (11.47 L), Weight: 325 lb (147 kg)
125 HP
This motor was mentioned in a 1914 Boland advertisement.

== Applications ==
- Boland 1911 Tailless Biplane (60 HP)
- Shieder 1911 aeroplane (60 HP)
- Boland 1911 Conventional Biplane (60 HP)
- Boland 1912 Tailless Biplane (60 HP)
- Spainour 1913 monoplane (60 HP)
- Boland 1914 Monoplane Flying Boat (70 HP)

== Specifications (60 HP) ==
Data from Airplane Engine Encyclopedia.

=== General characteristics ===
- Type: 8-cylinder Vee piston engine
- Bore: 4 in (101.60 mm)
- Stroke: 4 in (101.60 mm)
- Displacement: 402.08 cu in (6.59 L)
- Dry weight: 240 lb (110 kg)

=== Components ===
- Valvetrain: Concentric overhead valve
- Fuel system: 1 Schebler carburetor
- Fuel type: Gasoline
- Cooling system: Water
- Ignition: Bosch or Mea high tension magnetos

=== Performance ===
- Power output: 60 hp (45 kW) at 1,400rpm

== See also ==
Related lists

- List of aircraft engines
