= Boland 1911 Tailless Biplane =

1911 Tailless Biplane
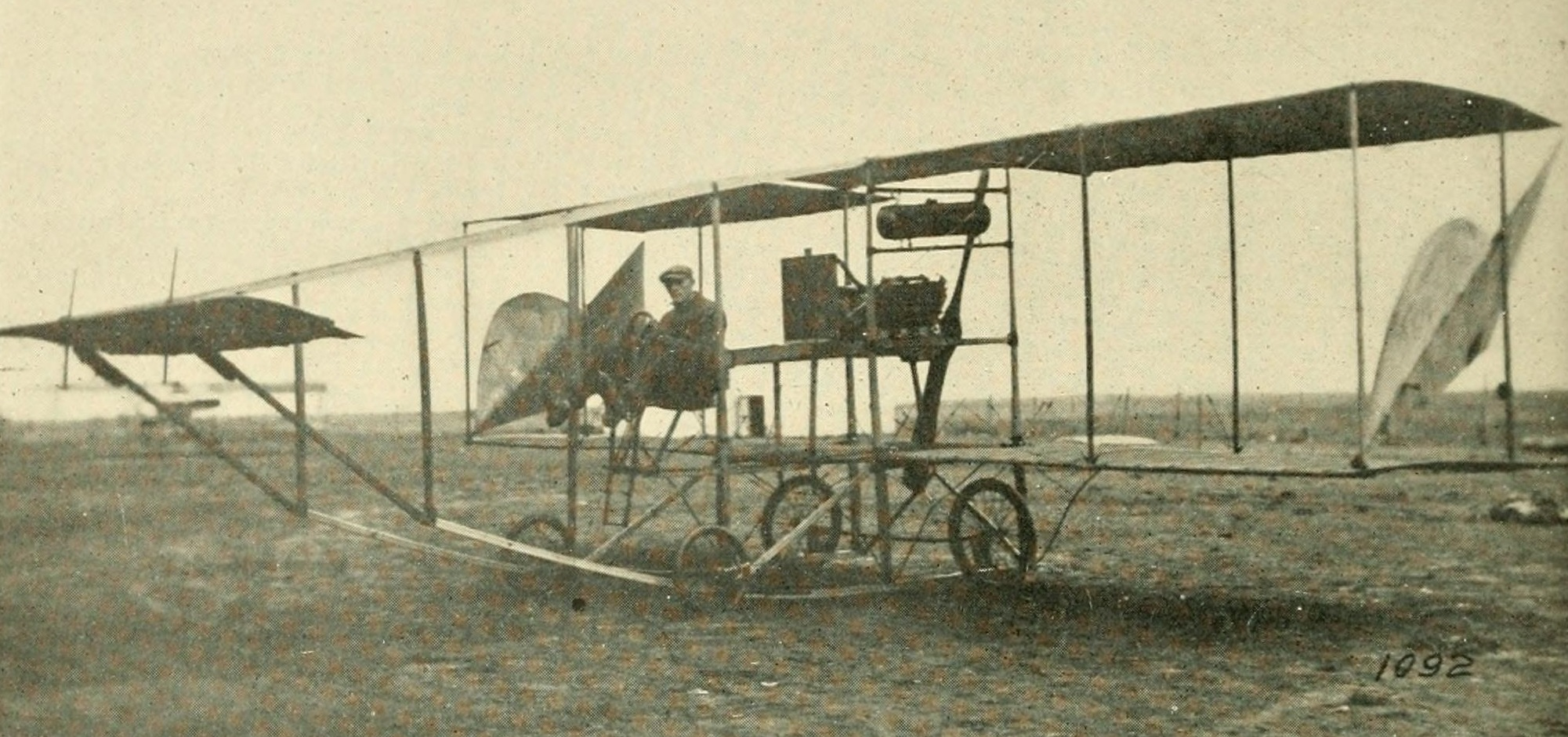
- Boland Tailless Biplane

General information
- Type: Pioneer era aircraft
- National origin: United States
- Manufacturer: Boland Airplane and Motor Company
- Designer: Frank Boland
- Number built: 1

History
- First flight: 1911
- Developed from: Greene 1909 Biplane

The Boland 1911 Tailless Biplane was an American pioneering aircraft.

At the end of 1909, Wilbur R. Kimball bought Dr. William Greene's 1909 biplane and took it to Rahway, New Jersey where he and Frank Boland removed the tail and began experimenting with a novel control system that eventually led to the first Boland Brothers 'jibbed' tailless biplane.

== Design and development ==
Frank Boland was convinced that a traditional tail rudder and ailerons/wing warping was unnecessary to provide lateral control for an airplane. He started experimenting with different control mechanisms in 1908. More enthusiastic and daring than skilled engineer, Boland and Kimball spent 1910 experimenting with, crashing and rebuilding the Greene biplane while they worked out and refined what Boland called the 'jibbed' control.

The resulting airplane was very easy to fly. To go left or right, you would turn the wheel in the direction you wished to go and up and down was controlled by pushing and pulling on the control wheel. From a description of his flight in Mineola, Long Island in 1911: "There is no grandstand play about Boland's flying. He just gets in the machine and off he goes turning as he leaves the ground, if he likes, which no other aviator thinks of doing. He just imagines himself in an automobile and drives accordingly. He says he never bothers about lateral balance or other minor things like that."

Boland was very much into the adventure of discovery and flying. Appearance was of little concern to him. A quote from the same article describes the condition of his aircraft: "No attempt has been made to refine the machine, to have nicely finished woodwork, or neat sockets and turnbuckles.The cloth is rusty from the weather and has been on for about a year, part of the time no shed being provided for the machine at all—he just leaves it out like a lazy farmer would his plow. Some ribs have one curve, some another, sometimes they are flat, due to weather conditions. Out under the elevator hang four sash weights which some time in the past aided the housewife to raise her kitchen window. All Boland wants to do is fly and he doesn't care a hang for looks."

== Wing Jib Control ==
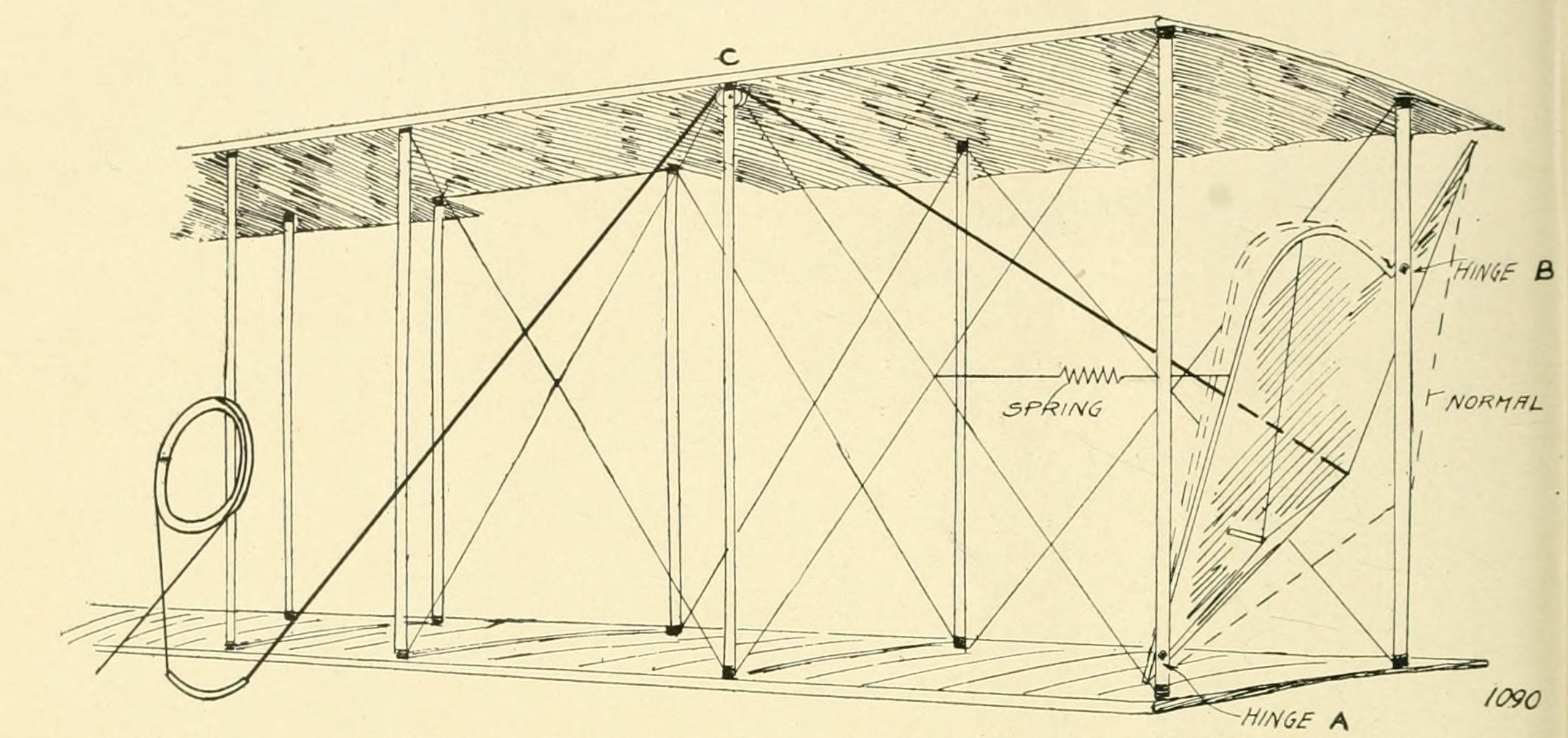
Drawing of the Boland 'jib' from Aeronautics magazine

From Aeronautics magazine Nov. 1911 issue describing the operation of the wing jib control illustrated on the right:

"According to Mr. Boland, the operation of the machine is the same as that of an automobile, with the exception of the elevator which works in the accepted manner. In order to turn to the left the wheel is turned to the left, the machine swinging around easily and banking itself properly. When the turn is complete the wheel is brought back to center and "that's all there is to it". The jibs are triangular in shape with a balancing portion, and are pivoted at the points A and B as shown in this sketch, the wire C from the wheel going to the lower corner. When the wheel is turned, the lower corner of the jib is pulled in, thus presenting an obliquely inclined surface, offering resistance on that side."

== Specifications ==
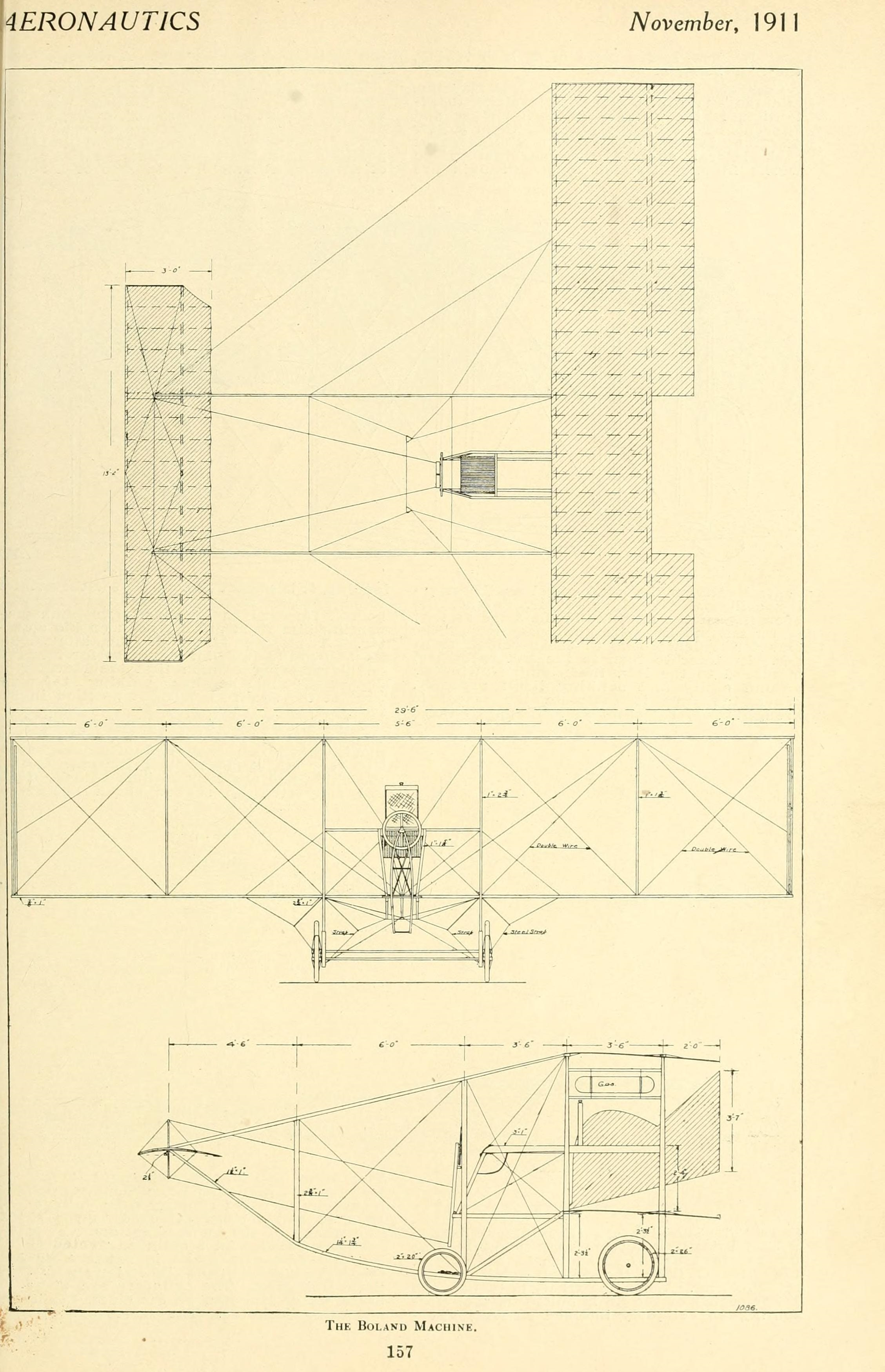
3 view drawing of the Boland biplane from Nov. 1911 Aeronautics magazine

General characteristics

- Crew: 1
- Length: 20 ft 6 in (6.25 m)
- Wingspan: 29 ft 6 in (8.99 m)
- Empty weight: 800 lb (363 kg)
- Powerplant: 1 × Boland 60hp V-8 water-cooled piston engine, 60 hp (45 kW)
- Propellers: 2-bladed

Performance

- Maximum speed: 50 mph (80 km/h, 43 kn)
