= William Greene (aviator) =

American aviation pioneer

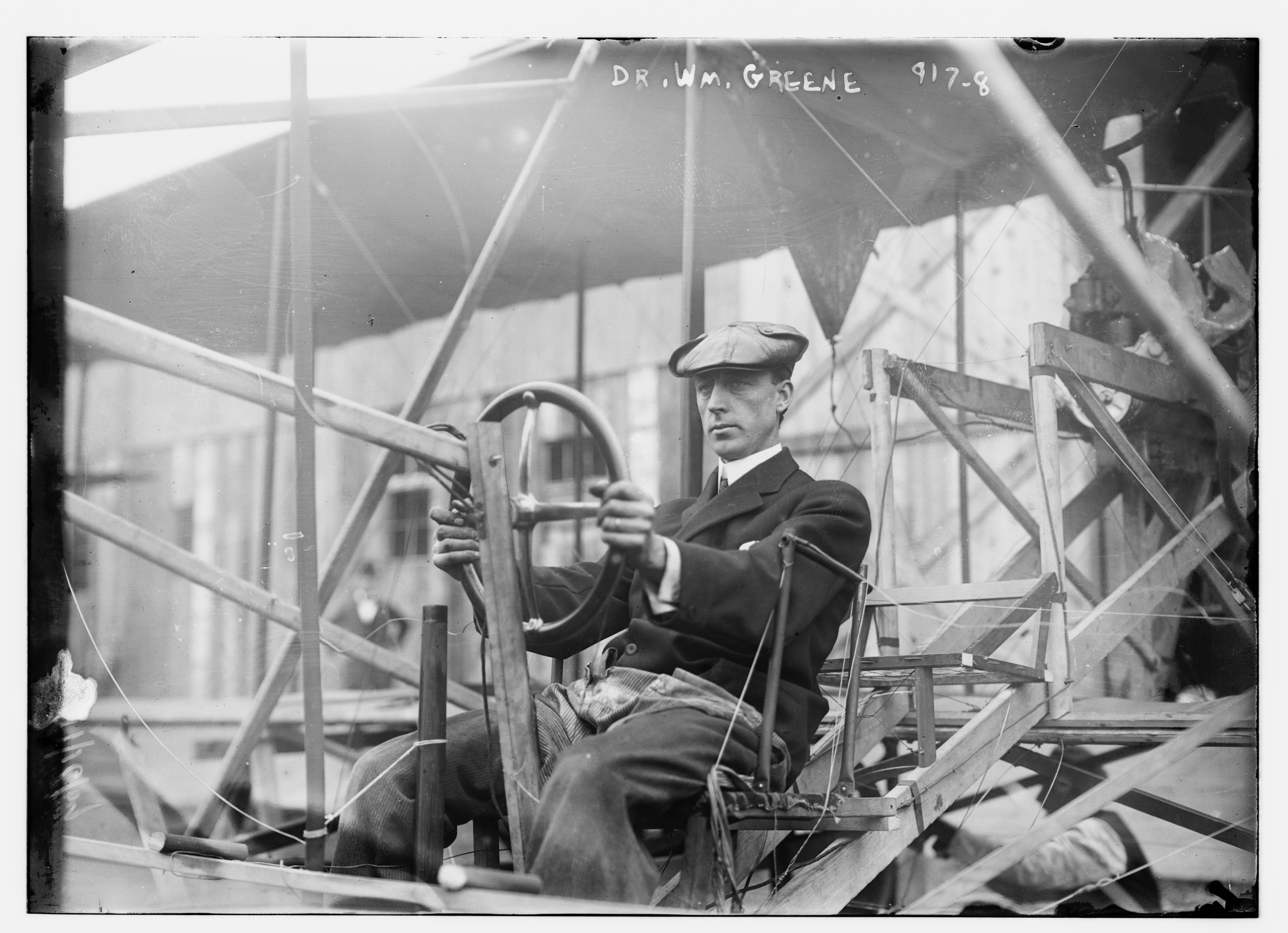
- Born: May 2, 1874; San Francisco, California
- Died: August 28, 1952 (aged 78); Edmonton, Alberta

William Greene (May 2, 1874 – August 28, 1952) was an early aviation pioneer who was one of the first American pilots and airplane constructor. He developed a passion for flying at an early age and was an active member and treasurer of the Aeronautical Society of New York. In 1909 he designed, constructed and piloted a biplane at the Morris Park Aerodrome, Bronx, NY. He later formed an aircraft manufacturing company in Rochester, NY

== Early life ==
Greene was born into a wealthy San Francisco family in 1872. His fascination with aviation began at twelve, when he performed his first experiment by jumping from the second storey of a building with an umbrella to slow his descent. After graduating from University with both a medical and dentistry degree, he traveled throughout Mexico and Central America to pursue his dream of flight. In 1902, he built and successfully flew a balloon in Chiapas, Mexico. Upon hearing of the Wright brothers' success, left Mexico for New York to further his exploration of aviation.

== Aviation career ==
In New York, Greene joined the Aeronautical Society of New York and, by 1909, he was their treasurer. Greene constructed his first aircraft in 1907, in which he made a series of short hops. In 1908 the Aeronautical Society began a two-year rental agreement with the closed Morris Park Racetrack and invited the top aviators in the nation to come and experiment with aircraft. Greene set up shop at Morris Park and began work on his first truly successful airplane, which flew for the first time in 1909. Building on the success of this aircraft, in 1910 Greene established a small aircraft factory in Rochester, NY where he constructed and sold 4 more aircraft. While Greene was working on an aircraft to compete for the $10,000 prize offered by publisher Joseph Pulitzer for the first airplane to fly from Albany, NY to New York City, he learned that Glenn Curtiss was ready to attempt the flight and in a show of good sportsmanship, he traveled to Albany to be present and to hold the wing of Curtiss's aircraft for the takeoff. Due to financial difficulties, Greene closed his factory in 1911 and ended his aviation experiments.

In 1910, along with four other members of the Aeronautical Society of New York, set the New England ballooning record of 175 miles in 5 hours and 59 minutes.

== Aircraft ==
- Greene 1909 Biplane
- Greene 1910 Biplane

== Later life ==
In 1911, he made his way north into Canada where he eventually settled in Hudson's Hope, BC with his wife Mary Evangeline Hilliard of Waterloo, Ontario. Hudson's Hope is where they had their only daughter, Ursula. Upon hearing of the United States' entry into World War I, Greene returned to America and joined the Army. Returning to Peace River, Alberta after the war, he opened a dental practice. He became an active member of the community. Fond of the theater and performance arts, he organized and directed several musicals in Peace River. He also had a horse-drawn wagon that he would take around the region and perform magic shows with his daughter as the assistant.

An avid outdoorsman, he and fellow Peace River resident, Norman Soars, persuaded the government to create the Greene Valley Game Preserve

Greene died on August 28, 1952, in Edmonton, Alberta from a stroke.

The way his aviation career ended may have affected him because he rarely spoke of it in his later years. Residents of Peace River where surprised to learn of his prominent place in aviation.
