= Greene 1909 Biplane =

American pioneering aircraft

1909 Biplane
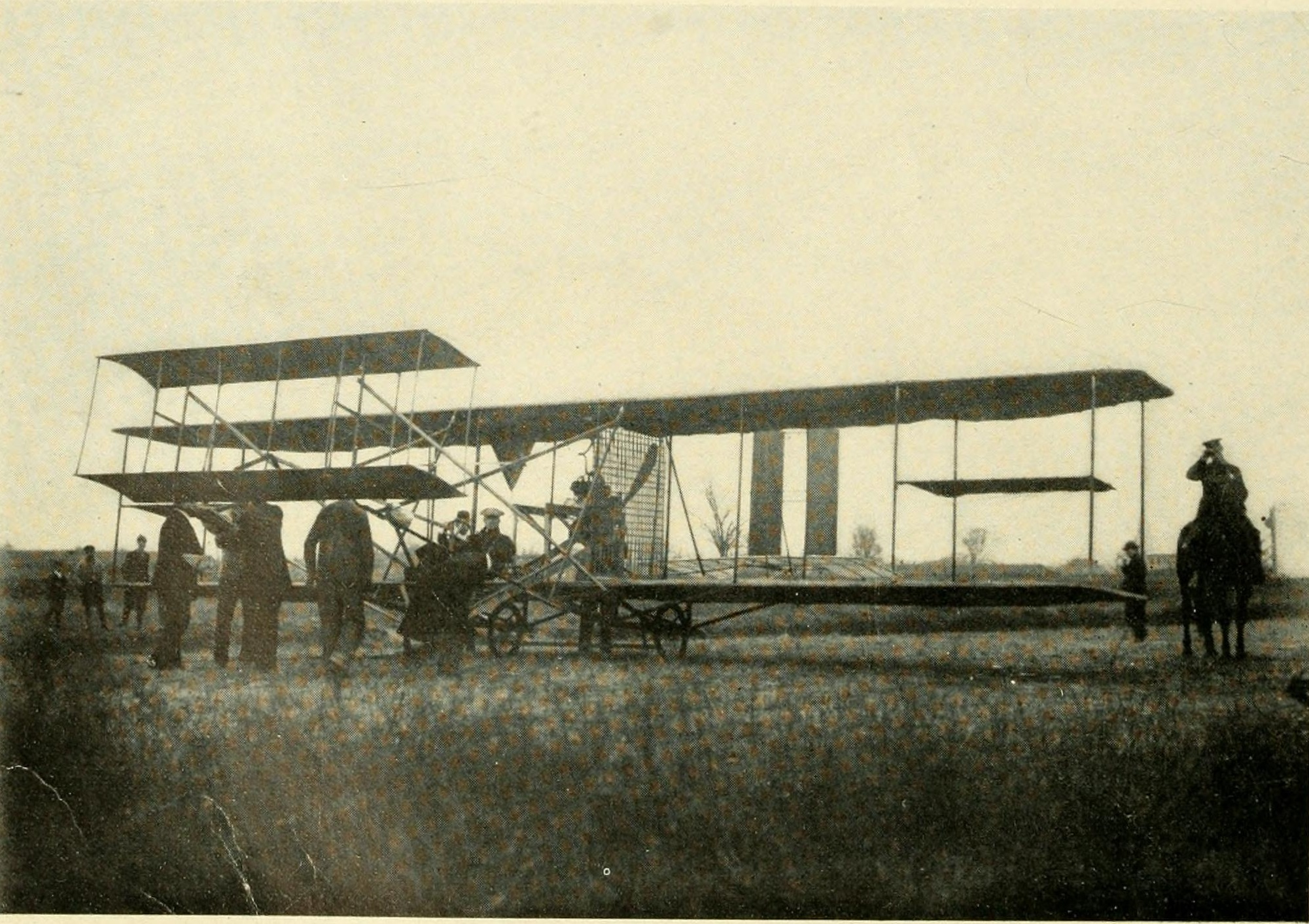
- Greene biplane at Morris Park, NY, November 1909

General information
- Type: Pioneer era aircraft
- Designer: Dr. William Greene
- Number built: 1

History
- First flight: October 28, 1909

The Greene 1909 Biplane was an American pioneering aircraft.

In 1909, at the Morris Park Raceway, Dr. William Greene constructed a biplane that successfully flew for the first time on October 28, 1909. The aircraft was in the Curtiss style with dual forward elevators and dual trailing rudders and a tricycle landing gear.

== Design and development ==
Greene constructed his first successful aircraft during the summer of 1909. Originally equipped with a 29 hp American & British automobile motor, he flew for the first time on October 28, 1909. During this flight he discovered that he had placed the engine, which weighed 320 lbs, too far to the rear and had to attach 80 lbs of sandbags to the front of the plane to balance it. His longest solo flight on this day was 600 ft

In November, Greene re-engined the aircraft with a lighter Kimball 2 cycle motor of 40 hp. On November 15 of the same year, he took up a passenger for the first time. After a series of exhibition flights at Morris Park, he sold the plane to Wilbur R. Kimball. He took it to Rahway, New Jersey where he and Frank Boland took the tail off of it and began experimenting with a novel control system that eventually led to the first Boland Brothers 'jibbed' tailless biplane.

During his flights at Morris Park in November, Dr. Greene set the world record for shortest take off at 30 ft.

== Specifications ==
General characteristics

- Wingspan: 44 ft (13 m)
- Powerplant: 1 × Kimball 2 cycle , 40 hp (30 kW)
