= First flight in Venezuela =

Aerial flight over Venezuela on 29 September 1912

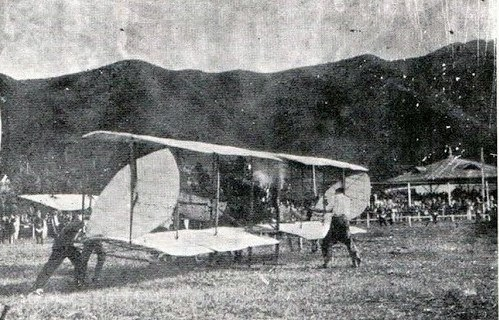
"1st aviation meeting in Caracas" Frank E. Boland tailless biplane.

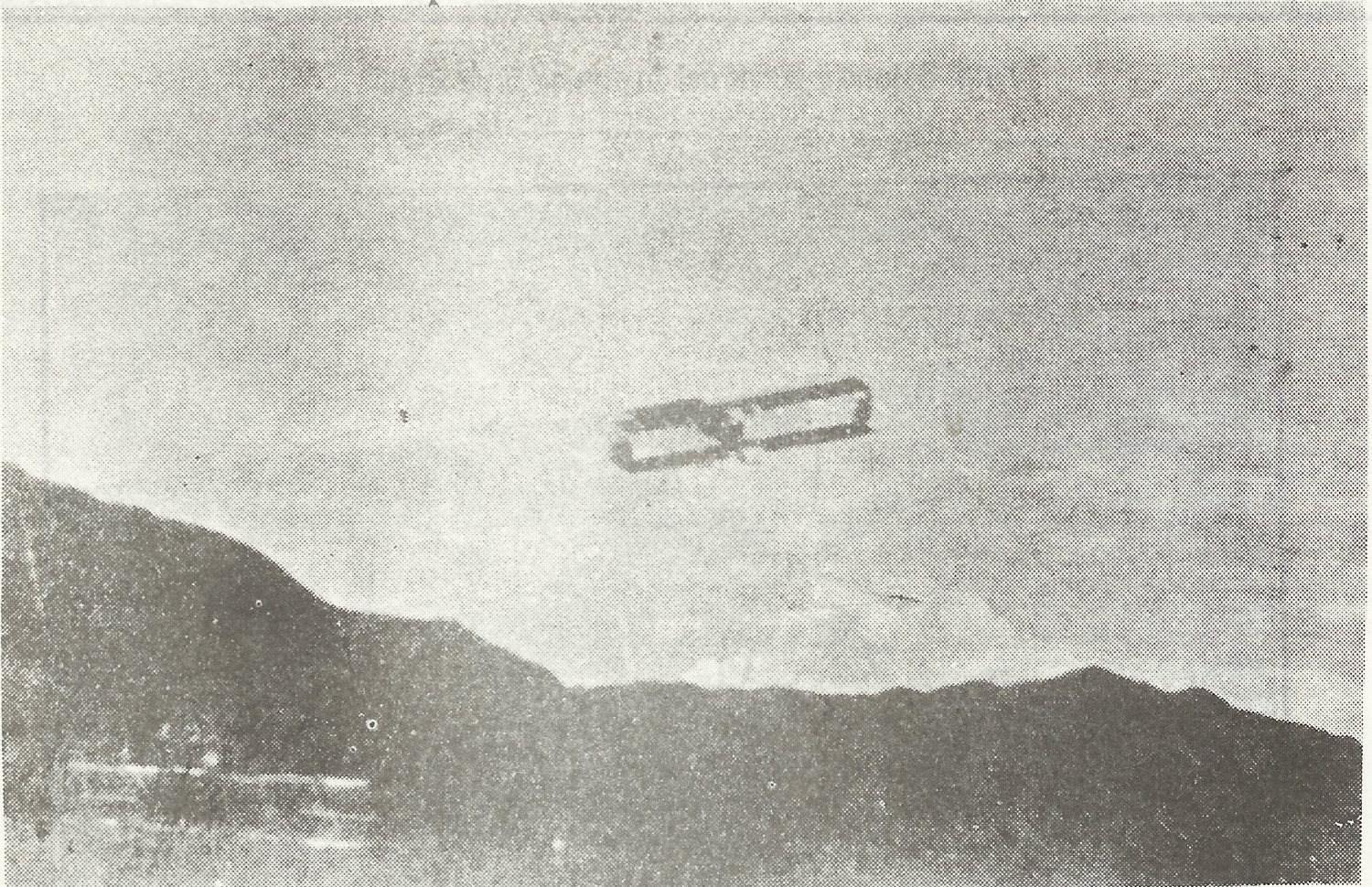
Aviator Frank Boland raises over Caracas, Oct 6, 1912. At the bottom left, Hoeflich's plane flipped over.

The first aerial flight over Venezuela was carried out in Caracas on 29 September 1912, by the American pilot Frank E. Boland and his assistant Charles Hoeflich, in a biplane designed by Boland, constructed of wood and fabric with a 60 hp (45 kW) engine and weighing 300 kg (660 lb).

== History ==
In 1912, General Roman Delgado Chalbaud invited American pilot Frank E. Boland, a member of the Boland Aeroplane Motor Co, to visit Venezuela. Boland, accompanied by Charles Hoeflich and equipment, arrived aboard the steamship SS Maracaibo.

On arrival at Caracas the aircraft were assembled and arrangements were made for the event to happen on 29 September in the grounds of the Hippodrome El Paraíso, where many city residents and the President of the Republic, the General Juan Vicente Gómez witnessed the event. The flight lasted about 27 minutes, flying across the city from West to East landing back at the Hippodrome El Paraíso.

At the second flight, performed on October 6, 1912, Hoeflich suffers the first aviation accident in the country, when on take off from the Hippodrome El Paraíso at Caracas, his aircraft flipped over causing serious damage to it and minor injuries to the pilot.

Boland also gave successful demonstrations at Valencia, Puerto Cabello, Barquisimeto, Maracaibo and Ciudad Bolívar.

== See also ==
- Venezuelan Air Force
