= Boland brothers =

Francis Edward Boland
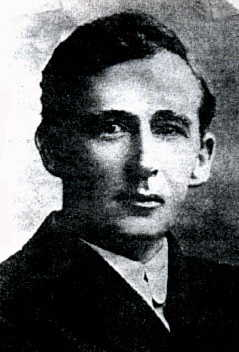
- Born: July 31, 1873; Craryville, New York
- Died: January 23, 1913 (aged 39); Trinidad and Tobago

Joseph John Boland
- Born: May 27, 1879; Rahway, New Jersey
- Died: September 12, 1964 (aged 85); Frederick, Maryland

James Paul Boland
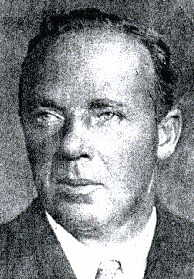
- Born: August 20, 1882; Rahway, New Jersey
- Died: December 19, 1967 (aged 85); Linden, New Jersey

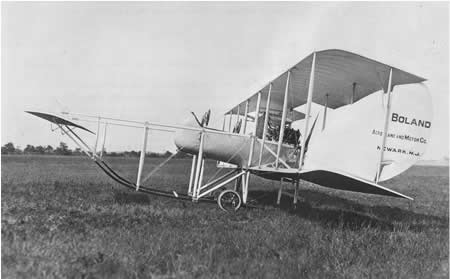
1910 Boland 1e-v at the Mineola Fairgrounds in 1914

Frank Edward Boland (July 31, 1873 – January 3, 1913), James Paul Boland (August 20, 1882 – December 19, 1967) and Joseph John Boland (May 27, 1879 – September 12, 1964) were early aircraft designers from Rahway, New Jersey who started the Boland Airplane and Motor Company.

== Biographies ==
They were the children of James Francis Boland (1834–1913) and Catherine Julia Kavanaugh (1843–1925).

They had set records for bicycle racing in 1898. In 1904, Frank and Joseph started a business servicing bicycles, motorcycles, and automobiles in Rahway.

The Boland brothers worked with tailless aircraft that were early predecessors of flying wings. They constructed the Boland 1911 Tailless Biplane and its successor a year later. A scale model of their plane is in the Smithsonian.

In 1912, Frank Boland became the first person to fly an aircraft in Venezuela. He was killed on January 23, 1913, during an exhibition flight in Trinidad.

In 1914, the Aeromarine Plane and Motor Company of Avondale, New Jersey, took over the manufacturing rights of all Boland airplanes and engines.

== Legacy ==
E.T. Wooldridge writes: "The Boland brothers were a relatively small, but extraordinary, part of early aviation history in the United States. Frank supplied the enthusiasm, ingenuity, and self-taught flying ability; Joseph provided the mechanical genius to transform ideas into some tangible, workable form; and James had the business sense so often lacking in ventures of that sort."

During the 1997-1998 and 1998-1999 contest years, the Boland Brothers team, composed of a great-grand-nephew and great-great-grandnephew of the Boland brothers, competed in the National Association of Rocketry at the regional and national levels, setting no fewer than two US model rocket performance records, and finishing in third place overall for the 1998-1999 season.

== In popular culture ==
Frank Boland's ill-fated flight in Port-of-Spain is referenced in Bruce Geddes' historical novel, Chasing the Black Eagle.

== Aircraft ==
- Boland 1911 Tailless Biplane
- Boland 1911 Conventional Biplane
- Boland 1912 Tailless Biplane
- Boland 1913 Tailless Flying Boat
- Boland 1914 Monoplane Flying Boat
- Boland 1914 Biplane Flying Boat
- Boland 1914 Military Scout

== Engines ==
- Boland V-8

== See also ==
- Wright brothers
- Wittemann brothers
- Voisin brothers
